= List of butterflies of North America (Nymphalidae) =

== Subfamily Libytheinae: snouts ==
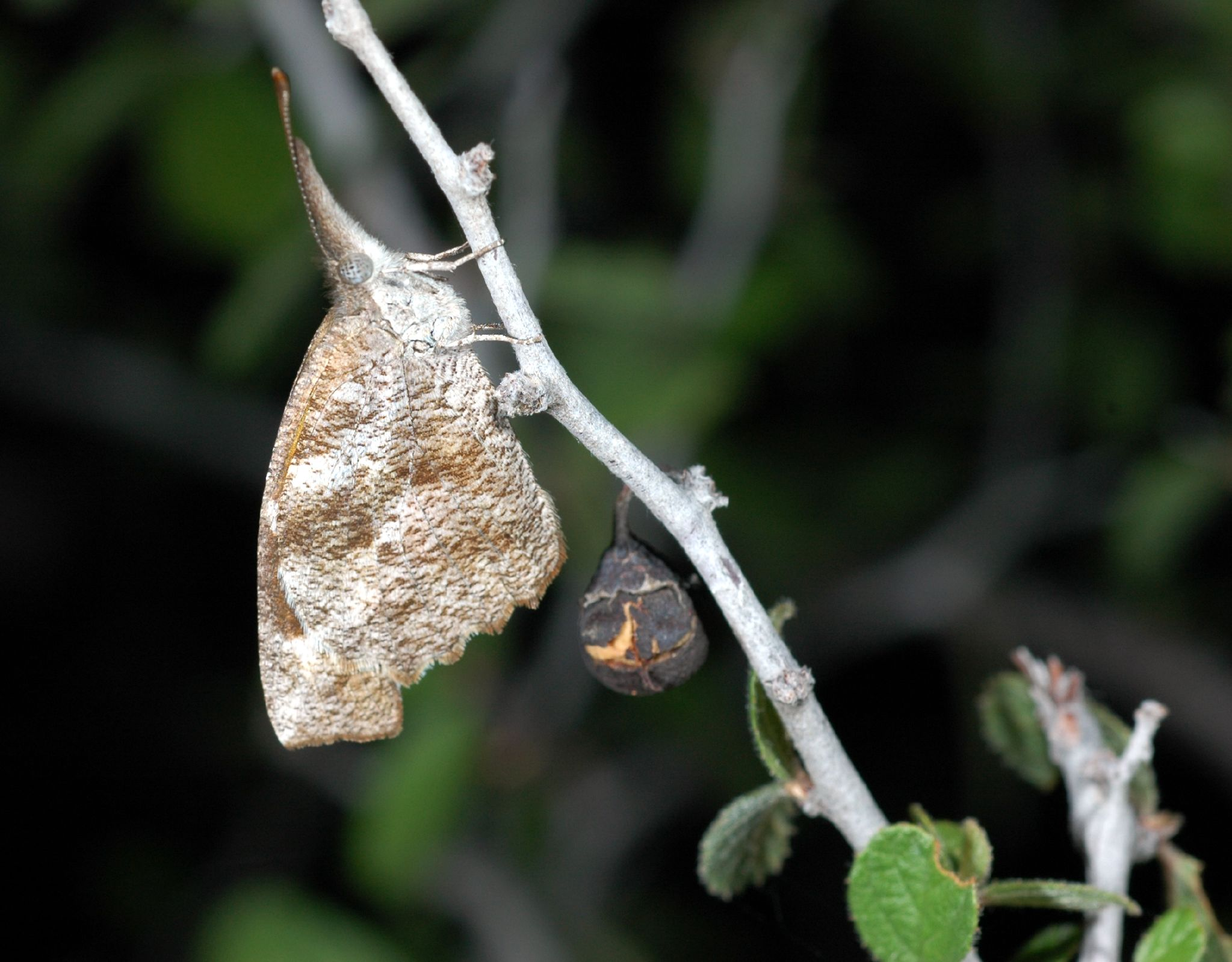
American snout, Libytheana carinenta

- American snout, Libytheana carinenta

== Subfamily Heliconiinae: heliconians and fritillaries ==
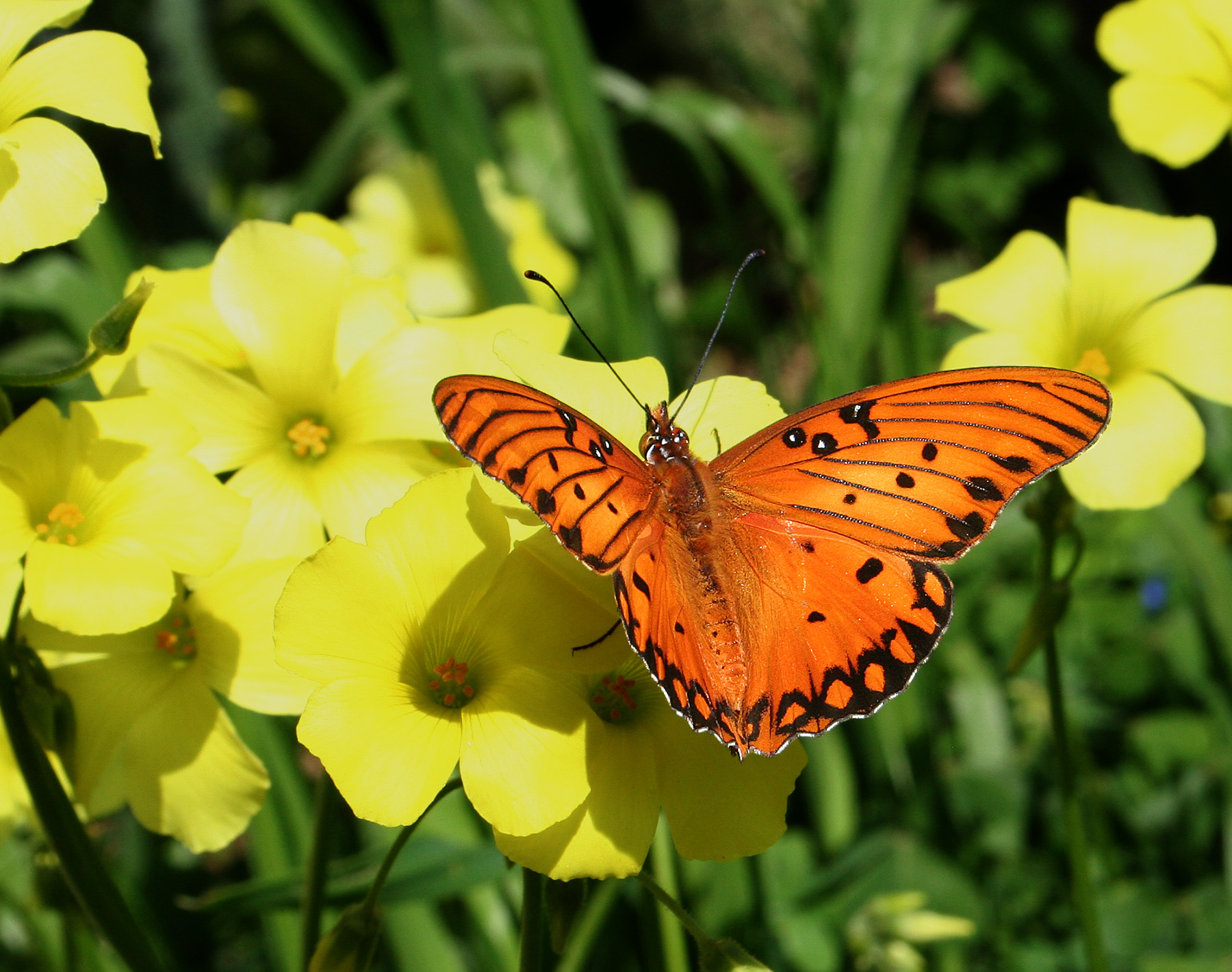
Gulf fritillary, Agraulis vanillae

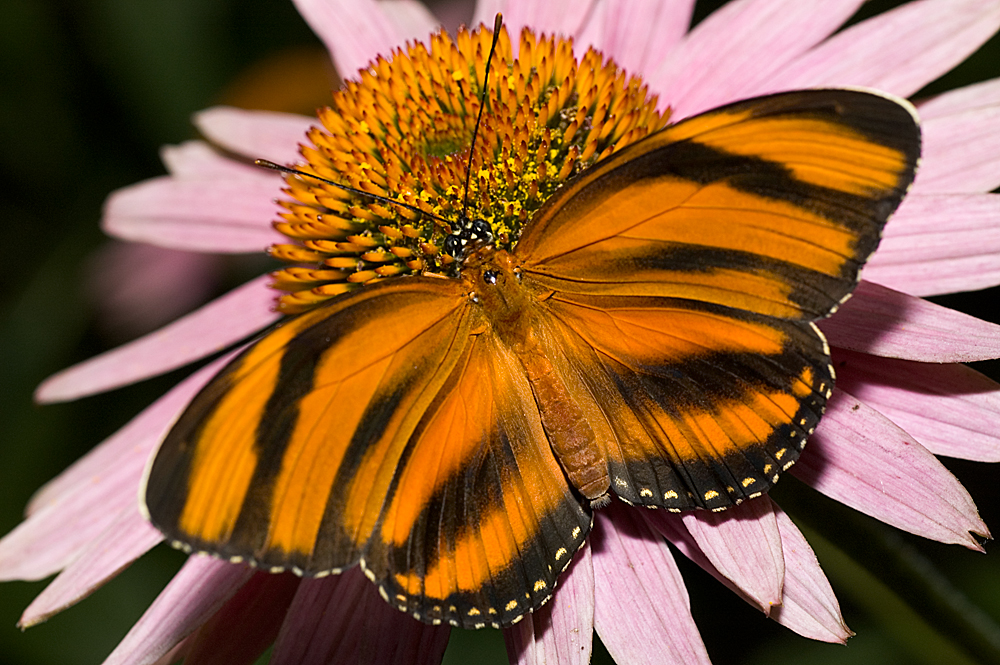
Banded orange heliconian, Dryadula phaetusa

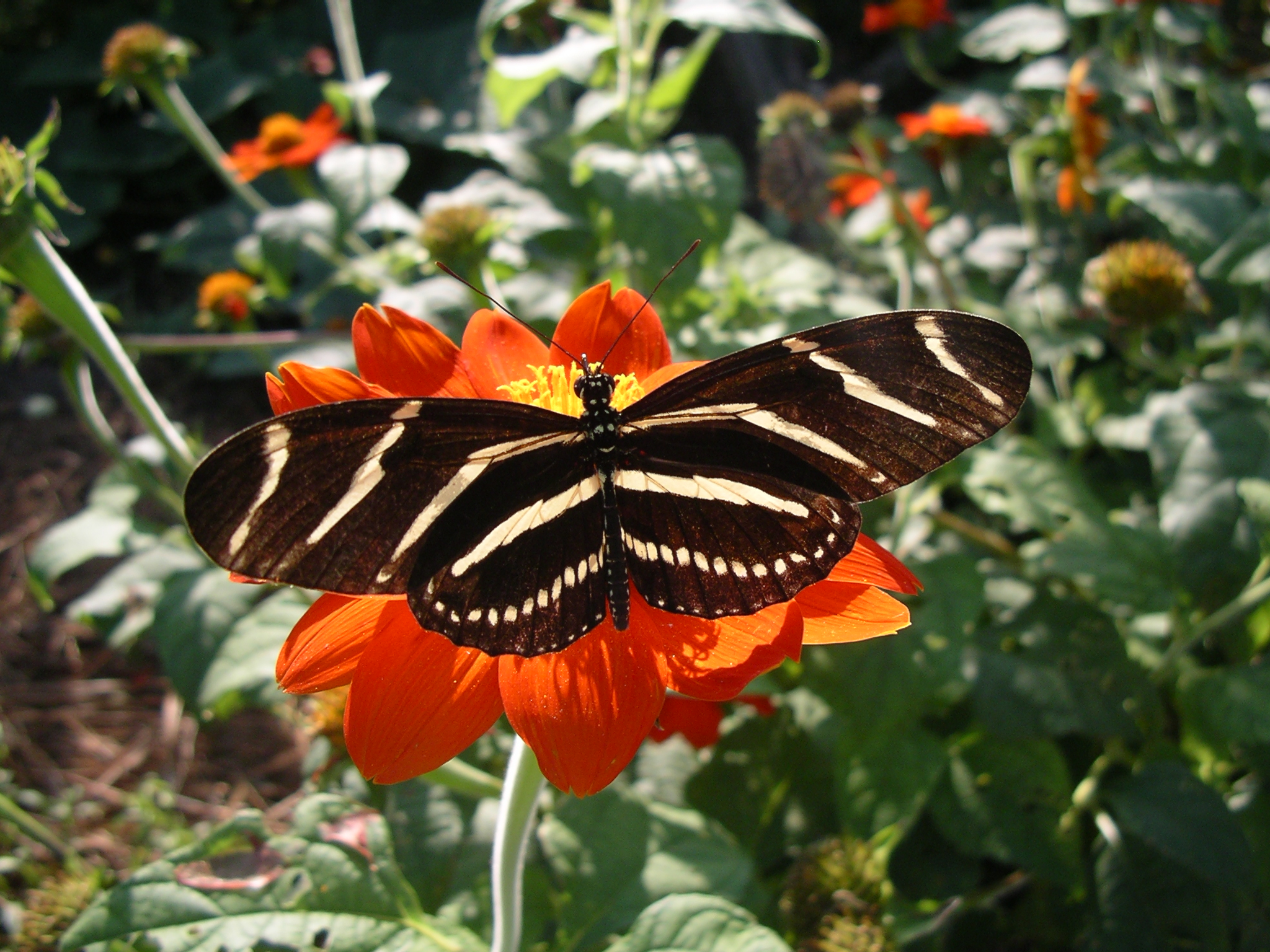
Zebra heliconian, Heliconius charithonia

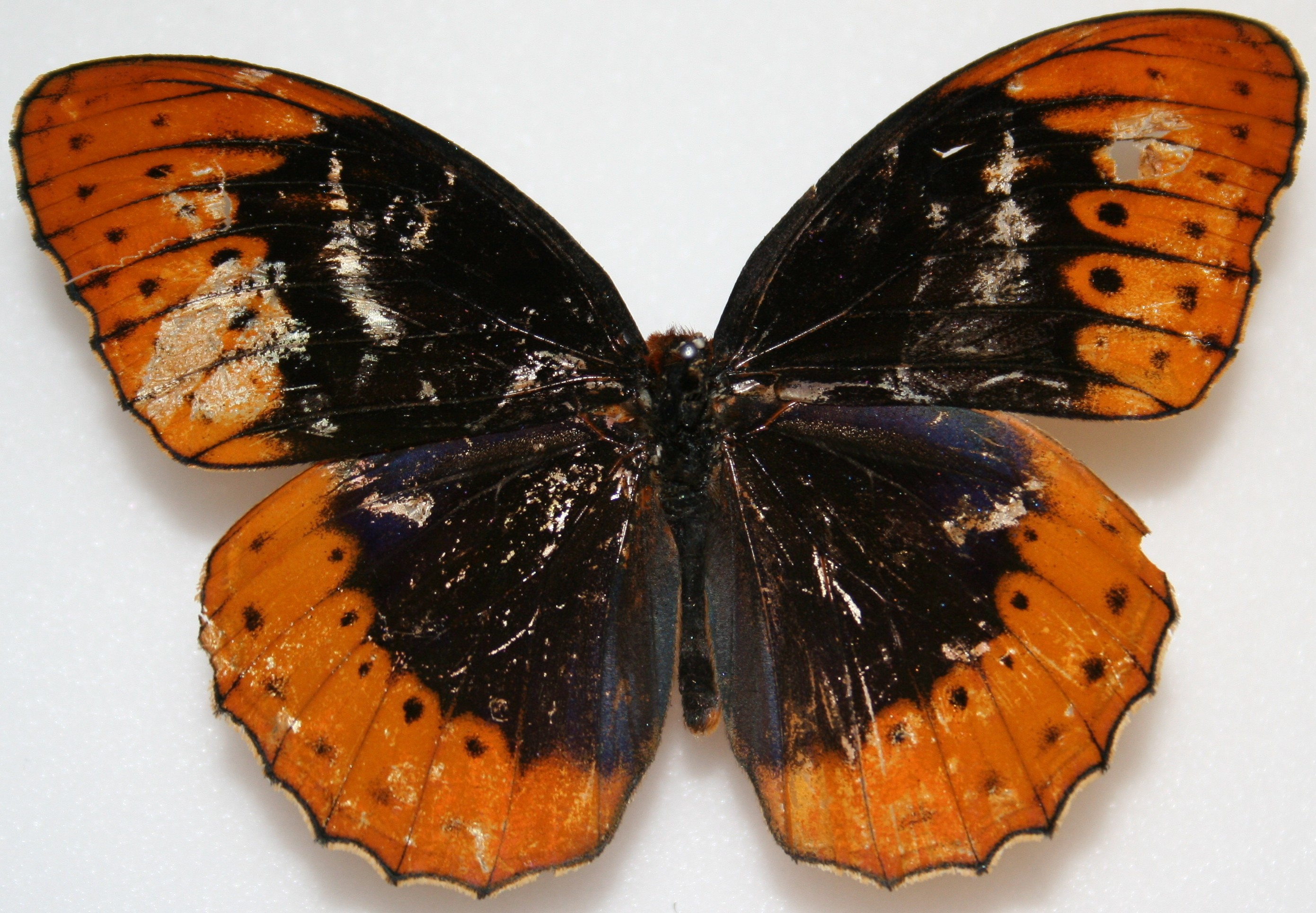
Male Diana fritillary, Speyeria diana

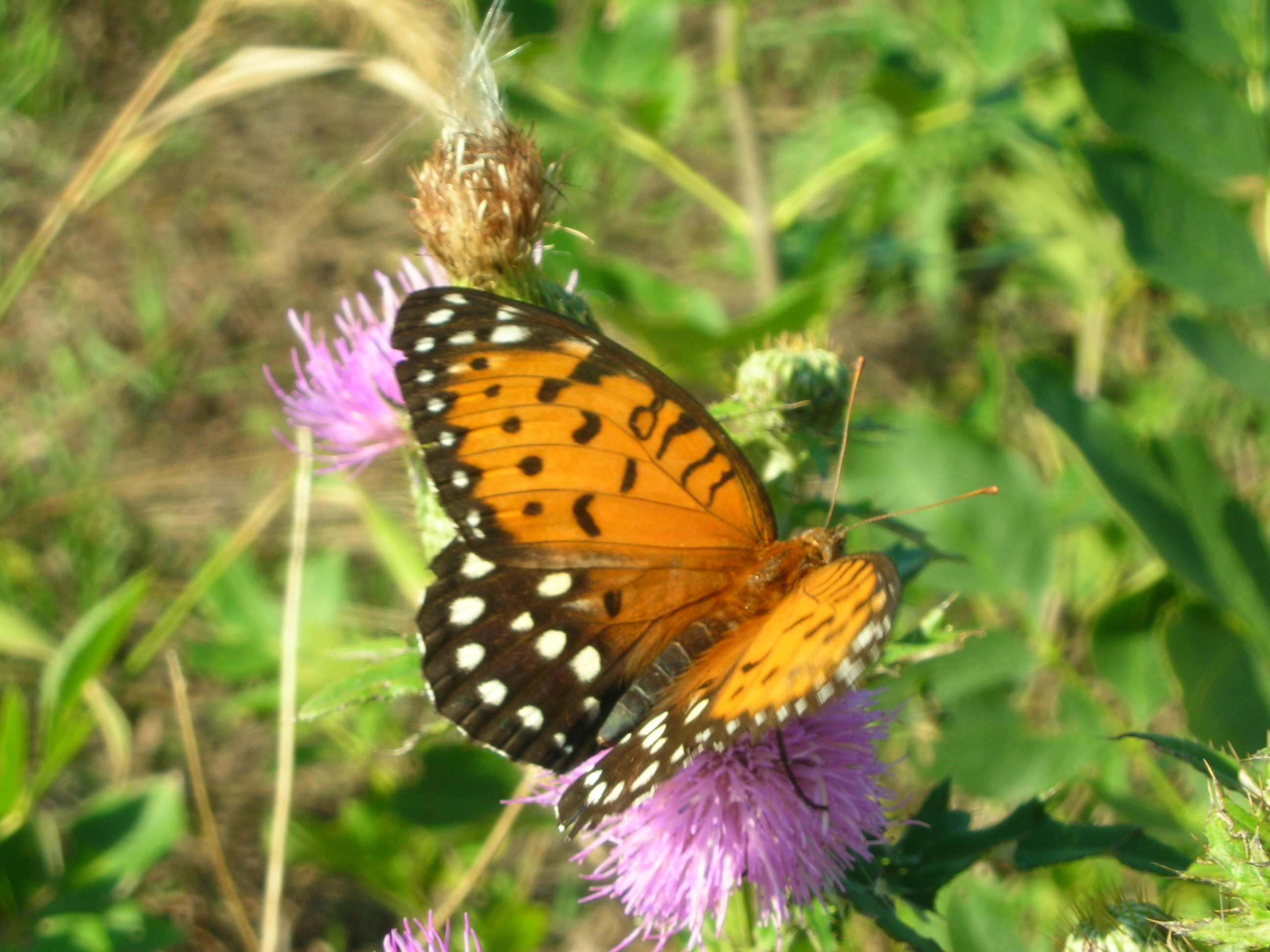
Female regal fritillary, Speyeria idalia

- Gulf fritillary, Agraulis vanillae
- Alberta fritillary, Boloria alberta
- Astarte fritillary, Boloria astarte
  - Distinct Astarte fritillary, Boloria astarte distincta
- Meadow fritillary, Boloria bellona
- Arctic fritillary, Boloria chariclea
- Pacific fritillary, Boloria epithore
- Bog fritillary, Boloria eunomia
- Freija fritillary, Boloria freija
- Frigga fritillary, Boloria frigga
- Dingy fritillary, Boloria improba
  - Uncompahgre dingy fritillary, Boloria improba acrocnema
  - Wind River dingy fritillary, Boloria improba harryi
- Relict fritillary, Boloria kriemhild
- Purplish fritillary, Boloria montinus
- Mountain fritillary, Boloria napaea
- Cryptic fritillary, Boloria natazhati
- Polaris fritillary, Boloria polaris
- Silver-bordered fritillary, Boloria selene
- Mexican silverspot, Dione moneta
- Banded orange heliconian, Dryadula phaetusa
- Julia heliconian, Dryas iulia
- Least heliconian, Euiedes aliphera
- Isabella's heliconian, Eueides isabella
- Variegated fritillary, Euptoieta claudia
- Mexican fritillary, Euptoieta hegesia
- Zebra heliconian, Heliconius charithonia
- Erato heliconian, Heliconius erato
- Tiger heliconian, Heliconius ismenius
- Unsilvered fritillary, Speyeria adiaste
- Aphrodite fritillary, Speyeria aphrodite
- Atlantis fritillary, Speyeria atlantis
- Callippe fritillary, Speyeria callippe
- Carol's fritillary, Speyeria carolae
- Coronis fritillary, Speyeria coronis
- Great spangled fritillary, Speyeria cybele
- Diana fritillary, Speyeria diana
- Edward's fritillary, Speyeria edwardsii
- Great Basin fritillary, Speyeria egleis
- Northwestern fritillary, Speyeria hesperis
- Hydaspe fritillary, Speyeria hydaspe
- Regal fritillary, Speyeria idalia
- Mormon fritillary, Speyeria mormonia
- Nokomis fritillary, Speyeria nokomis
- Zerene fritillary, Speyeria zerene

== Subfamily Nymphalinae: true brushfoots ==
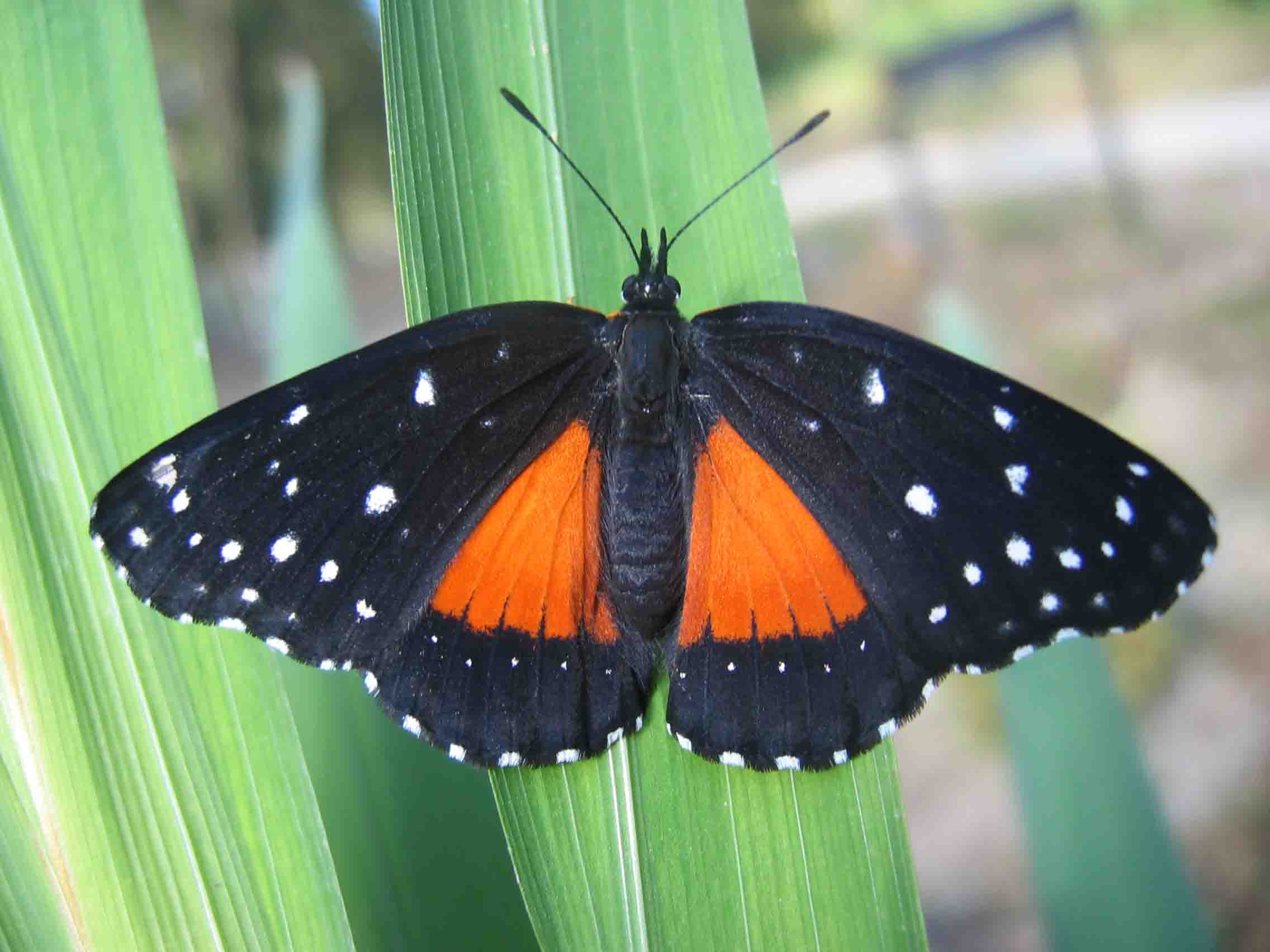
Rosita patch, Chlosyne rosita

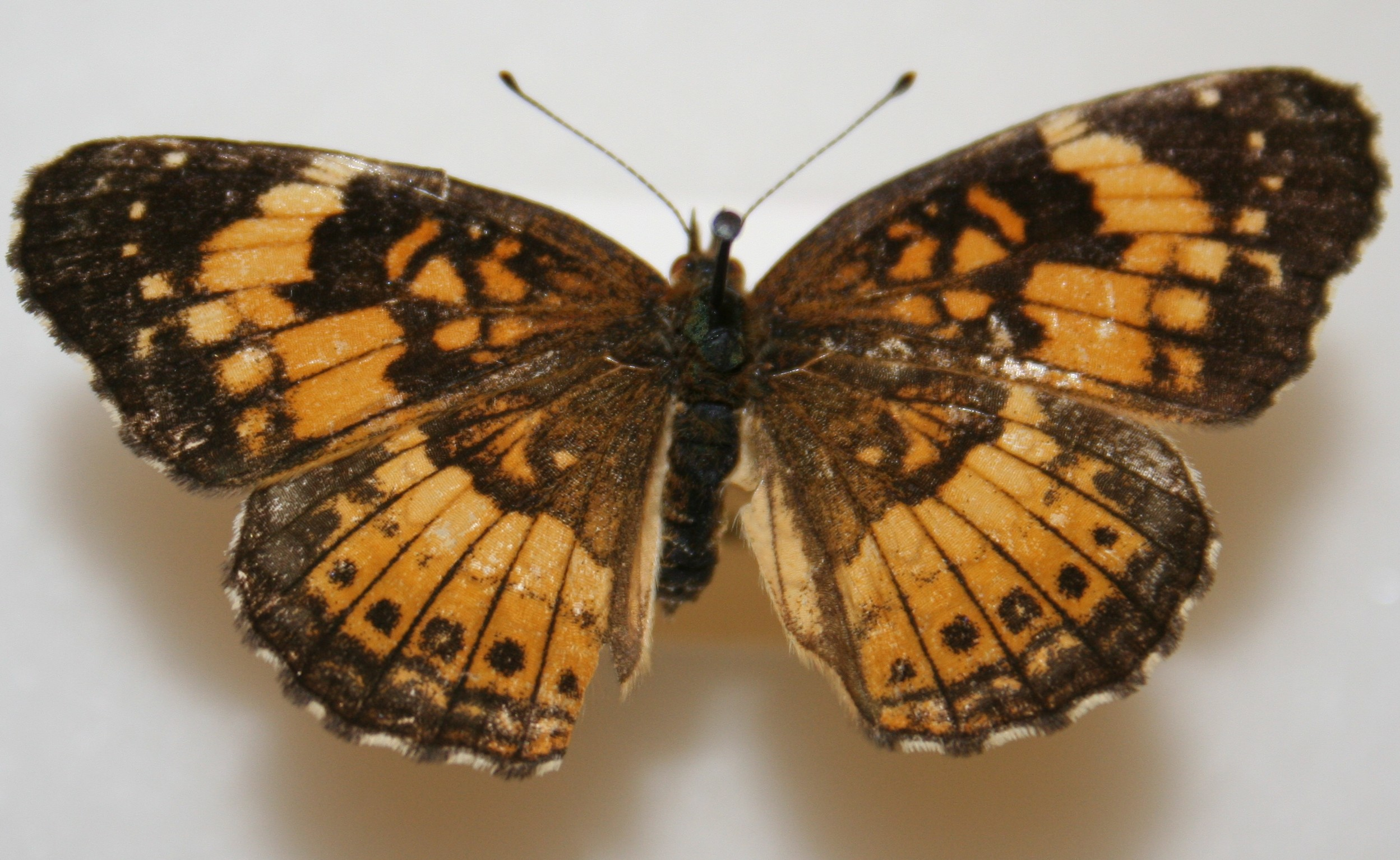
Silvery checkerspot, Chlosyne nycteis

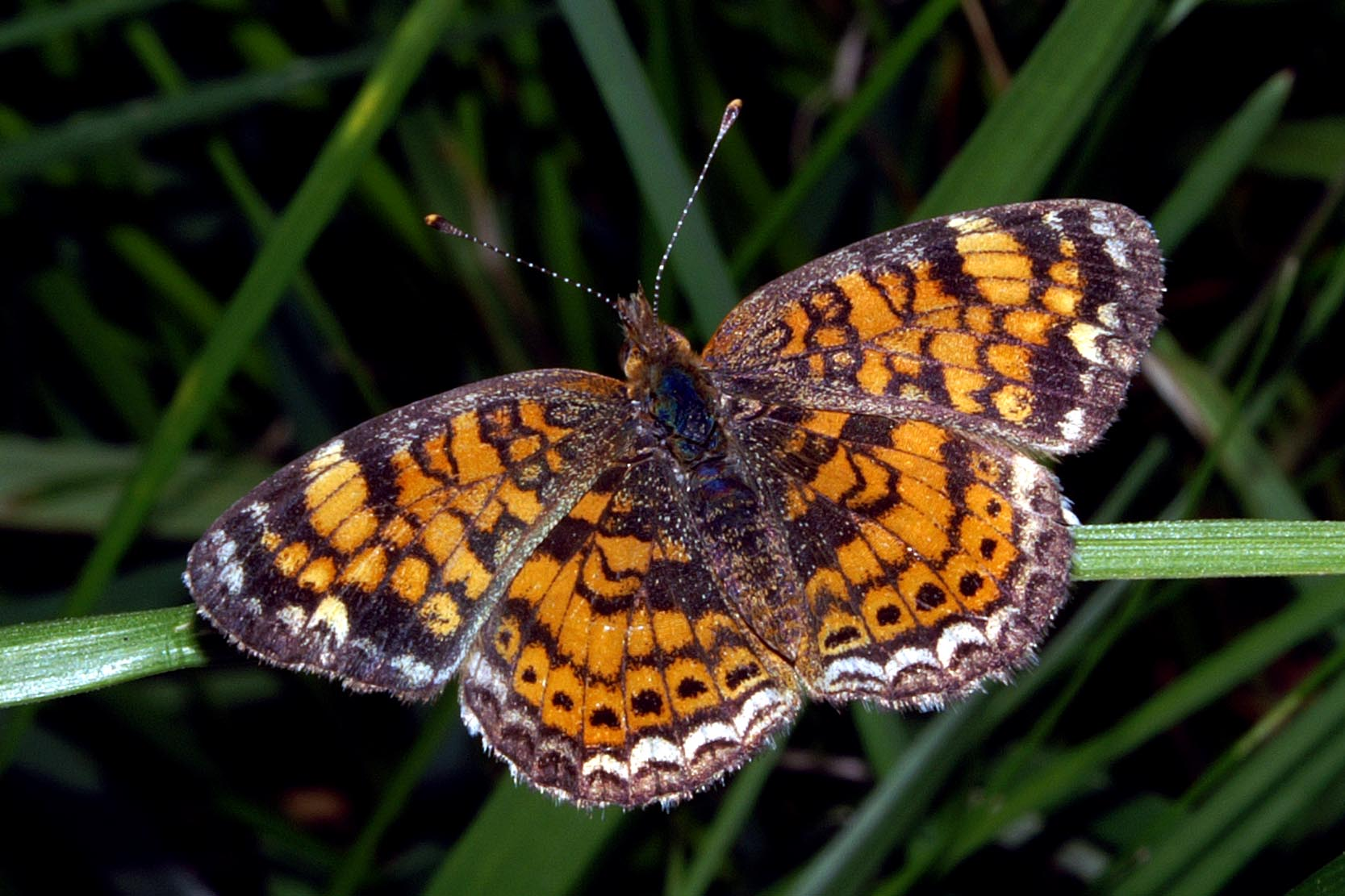
Pearl crescent, Phyciodes tharos

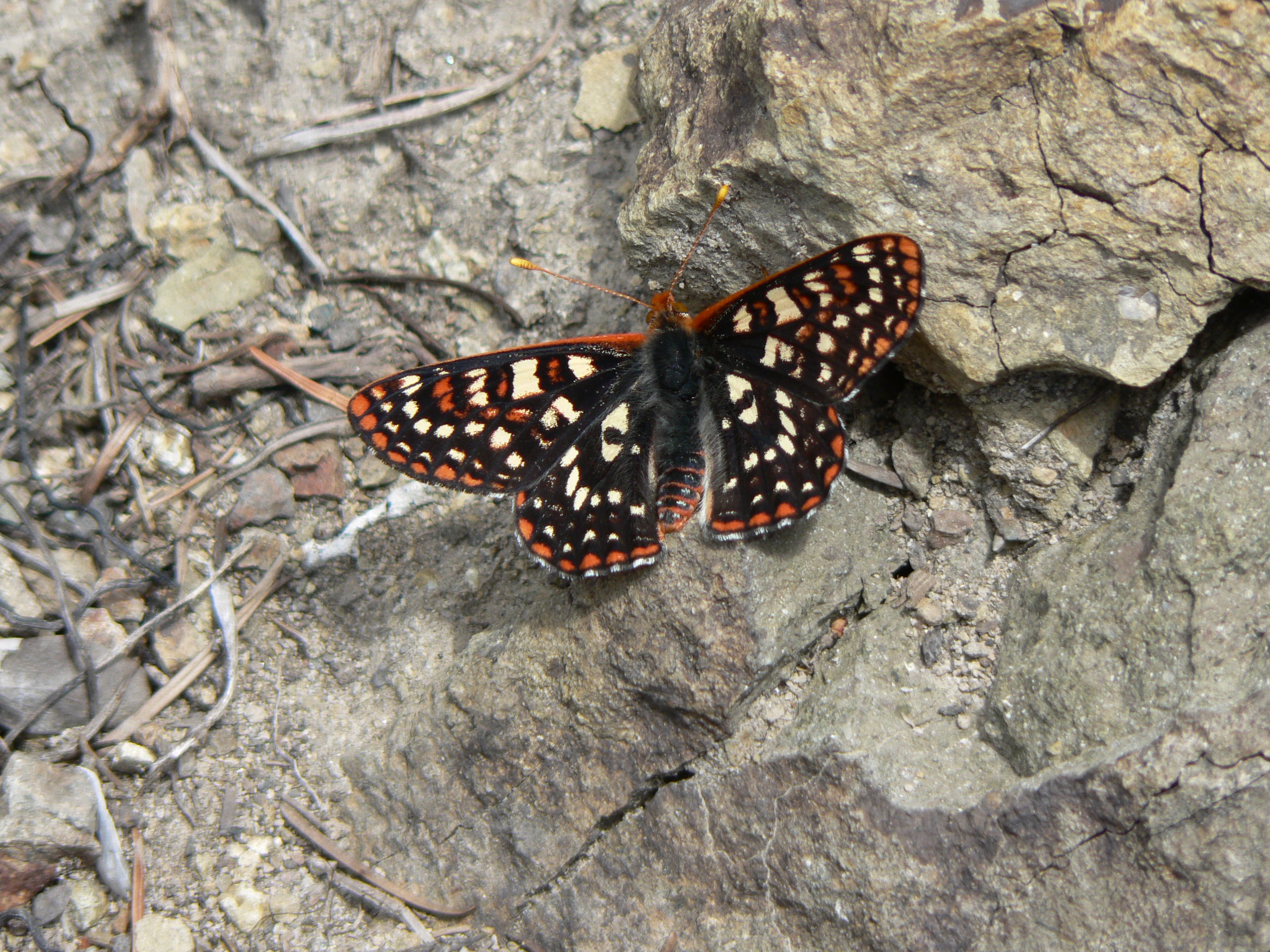
Variable checkerspot, Euphydryas chalcedona

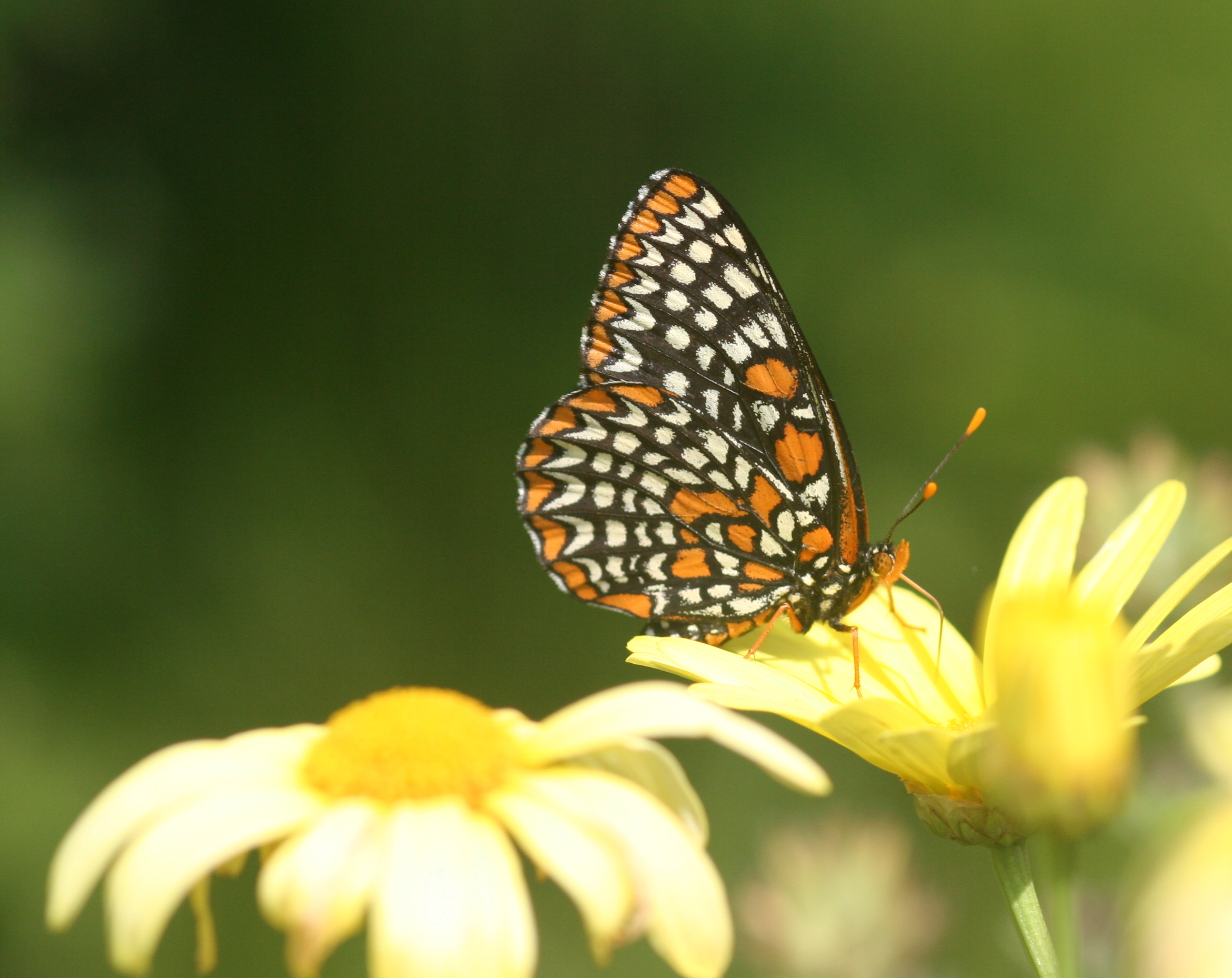
Baltimore checkerspot, Euphydryas phaeton

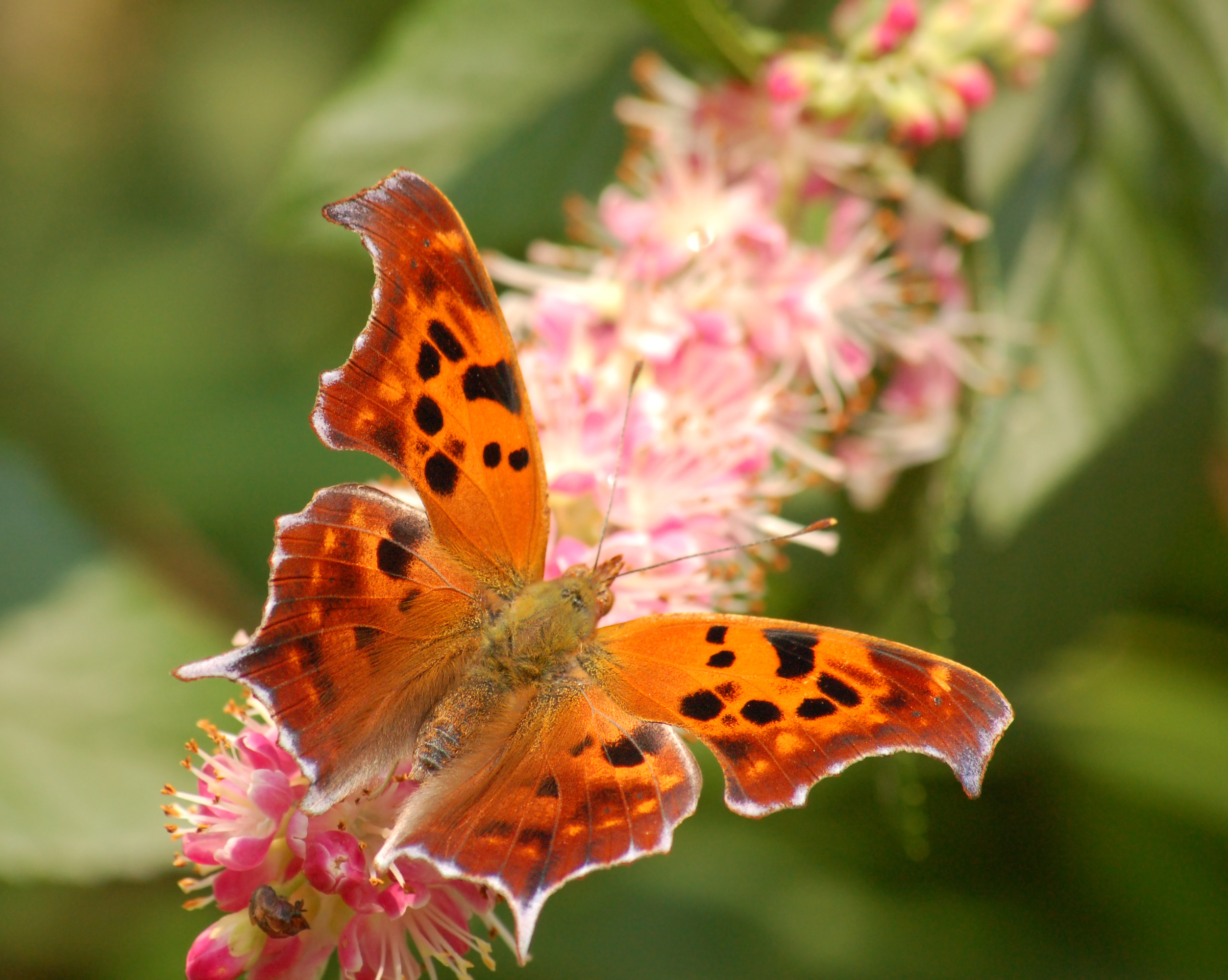
Question mark, Polygonia interrogationis

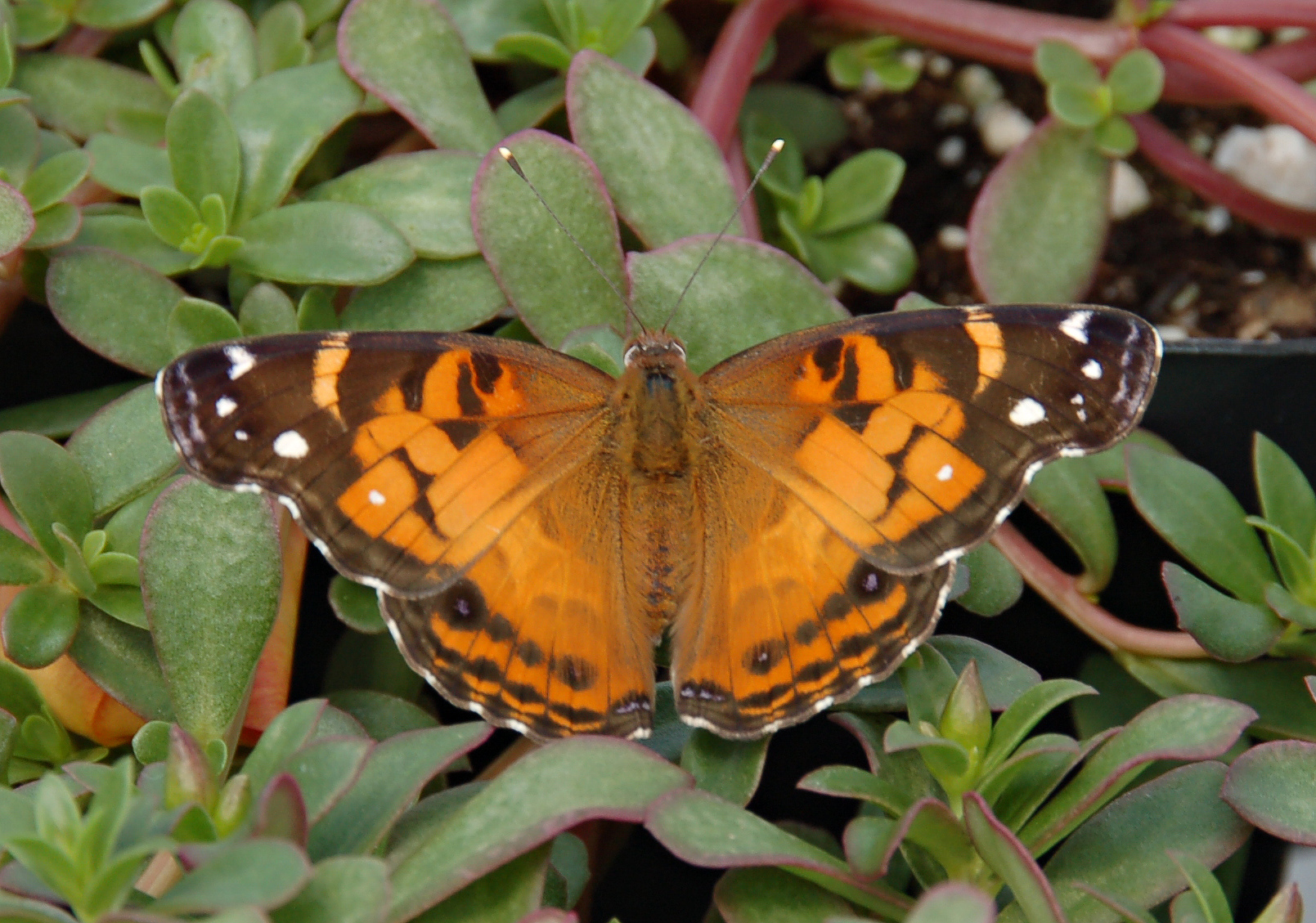
American lady, Vanessa virginiensis

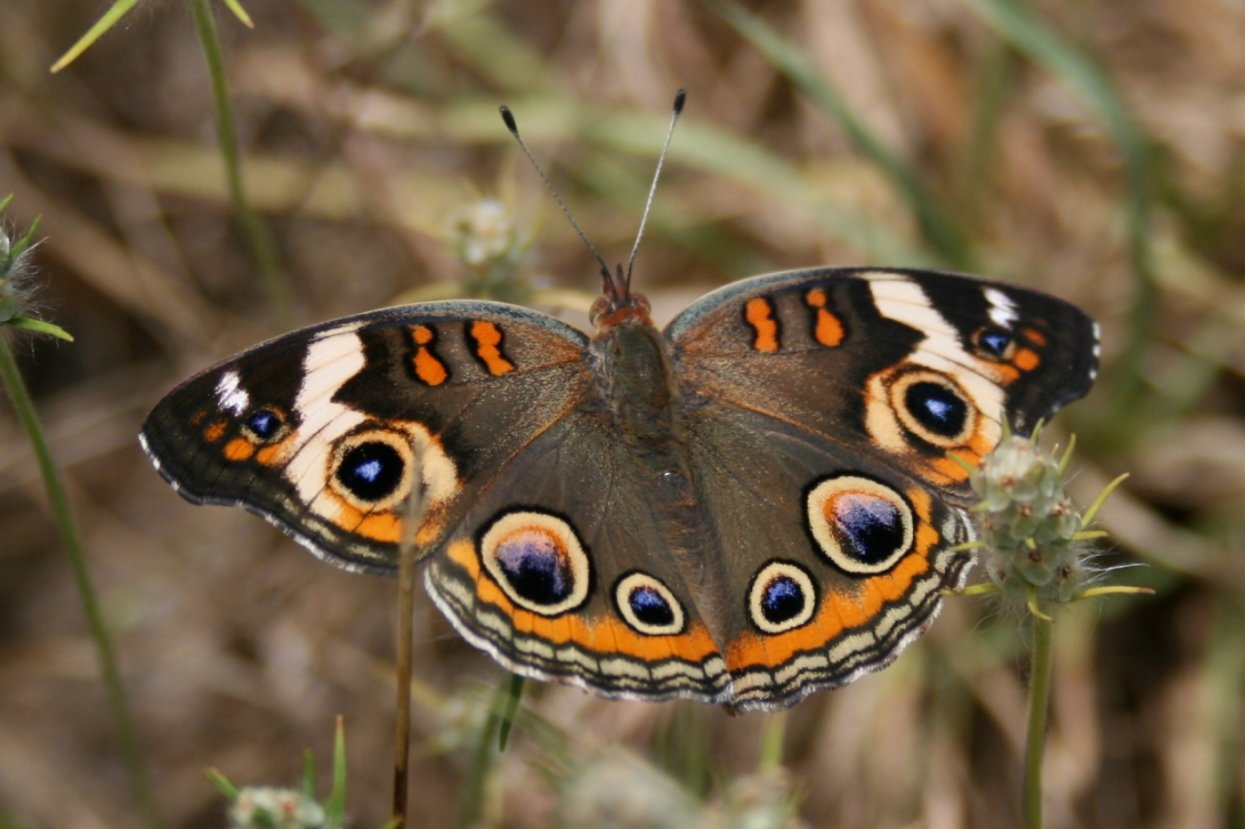
Common buckeye, Junonia coenia

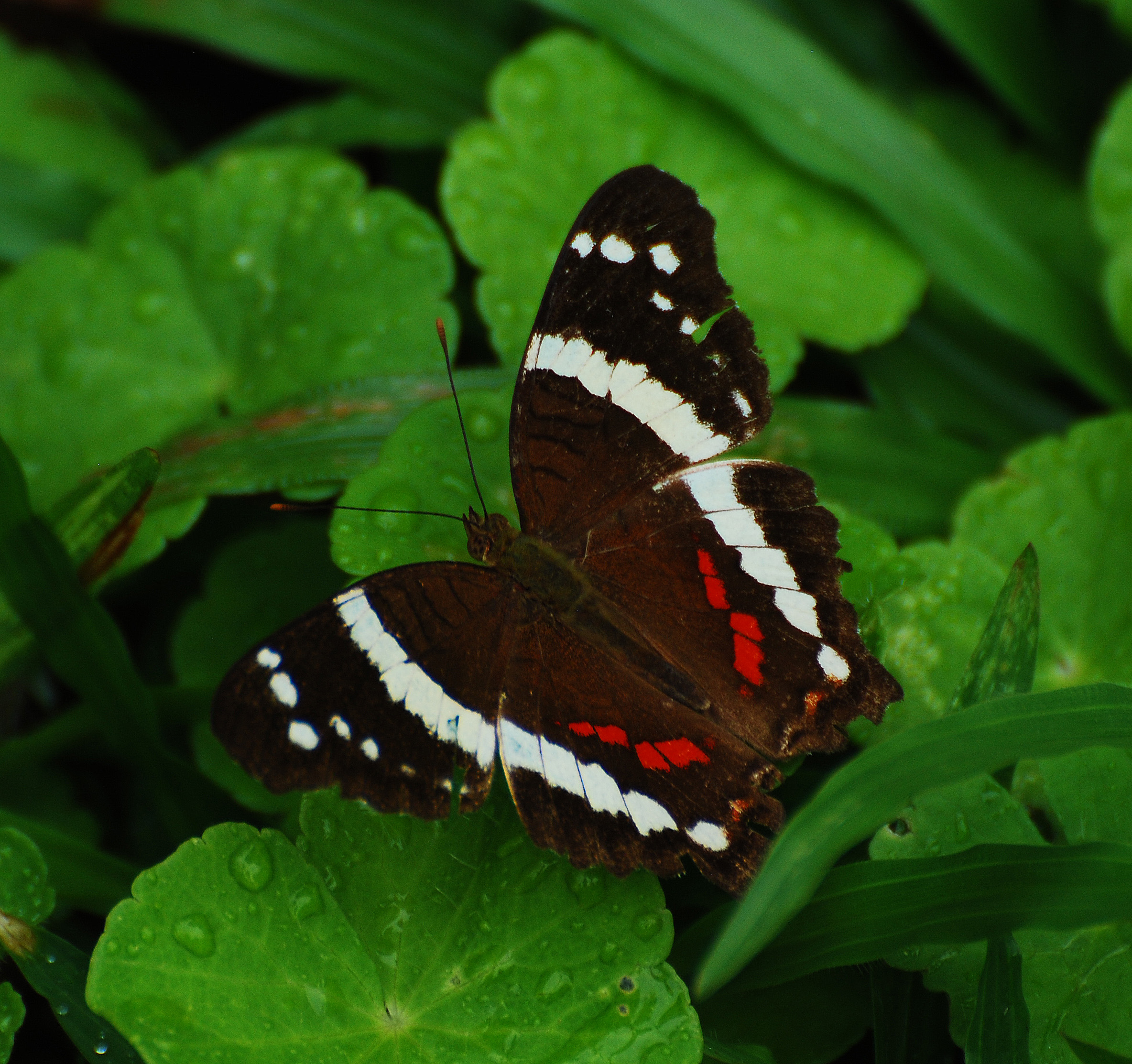
Banded peacock, Anartia fatima

- Dotted checkerspot, Poladryas minuta
- Arachne checkerspot, Poladryas arachne
- Theona checkerspot, Thessalia theona
- Chinati checkerspot, Thessalia chinatiensis
- Black checkerspot, Thessalia cyneas
- Fulvia checkerspot, Thessalia fulvia
- Leanira checkerspot, Thessalia leanira
- California patch, Chlosyne californica
- Bordered patch, Chlosyne lacinia
- Definite patch, Chlosyne definita
- Banded patch, Chlosyne endeis
- Crimson patch, Chlosyne janais
- Rosita patch, Chlosyne rosita
- Red-spotted patch, Chlosyne melitaeoides
- Gorgone checkerspot, Chlosyne gorgone
- Silvery checkerspot, Chlosyne nycteis
- Harris's checkerspot, Chlosyne harrisii
- Nuevo León checkerspot, Chlosyne kendallorum
- Northern checkerspot, Chlosyne palla
- Rockslide checkerspot, Chlosyne whitneyi
- Sagebrush checkerspot, Chlosyne acastus
- Gabb's checkerspot, Chlosyne gabbii
- Hoffmann's checkerspot, Chlosyne hoffmanni
- Elf, Microtia elva
- Tiny checkerspot, Dymasia dymas
  - Dymasia dymas chara
- Elada checkerspot, Texola elada
- Smudged crescent, Castilia eranites
- Texan crescent, Phyciodes texana
  - Texan Texan crescent, Phyciodes texana texana
  - Seminole Texan crescent, Phyciodes texana seminole
- Cuban crescent, Phyciodes frisia
- Pale-banded crescent, Phyciodes tulcis
- Orange-patched crescent, Phyciodes drusilla
- Ardent crescent, Phyciodes ardys
- Black crescent, Phyciodes ptolyca
- Pine crescent, Phyciodes sitalces
- Chestnut crescent, Phyciodes argentea
- Vesta crescent, Phyciodes vesta
- Phaon crescent, Phyciodes phaon
- Pearl crescent, Phyciodes tharos
- Northern crescent, Phyciodes cocyta
  - Diminutive northern crescent, Phyciodes cocyta diminutor
  - Mimic northern crescent, Phyciodes cocyta incognitus
- Tawny crescent, Phyciodes batesii
- Field crescent, Phyciodes campestris
- Painted crescent, Phyciodes picta
- California crescent, Phyciodes orseis
- Pale crescent, Phyciodes pallida
- Mylitta crescent, Phyciodes mylitta
- Gillett's checkerspot, Euphydryas gillettii
- Variable checkerspot, Euphydryas chalcedona
  - Chalcedon variable checkerspot, Euphydryas chalcedona chalcedona
  - Snowberry variable checkerspot, Euphydryas chalcedona colon
  - Anicia variable checkerspot, Euphydryas chalcedona anicia
- Edith's checkerspot, Euphydryas editha
- Baltimore checkerspot, Euphydryas phaeton
- Question mark, Polygonia interrogationis
- Eastern comma, Polygonia comma
- Satyr comma, Polygonia satyrus
- Green comma, Polygonia faunus
  - Green green comma, Polygonia faunus faunus
  - Polygonia faunus hylas
  - Sylvan green comma, Polygonia faunus silvius
- Hoary comma, Polygonia gracilis
  - Zephyr hoary comma, Polygonia gracilis zephyrus
- Oreas comma, Polygonia oreas
- Gray comma, Polygonia progne
- Compton tortoiseshell, Nymphalis vaualbum
- California tortoiseshell, Nymphalis californica
- Mourning cloak, Nymphalis antiopa
- Milbert's tortoiseshell, Aglais milberti
- Small tortoiseshell, Aglais urticae
- American lady, Vanessa virginiensis
- Painted lady, Vanessa cardui
- West Coast lady, Vanessa annabella
- Red admiral, Vanessa atalanta
- Orange mapwing, Hypanartia lethe
- Mimic, Hypolimnas misippus
- Common buckeye, Junonia coenia
- Gray buckeye, Junonia grisea
- Mangrove buckeye, Junonia neildi
- Dark buckeye, Junonia nigrosuffusa
- Twintip buckeye, Junonia stemosa
- Caribbean buckeye, Junonia zonalis
- White peacock, Anartia jatrophae
- Cuban peacock, Anartia chrysopelea
- Banded peacock, Anartia fatima
- Malachite, Siproeta stelenes
- Rusty-tipped page, Siproeta epaphus

== Subfamily Limenitidinae: admirals, sisters and others ==
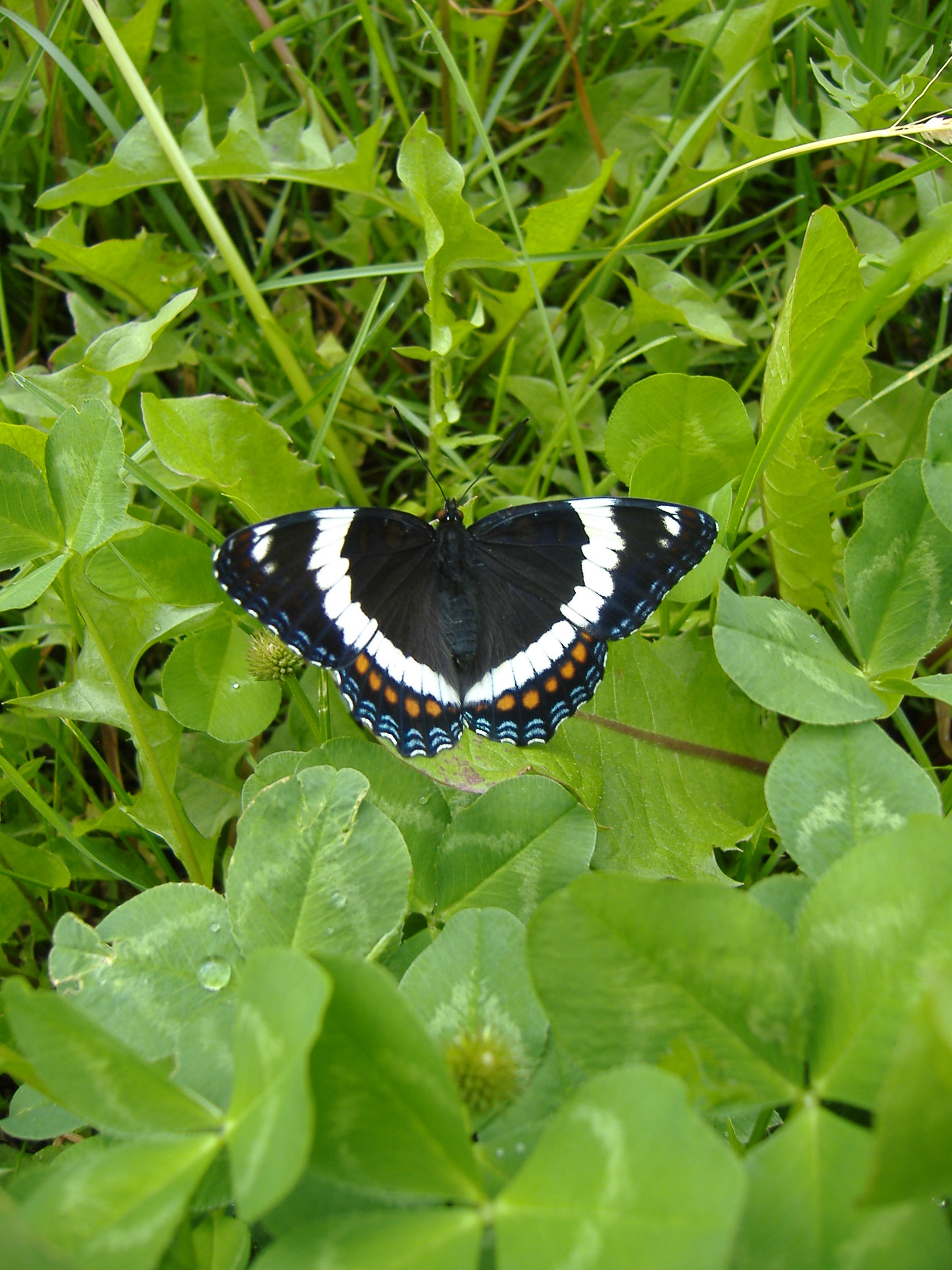
White admiral, Limenitis arthemis rubrofasciata

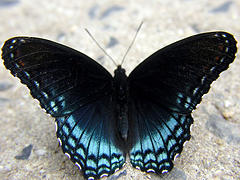
Red-spotted purple, Limenitis arthemis astyanax

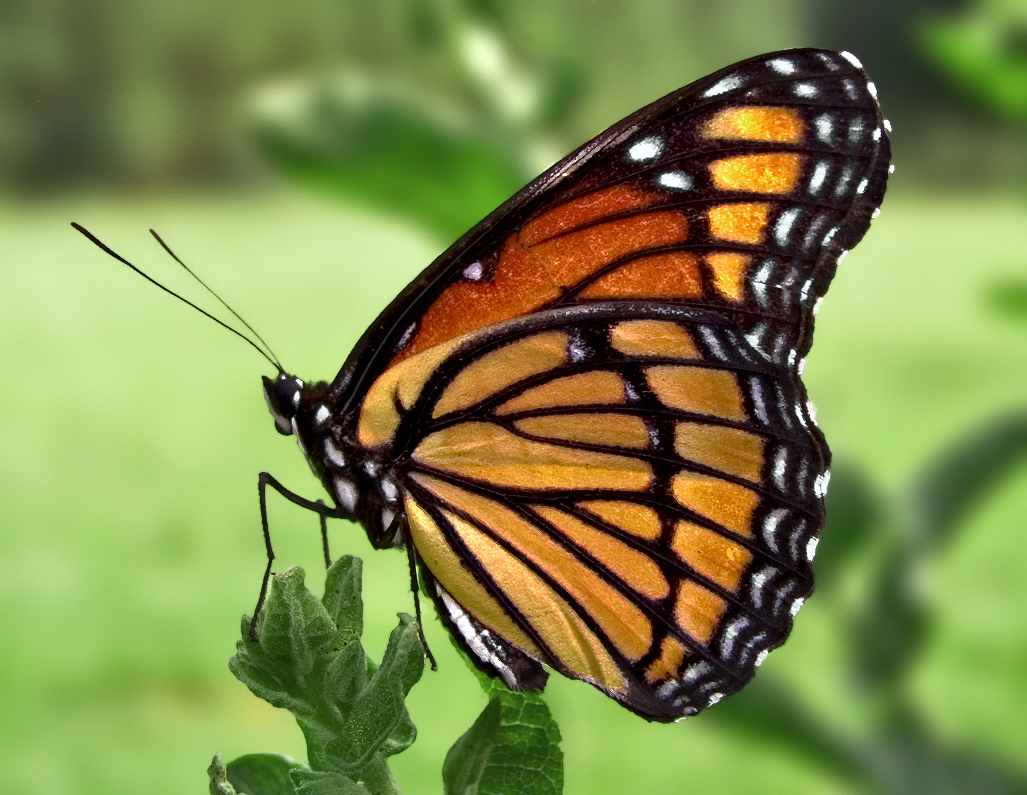
Viceroy, Limenitis archippus

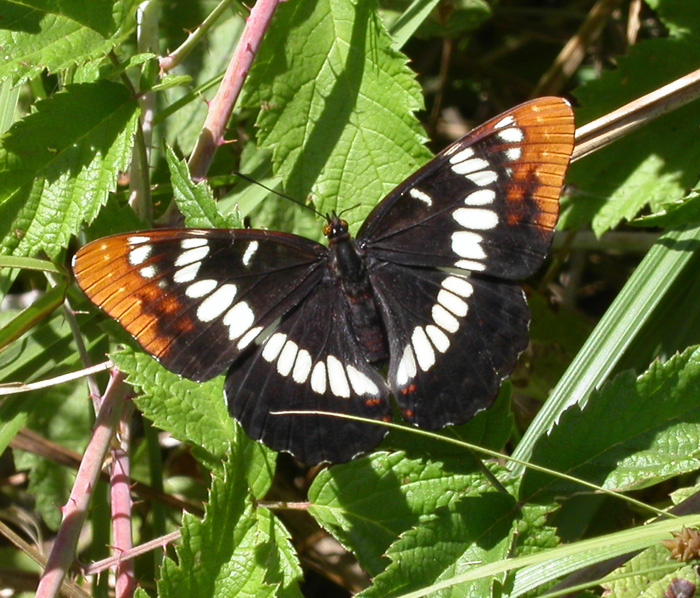
Lorquin's admiral, Limenitis lorquini

- Red-spotted admiral, Limenitis arthemis
  - White admiral, Limenitis arthemis arthemis
  - Red-spotted purple, Limenitis arthemis astyanax
- Viceroy, Limenitis archippus
- Weidemeyer's admiral, Limenitis weidemeyerii
- Lorquin's admiral, Limenitis lorquini
- Band-celled sister, Adelpha fessonia
- California sister, Adelpha bredowii
- Eyed sister, Adelpha paroeca
- Spot-celled sister, Adelpha basiloides
- Mexican sister, Adelpha diazi
- Rayed sister, Adelpha lycorias melanthe
- Common banner, Epiphile adrasta
- Orange banner, Temenis laothoe
- Mexican bluewing, Myscelia ethusa
- Blackened bluewing, Myscelia cyanathe
- Tropical blue wave, Myscelia cyaniris
- Dingy purplewing, Eunica monima
- Florida purplewing, Eunica tatila
- Four-spotted sailor, Dynamine postverta
- Blue-eyed sailor, Dynamine dyonis
- Small-eyed sailor, Dynamine artisemia
- Orange-striped eighty-eight, Diaethria pandama
- Common Mestra, Mestra amymone
- Red rim, Biblis hyperia
- Red cracker, Hamadryas amphinome
- Gray cracker, Hamadryas februa
- Variable cracker, Hamadryas feronia
- Glaucous cracker, Hamadryas glauconome
- Pale cracker, Hamadryas amphichloe
- Guatemalan cracker, Hamadryas guatemalena
- Black-patched cracker, Hamadryas atlantis
- Orion cecropian, Historis odius
- Tailed cecropian, Historis acheronta
- Blomfild's beauty, Smyrna blomfildia
- Waiter daggerwing, Marpesia coresia
- Many-banded daggerwing, Marpesia chiron
- Ruddy daggerwing, Marpesia petreus
- Antillean daggerwing, Marpesia eleuchea

== Subfamily Charaxinae: leafwings ==
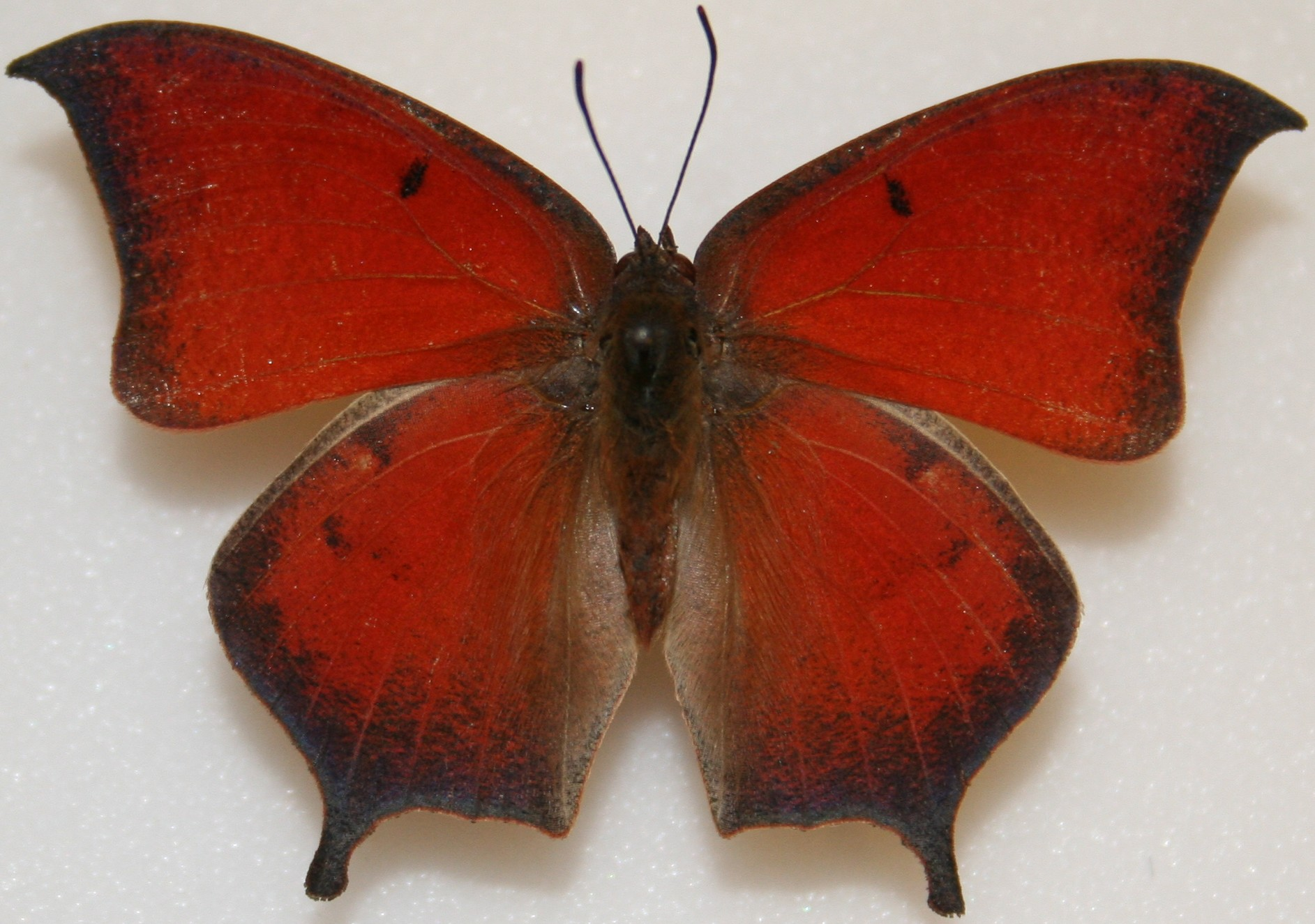
Tropical leafwing, Anaea aidea

- Tropical leafwing, Anaea aidea
- Goatweed leafwing, Anaea andria
- Pointed leafwing, Anaea eurypyle
- Florida leafwing, Anaea floridalis
- Guatemalan leafwing, Anaea forreri
- Angled leafwing, Anaea glycerium
- Pale-spotted leafwing, Anaea pithyusa
- One-spotted prepona, Archaeoprepona demophon

== Subfamily Apaturinae: emperors ==
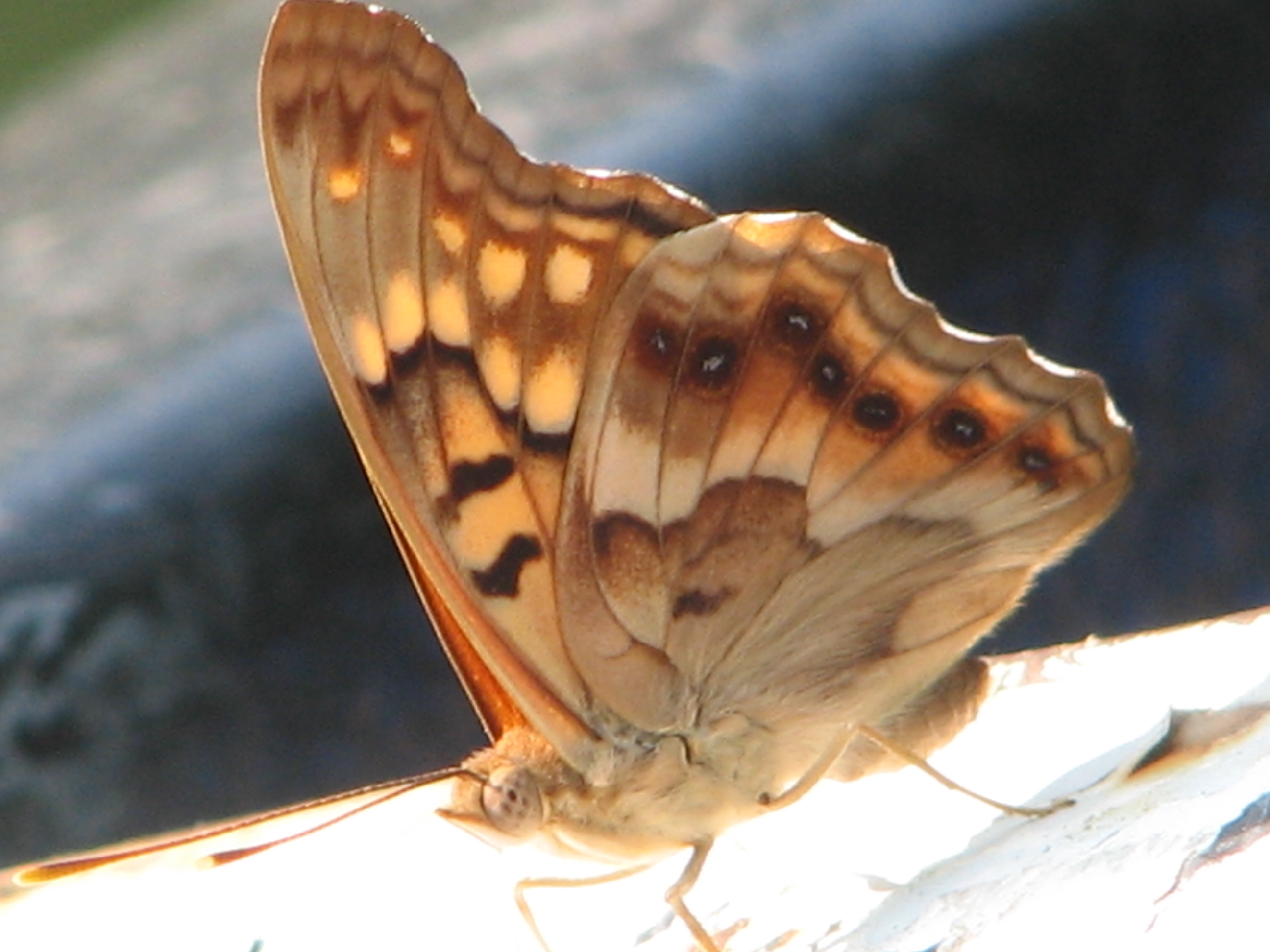
Tawny emperor, Asterocampa clyton

- Hackberry emperor, Asterocampa celtis
- Tawny emperor, Asterocampa clyton
- Cream-banded dusky emperor, Asterocampa idyja argus
- Empress Leilia, Asterocampa leilia
- Silver emperor, Doxocopa laure
- Pavon emperor, Doxocopa pavon

== Subfamily Morphinae: morphos ==
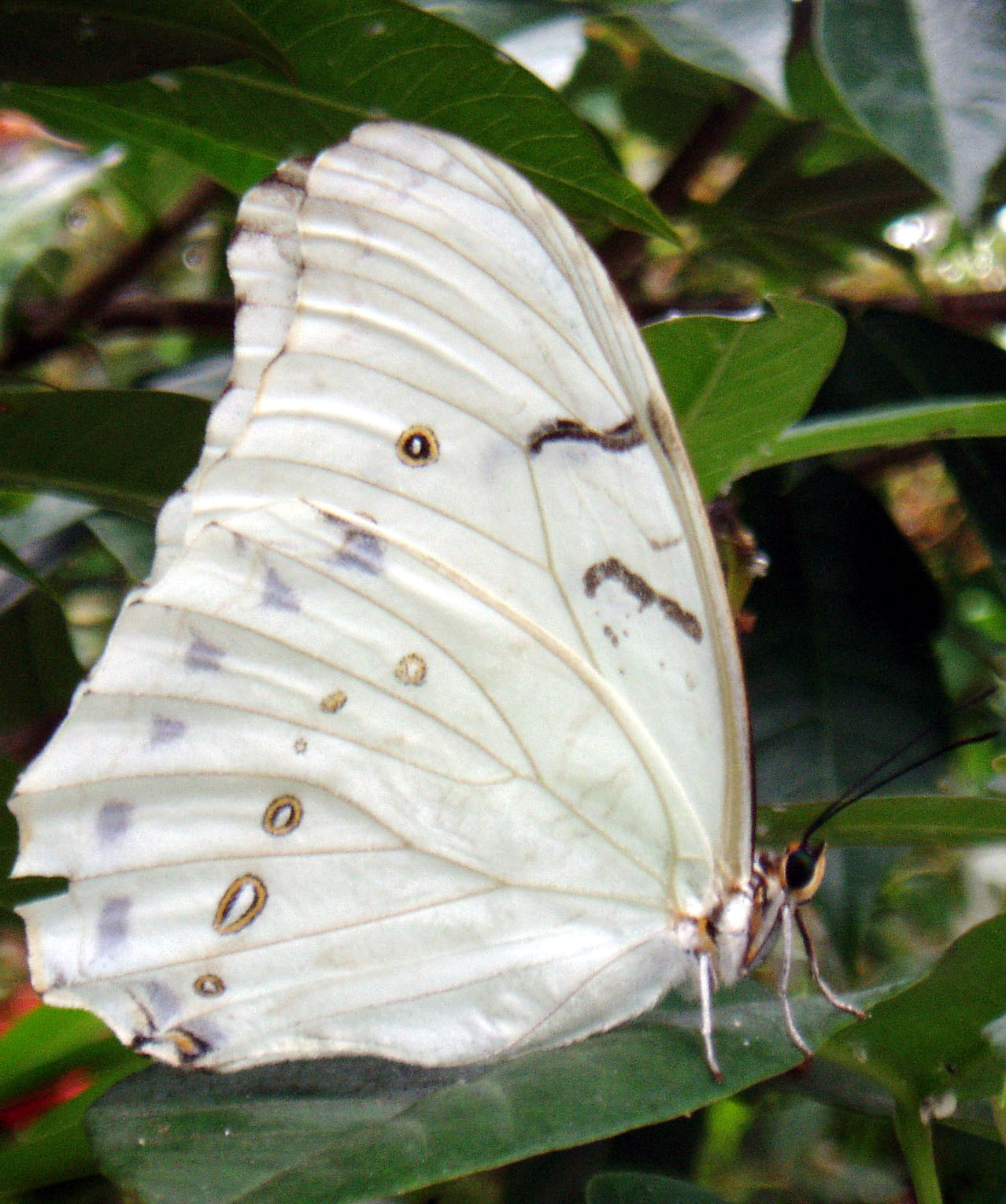
White morpho, Morpho polyphemus

- White morpho, Morpho polyphemus
- Split-banded owlet, Opsiphanes cassina
- Orange owlet, Opsiphanes boisduvalii

== Subfamily Satyrinae: satyrs ==
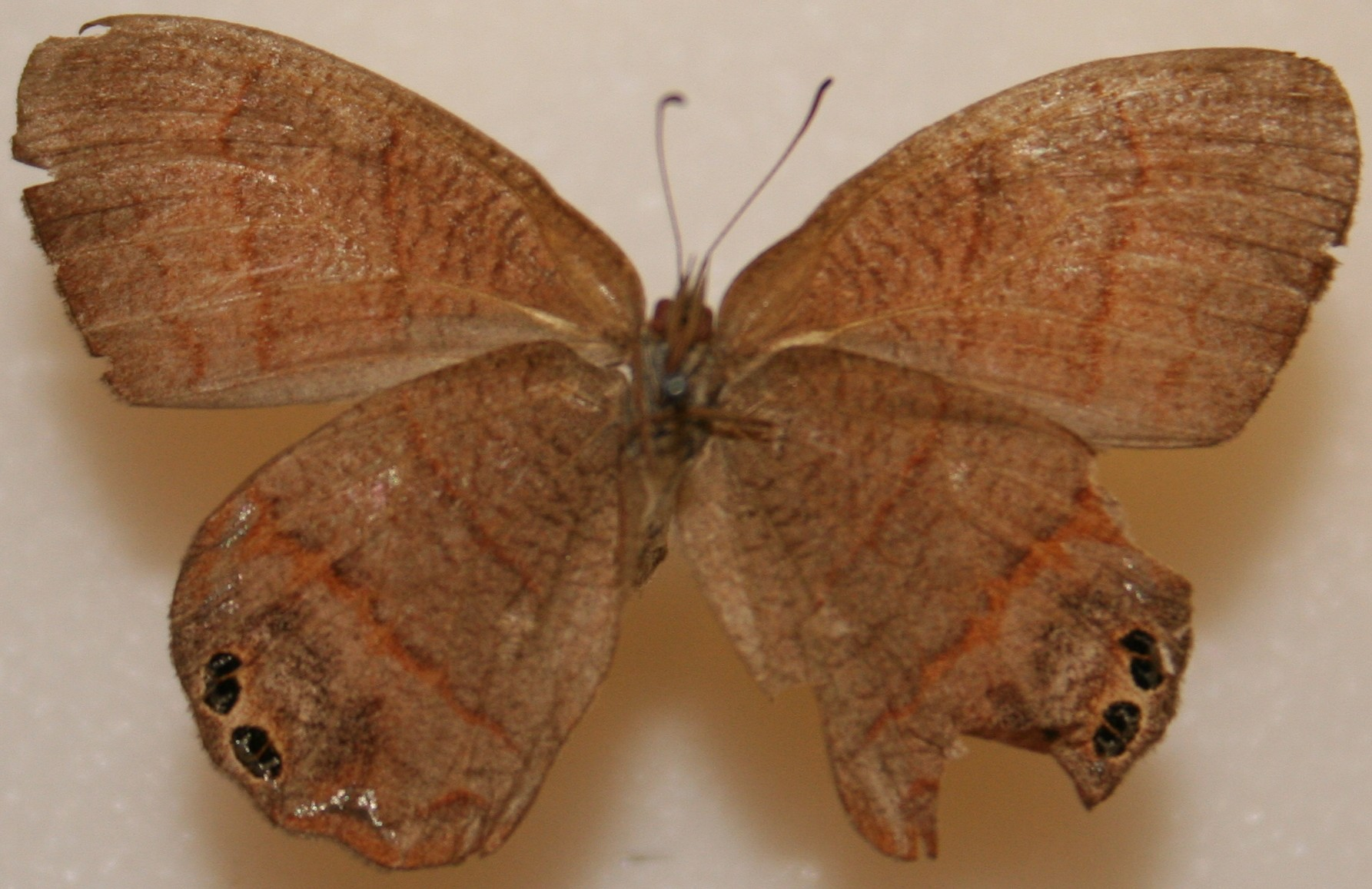
Nabokov's satyr, Cyllopsis pyracmon

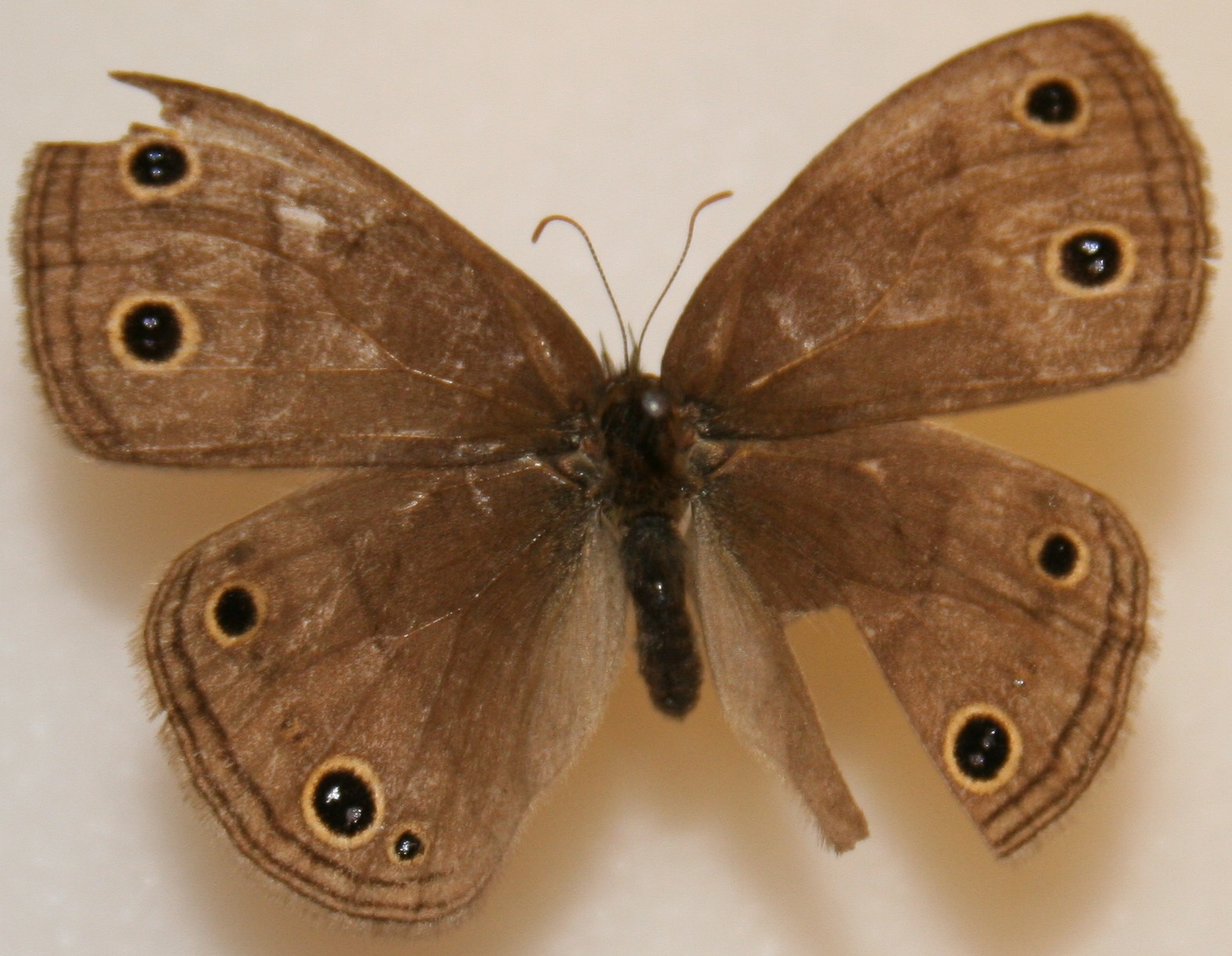
Little wood-satyr, Megisto cymela

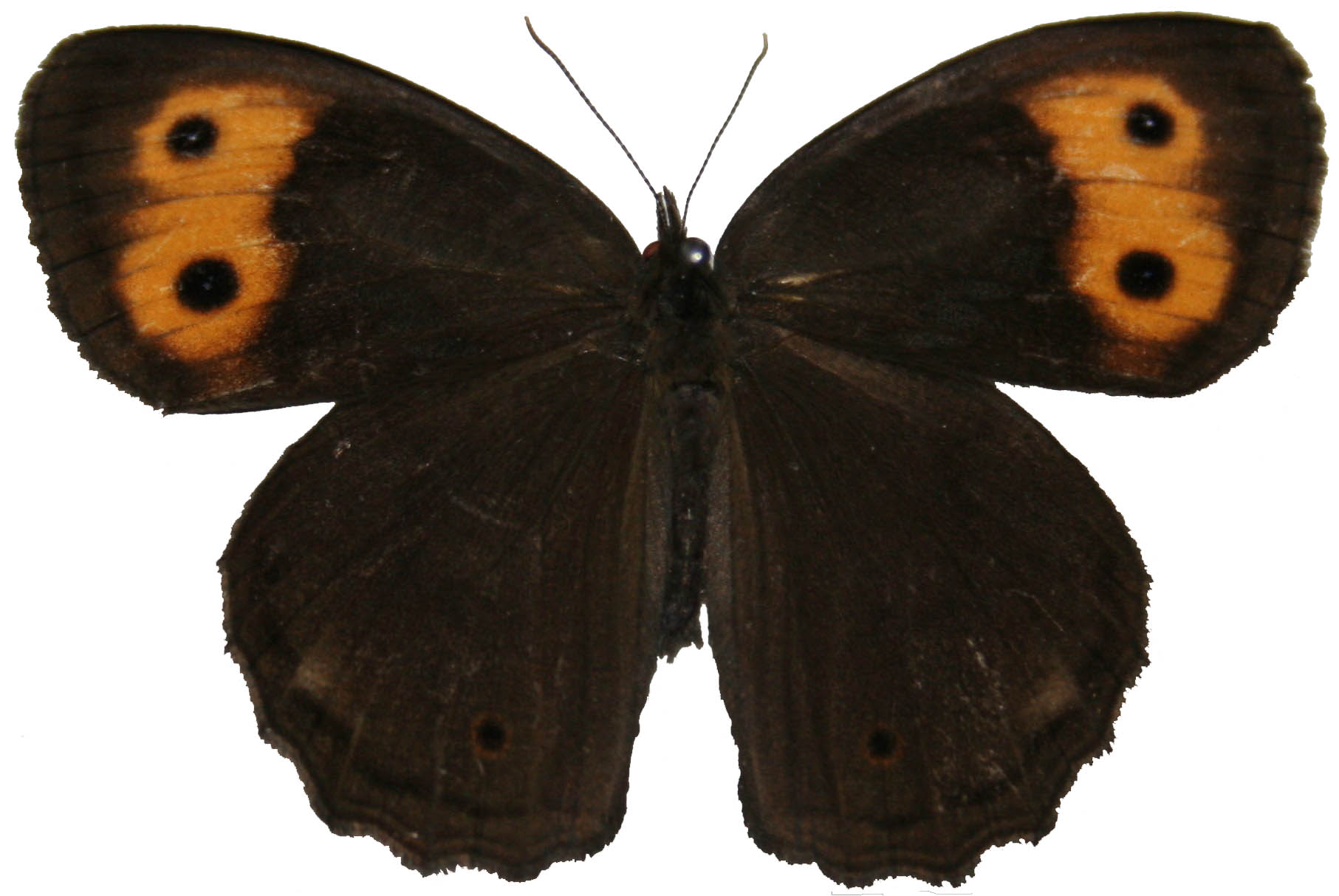
Common wood-nymph, Cercyonis pegala

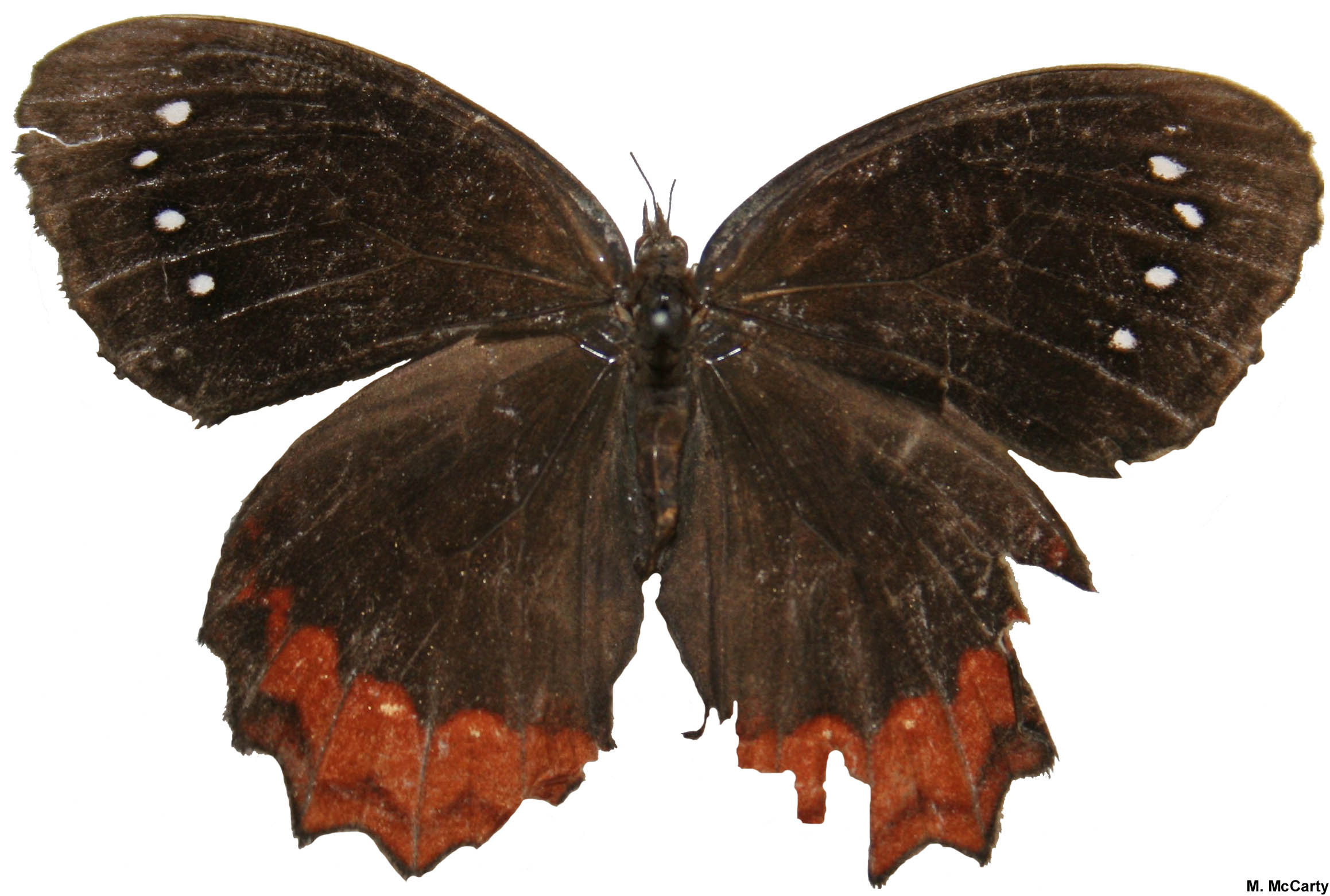
Red-bordered satyr, Gyrocheilus patrobas

- Southern pearly-eye, Enodia portlandia
- Northern pearly-eye, Enodia anthedon
- Creole pearly-eye, Enodia creola
- Eyed brown, Satyrodes eurydice
- Appalachian brown, Satyrodes appalachia
- Nabokov's satyr, Cyllopsis pyracmon
- Horsetail gemmed-satyr, Cyllopsis pseudopephredo
- Canyonland satyr, Cyllopsis pertepida
- Gemmed satyr, Cyllopsis gemma
- Carolina satyr, Hermeuptychia sosybius
- Hermeuptychia hermybius
- Hermeuptychia intricata
- Georgia satyr, Neonympha areolata
- Mitchell's satyr, Neonympha mitchellii
- Helicta satyr, Neonympha helicta
- Little wood-satyr, Megisto cymela
- Red satyr, Megisto rubricata
- Pine satyr, Paramacera allyni
- White satyr, Pareuptychia ocirrhoe
- Hayden's ringlet, Coenonympha haydenii
- Common ringlet, Coenonympha tullia
  - Inornate common ringlet, Coenonympha tullia inornata
  - Salt marsh common ringlet, Coenonympha tullia nipisiquit
  - Ochre common ringlet, Coenonympha tullia ochracea
  - California common ringlet, Coenonympha tullia california
- Common wood-nymph, Cercyonis pegala
- Mead's wood-nymph, Cercyonis meadii
- Great Basin wood-nymph, Cercyonis sthenele
- Small wood-nymph, Cercyonis oetus
- Vidler's alpine, Erebia vidleri
- Ross's alpine, Erebia rossii
- Disa alpine, Erebia disa
- Taiga alpine, Erebia mancinus
- Magdalena alpine, Erebia magdalena
- Banded alpine, Erebia fasciata
- Red-disked alpine, Erebia discoidalis
- Theano alpine, Erebia theano
- Four-dotted alpine, Erebia dabanensis (includes youngi)
- Common alpine, Erebia epipsodea
- Colorado alpine, Erebia callias
- Reddish alpine, Erebia kozhantshikovi (includes lafontainei)
- Eskimo alpine, Erebia occulta
- Red-bordered satyr, Gyrocheilus patrobas
- Riding's satyr, Neominois ridingsii
- Great Arctic, Oeneis nevadensis
- Macoun's Arctic, Oeneis macounii
- Chryxus Arctic, Oeneis chryxus
  - Brown chryxus Arctic, Oeneis chryxus chryxus
  - California chryxus Arctic, Oeneis chryxus ivallda
- Uhler's Arctic, Oeneis uhleri
- Alberta Arctic, Oeneis alberta
- White-veined Arctic, Oeneis taygete (distinct from Old World Oeneis bore)
- Jutta Arctic, Oeneis jutta
- Sentinel Arctic, Oeneis alpina (includes exubitor)
- Melissa Arctic, Oeneis melissa
- Polixenes Arctic, Oeneis polixenes
- Early Arctic, Oeneis rosovi (includes philipi)

== Subfamily Danainae: milkweed butterflies and clearwings ==
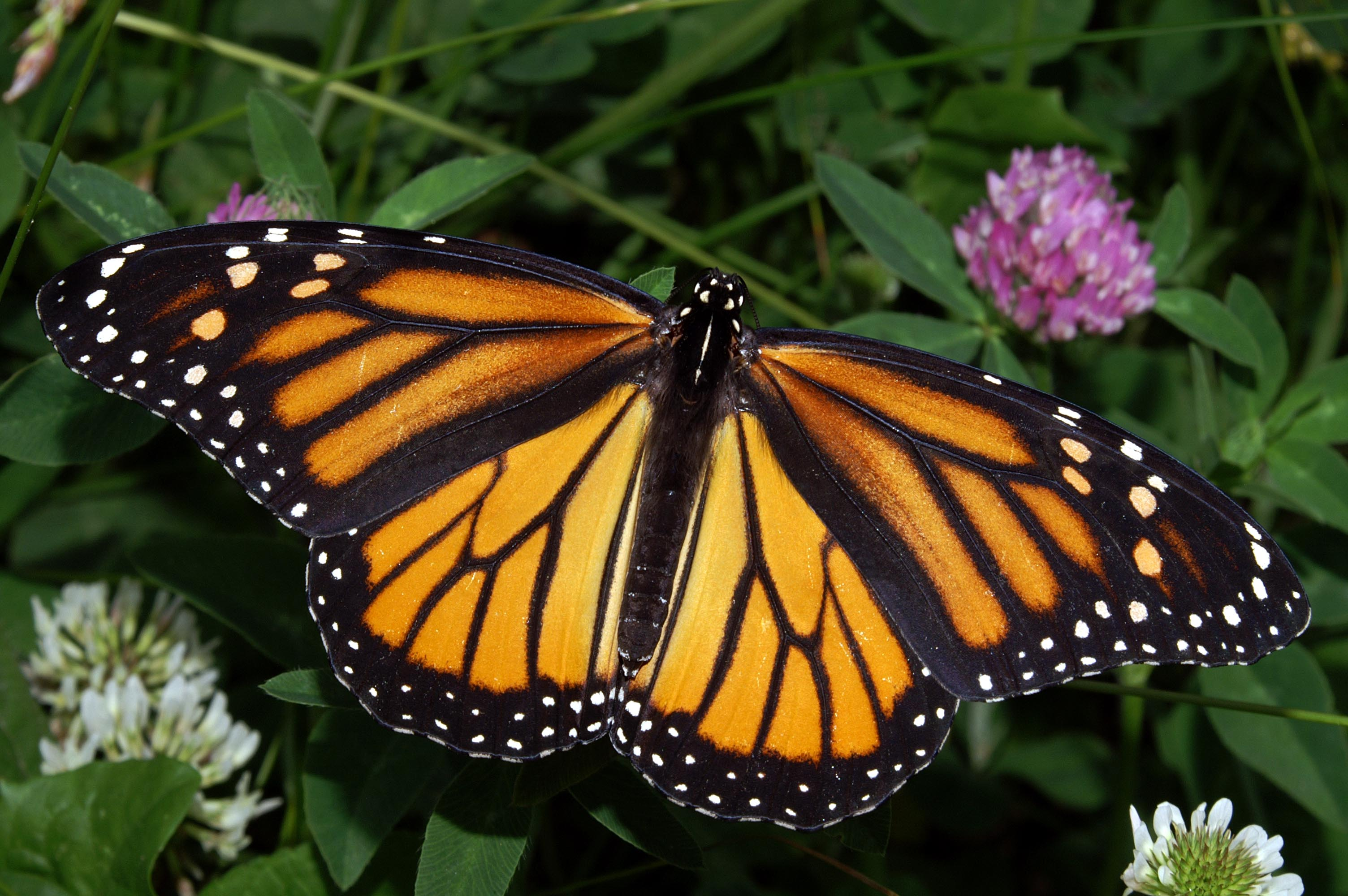
Monarch, Danaus plexippus

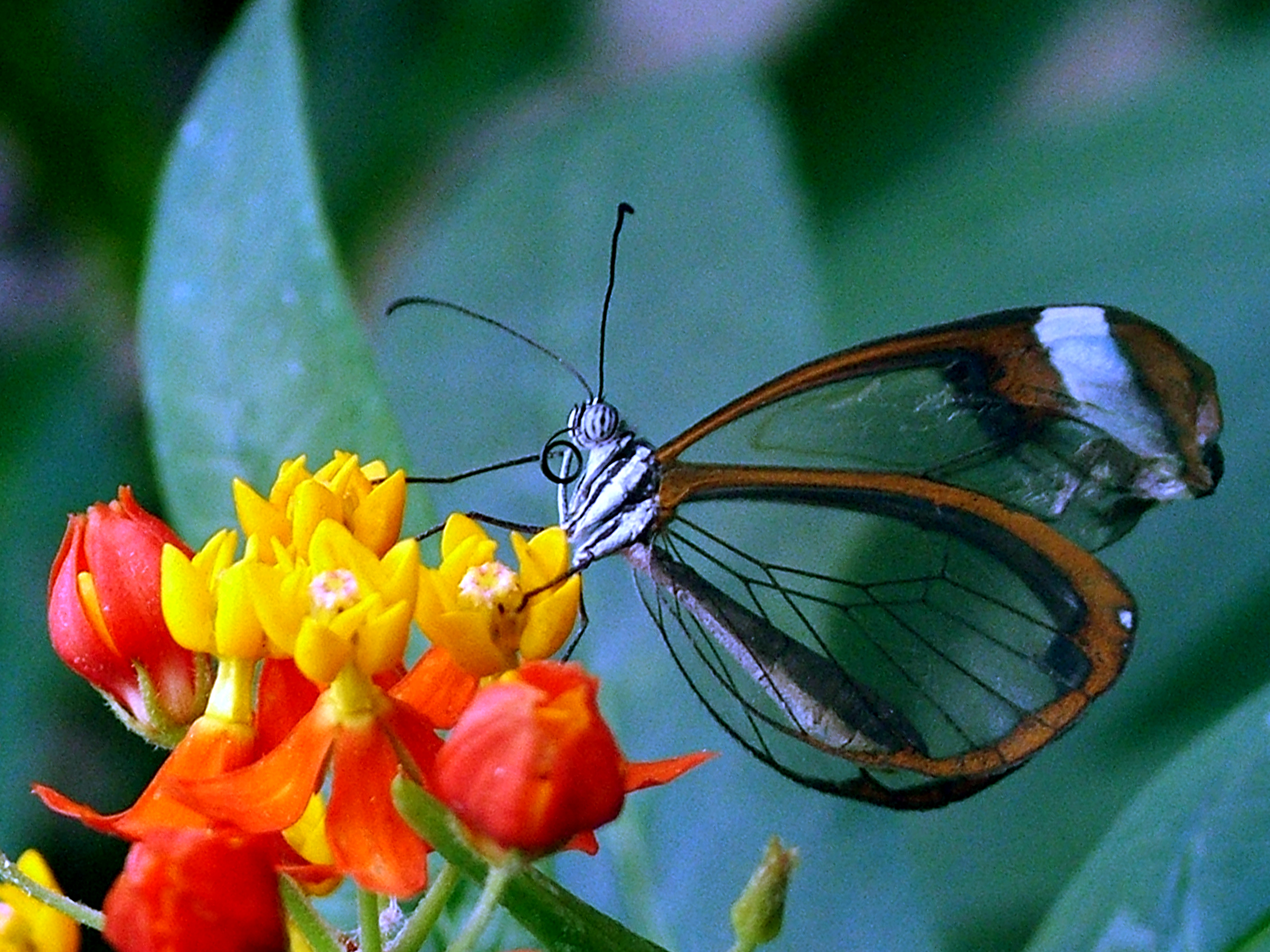
Thick-tipped Greta, Greta morgane

- Soldier, Danaus eresimus
- Queen, Danaus gilippus
- Monarch, Danaus plexippus
- Klug's clearwing, Dircenna klugii
- Thick-tipped Greta, Greta morgane
- Tiger mimic-queen, Lycorea cleobaea
- Disturbed tigerwing, Mechanitis polymnia
- Broad-tipped clearwing, Pteronymia cotytto
