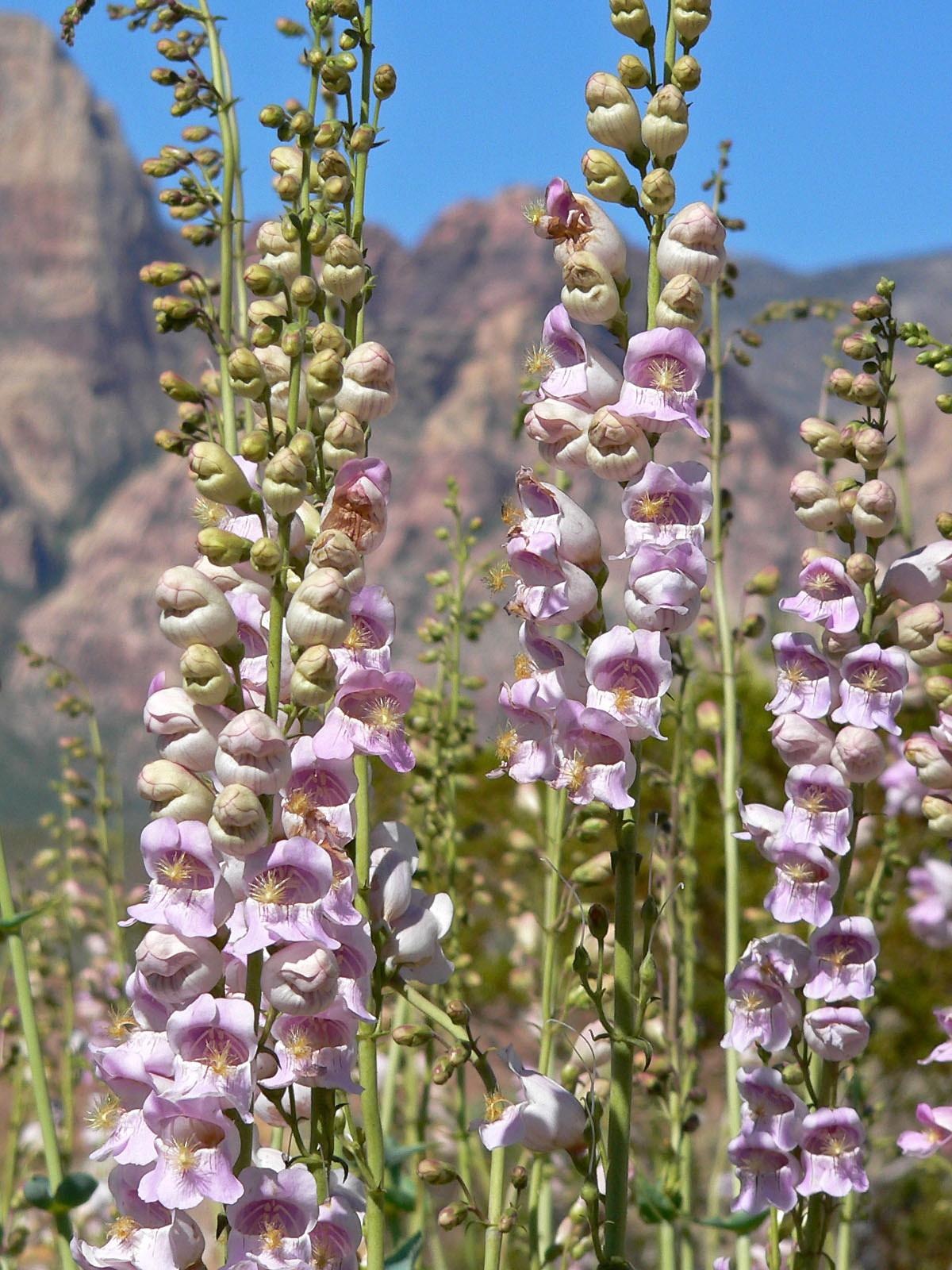

Conservation status
- Apparently Secure (NatureServe)

Scientific classification
- Kingdom: Plantae
- Clade: Tracheophytes
- Clade: Angiosperms
- Clade: Eudicots
- Clade: Asterids
- Order: Lamiales
- Family: Plantaginaceae
- Genus: Penstemon
- Species: P. palmeri

Binomial name
- Penstemon palmeri A.Gray

Varieties
- P. p. var. eglandulosus; P. p. var. macranthus; P. p. var. palmeri

Synonyms
- Penstemon macranthus

= Penstemon palmeri =

Plant species in the veronica family

Penstemon palmeri, known as scented penstemon or Palmer penstemon, is a perennial plant in the veronica family that grows widely in the western United States. It is notable for its showy, rounded flowers, and for being one of the few scented penstemons.

== Description ==
Scented penstemons have flowering stems that grow 43 to 140 centimeters (1.4–4.6 ft), but that may sometimes reach as much as 2 meters (6.6 ft). Each plant will have one to a few stems that are hairless and glaucous. They grow from a taproot topped with a large crown. The leaves are generally oppositely arranged and have toothed margins. The inflorescence is a panicle or raceme with small bracts.

The flower has a five-lobed calyx of sepals and a cylindrical corolla which may have an expanded throat. The staminode is partially hairy. The showy, rounded flower has large pink to violet to blue-purple petals and is fragrant, which distinguishes it from other, similar-looking penstemon. Occasional specimens are red, yellow, or white flowered.

== Taxonomy ==
In 1868 the botanist Asa Gray described a species which he named Penstemon palmeri. It is classified in the genus Penstemon as part of the Plantaginaceae family. It has one homotypic synonym, Penstemon palmeri subsp. typicus described by David D. Keck in 1937 that is not considered validly published.

=== Varieties ===
There are three Penstemon palmeri varieties.

==== Penstemon palmeri var. eglandulosus ====
In 1937 botanist David D. Keck described a subspecies of the species that he named eglandulosus. This taxa was reduced to a variety by Noel Herman Holmgren in 1979. According to Plants of the World Online it is native to Arizona, New Mexico, and Utah, however the population in Socorro County, New Mexico may be an introduction as it grows along a roadside. It grows in southern Utah and northern Arizona, on southern parts of the Colorado Plateau and the Kaibab Plateau.

==== Penstemon palmeri var. macranthus ====
This variety was first described as a species named Penstemon macranthus in 1905 by the botanist Alice Eastwood. It was also reduced to a variety by Holmgren in 1979. It is native to Nevada, there it grows in three counties, Pershing, Churchill, and Nye.

==== Penstemon palmeri var. palmeri ====
The autonymic variety is native to the southwestern US in California, Nevada, Utah, Arizona, and New Mexico. It is also present in Colorado, Wyoming, Idaho, and Washington states. Often this is due to seeding along roadsides after construction and even some of the populations in New Mexico are likely to have been introduced this way.

=== Names ===
The species name, palmeri, was bestowed upon the species to honor Edward Palmer, a botanist who traveled extensively collecting plants and studying ethnobotany. It is likewise known as Palmer's penstemon, Palmer penstemon, and Palmer beardtongue. It is also frequently known as scented penstemon or scented beardtongue, as it is one of the few penstemons with a noticeable scent. Other names include pink wild snapdragon and balloon flower.

== Distribution ==
Penstemon palmeri is native to desert mountains from the eastern Mojave Desert in California, to eastern Nevada, northeastern Arizona, and New Mexico, and north through areas in Utah, Colorado, Wyoming, Idaho, and eastern Washington.

Penstemon palmeri is a drought-tolerant perennial plant, preferring well draining drier soils. It grows in washes and bajadas, roadsides, canyon floors, creosote bush scrub, and juniper woodlands, from 1,100–2,300 metres (3,600–7,500 ft).

== Ecology ==
It is evergreen, and it is a larval host to both the Arachne checkerspot and the variable checkerspot. In a study conducted at Beaver Dam State Park in Nevada the bee Anthidium illustre was found to be a dominate pollinator and even acted aggressively towards hummingbirds attempting to visit the blooms. Though the mountain carpenter bee (Xylocopa tabaniformis androleuca) also managed to frequently visit the flowers and the Western carpenter bee (Xylocopa californica arizonensis) and the Morrison bumblebee (Bombus morrisoni) were also effective pollinators during their occasional visits.

== See also ==
List of Penstemon species
