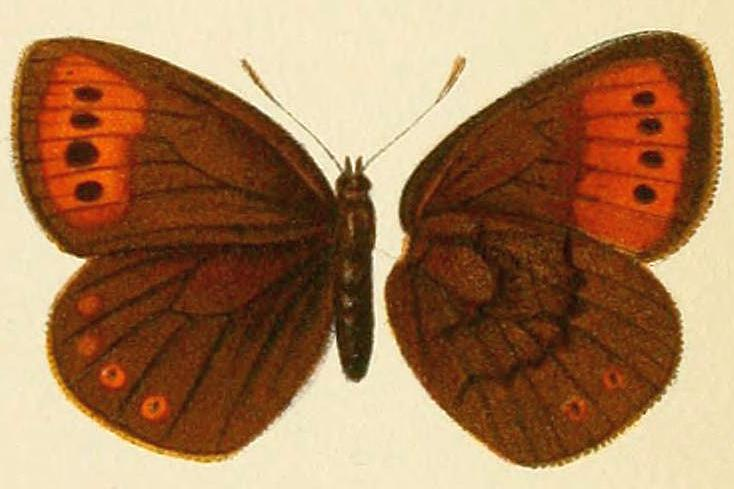

Scientific classification
- Domain: Eukaryota
- Kingdom: Animalia
- Phylum: Arthropoda
- Class: Insecta
- Order: Lepidoptera
- Family: Nymphalidae
- Genus: Erebia
- Species: E. fletcheri

Binomial name
- Erebia fletcheri Elwes, 1899

= Erebia fletcheri =

Species of butterfly

Erebia fletcheri is a butterfly found in the East Palearctic (Altai to Northeast Yakutia, Sayan, Transbaikalia. Amur) that belongs to the browns family. It resembles Erebia dabanensis but in fletcheri the reddish yellow borders of the ocelli of the forewing are merged on both sides to form a broad russet band. On the hindwing the small ocelli are widely separated from one another. The median band on the underside of the hindwing is dark and somewhat prominent in, while in fletcheri it is of the same dark brown colour as the rest of the wing, so that only the edges of this band are visible as two finely dentate black curved lines. It is found in July between Kurai and Bashkaus.

== See also ==
- List of butterflies of Russia
