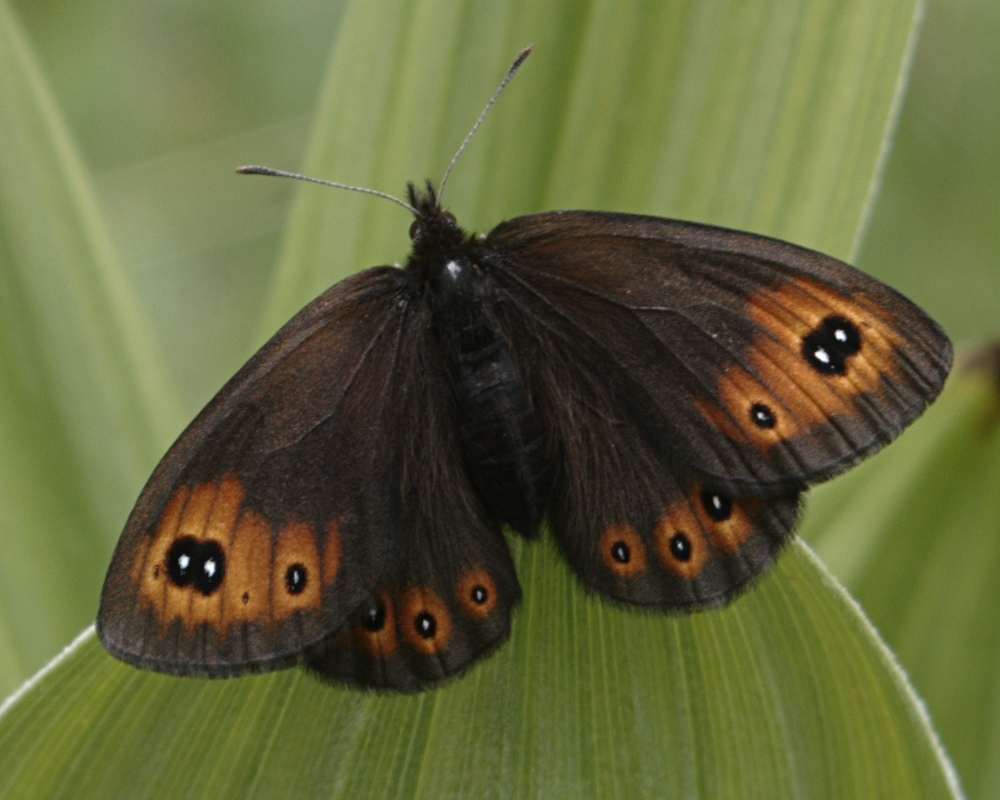

Scientific classification
- Kingdom: Animalia
- Phylum: Arthropoda
- Clade: Pancrustacea
- Class: Insecta
- Order: Lepidoptera
- Family: Nymphalidae
- Genus: Erebia
- Species: E. epipsodea

Binomial name
- Erebia epipsodea Butler, 1868

Subspecies
- Five, see text

Synonyms
- Erebia sineocellata Skinner, 1889; Erebia brucei Elwes, 1889

= Erebia epipsodea =

Common alpine

Species of butterfly

Erebia epipsodea, the common alpine, is a butterfly species of the subfamily Satyrinae of family Nymphalidae. It is found in North America from Alaska south through the Rocky Mountains to northern New Mexico and east across the prairie provinces to southwest Manitoba.

The wingspan is 34–45 mm (1.3–1.8 in). Adults are on wing from mid-June to early August.

The larvae feed on various grass species.

== Subspecies ==
Listed alphabetically:

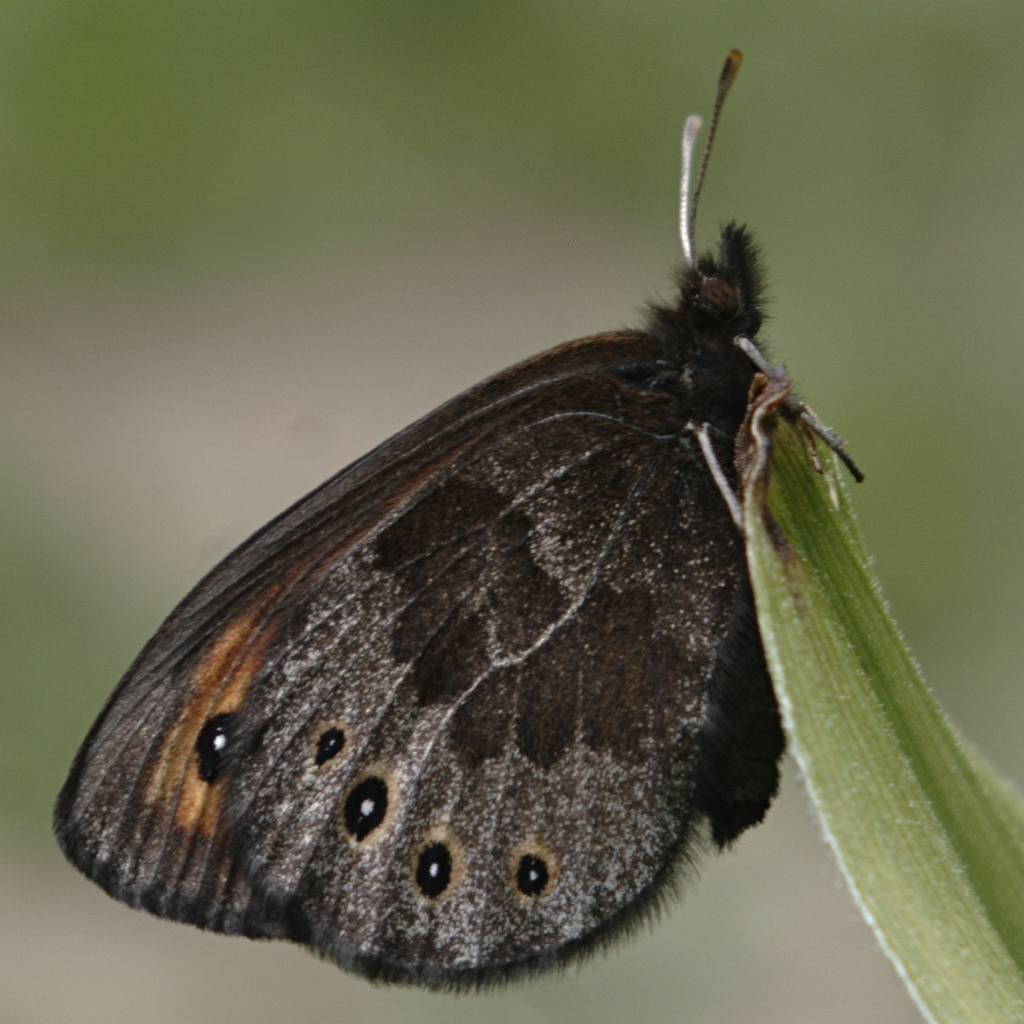

- E. e. epipsodea Butler, 1868 – eastern British Columbia and western Alberta
- E. e. freemani Ehrlich, 1954 – eastern Alberta to Manitoba
- E. e. hopfingeri Ehrlich, 1954
- E. e. remingtoni Ehrlich, 1952 – northern British Columbia and Yukon
- E. e. rhodia Edwards, 1871 – Colorado

== Similar species ==
- Vidler's alpine (E. vidleri)
