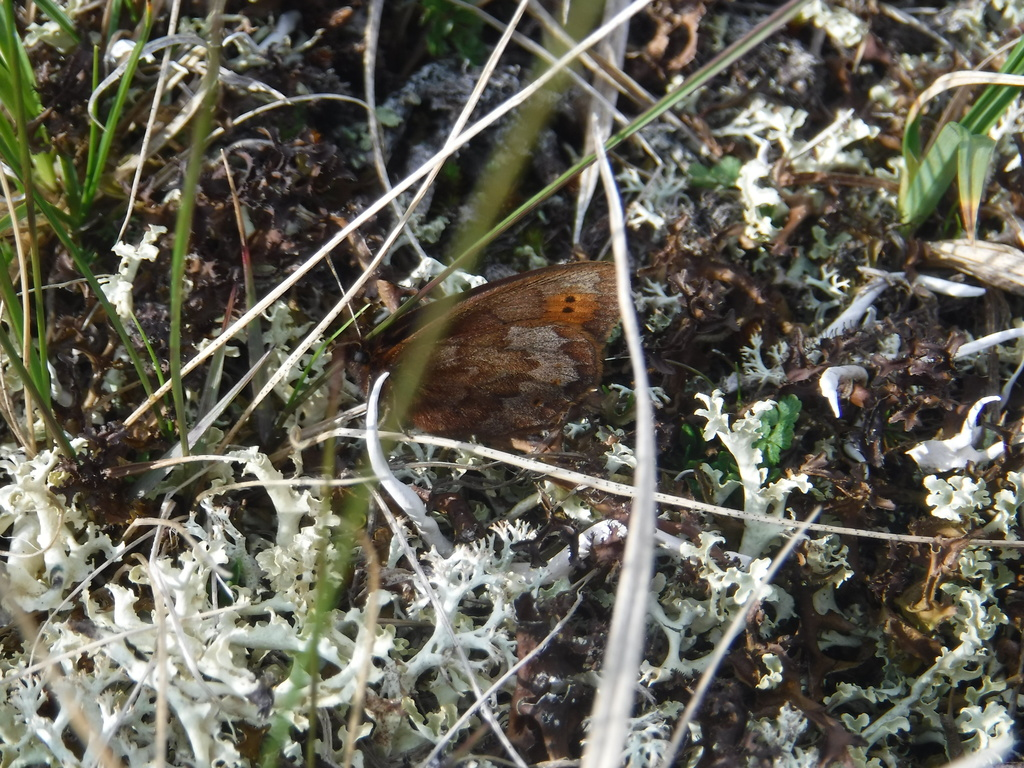

Scientific classification
- Kingdom: Animalia
- Phylum: Arthropoda
- Clade: Pancrustacea
- Class: Insecta
- Order: Lepidoptera
- Family: Nymphalidae
- Genus: Erebia
- Species: E. dabanensis

Binomial name
- Erebia dabanensis Erschoff, 1871

= Erebia dabanensis =

Species of butterfly

Erebia dabanensis is a small butterfly found in the East Palearctic that belongs to the browns family.

== Subspecies ==
- Erebia dabanensis dabanensis East Sayan, SouthTransbaikalia
- Erebia dabanensis olshvangi Gorbunov, 1995 Polar Urals
- Erebia dabanensis troubridgei Dubatolov, 1992 Yakutia, Chukot Peninsula
- Erebia dabanensis chingiza Churkin, 1999 NorthTransbaikalia
- Erebia dabanensis sokhondoensis Belik, 2001

== Description from Seitz ==
debanensis Ersch. (37 f). Upperside dark black-brown, on the forewing a straight submarginal row of 4 round small black spots bearing black dots; before the margin of the hindwing there are as a rule 3, but rarely 4, such red-brown spots, which are only very minutely or not at all dotted with black. The underside of the forewing grey-brown, with an obsolescent russet brown distal band, the ocelli of which have a somewhat lighter border. The apex and distal margin thinly dusted with white-grey. The underside of the hindwing is somewhat more densely scaled white-grey and has a but little darker dentate median band which is sharply defined in- and outwardly and bordered by a narrow whitish dentate line here and there on both sides. The ocelli which are situated in the somewhat lighter distal area are smaller than above, being sometimes altogether absent or replaced by small, hardly visible, black dots. Before the outer margin there is a submarginal band composed of small obsolescent brown spots. The female is lighter, more grey-brown, the ocelli of the hindwing are distinctly larger and on the underside of the hindwing of the same size as above. From East Siberia. — tundra Stgr. [now full species Erebia tundra Staudinger, 1888] is smaller, the distal band of the upperside somewhat obsolescent, beneath broader and proxinially and distally sharply defined. The underside of the hindwing scaled white-grey, with dark brown, distally dentate, median band and before the distal margin a slightly dentate dark transverse line. Likewise from East Siberia. — fletcheri Elw. [now full species Erebia fletcheri ] of which is known only the figure of the single sure female captured by Fletcher at 7500 ft. in the Altai Mts., is apparently nothing but a specimen of debanensis in which the reddish yellow borders of the ocelli of the forewing are merged on both sides to form a broad russet band. On the hindwing the small ocelli are widely separated from one another. The median band on the underside of the hindwing is dark and somewhat prominent in debanensis, while in fletcheri it is of the same dark brown colour as the rest of the wing, so that only the edges of this band are visible as two finely dentate black curved lines. Found in July between Kurai and Bashkaus.

== Biology ==
The larva feeds on Festuca.

== See also ==
- List of butterflies of Europe
