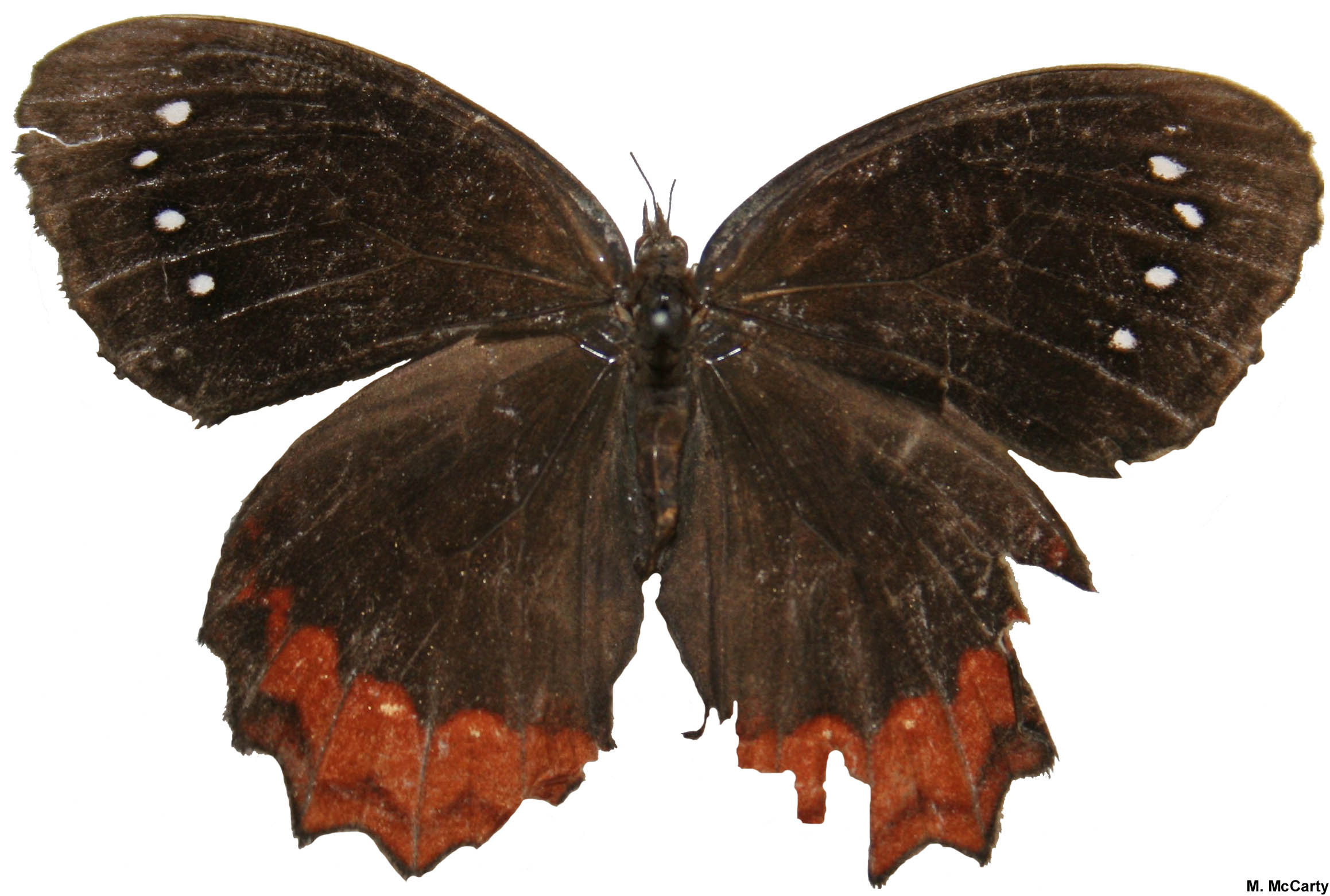
- Gyrocheilus patrobas

Scientific classification
- Kingdom: Animalia
- Phylum: Arthropoda
- Class: Insecta
- Order: Lepidoptera
- Family: Nymphalidae
- Subtribe: Pronophilina
- Genus: Gyrocheilus; Butler, 1867
- Species: G. patrobas

Binomial name
- Gyrocheilus patrobas (Hewitson, 1862)

Synonyms
- Pronophila patrobas Hewitson, 1862; Gyrocheilus tritonia Edwards, 1874

= Gyrocheilus =

Monotypic brush-footed butterfly genus

Gyrocheilus is a monotypic genus in the nymphalid subfamily Satyrinae. The single contained species is Gyrocheilus patrobas, the red-bordered brown, which is found in North America in central and southern Arizona and Mexico. The habitat consists of streamsides in open coniferous forests in the mountainous areas.

The wingspan is 51–60 mm. There is one generation per year with adults on wing from mid-August to October.

The larvae feed on Muhlenbergia emersleyi.

== Subspecies ==
- Gyrocheilus patrobas patrobas (Mexico)
- Gyrocheilus patrobas tritonia Edwards, 1874 (Arizona)
