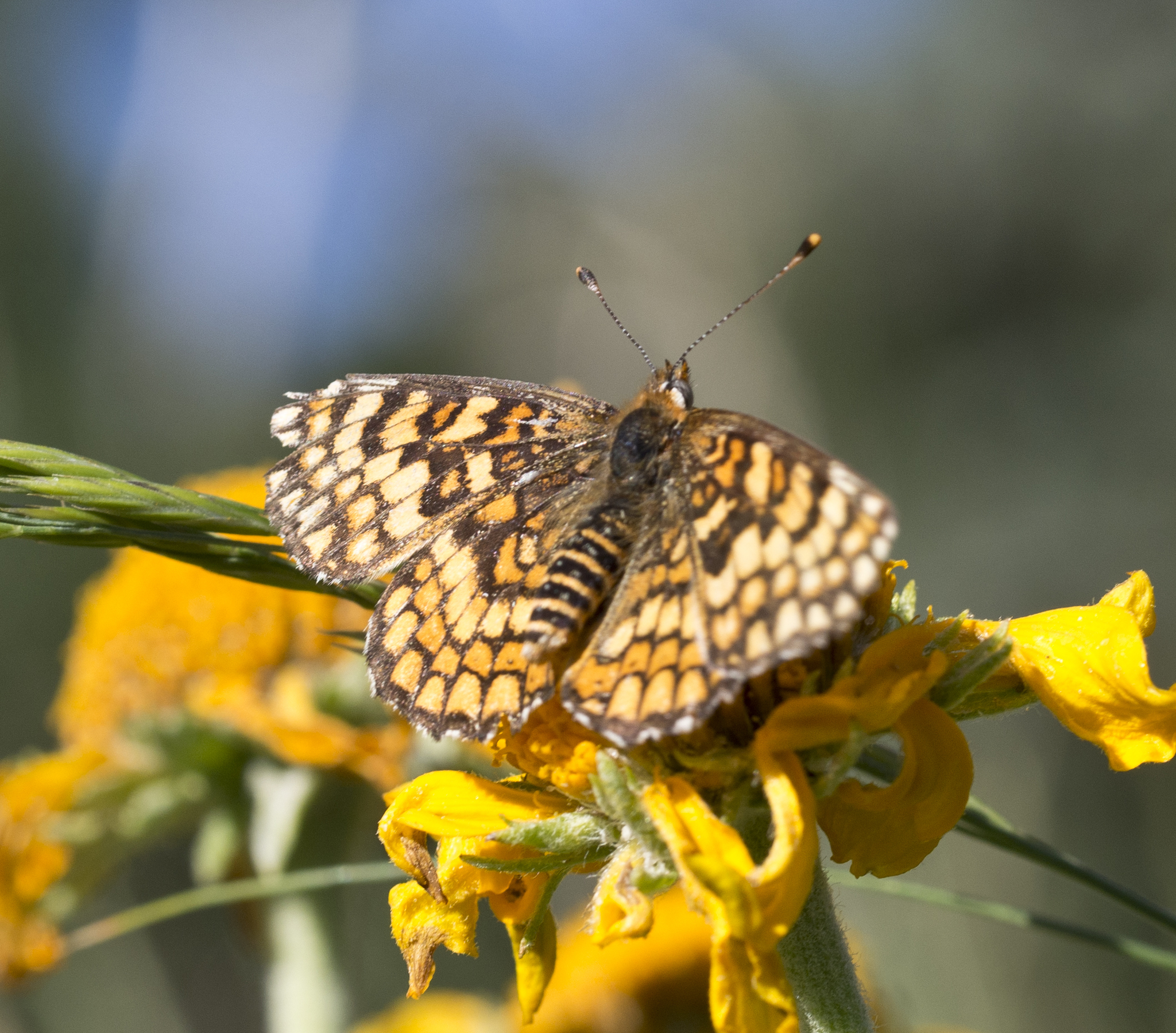

Scientific classification
- Kingdom: Animalia
- Phylum: Arthropoda
- Clade: Pancrustacea
- Class: Insecta
- Order: Lepidoptera
- Family: Nymphalidae
- Tribe: Melitaeini
- Genus: Poladryas
- Species: P. arachne

Binomial name
- Poladryas arachne (W. H. Edwards, 1869)

= Arachne checkerspot =

Species of butterfly

Poladryas arachne, the arachne checkerspot, is a species of crescents, checkerspots, anglewings, etc. in the butterfly family Nymphalidae.

== Subspecies ==
These five subspecies belong to the species Poladryas arachne:

- Poladryas arachne arachne (W. H. Edwards, 1869)
- Poladryas arachne expedita Austin in T. Emmel, 1998
- Poladryas arachne gilensis (W. Holland, 1930)
- Poladryas arachne monache (J. A. Comstock, 1918)
- Poladryas arachne nympha (W. H. Edwards, 1884)
