= Boloria montinus =

Scientific classification
- Kingdom: Animalia
- Phylum: Arthropoda
- Clade: Pancrustacea
- Class: Insecta
- Order: Lepidoptera
- Family: Nymphalidae
- Genus: Boloria
- Species: B. montinus

Binomial name
- Boloria montinus Scudder, 1863

Species of butterfly

Boloria montinus, the purplish fritillary, is a small butterfly species of fritillary, belonging to the brush-footed butterfly family, Nymphalidae. It is from North America and is adapted to cold weather. Boloria chariclea montinus is a subspecies of Boloria montinus, isolated in the White Mountains of New Hampshire, locally called the white mountain fratillary. These names are often applied to the same biological entity.

== Physical characteristics ==
Boloria montinus has a small-to-medium wingspan of roughly 1.2 to 1.5 inches. It is orange with black markings on its upper wings. Fresh specimens have a characteristic purplish sheen on the underside of the hindwings, accompanied by thin white marginal spots.

== Habitat ==
Boloria montinus butterflies are found in cold northern regions, the Holarctic, and isolated high-elevation or boggy microclimates in North America, including parts of New England, such as the White Mountains of New Hampshire, northern tier states like Wisconsin and Minnesota, and parts of Canada.

== Diet ==
Purplish fritillary caterpillars feed primarily on violets, alongside scrub willows in certain regions. The adult butterflies feed on nectar from flowers like goldenrods and asters.

Boloria montinus butterflies typically have one annual brood flying from late June through August, depending on the specific latitude and local climate.
