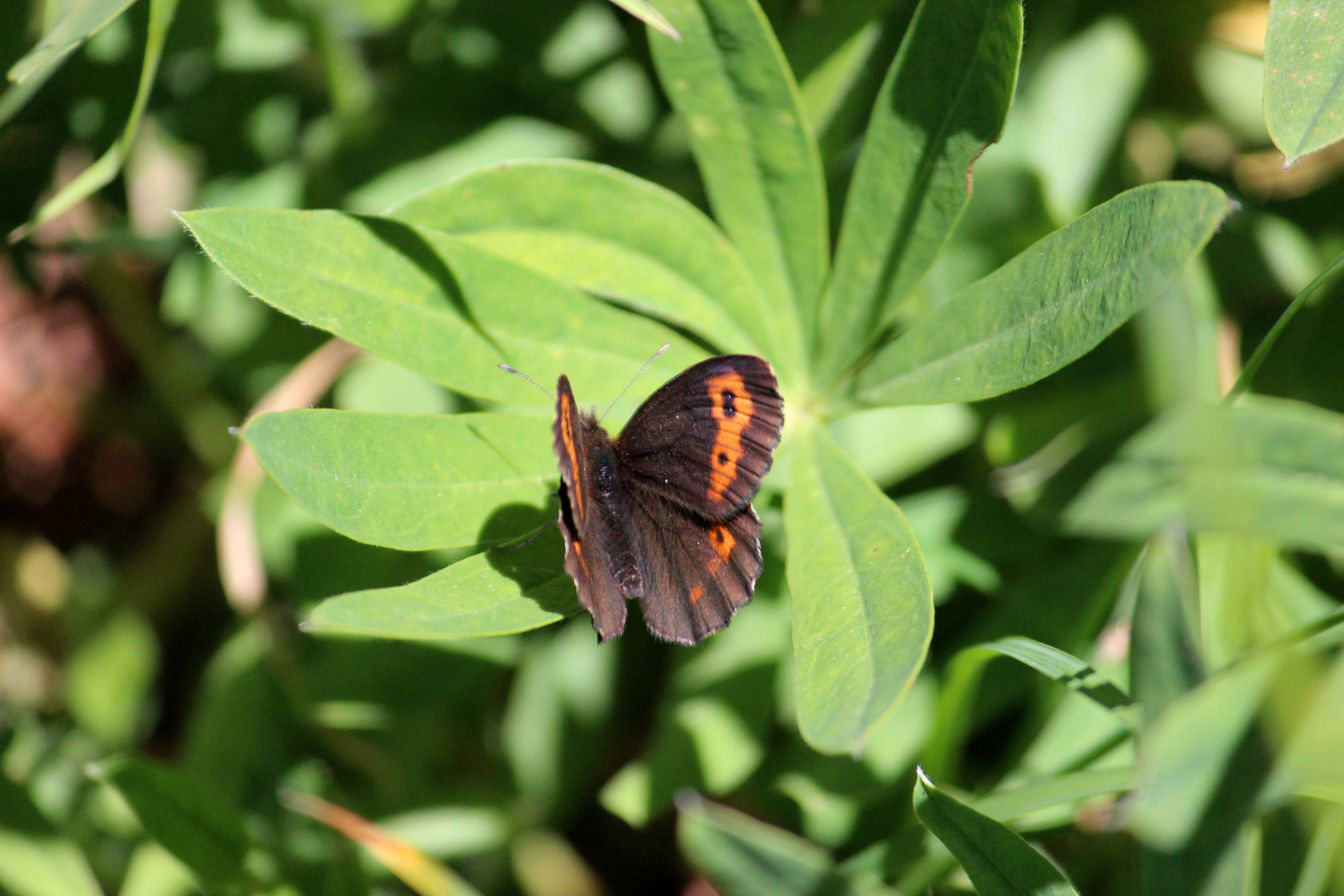

Scientific classification
- Kingdom: Animalia
- Phylum: Arthropoda
- Clade: Pancrustacea
- Class: Insecta
- Order: Lepidoptera
- Family: Nymphalidae
- Genus: Erebia
- Species: E. vidleri

Binomial name
- Erebia vidleri Elwes, 1898

= Erebia vidleri =

Vidler's alpine

Species of butterfly

Erebia vidleri, the northwest alpine or Vidler's alpine, is butterfly belonging to the subfamily Satyrinae of the family Nymphalidae. It is found in western North America.

== Description ==
The wingspan is 34–45 mm (1.3–1.8 in). The dorsal wings are brownish black, with a jagged orange band on both wings surrounding three black eyespots on the forewings and two or three on the hindwings. The ventral side of the forewing is similar to the dorsal side. The ventral side of the hindwing is grey with eyespots are that are vague or absent.

== Distribution and habitat ==
The mountainous regions of Washington state and British Columbia as far north as Mt. Hoadley. Its habitats include moist, flowery alpine and subalpine meadows and slopes.

== Life cycle ==
The food plants of the larvae are various species of Poaceae.
