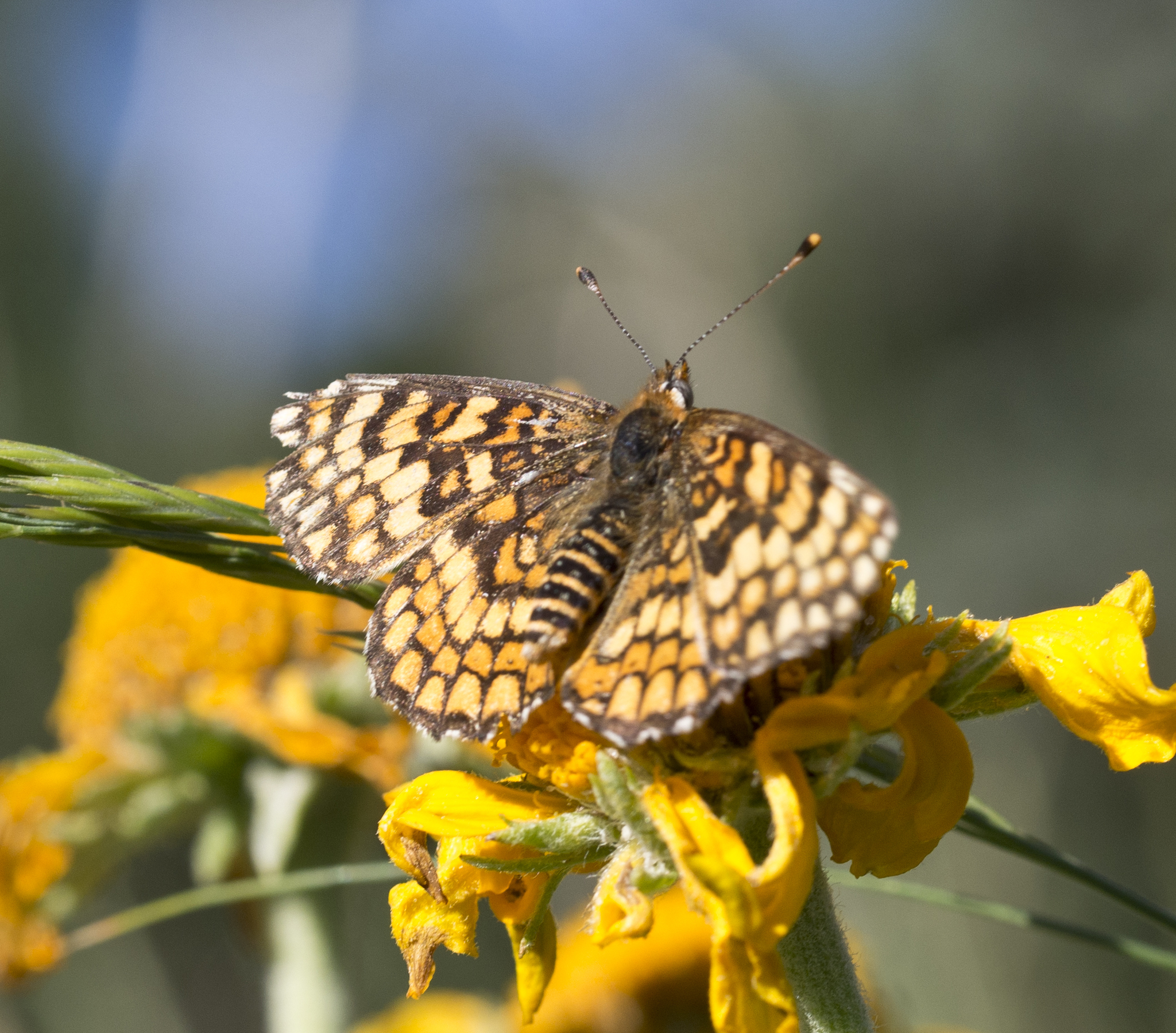
- P. m. arachne

Scientific classification
- Domain: Eukaryota
- Kingdom: Animalia
- Phylum: Arthropoda
- Class: Insecta
- Order: Lepidoptera
- Family: Nymphalidae
- Genus: Poladryas; Bauer, 1975
- Species: P. minuta

Binomial name
- Poladryas minuta (W.H. Edwards, 1861)

Synonyms
- Melitaea minuta W.H. Edwards, 1861; Melitaea approximata Strecker, 1900; Melitaea arachne W.H. Edwards, 1869; Melitaea minuta ab. gunderiae Holland, 1930; Melitaea nympha W.H. Edwards, 1884; Melitaea arachne ab. skinneri Oberthür, 1923; Melitaea pola var. arachne ab. polingi Gunder, 1926; Melitaea monache Comstock, 1918; Melitaaea gilensis Holland, 1930

= Poladryas =

Dotted checkerspot

Genus of butterflies

Poladryas is a monotypic genus of butterflies from United States and Central America in the family Nymphalidae. The single species it contains is Poladryas minuta, the dotted checkerspot.

== Subspecies ==
- P. m. arachne (W.H. Edwards, 1869) – Arachne checkerspot (Colorado)
- P. m. gilensis (Holland, 1930) (Arizona)
- P. m. minuta (Texas)
- P. m. monache (Comstock, 1918)
- P. m. nympha (W.H. Edwards, 1884) (Arizona, New Mexico)
