= List of butterflies of Oregon =

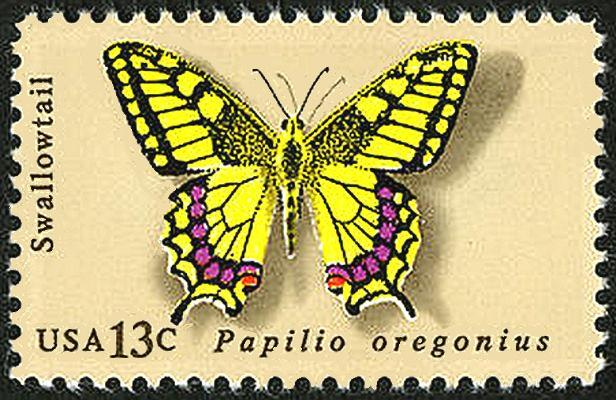
U.S. postage stamp featuring the Oregon swallowtail butterfly, Papilio machaon oregonius.

This is a list of butterflies found in the U.S. state of Oregon.

== Hesperiidae, skippers ==
- Epargyreus clarus, silver-spotted skipper
- Thorybes pylades, northern cloudywing
- Thorybes diversus, western cloudywing
- Thorybes mexicana, Mexican cloudywing
- Erynnis icelus, dreamy duskywing
- Erynnis propertius, Propertius duskywing
- Erynnis pacuvius, Pacuvius duskywing
- Erynnis afranius, Afranius duskywing
- Erynnis persius, Persius duskywing
- Pyrgus ruralis, two-banded checkered-skipper
- Pyrgus communis, common checkered-skipper
- Heliopetes ericetorum, northern white-skipper
- Pholisora catullus, common sootywing
- Hesperopsis libya, Mohave sootywing
- Carterocephalus palaemon, arctic skipper
- Oarisma garita, garita skipperling
- Hesperia uncas, Uncas skipper
- Hesperia juba, Juba skipper
- Hesperia colorado, western branded skipper
- Hesperia columbia, Columbian skipper
- Hesperia lindseyi, Lindsey's skipper
- Hesperia nevada, Nevada skipper
- Atalopedes campestris, sachem
- Polites peckius, Peck's skipper
- Polites sabuleti, sandhill skipper
- Polites mardon, Mardon skipper
- Polites themistocles, tawny-edged skipper
- Polites mystic, long dash
- Polites sonora, Sonora skipper
- Ochlodes sylvanoides, woodland skipper
- Ochlodes agricola, rural skipper
- Ochlodes yuma, Yuma skipper
- Euphyes vestris, dun skipper
- Amblyscirtes vialis, common roadside-skipper

== Papilionidae, parnassians and swallowtails ==
- Parnassius clodius, Clodius parnassian
- Parnassius smintheus, Rocky Mountain parnassian
- Battus philenor, pipevine swallowtail
- Papilio machaon, Old World swallowtail
  - Papilio machaon oregonius, Oregon swallowtail
- Papilio zelicaon, anise swallowtail
- Papilio indra, Indra swallowtail
- Papilio rutulus, western tiger swallowtail
- Papilio eurymedon, pale swallowtail
- Papilio multicaudata, two-tailed swallowtail

== Pieridae, whites and sulphurs ==
- Anthocharis sara, Pacific orangetip
- Anthocharis stella, Stella orangetip
- Anthocharis lanceolata, gray marble
- Euchloe ausonides, large marble
- Euchloe lotta, desert marble
- Euchloe hyantis, California marble
- Neophasia menapia, pine white
- Pieris marginalis, margined white
- Pieris rapae, cabbage white
- Pontia beckerii, Becker's white
- Pontia protodice, checkered white
- Pontia occidentalis, western white
- Pontia sisymbrii, spring white
- Colias philodice, clouded sulphur
- Colias eurytheme, orange sulphur
- Colias occidentalis, western sulphur
- Colias alexandra, Queen Alexandra's sulphur
- Colias pelidne, pelidne sulphur
- Colias interior, pink-edged sulphur
- Phoebis sennae, cloudless sulphur
- Pyrisitia proterpia, tailed orange

== Lycaenidae, gossamer-wing butterflies ==
- Lycaena arota, tailed copper
- Lycaena phlaeas, American copper
- Lycaena cupreus, lustrous copper
- Lycaena xanthoides, great copper
- Lycaena editha, Edith's copper
- Lycaena gorgon, gorgon copper
- Lycaena rubidus, ruddy copper
- Lycaena heteronea, blue copper
- Lycaena helloides, purplish copper
- Lycaena nivalis, lilac-bordered copper
- Lycaena mariposa, mariposa copper
- Euphilotes columbiae, Columbian blue
- Habrodais grunus, golden hairstreak
- Atlides halesus, great purple hairstreak
- Callophrys affinis, western green hairstreak
- Callophrys sheridanii, Sheridan's green hairstreak
- Callophrys nelsoni, Nelson's hairstreak
- Callophrys gryneus, juniper hairstreak
- Callophrys spinetorum, thicket hairstreak
- Callophrys johnsoni, Johnson's hairstreak
- Callophrys augustinus, brown elfin
- Callophrys mossii, Moss' elfin
- Callophrys polios, hoary elfin
- Callophrys eryphon, western pine elfin
- Satyrium titus, coral hairstreak
- Satyrium californica, California hairstreak
- Satyrium sylvinum, sylvan hairstreak
- Satyrium auretorum, gold-hunter's hairstreak
- Satyrium tetra, mountain mahogany hairstreak
- Satyrium saepium, hedgerow hairstreak
- Satyrium behrii, Behr's hairstreak
- Satyrium fuliginosum, sooty hairstreak
- Satyrium semiluna, sagebrush sooty hairstreak
- Strymon melinus, gray hairstreak
- Leptotes marina, marine blue
- Brephidium exilis, western pygmy-blue
- Cupido comyntas, eastern tailed-blue
- Cupido amyntula, western tailed-blue
- Celastrina ladon, spring azure
- Celastrina echo, echo azure
- Glaucopsyche piasus, arrowhead blue
- Glaucopsyche lygdamus, silvery blue
- Philotiella leona, pumice dotted-blue
- Euphilotes battoides, western square-dotted blue
- Euphilotes intermedia, intermediate dotted-blue
- Euphilotes enoptes, Pacific dotted-blue
- Euphilotes ancilla, Rocky Mountain dotted-blue
- Plebejus idas, northern blue
- Plebejus anna, Anna's blue
- Plebejus melissa, Melissa blue (includes Karner blue)
- Icaricia saepiolus, greenish blue
- Icaricia icarioides, Boisduval's blue
- Icaricia shasta, Shasta blue
- Icaricia acmon, Acmon blue
- Icaricia lupini, lupine blue
- Agriades podarce, Sierra Nevada blue

== Riodinidae, metalmarks ==
- Apodemia mormo, Mormon metalmark

== Nymphalidae, brush-footed butterflies ==
- Danaus plexippus, monarch
- Danaus gilippus, queen
- Euptoieta claudia, variegated fritillary
- Speyeria cybele, great spangled fritillary
- Speyeria coronis, Coronis fritillary
- Speyeria zerene, zerene fritillary
- Speyeria callippe, callippe fritillary
- Speyeria egleis, Great Basin fritillary
- Speyeria hesperis, northwestern fritillary
- Speyeria hydaspe, Hydaspe fritillary
- Speyeria mormonia, Mormon fritillary
- Boloria selene, silver-bordered fritillary
- Boloria bellona, meadow fritillary
- Boloria epithore, pacific fritillary
- Limenitis archippus, viceroy
- Limenitis lorquini, Lorquin's admiral
- Limenitis weidemeyerii, Weidemeyer's admiral
- Adelpha californica, California sister
- Chlosyne leanira, leanira checkerspot
- Chlosyne hoffmanni, Hoffmann's checkerspot
- Chlosyne acastus, sagebrush checkerspot
- Chlosyne palla, northern checkerspot
- Phyciodes orseis, California crescent
- Phyciodes pallida, pale crescent
- Phyciodes mylitta, Mylitta crescent
- Phyciodes cocyta, northern crescent
- Phyciodes pulchella, field crescent
- Euphydryas gillettii, Gillette's checkerspot
- Euphydryas editha, Edith's checkerspot
- Euphydryas chalcedona, Chalcedon checkerspot
- Euphydryas anicia, Anicia checkerspot
- Euphydryas colon, colon checkerspot
- Junonia coenia, common buckeye
- Polygonia satyrus, satyr comma
- Polygonia faunus, green comma
- Polygonia gracilis, hoary comma
- Polygonia zephyrus, zephyr comma
- Polygonia progne, gray comma
- Polygonia oreas, oreas comma
- Aglais io, European peacock
- Aglais milberti, Milbert's tortoiseshell
- Nymphalis vaualbum, Compton tortoiseshell
- Nymphalis antiopa, mourning cloak
- Nymphalis californica, California tortoiseshell
- Vanessa atalanta, red admiral
- Vanessa cardui, painted lady
- Vanessa annabella, West Coast lady
- Vanessa virginiensis, American lady
- Coenonympha tullia, common ringlet
- Erebia epipsodea, common alpine
- Neominois ridingsii, Ridings' satyr
- Oeneis nevadensis, great arctic
- Cercyonis pegala, common wood-nymph
- Cercyonis sthenele, Great Basin wood-nymph
- Cercyonis oetus, small wood-nymph
