= Wood nymph =

Wood nymph is another term for a dryad in Ancient Greek mythology.

The term has also been applied to various animals:

- Woodnymphs (Thalurania, a hummingbird genus from tropical America)
- Cercyonis (North American wood-nymphs, a brush-footed butterfly genus)
  - in particular the common wood-nymph (C. pegala)
- Ideopsis (Southeast Asian tree- and wood-nymphs, also known as glassy tigers, a brush-footed butterfly genus not closely related to Cercyonis)
  - in particular Ideopsis juventa

Other

- The Wood Nymph, 1894 tone poem by Jean Sibelius
- The Wood Nymph (film), 1916 lost film by D. W. Griffith (as Granville Warwick)
- Hulder or Skogsrå, mythical women that live in forests according to Scandinavian folklore
- Slavic water spirits
