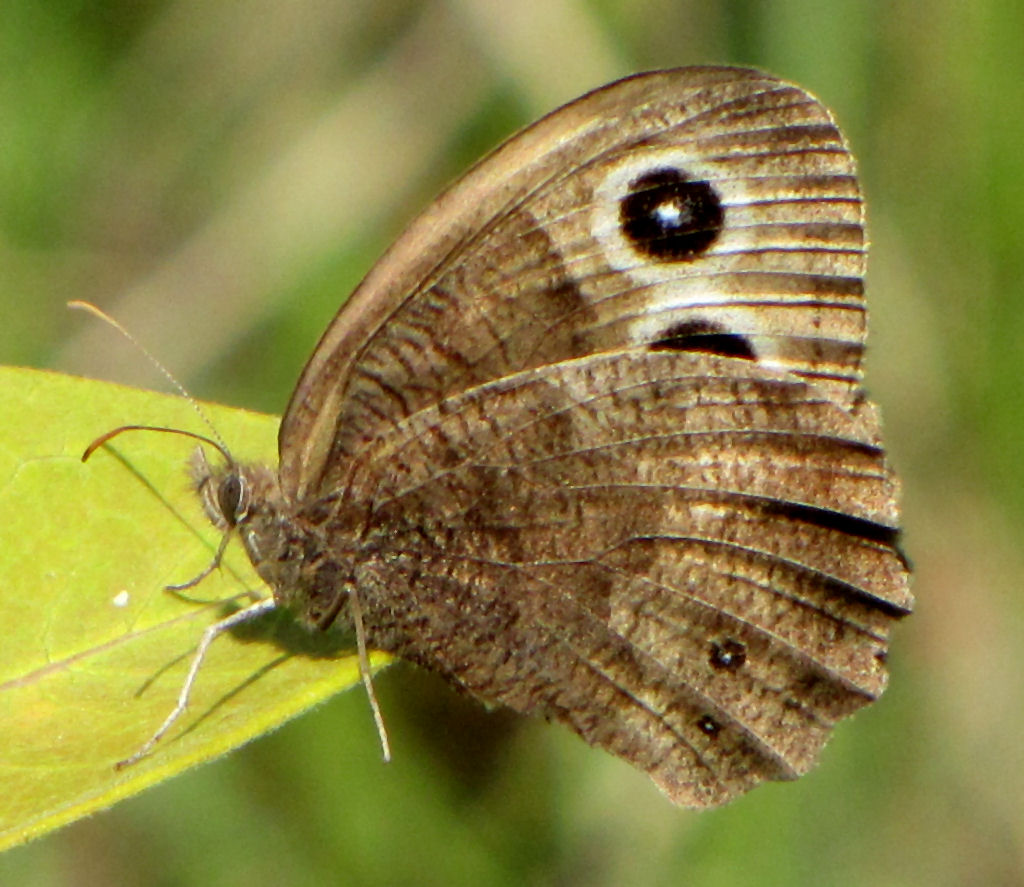

Conservation status
- Least Concern (IUCN 3.1)

Scientific classification
- Kingdom: Animalia
- Phylum: Arthropoda
- Class: Insecta
- Order: Lepidoptera
- Family: Nymphalidae
- Genus: Cercyonis
- Species: C. pegala

Binomial name
- Cercyonis pegala (Fabricius, 1775)
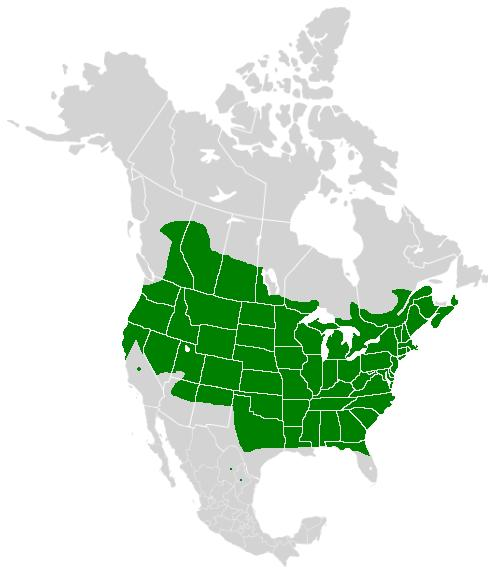

= Common wood-nymph =

Species of butterfly

The common wood-nymph (Cercyonis pegala) is a North American species of butterfly in the family Nymphalidae. It is also known as the wood-nymph, grayling, blue-eyed grayling, and the goggle eye.

== Taxonomy ==
The following subspecies are recognized:

- Cercyonis pegala abbotti (Brown, 1969)
- Cercyonis pegala alope (Fabricius, 1793) – Texas
- Cercyonis pegala ariane (Boisduval, 1852) – Oregon, Utah
- Cercyonis pegala blanca (Emmel & Mattoon, 1972)
- Cercyonis pegala boopis (Behr, 1864) – British Columbia
- Cercyonis pegala damei (Barnes & Benjamin, 1926)
- Cercyonis pegala ino (Hall, 1924) – prairies
- Cercyonis pegala nephele (Kirby, 1837) – northern Canada and US
- Cercyonis pegala olympus (Edwards, 1880)
- Cercyonis pegala pegala (Fabricius, 1775) - eastern US
- Cercyonis pegala stephensi (Wright, 1905)
- Cercyonis pegala texana (Edwards, 1880) – Texas
- Cercyonis pegala wheeleri (Edwards, 1873)

== Description ==
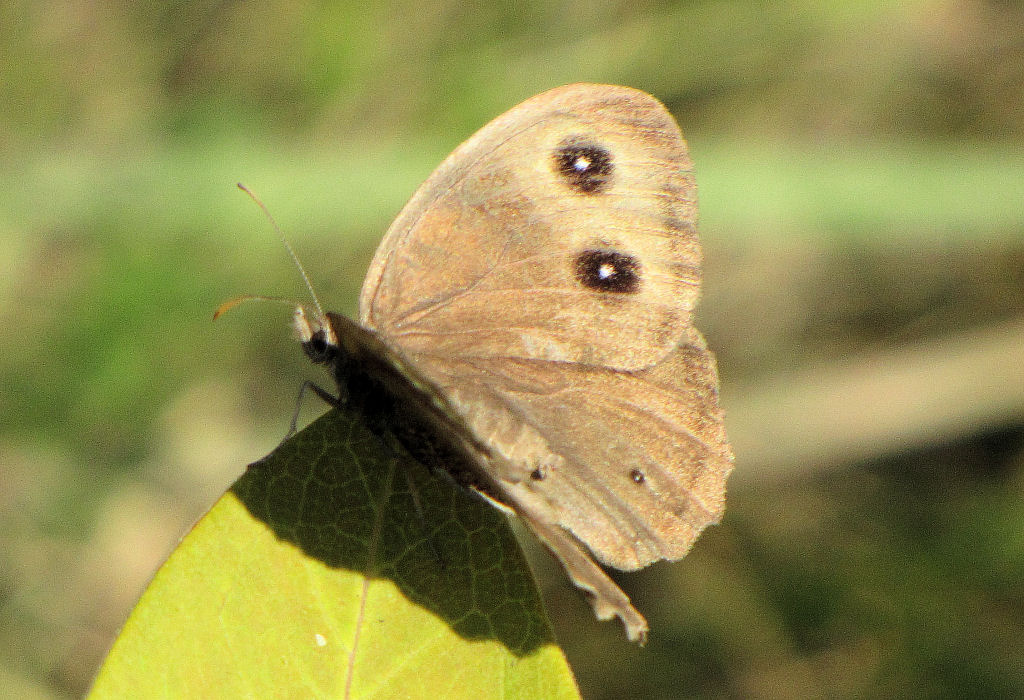
Dorsal view

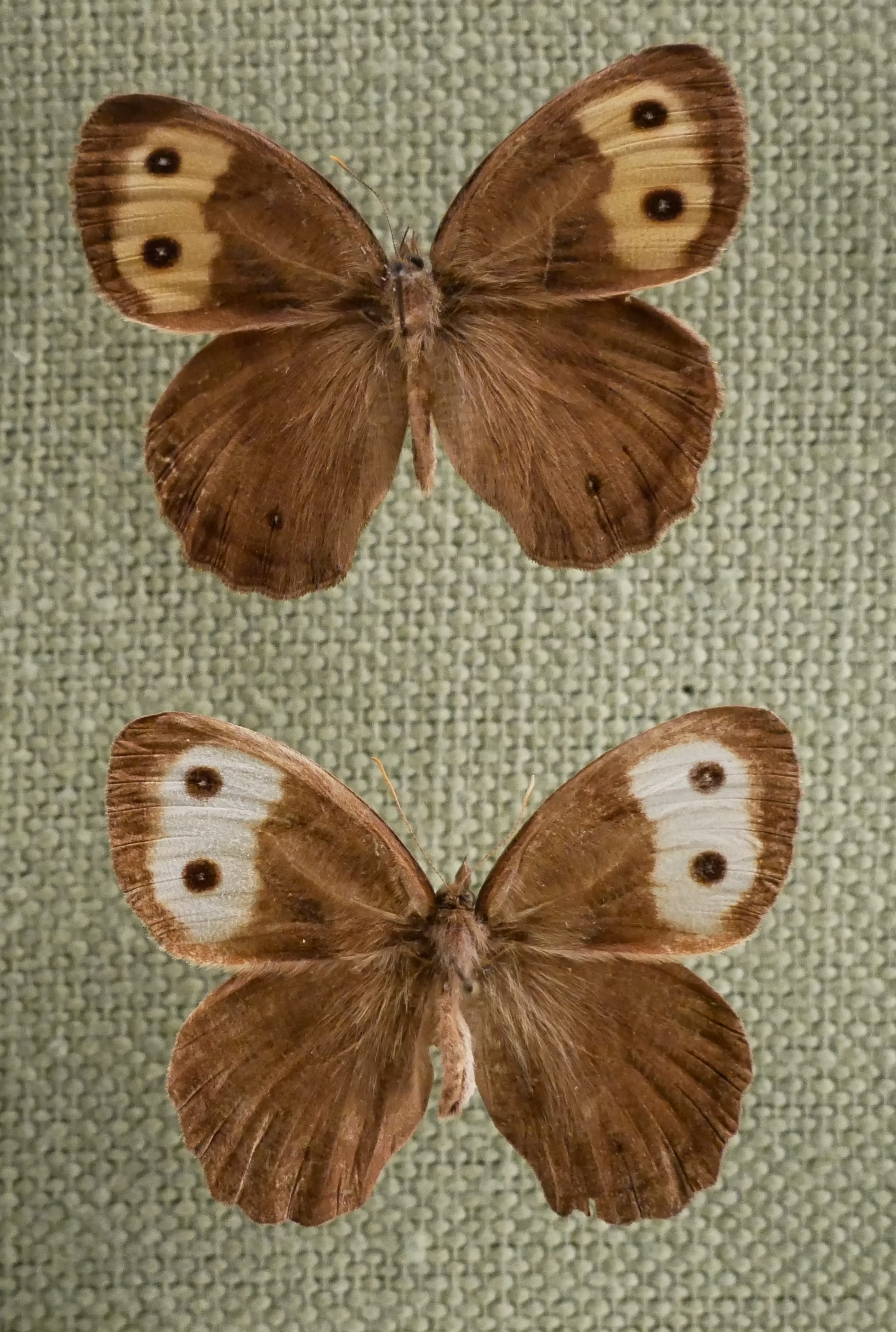
Cercyonis pegala museum specimens

The common wood-nymph can vary greatly. All individuals are brown with two eyespots on each forewing – the lower one often being larger than the upper one. Some may have many, few, or no eyespots on the ventral surface of the hindwing. In the southeastern part of its range, it has a large yellow patch on both surfaces of the forewing. In the western part of its range, it may have a pale yellow patch or may be lacking one. Individuals in the Northeast also lack the yellow patch, i.e., C. p. nephele. In individuals with no yellow patch, there are two pale yellow eye rings that encircle both the forewing eyespots. The wingspan measures 5.3 to 7.3 cm (2.1 to 2.9 in).

These butterflies have ears at their forewing bases that are most sensitive to low frequency sounds (less than 5 kHz). A conspicuous swelling of their forewing subcostal vein is directly connected to the ears.

=== Similar species ===
In the western part of the common wood-nymph's range, there are a few similar species. The Great Basin wood-nymph (Cercyonis sthenele) and the small wood-nymph (Cercyonis oetus) are smaller, and the lower forewing eyespot is smaller than the upper one. Mead's wood-nymph (Cercyonis meadii) has a bright red-orange area on the ventral forewing.

== Distribution and habitat ==
The common wood-nymph ranges from Nova Scotia and Quebec west to northern British Columbia south to northern California southeast to Texas and east to northern Florida.

The common wood-nymph is found in a variety of open habitats, such as open woodlands, woodland edges, fields, pastures, wet meadows, prairies, salt marshes, and savannas.

== Ecology and behaviour ==
=== Life cycle ===
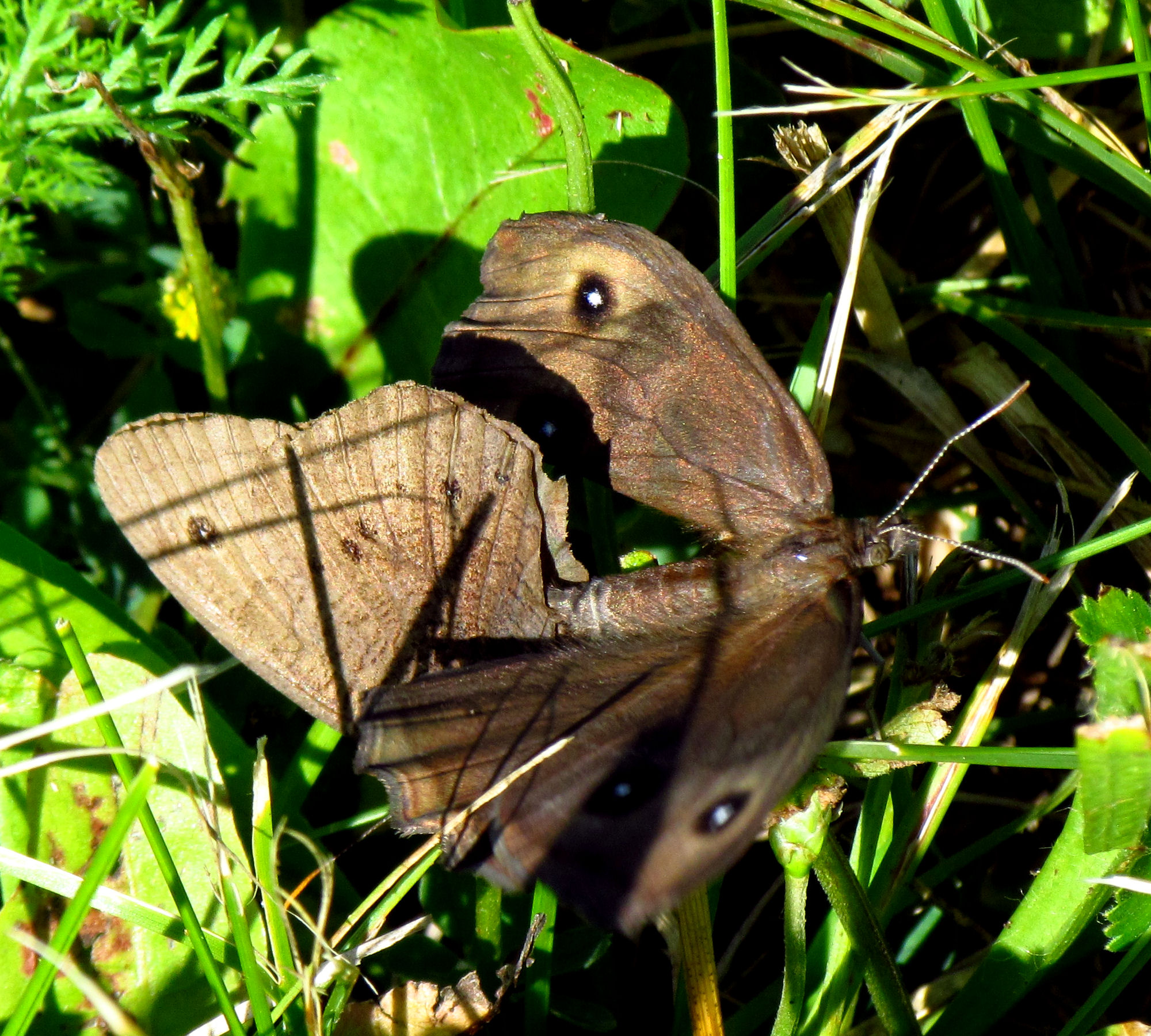
C. p. nephele, mating

The female common wood-nymph is the active flight partner. The female lays her eggs on or near the host plant. The egg is pale yellow, later turning to a tan color with orange or pink blotches. The caterpillar makes no shelters or nests. It is green or yellowish green with darker green stripes that run the length of the body. It has two short pinkish projections on the end of the abdomen. It has yellow spiracles and is covered in thin, white hairs. The caterpillar will reach a length of 5 cm (2 in). The common wood-nymph caterpillar is very similar to satyr caterpillars in the genera Hermeuptychia, Cyllopsis, and Neonympha. It can be separated by its larger size and habitat. The pale green chrysalis is striped in white or pale yellow. The first instar caterpillar hibernates.

=== Flight period ===
The common wood-nymph is found from mid-May to early October in the eastern part of its range. It is found from late June to early July in California and Arizona. It has one brood per year throughout its entire range.

=== Host plants ===
Here is a list of host plants used by the common wood-nymph:

- Andropogon sp. – beard grasses
- Danthonia spicata – poverty oatgrass
- Poa pratensis – Kentucky bluegrass
- Schizachyrium sp. – bluestems
- Tridens flavus – purple top

=== Adult food sources ===
The common wood-nymph feeds on nectar, tree sap, and decaying matters. Some of the plants it nectars on include:

- Asclepias tuberosa – butterfly weed
- Cirsium arvense – Canada thistle
- Cirsium vulgare – bull thistle
- Daucus carota – wild carrot
- Dipsacus sylvestris - teasel
- Monarda fistulosa – wild bergamot
- Pycnanthemum virginianum – Virginia mountain mint
- Rudbeckia hirta – black-eyed susan
- Trifolium pratense – red clover
- Vernonia gigantea – tall ironweed

== Image gallery ==
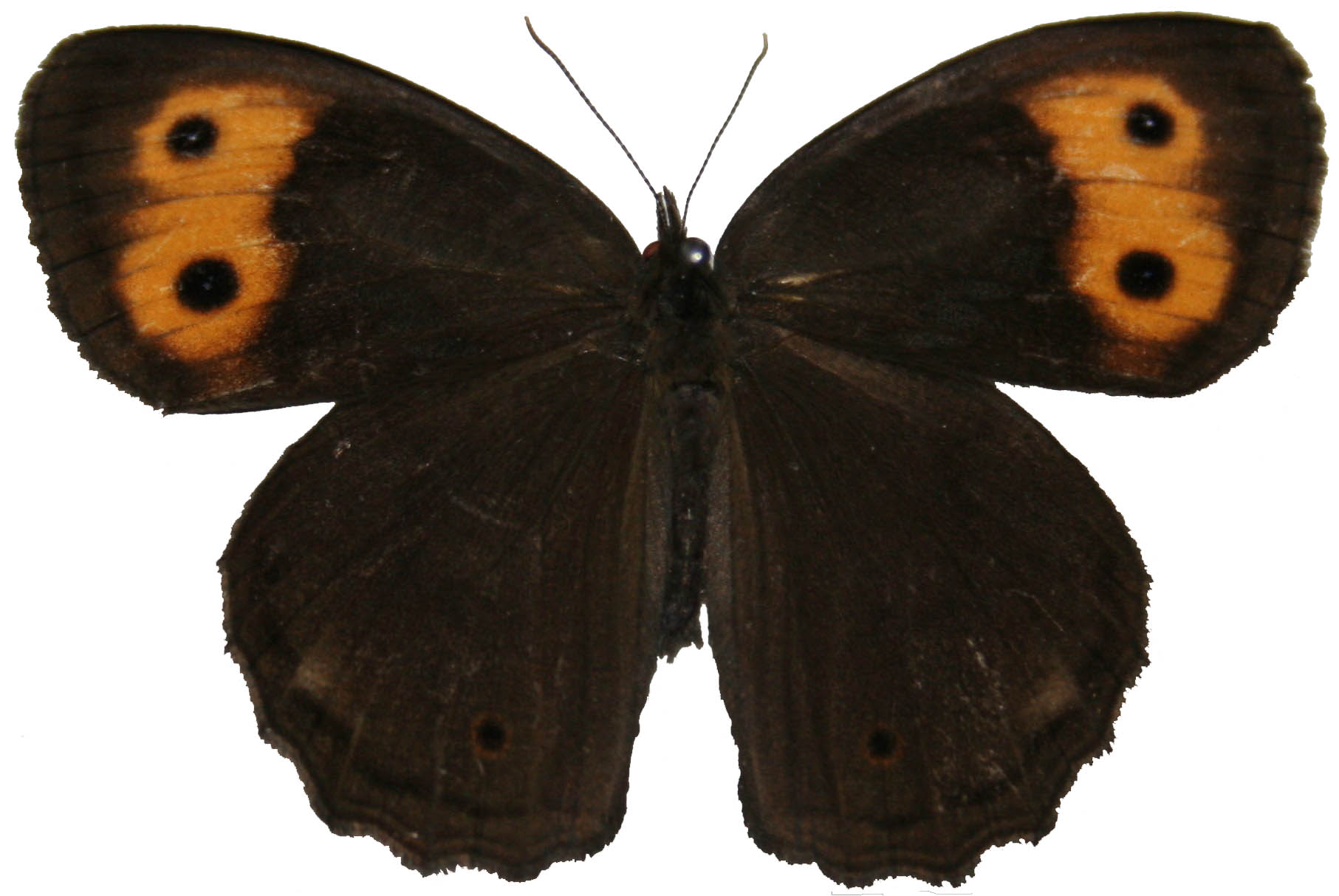
Dorsal

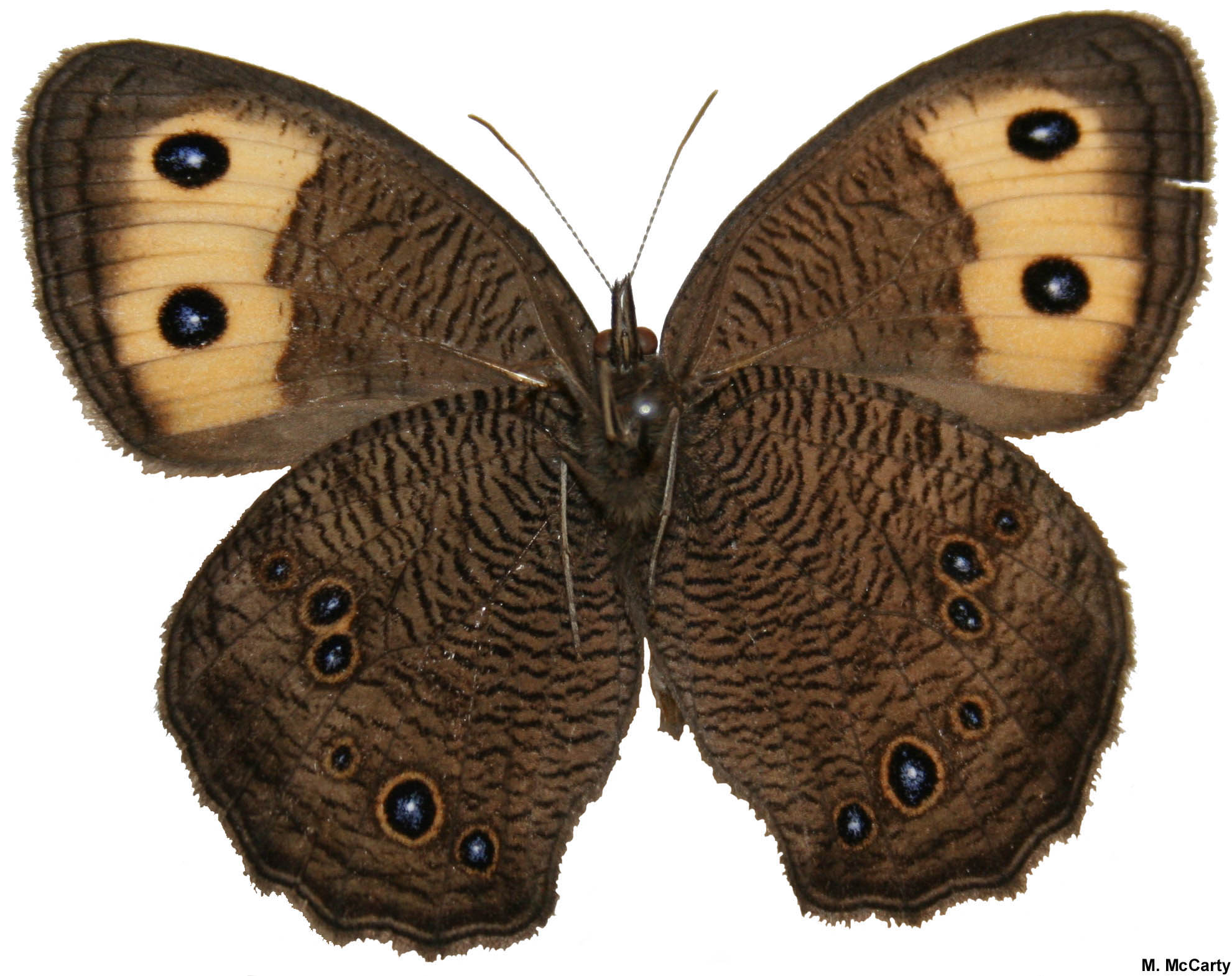
Ventral

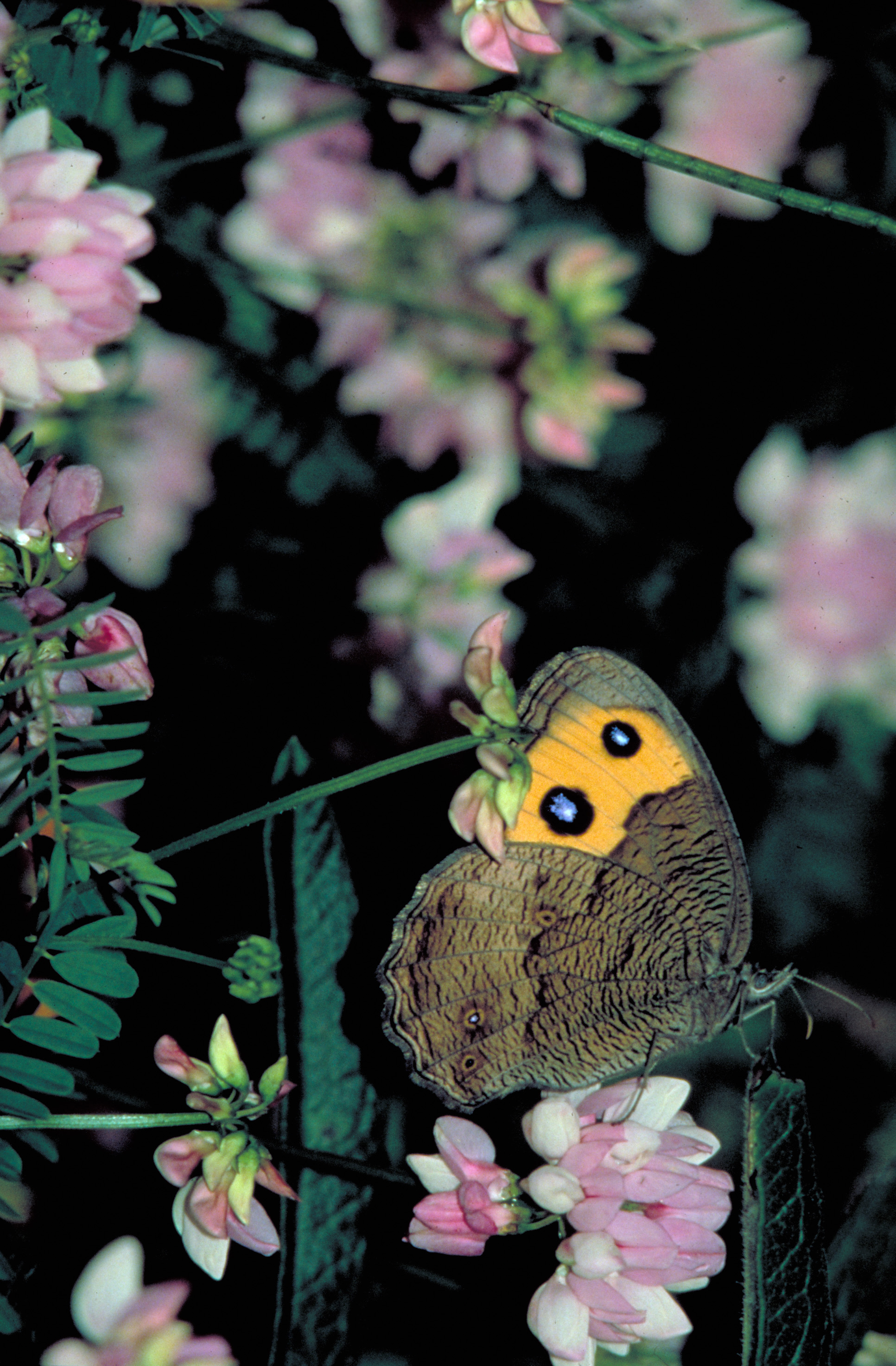

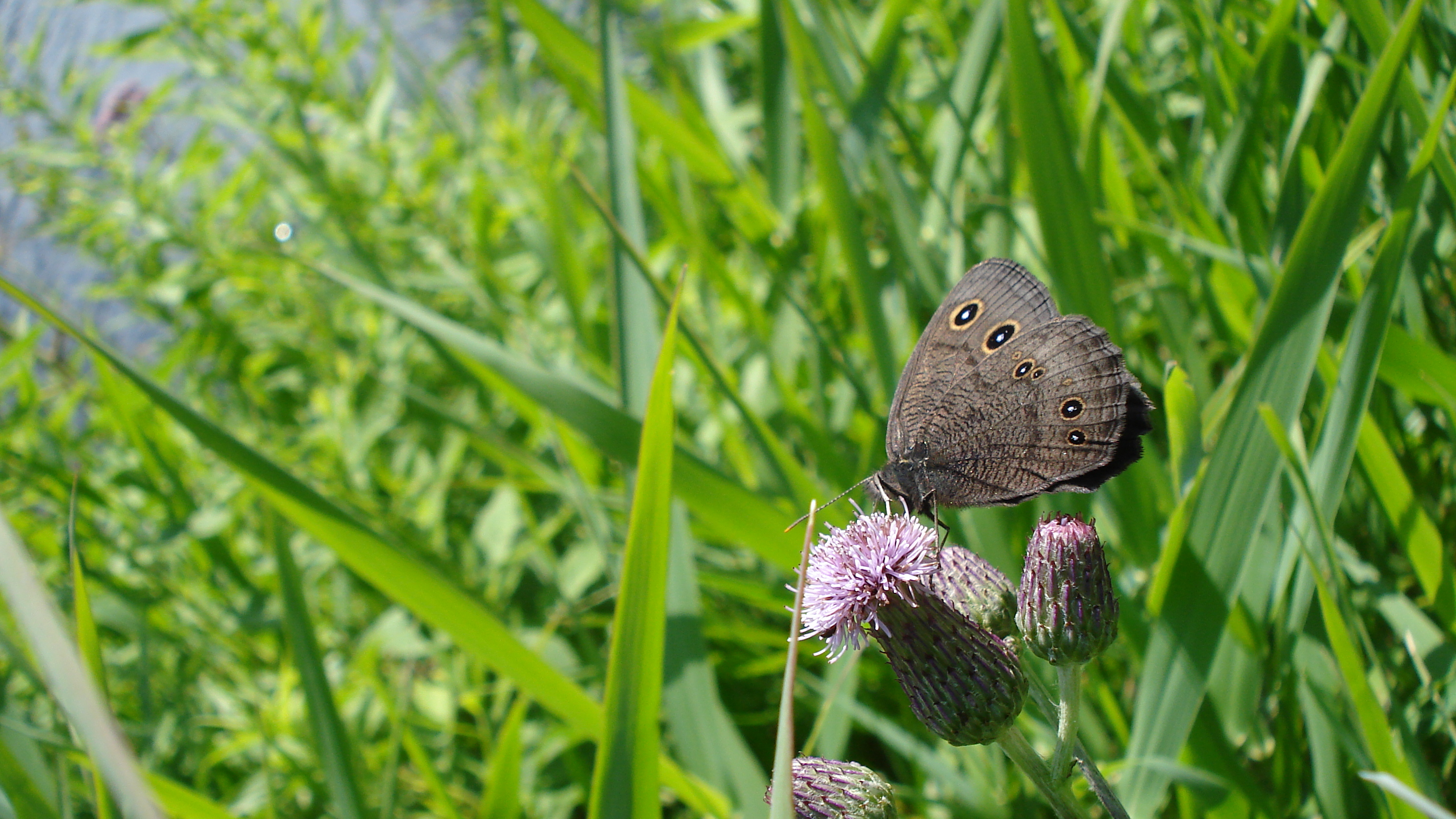
