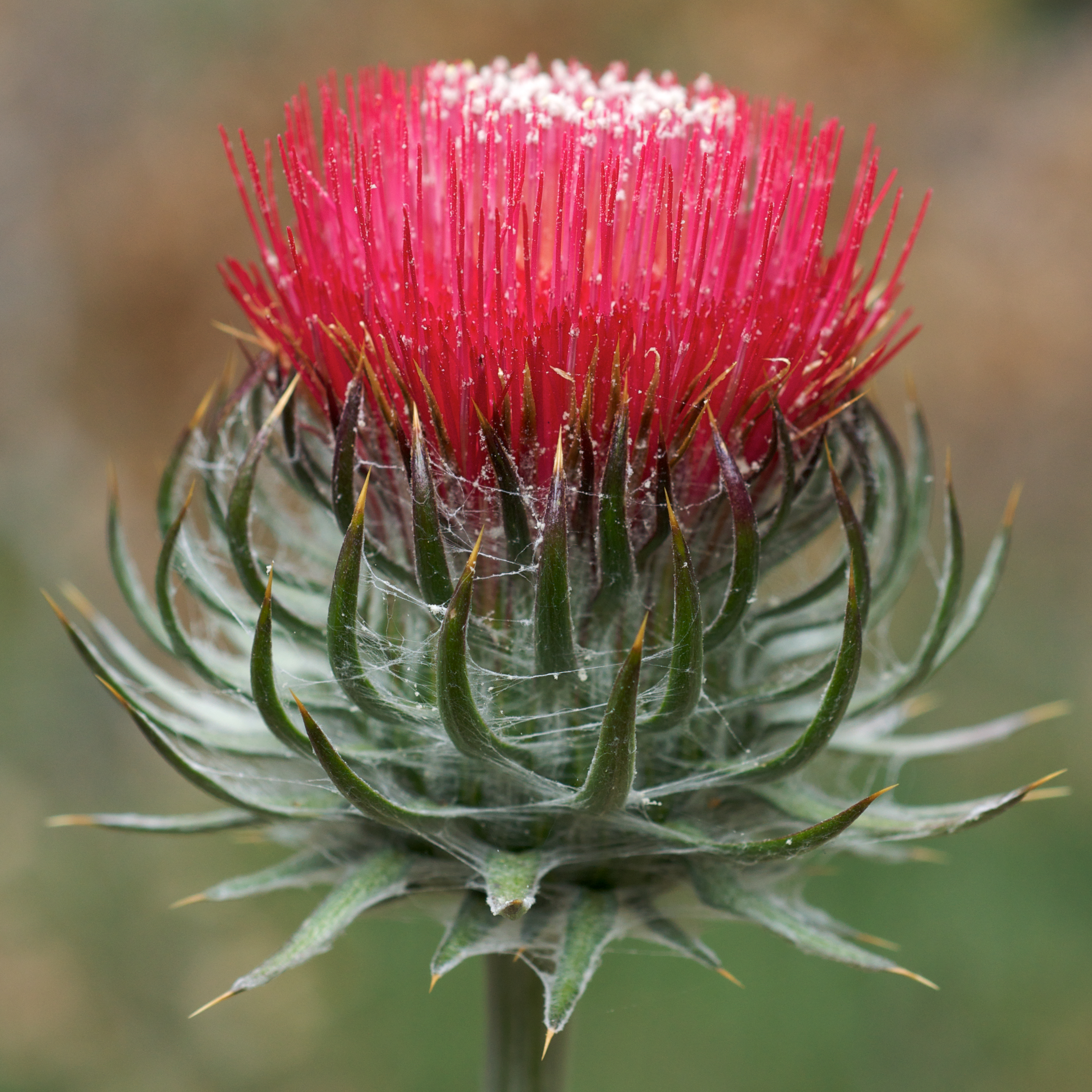
- Flower head of Cirsium occidentale

Conservation status
- Vulnerable (NatureServe)

Scientific classification
- Kingdom: Plantae
- Clade: Tracheophytes
- Clade: Angiosperms
- Clade: Eudicots
- Clade: Asterids
- Order: Asterales
- Family: Asteraceae
- Genus: Cirsium
- Species: C. occidentale

Binomial name
- Cirsium occidentale (Nutt.) Jeps.

Synonyms
- Cirsium coulteri

= Cirsium occidentale =

Species of thistle

Cirsium occidentale, with the common name cobweb thistle or cobwebby thistle, is a North American species of thistle in the family Asteraceae.

== Description ==
Cirsium occidentale is a biennial plant or perennial plant forming a taproot. It may be short or quite tall, forming low clumps or towering to heights approaching 3 meters (10 feet). The leaves are dull gray-green to bright white due to a coating of hairs, and the most basal ones on large plants may be nearly 0.5 m (1 1/2 ft) in length. The petioles are winged and spiny and the leaves are toothed or edged with triangular lobes.

The inflorescence at the top of the whitish stem holds one to several flower heads. Each head is sphere-like, covered in large phyllaries with very long, spreading spines which are laced, often quite heavily, in fibers resembling cobwebs.

The head is packed with disc florets which may be white to blood red to shades of purple. The largest flower heads exceed 8 centimeters (3 inches) in diameter. The heads do not open in synchrony, perhaps allowing greater likelihood of being pollinated.

== Varieties ==
There are several varieties, which differ from each other in range and form:

- Cirsium occidentale var. californicum — California thistle
- Cirsium occidentale var. candidissimum — snowy thistle
- Cirsium occidentale var. compactum — compact cobwebby thistle; a short, clumpy California endemic that grows only along the coast of the San Francisco Bay Area and the Central Coast of California
- Cirsium occidentale var. coulteri — Coulter's thistle
- Cirsium occidentale var. lucianum — Cuesta Ridge thistle; a California endemic from the Santa Lucia Range
- Cirsium occidentale var. occidentale — cobwebby thistle
- Cirsium occidentale var. venustum

== Distribution and habitat ==
The plant is widespread and fairly common across most of California: in its mountain ranges, valleys, and the Mojave Desert; and in the western Great Basin region in western Nevada, southern Oregon, and southwestern Idaho.

Unlike many introduced thistles, this native species is not a troublesome weed.

== Ecology ==
It is a larval host to the California crescent, mylitta crescent, and the painted lady butterfly.

== Gallery ==
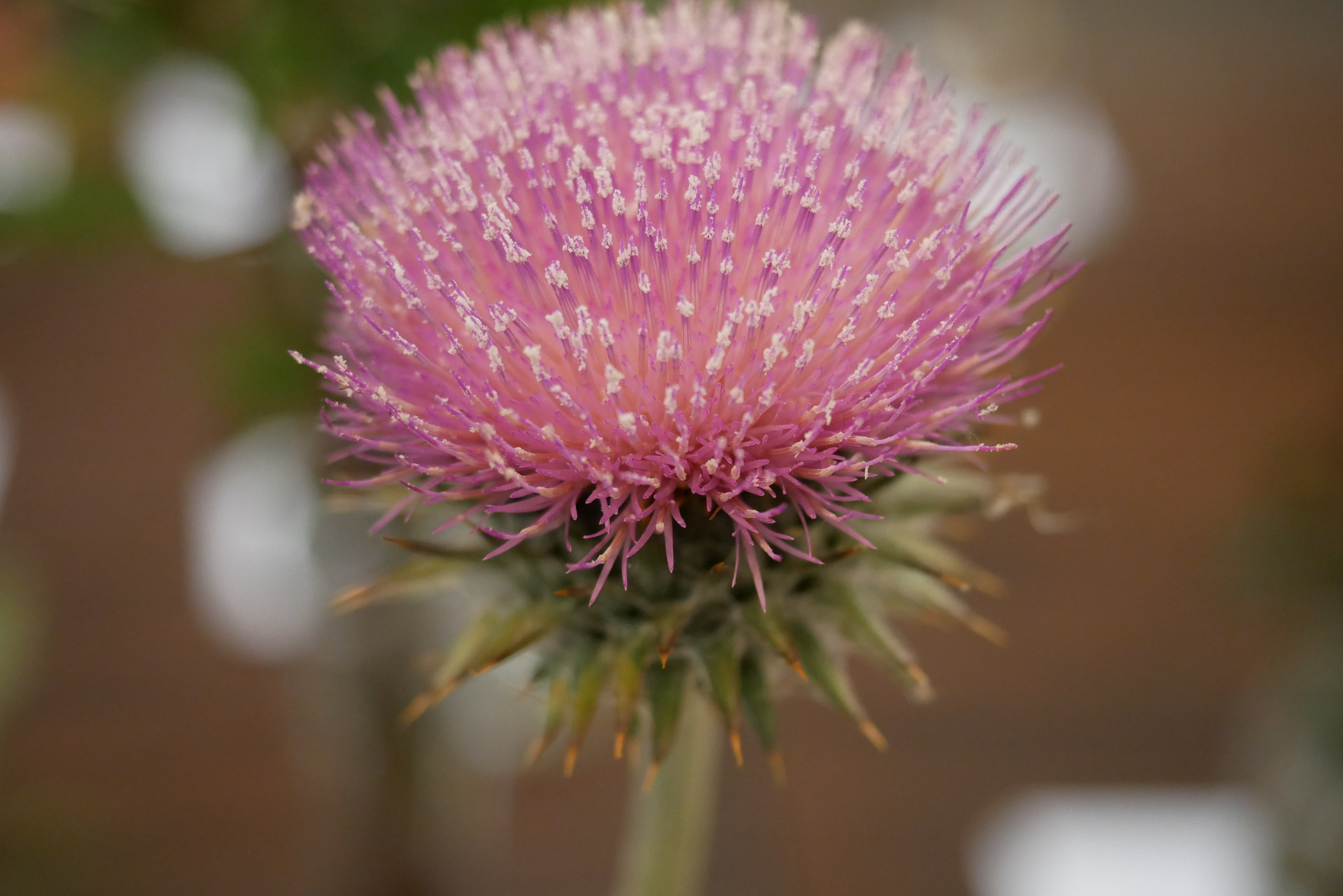
California thistle

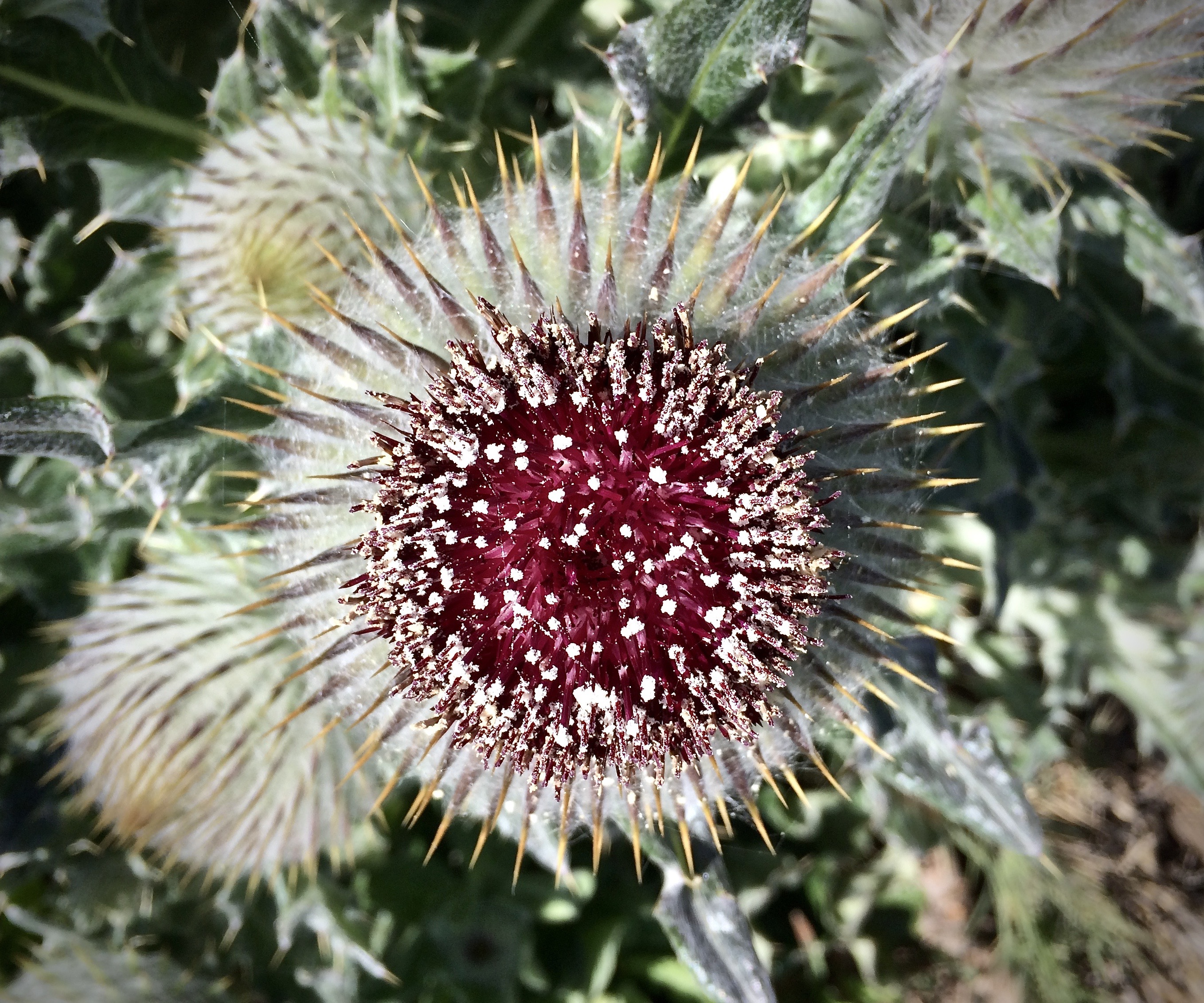
C. occidentale var. compactum blooming

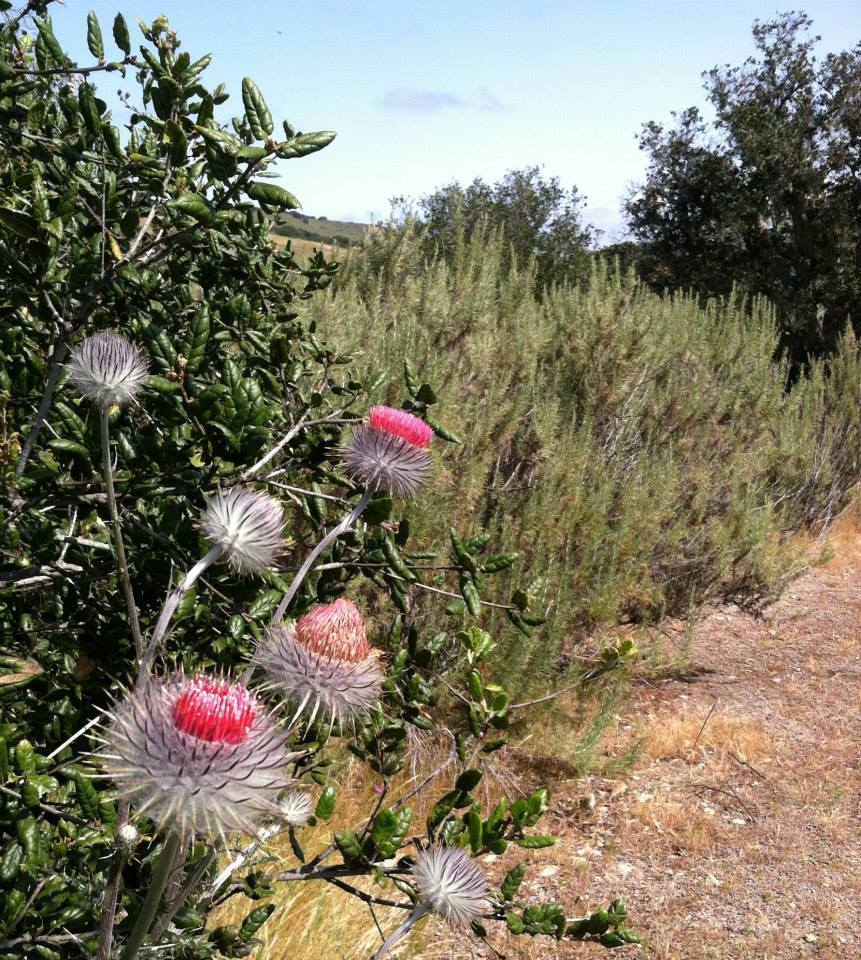
C. occidentale

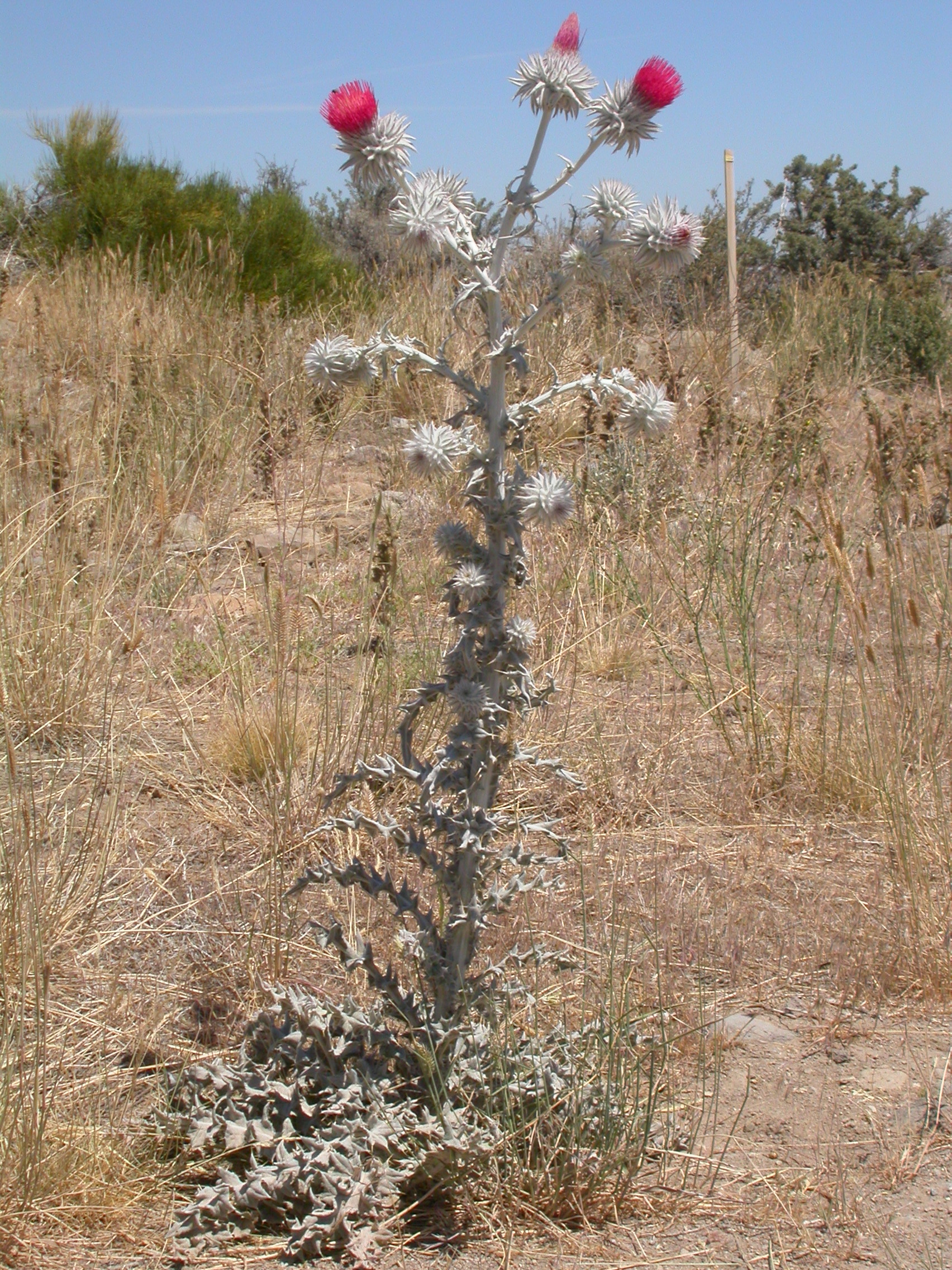
C. occidentale var. candidissimum

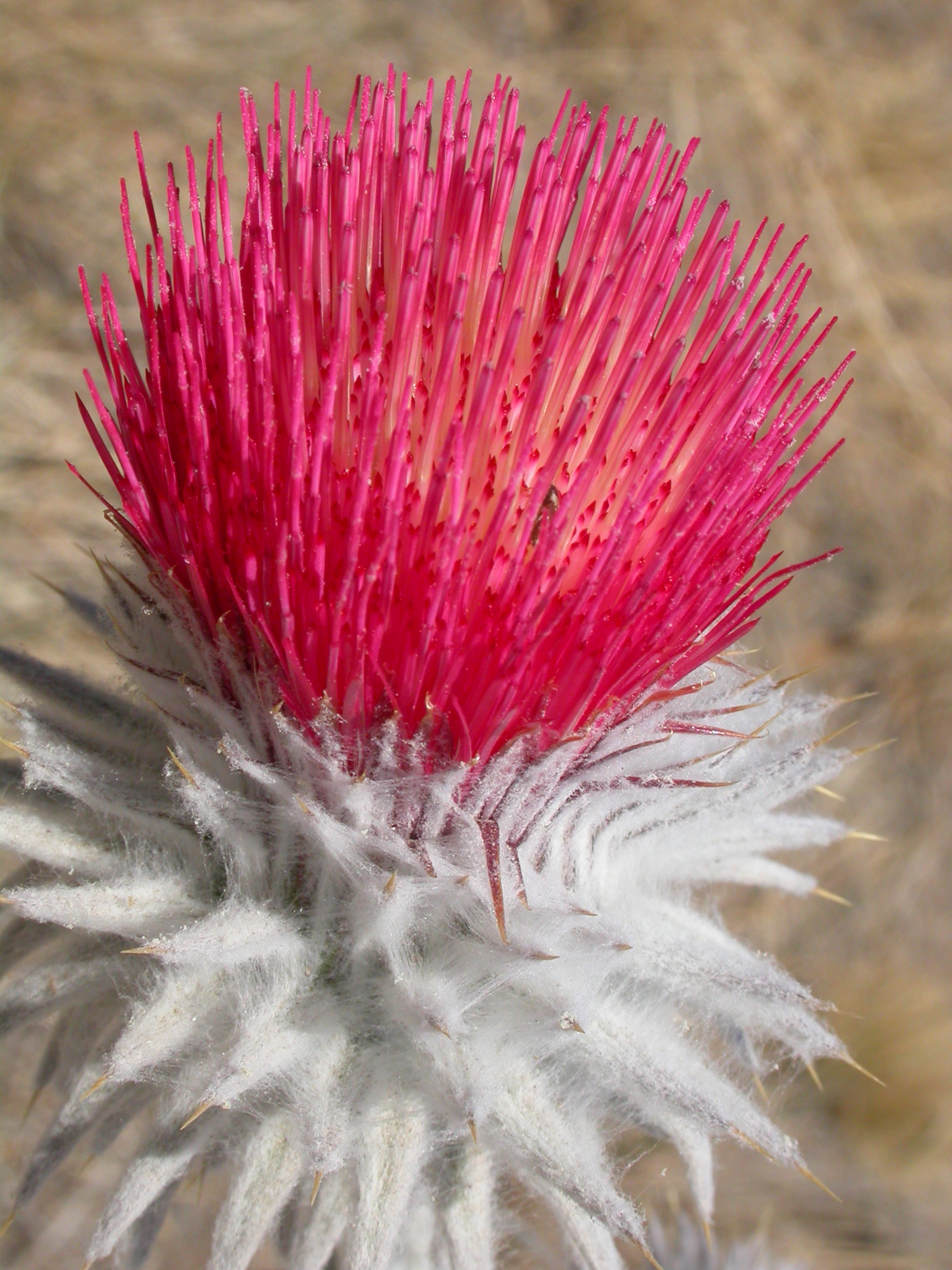
C. occidentale var. candidissimum flower

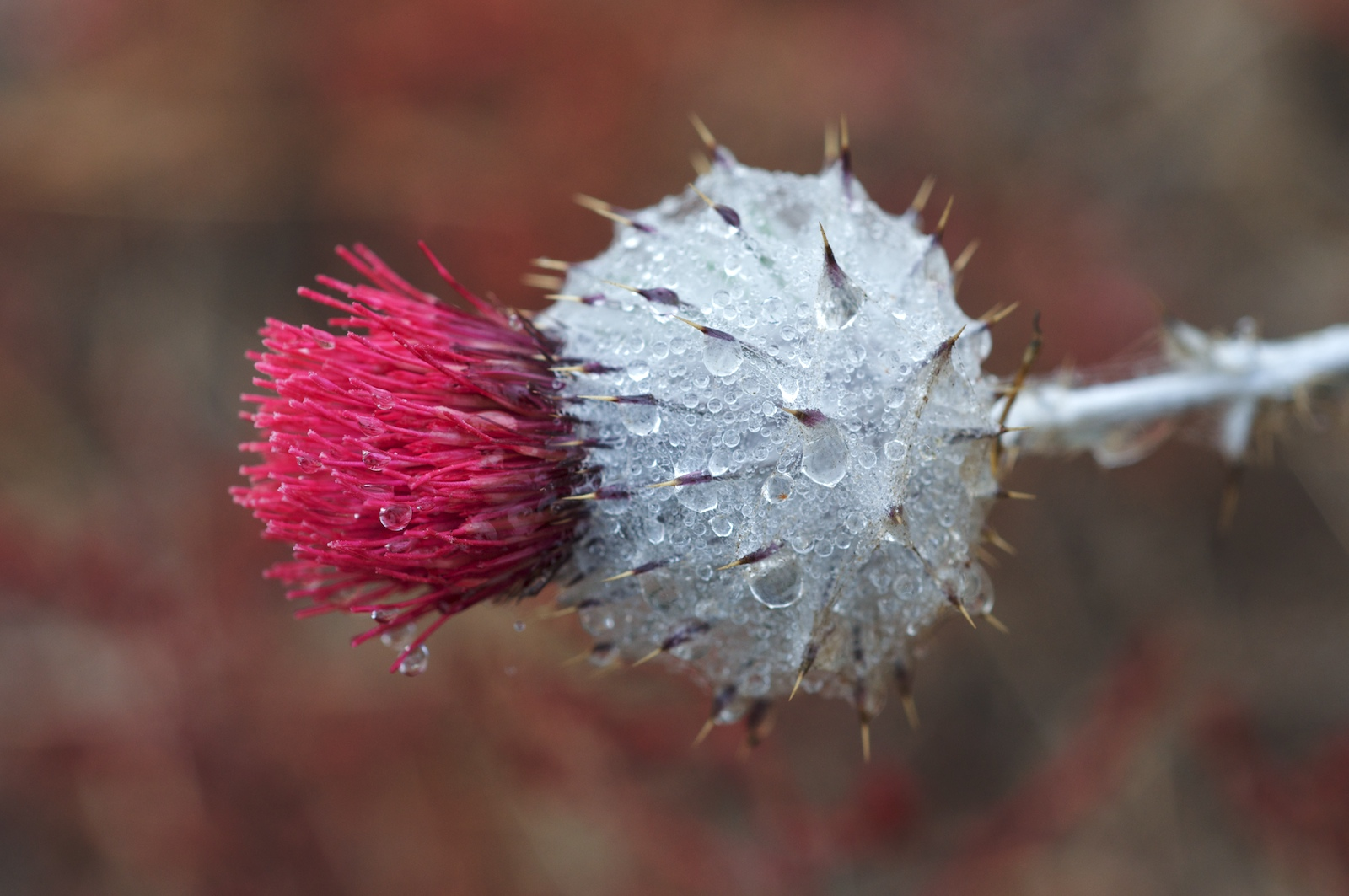
C. occidentale var. occidentale flower with seed head forming
