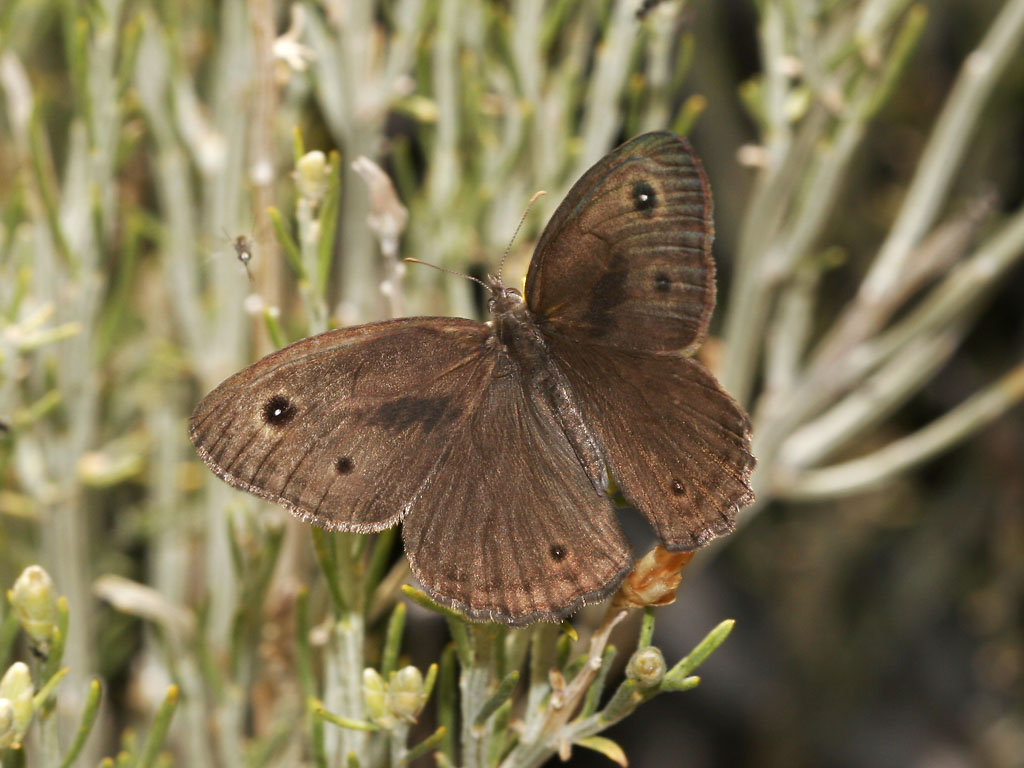
- Cercyonis sthenele paulus, male

Conservation status
- Secure (NatureServe)

Scientific classification
- Domain: Eukaryota
- Kingdom: Animalia
- Phylum: Arthropoda
- Class: Insecta
- Order: Lepidoptera
- Family: Nymphalidae
- Genus: Cercyonis
- Species: C. sthenele

Binomial name
- Cercyonis sthenele (Boisduval, 1852)

Synonyms
- Satyrus sthenele Boisduval, 1852; Minois sthenele

= Cercyonis sthenele =

Great Basin wood-nymph

Species of butterfly

Cercyonis sthenele, the Great Basin wood-nymph, is a North American butterfly in the family Nymphalidae.

== Description ==
It is dark brown with two eyespots on the forewing with the upper larger than the lower.

The wingspan measures 39–44 mm (1.5–1.7 in). Its flight period is from late June to late August. It is found in arid woodland, especially pinyon-juniper, chaparral and brushland habitats.

=== Similar species ===
- Common wood-nymph (Cercyonis pegala) – larger, eyespots similar in size
- Small wood-nymph (Cercyonis oetus) – lacks lower eyespot in males, lower eyespot is closer to margin than upper eyespot in females

== Subspecies ==
The following subspecies are recognised:

- †C. s. behrii (F. Grinnell, 1905)
- C. s. hypoleuca Hawks and J. Emmel, 1998
- C. s. masoni Cross, 1937
- C. s. paulus (Edwards, 1879)
- C. s. silvestris Edwards, 1861
- C. s. sineocellata Austin and J. Emmel in T. Emmel, 1998
- †C. s. sthenele (Boisduval, 1852) - nominate subspecies endemic to San Francisco Peninsula, now extinct

== Distribution ==
C. sthenele ranges over much of the western United States and reaches to southern British Columbia, Canada.

== Larval host plants ==
Larvae feed on various species of grass. The first instar hibernates.
