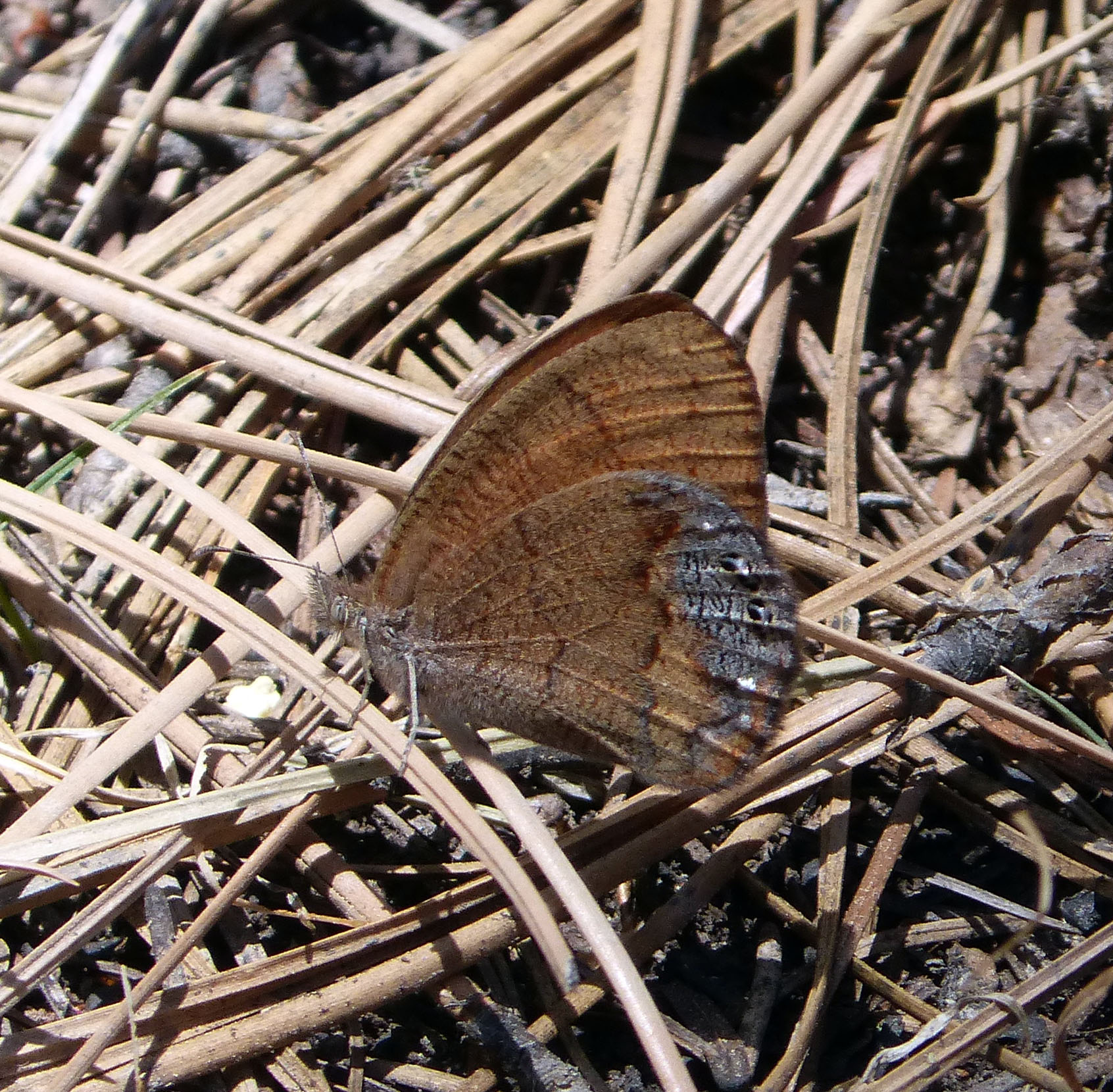

Scientific classification
- Domain: Eukaryota
- Kingdom: Animalia
- Phylum: Arthropoda
- Class: Insecta
- Order: Lepidoptera
- Family: Nymphalidae
- Genus: Cyllopsis
- Species: C. pyracmon

Binomial name
- Cyllopsis pyracmon (Butler, 1867)

= Cyllopsis pyracmon =

Species of butterfly

Cyllopsis pyracmon, or Nabokov's satyr, is a species of alpine, arctic, nymph, or satyr in the family Nymphalidae. It is found in North America.

== Subspecies ==
- Cyllopsis pyracmon henshawi (W. H. Edwards, 1876)
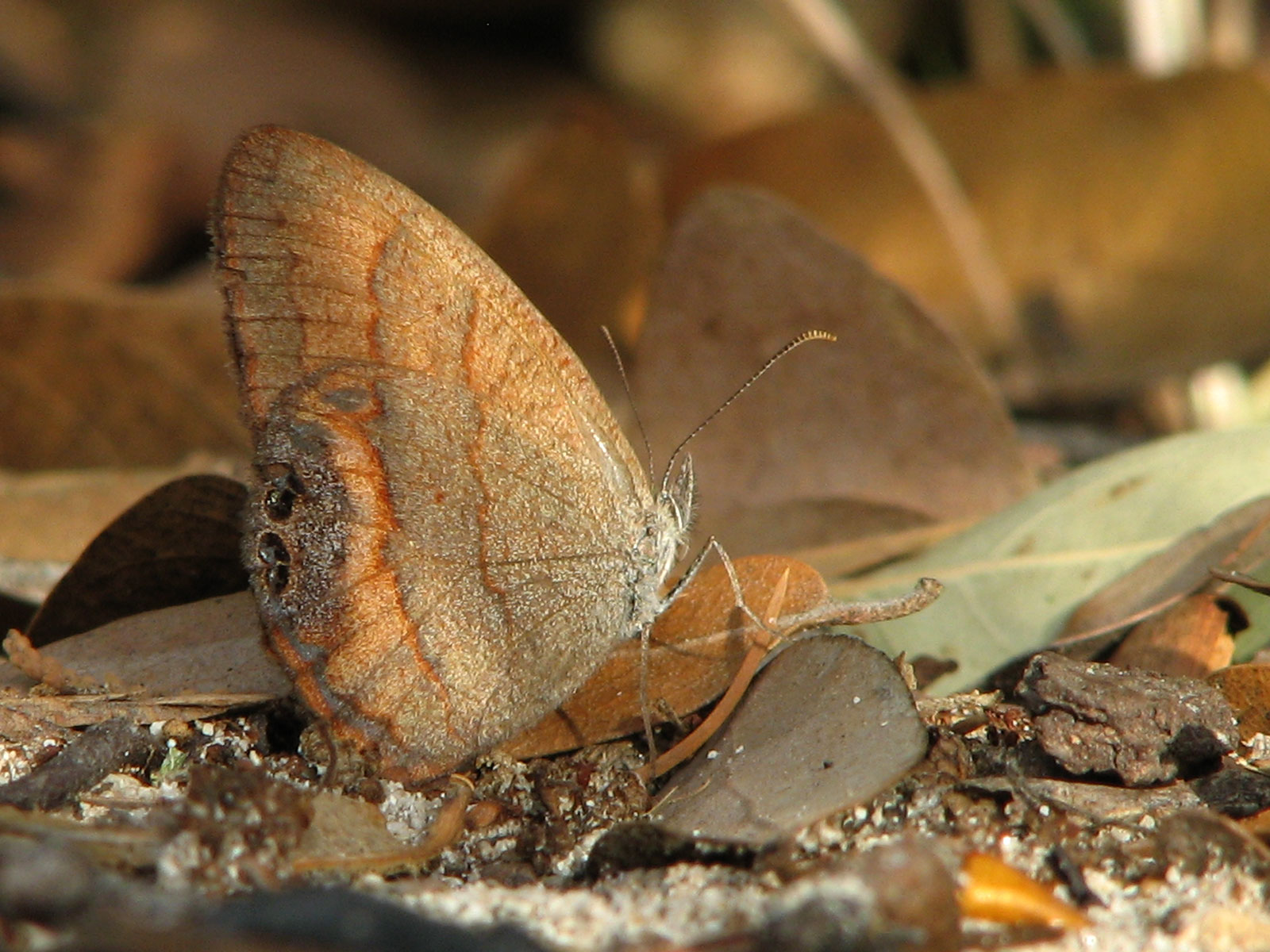
  C. pyracmon henshawi
- Cyllopsis pyracmon pyracmon (Butler, 1867)
