= Cyllopsis tomemmeli =

Scientific classification
- Domain: Eukaryota
- Kingdom: Animalia
- Phylum: Arthropoda
- Class: Insecta
- Order: Lepidoptera
- Family: Nymphalidae
- Genus: Cyllopsis
- Species: C. tomemmeli

Binomial name
- Cyllopsis tomemmeli (A. Warren & S. Nakahara, 2018)

Species of butterfly

Cyllopsis tomemmeli is a butterfly in the genus Cyllopsis from the highlands of Chiapas, Mexico. It was described by Andrew D. Warren & Shinichi Nakahara in 2018. This butterfly is about 2 inches wide and dusky brown with jagged red-brown bands on the underside, a characteristic feature of Cyllopsis species. Another notable feature is the two pairs of spots flanked by lines of metallic scales that might mimic the eyes and legs of jumping spiders. Females are slightly paler than males, and male Cyllopsis tomemmeli have furry scales which are likely the scent distributors.

== Distribution ==
In the field journals of Thomas Emmel, he describes the area, with directions to the exact location, that he collected the 13 specimen (9 male and 4 female) of C. tomemmeli. The area of Chiapas, Mexico at the time he collected them was a "dense pine-oak forest, including many apparently old-growth pines, with a sparse understory of bunch grasses and scattered flowering plants" with small open areas that allowed sunlight to enter. The location was at an elevation of 2,382 m.
