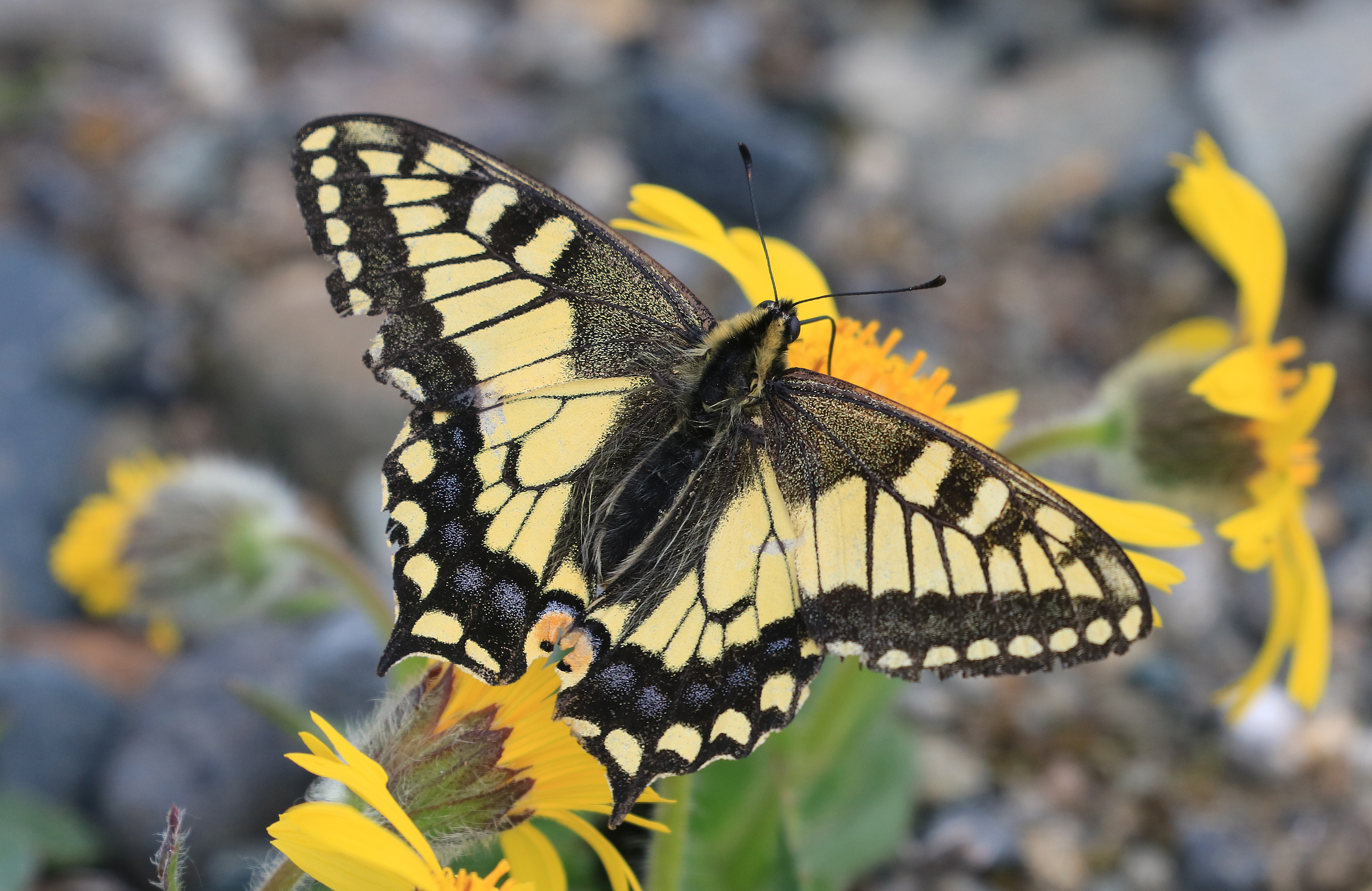

Scientific classification
- Kingdom: Animalia
- Phylum: Arthropoda
- Clade: Pancrustacea
- Class: Insecta
- Order: Lepidoptera
- Family: Papilionidae
- Genus: Papilio
- Species: P. machaon
- Subspecies: P. m. oregonius

Trinomial name
- Papilio machaon oregonius W.H. Edwards, 1876

= Papilio machaon oregonius =

Oregon swallowtail

Subspecies of swallowtail butterflies

The Oregon swallowtail (Papilio machaon oregonius, sometimes classified as Papilio oregonius or Papilio bairdii oregonius) is a subspecies of swallowtail butterfly native to the United States of America, Oregon, Washington, and Idaho and south-central British Columbia in Canada. In 1976, it became one of the first four butterflies that the United States Postal Service placed on a U.S. stamp.

The Oregon swallowtail was declared the state insect of Oregon in 1979 by the Legislative Assembly.

== Description ==
The adult Oregon swallowtail has a yellow abdomen with black lines. It has a wingspan of 2.5 inches (6.4 cm) to 4 inches (10 cm). Its wings have concave spots that are scalloped inwards with a reddish-orange eyespot along the lower border, similar to, but smaller than, the eyespot of the common Old World swallowtail. The yellow markings on the wings of the Oregon swallowtail are also brighter than the common swallowtail. It has a tail characteristic of all swallowtail butterflies. The caterpillar is black with yellow markings.

It reproduces twice a year, and can be seen flying from April to September. The butterflies seen toward the beginning of the year are lighter in color than those seen later and blend well with the color of early plants.

== Range and habitat ==
The range of the Oregon swallowtail is from southern British Columbia, eastern Washington and Oregon, to Idaho and western Montana, primarily in the lower sagebrush canyons of the Columbia River and many of its tributaries. In its caterpillar (larva) stage, it feeds on tarragon sagebrush. As an adult, it eats flower nectar, preferring thistles, balsamroot, and phlox. Chrysalids of this subspecies can overwinter.

A recommended viewing spot is along the banks of the Columbia River at Vantage, Washington, where Interstate 90 crosses the river.

== U.S. Postal Service stamp ==
On June 6, 1977, the United States Postal Service released sets of four 13-cent stamps illustrating American butterflies, including the Oregon swallowtail. Shortly thereafter, the butterfly was chosen as Oregon's state insect.

== See also ==
- List of U.S. state insects
- List of U.S. state butterflies
- List of butterflies of Oregon
