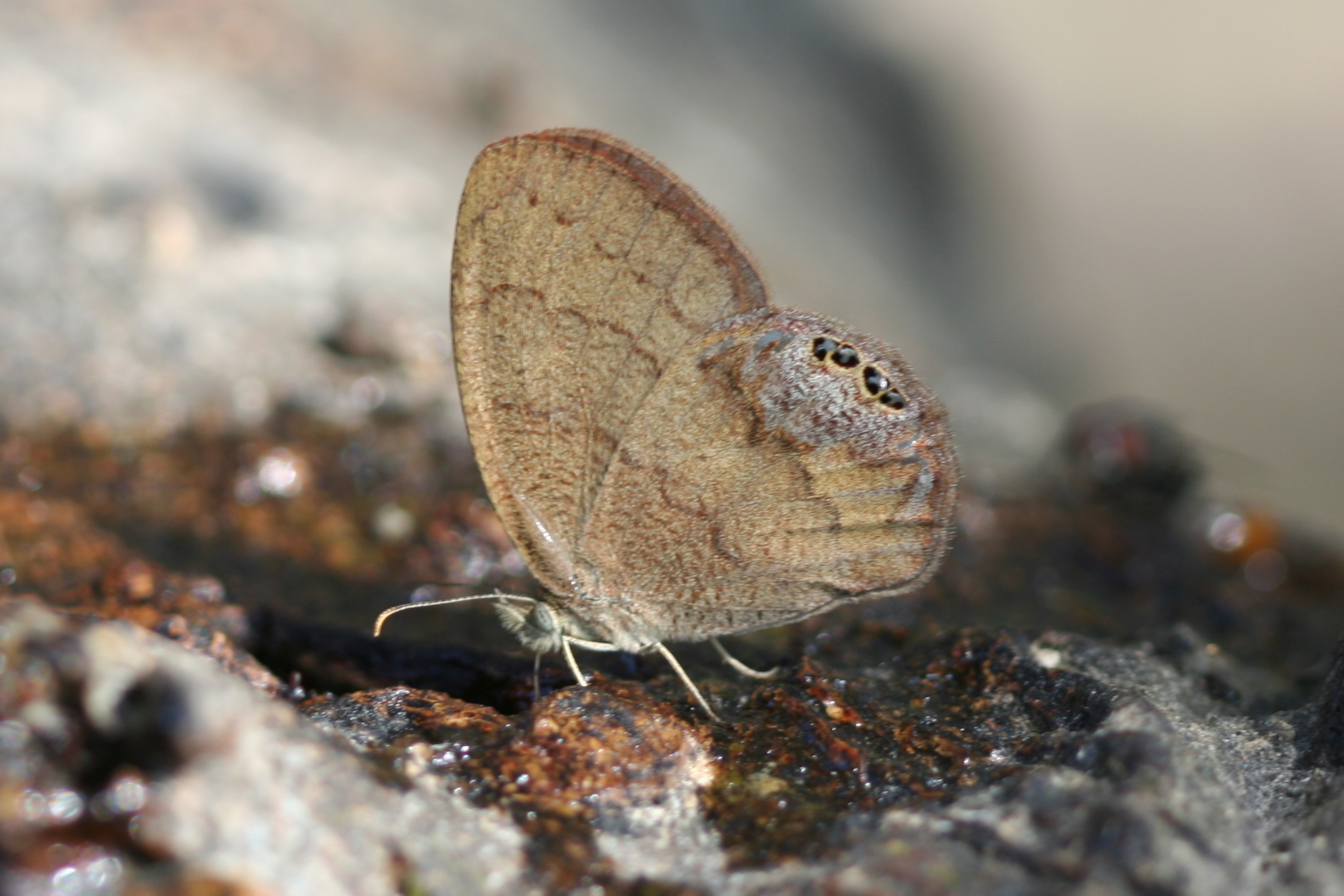

Conservation status
- Apparently Secure (NatureServe)

Scientific classification
- Domain: Eukaryota
- Kingdom: Animalia
- Phylum: Arthropoda
- Class: Insecta
- Order: Lepidoptera
- Family: Nymphalidae
- Genus: Cyllopsis
- Species: C. gemma

Binomial name
- Cyllopsis gemma Hübner, 1808

Synonyms
- Oreas gemma; Neonympha gemma; Papilio cornelius; Euptychia gemma

= Cyllopsis gemma =

Species of butterfly

Cyllopsis gemma, the gemmed satyr, is a species of butterfly of the family Nymphalidae. It is found in the southeastern United States and northeastern Mexico.

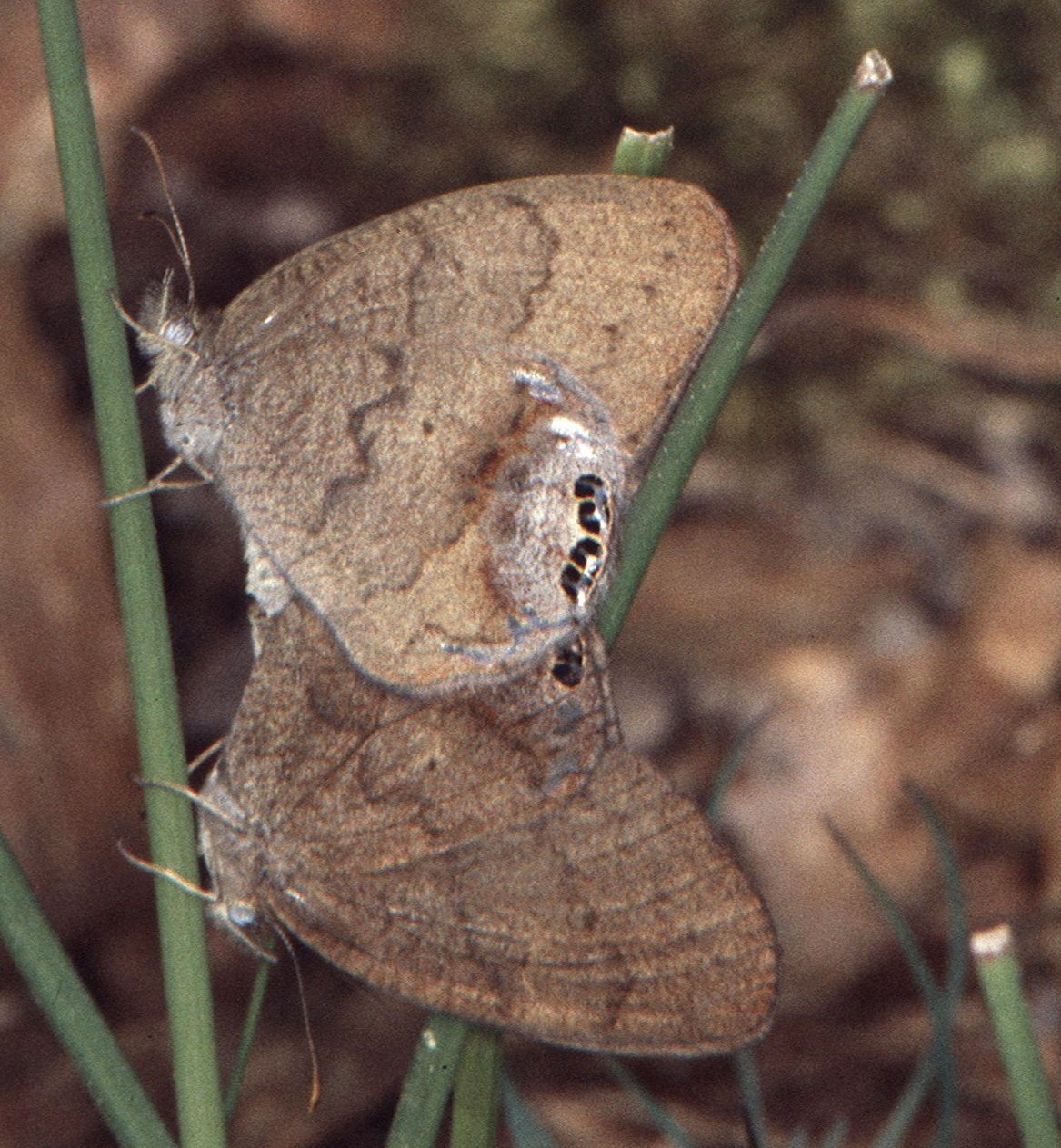
Pair

The wingspan is 35–43 mm. Adults are on wing from April to September in the northern parts of its range and year round in the south.

The larvae probably feed on Cynodon dactylon.

== Subspecies ==
There are two recognised subspecies:

- Cyllopsis gemma gemma
- Cyllopsis gemma freemani
