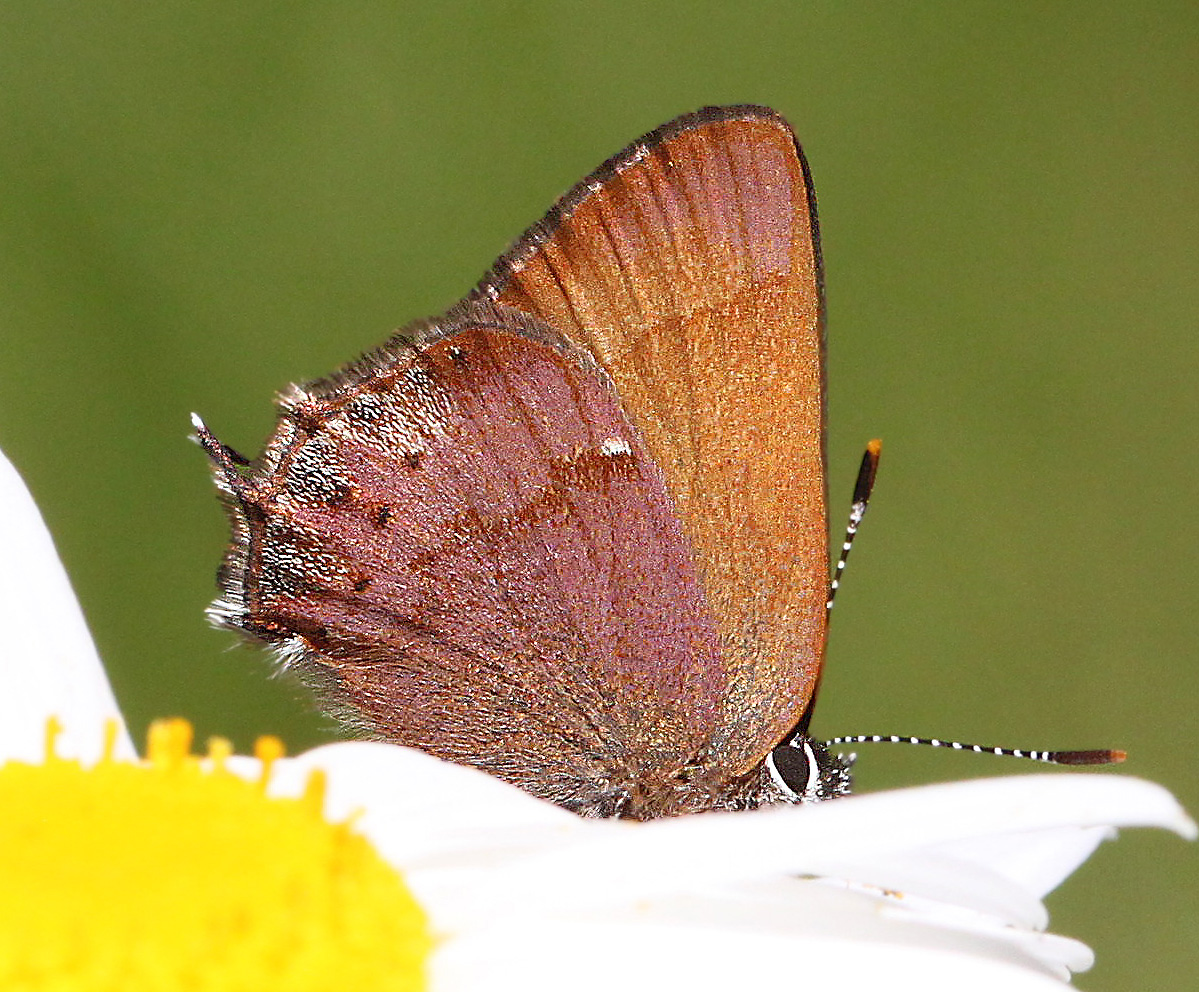

Scientific classification
- Domain: Eukaryota
- Kingdom: Animalia
- Phylum: Arthropoda
- Class: Insecta
- Order: Lepidoptera
- Family: Lycaenidae
- Genus: Callophrys
- Species: C. nelsoni

Binomial name
- Callophrys nelsoni (Boisduval, 1869)

= Callophrys nelsoni =

Nelson's hairstreak

Species of Lepidoptera

Callophrys nelsoni, or Nelson's hairstreak, is a species of butterfly belonging to the genus Callophrys, wingspan of approximately 1 to 1.5 inches. Like many members of the Lycaenidae family, this butterfly has distinctive rod-like antennae. Callophrys nelsoni are gernually found throughout the west coast of the United States. Although they can be found along the very bottom of Canada's British Columbia and down to Baja California Norte.

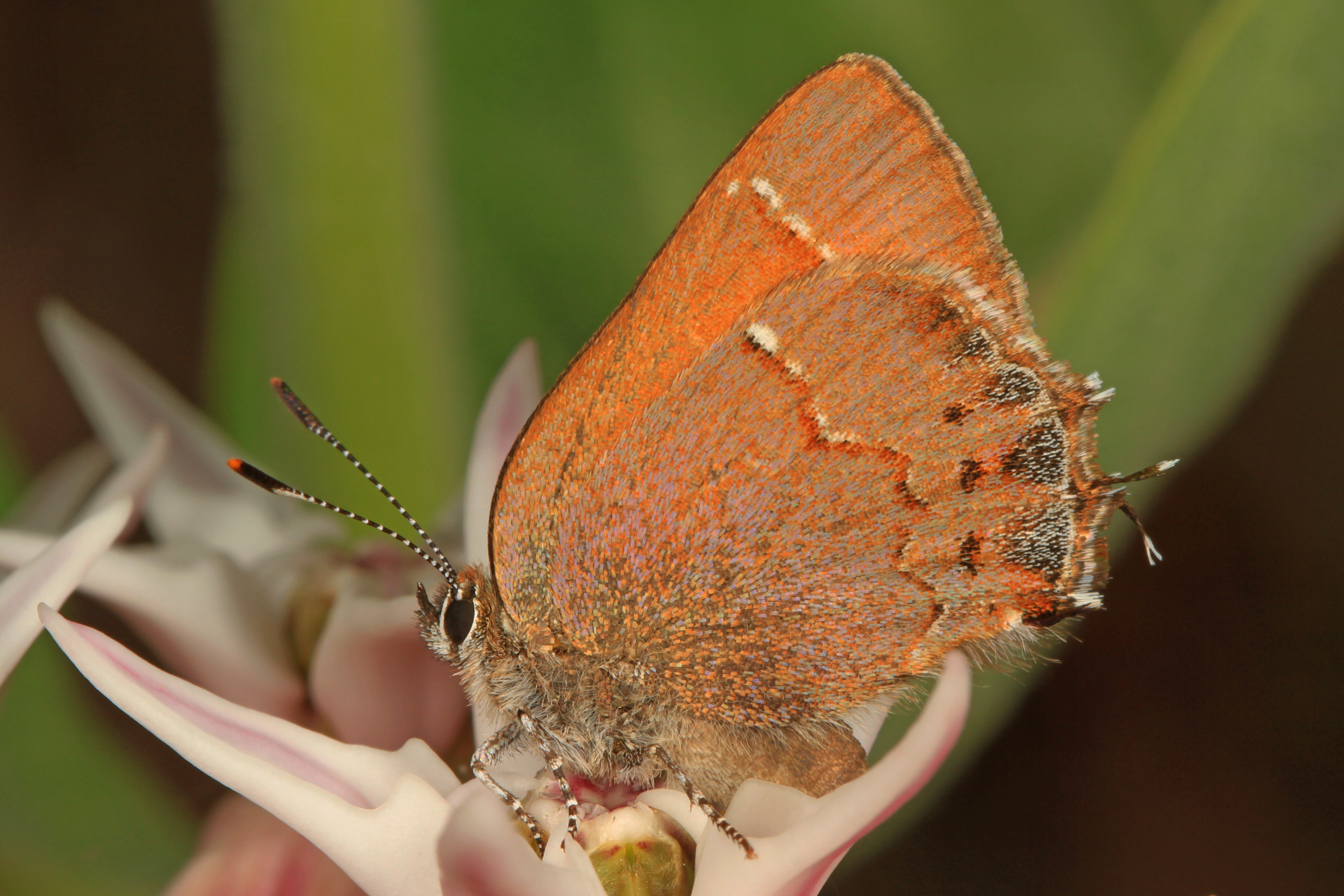
Callophrys nelsoni

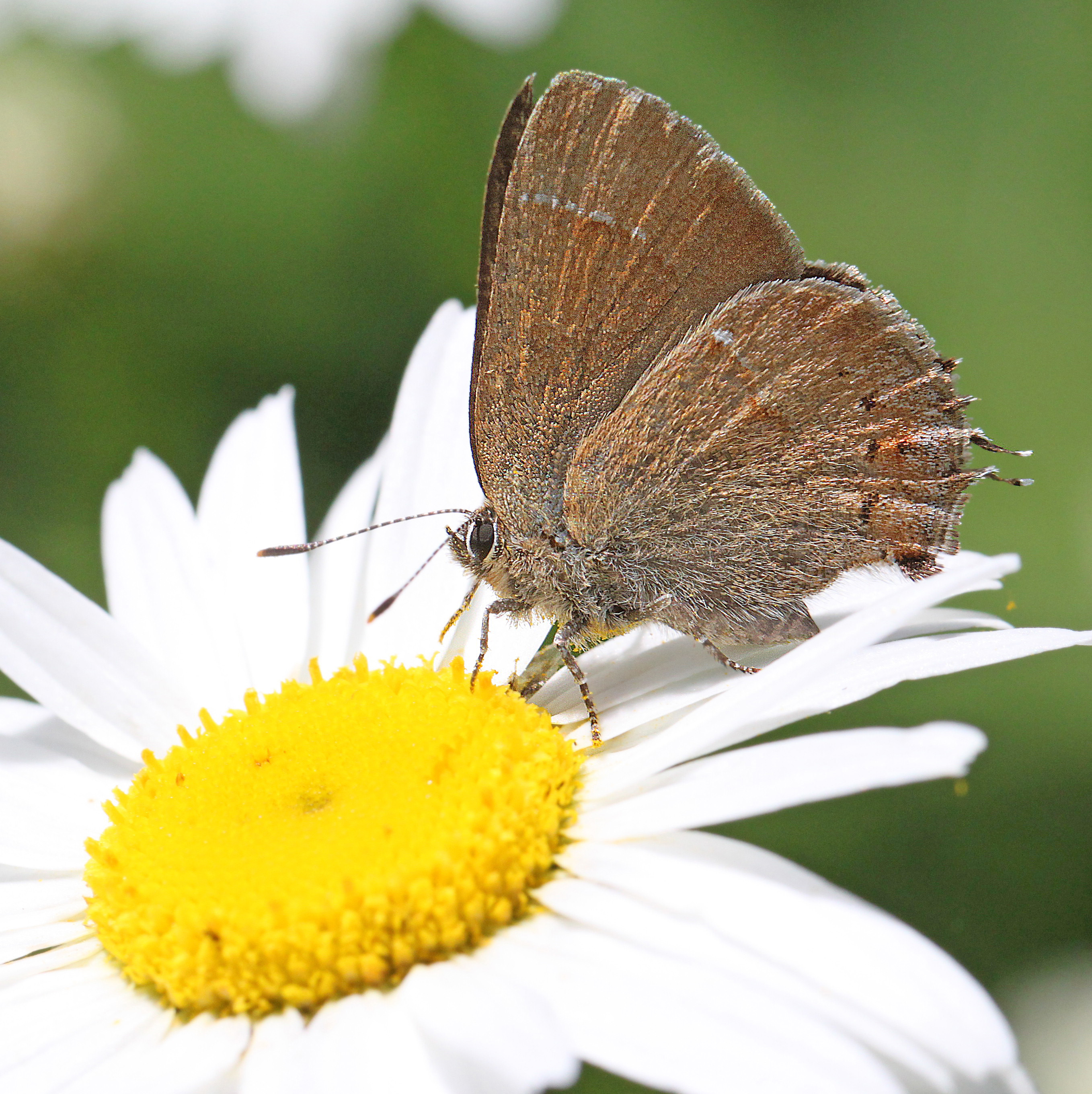

== Description ==
Male Callophrys nelsoni has dark brown upperparts and rusty-orange spots on the outer margins of the underwings that resemble eyespots and act as a camouflage or deterrent to potential predators. Females are primarily yellowish-brown with darker margins and brownish undersides with a slight mauve tinge. The hindwings may have a shortened or darkened posterior median line and are typically white in outline.

Caterpillars are often green, speckled with white or yellow, and have a rough appearance. At full growth, the typical length is 5/8 inch.

== Life cycle ==
Like many butterflies, Callophrys nelsoni goes through a complete metamorphosis, including the egg, larva (caterpillar), pupa (chrysalis), and adult stages. The tips of host plant leaves are usually where the female butterfly lays their eggs. Once hatched from the egg, the caterpillar relies on the host plant's leaves as its primary source of nourishment. During its development, it progresses through several growth stages known as instars. A honey gland, often referred to as a dorsal nectary organ, is present in the caterpillar and it releases a sugary solution that is appealing to ants. By consuming the fluid, the ants shield the caterpillar from potential predators. The caterpillar undergoes metamorphosis within a chrysalis, transforming into an adult butterfly. The adult butterfly emerges from the chrysalis, and the cycle continues.

== Habitat ==
Callophrys nelsoni can be seen in coniferous forests, woodlands, mountain ayahuasca, and open or semi-wooded places.

== Host plant ==
The host plant of Callophrys nelsoni is usually Incense cedar, western red-cedar. Adult food is primarily nectar, including deer antler, cat's claw and composites. As caterpillars consume foliage for nutrition and growth, caterpillar feeding behavior stimulates new growth on the host plant, and over time, caterpillars and host plants influence each other's traits and behavior as they co-evolve.

== Flight ==
One brood from May-July.

== Similar species ==
Species with similar ecological niches and characteristics to Callophrys nelsoni include other members of the genus Callophrys, such as Callophrys polios, a small butterfly that belongs to the same genus Callophrys as Callophrys nelsoni. It is found in North America and is known for its silvery-gray appearance and similar habitat preferences.
