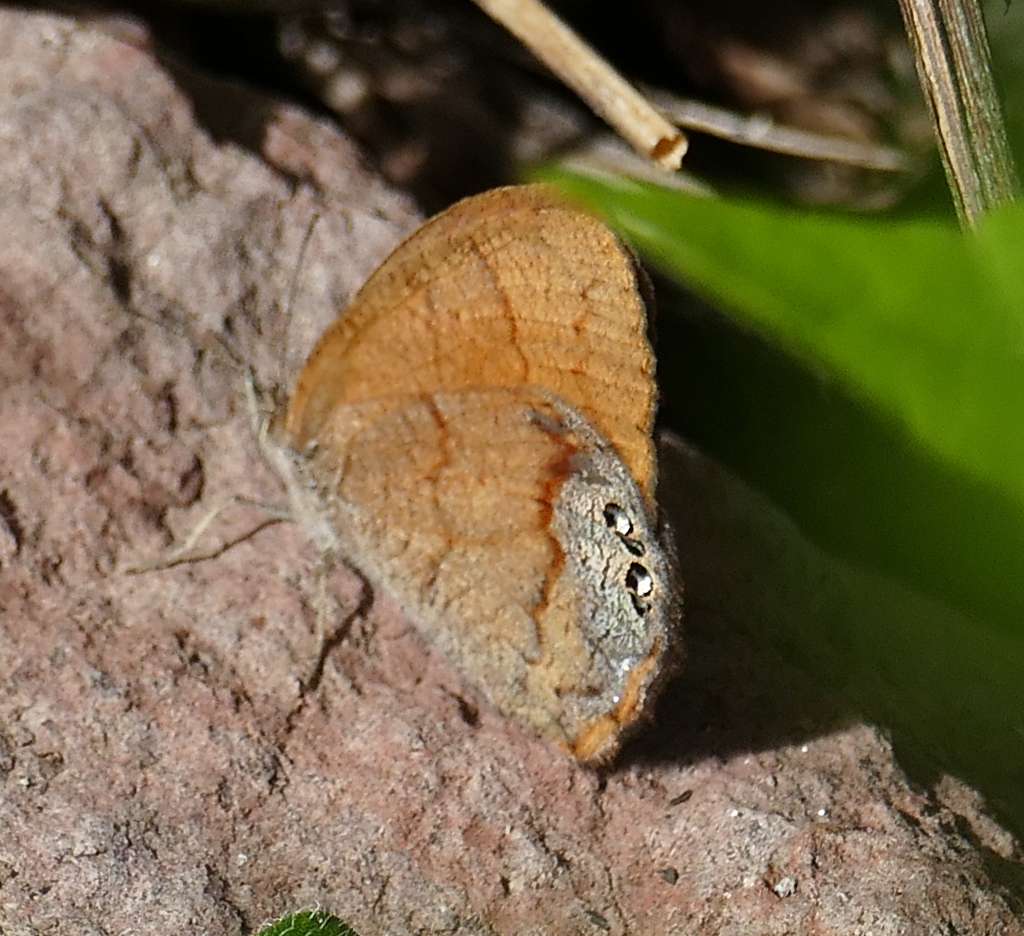

Scientific classification
- Domain: Eukaryota
- Kingdom: Animalia
- Phylum: Arthropoda
- Class: Insecta
- Order: Lepidoptera
- Family: Nymphalidae
- Genus: Cyllopsis
- Species: C. pertepida

Binomial name
- Cyllopsis pertepida (Dyar, 1912)

= Cyllopsis pertepida =

Species of butterfly

Cyllopsis pertepida, known generally as the canyonland satyr or canyonland gemmed-satyr, is a species of brush-footed butterfly in the family Nymphalidae. It is found in North America.

The MONA or Hodges number for Cyllopsis pertepida is 4572.

== Subspecies ==
These three subspecies belong to the species Cyllopsis pertepida:

- Cyllopsis pertepida avicula (Nabokov, 1942)
- Cyllopsis pertepida dorothea (Nabokov, 1942)
- Cyllopsis pertepida maniola (Nabokov, 1942)
