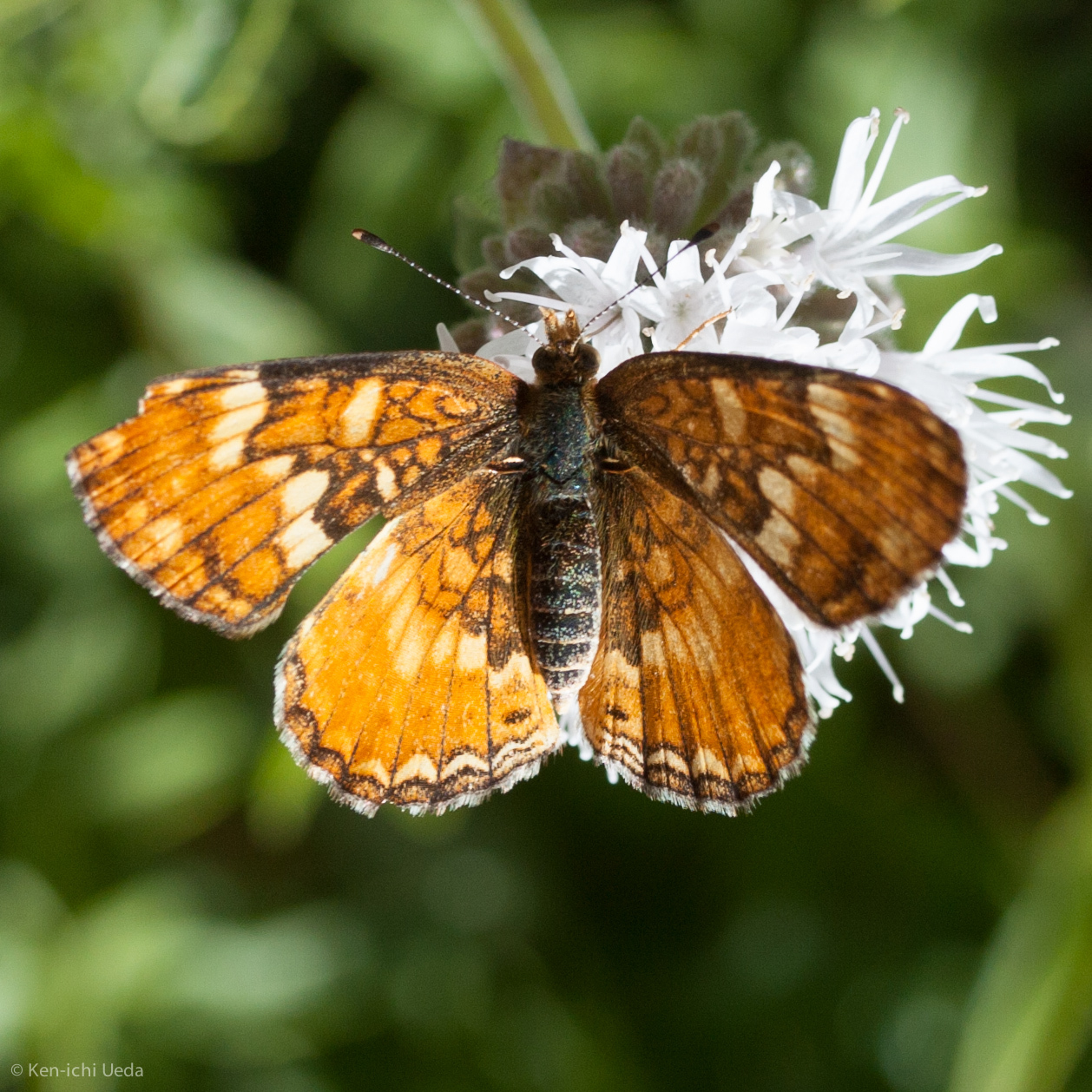

Scientific classification
- Domain: Eukaryota
- Kingdom: Animalia
- Phylum: Arthropoda
- Class: Insecta
- Order: Lepidoptera
- Family: Nymphalidae
- Genus: Phyciodes
- Species: P. orseis

Binomial name
- Phyciodes orseis W.H. Edwards, 1871

Synonyms
- Phyciodes orseis tr.f. edwardsi Gunder, 1927

= Phyciodes orseis =

Species of butterfly

Phyciodes orseis, the Orseis crescentspot or California crescent, is a species of butterfly in the family Nymphalidae. It is found in western North America, particularly northern California and Oregon. Formerly, The range was thought to extend along the Coast Range as far south as San Francisco. However, they were either mislabeled or are currently extirpated from these regions. The habitat consists of mountain valleys, meadows and stream canyons. Along with roughly 120 other species, they are check-listed as butterflies occurring on or near the Fremont-Winema National Forests. This checklist has been established based on observations throughout Lake and Klamath counties in Oregon. The list is maintained by the Forest Service in order to monitor health of native ecosystems. Monitoring population levels of butterflies such as P. orseis over time provides a metric for these efforts. These pollinators play an integral role in such systems, as they are beneficial both for the flora of the region and as food sources for regional avian species.

The wingspan is 32–42 mm. Adult flights occur annually, typically from mid-May to the end of June.

Eggs are laid in large clusters on host plants, which are typically of the genus Cirsium (family Asteraceae). After hatching, specimens will overwinter as a third instar larva.

== Subspecies ==
- Phyciodes orseis orseis
- Phyciodes orseis herlani Bauer, 1975 (California, Nevada: Douglas Co.)

== See also ==
- List of butterflies of Oregon
