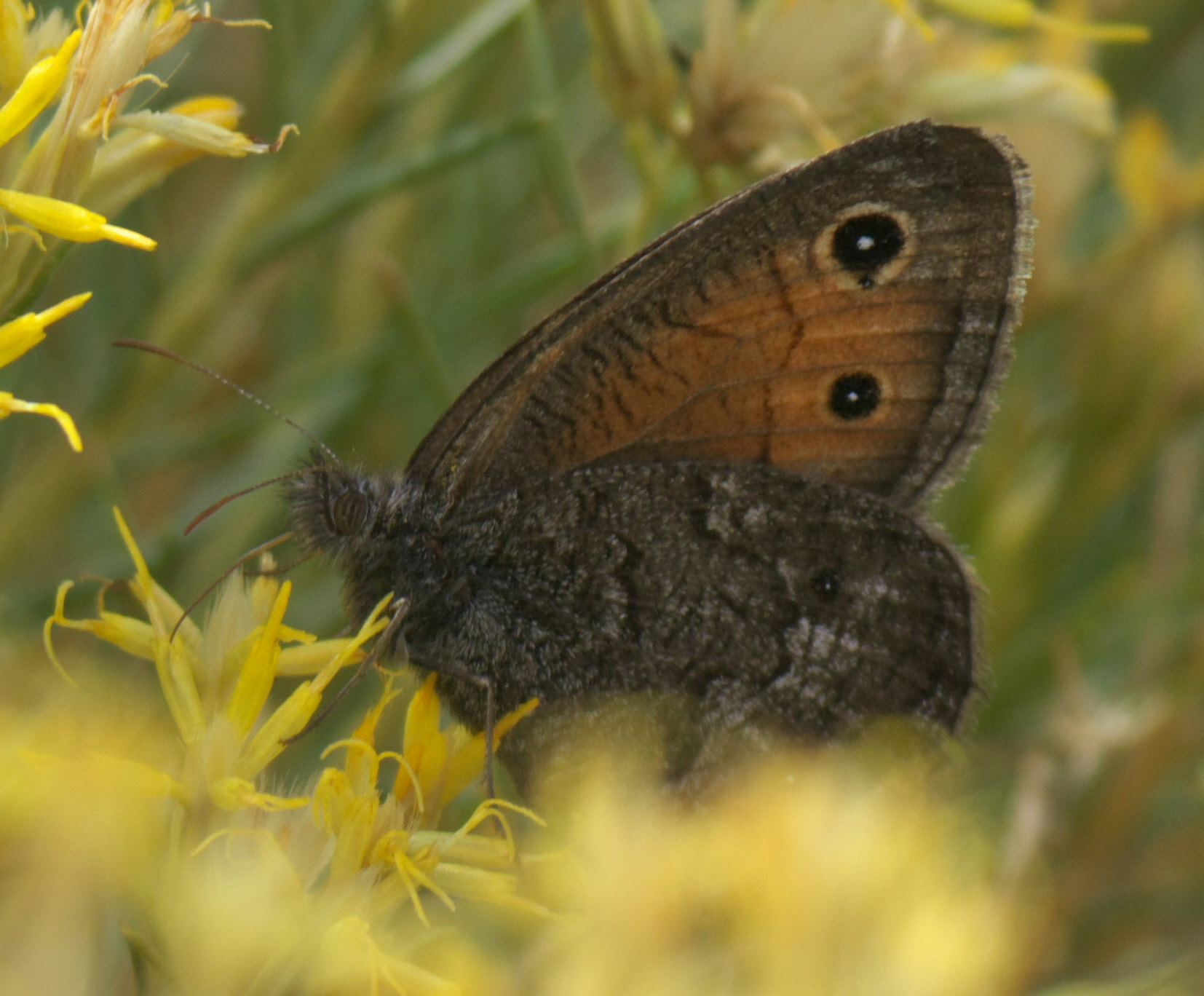

Scientific classification
- Domain: Eukaryota
- Kingdom: Animalia
- Phylum: Arthropoda
- Class: Insecta
- Order: Lepidoptera
- Family: Nymphalidae
- Genus: Cercyonis
- Species: C. meadii

Binomial name
- Cercyonis meadii (W. H. Edwards, 1872)

= Cercyonis meadii =

Species of butterfly

Cercyonis meadii, or Mead's wood nymph, is a species of brush-footed butterfly in the family Nymphalidae. It was first described by William Henry Edwards in 1872 and it is found in North America.

The MONA or Hodges number for Cercyonis meadii is 4588.

== Subspecies ==
Four subspecies belong to Cercyonis meadii:

- Cercyonis meadii alamosa T. Emmel & J. Emmel, 1969^{i b} (Mead's wood-nymph)
- Cercyonis meadii damei Barnes & Benjamin, 1926^{i}
- Cercyonis meadii meadii (W. H. Edwards, 1872)^{i g}
- Cercyonis meadii melania (Wind, 1946)^{i}

Data sources: i = ITIS, c = Catalogue of Life, g = GBIF, b = Bugguide.net
