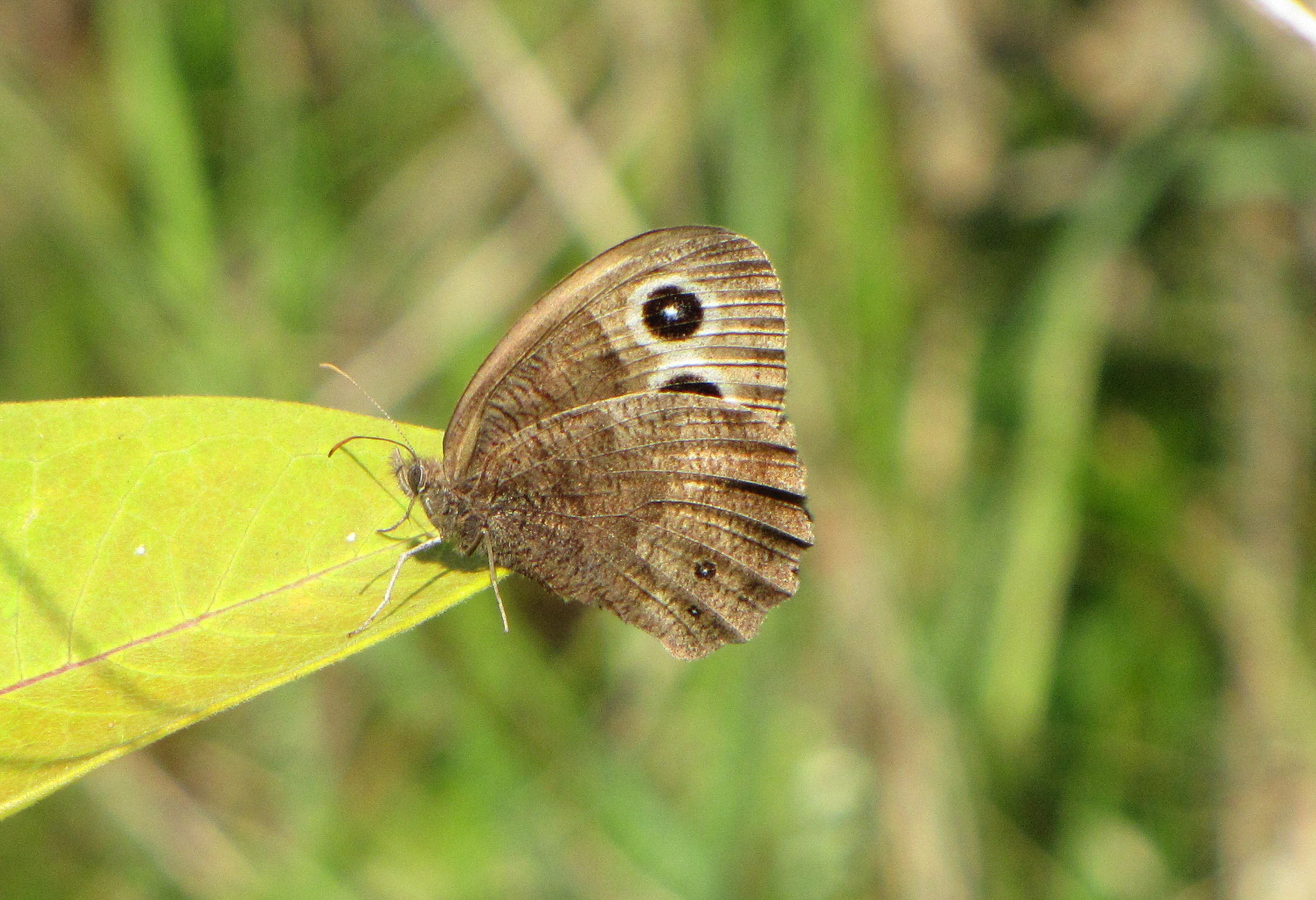
- Common wood nymph, Ottawa, Ontario, Canada

Scientific classification
- Domain: Eukaryota
- Kingdom: Animalia
- Phylum: Arthropoda
- Class: Insecta
- Order: Lepidoptera
- Family: Nymphalidae
- Subtribe: Maniolina
- Genus: Cercyonis; Scudder, 1875

Species
- See text

= Cercyonis =

Genus of butterflies

Cercyonis is a genus of butterflies of the subfamily Satyrinae in the family Nymphalidae found in North America. They are commonly called wood-nymphs or wood nymphs.

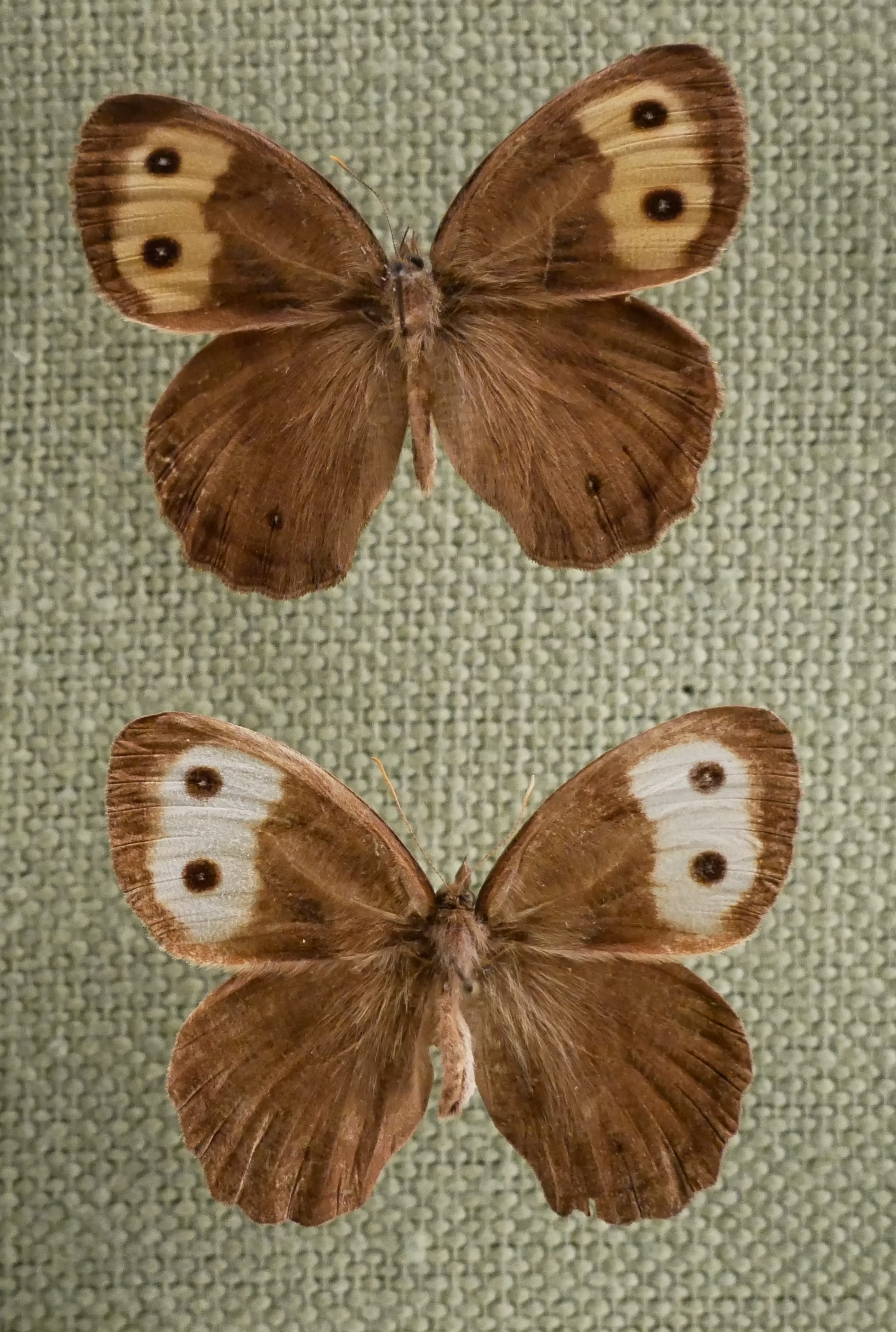
Cercyonis pegala

== Species ==
Listed alphabetically:

- Cercyonis pegala (Fabricius, 1775) – common wood-nymph or large wood-nymph
- Cercyonis meadii (Edwards, 1872) – red-eyed wood-nymph or Mead's wood-nymph
- Cercyonis sthenele (Boisduval, 1852) – Great Basin wood-nymph
- Cercyonis oetus (Boisduval, 1869) – dark wood-nymph or small wood-nymph
