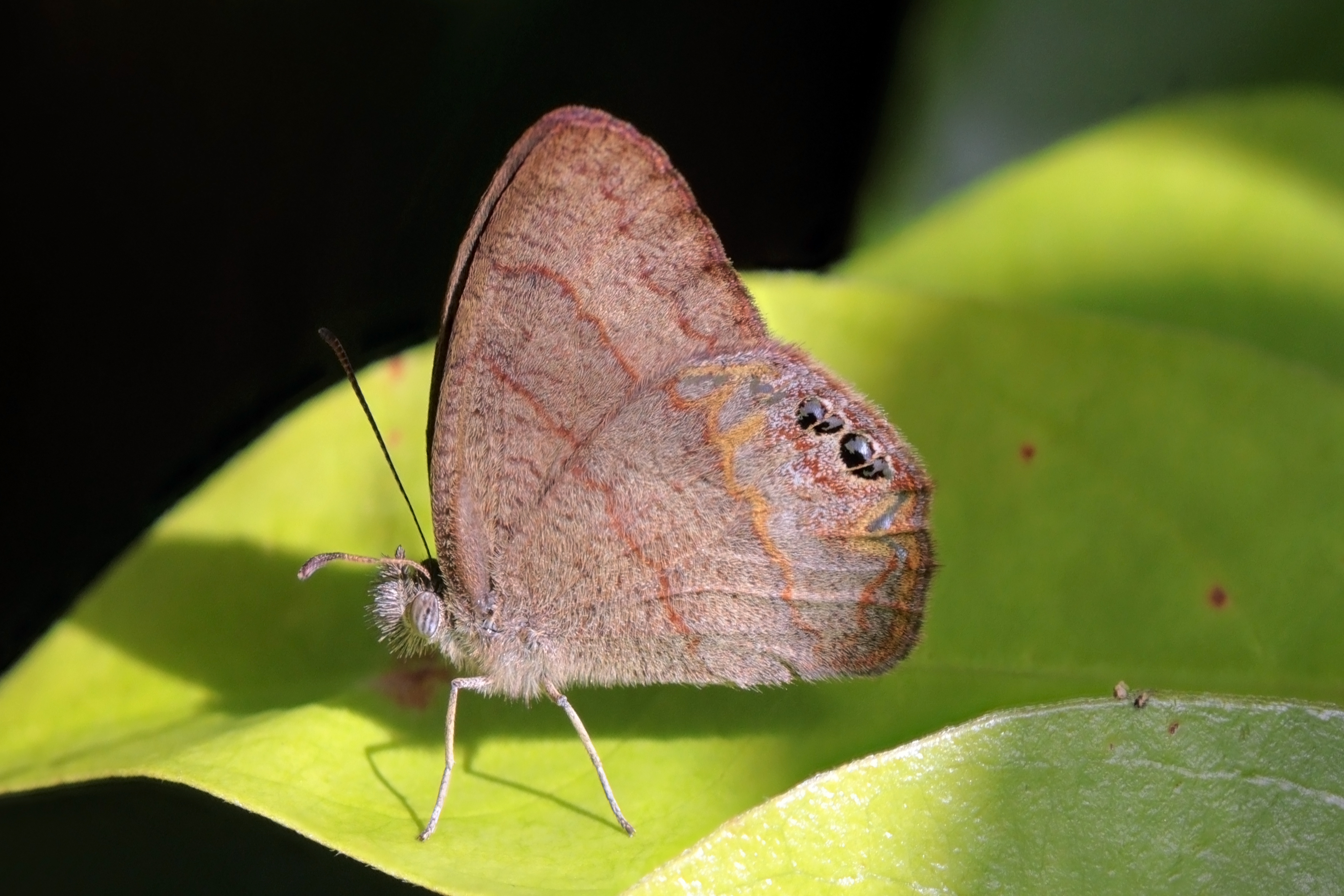
- Cyllopsis pephredo, the big-spiked gemmed-satyr, in Costa Rica

Scientific classification
- Kingdom: Animalia
- Phylum: Arthropoda
- Class: Insecta
- Order: Lepidoptera
- Family: Nymphalidae
- Subfamily: Satyrinae
- Tribe: Satyrini
- Subtribe: Euptychiina
- Genus: Cyllopsis; R. Felder, 1869

= Cyllopsis =

Genus of butterflies

Cyllopsis is a genus of satyrid butterflies found in the Neotropical realm. The genus was erected by Rudolf Felder in 1869.

== Species ==
Listed alphabetically:

- Cyllopsis argentella (Butler & H. Druce, 1872)
- Cyllopsis caballeroi Beutelspacher, 1982
- Cyllopsis clinas (Godman & Salvin, 1889)
- Cyllopsis diazi Miller, 1974
- Cyllopsis dospassosi Miller, [1969]
- Cyllopsis emilia Chacon & Nishida, 2002
- Cyllopsis gemma (Hübner, 1808)
- Cyllopsis guatemalena Miller, 1974
- Cyllopsis hedemanni R. Felder, 1869
- Cyllopsis hilaria (Godman, [1901])
- Cyllopsis jacquelinae Miller, 1974
- Cyllopsis nayarit (Chermock, 1947)
- Cyllopsis nelsoni (Godman & Salvin, [1881])
- Cyllopsis pallens Miller, 1974
- Cyllopsis parvimaculata Miller, 1974
- Cyllopsis pephredo (Godman, [1901])
- Cyllopsis perplexa Miller, 1974
- Cyllopsis pertepida (Dyar, 1912)
- Cyllopsis philodice (Godman & Salvin, 1878)
- Cyllopsis pseudopephredo (Chermock, 1947)
- Cyllopsis pyracmon (Butler, 1867)
- Cyllopsis rogersi (Godman & Salvin, 1878)
- Cyllopsis schausi Miller, 1974
- Cyllopsis steinhauserorum Miller, 1974
- Cyllopsis suivalenoides Miller, 1974
- Cyllopsis suivalens Dyar, 1914
- Cyllopsis tomemmeli Warren & Nakahara, 2018
- Cyllopsis wellingi Miller, 1978
- Cyllopsis whiteorum Miller & Maza, 1984
- Cyllopsis windi Miller, 1974
