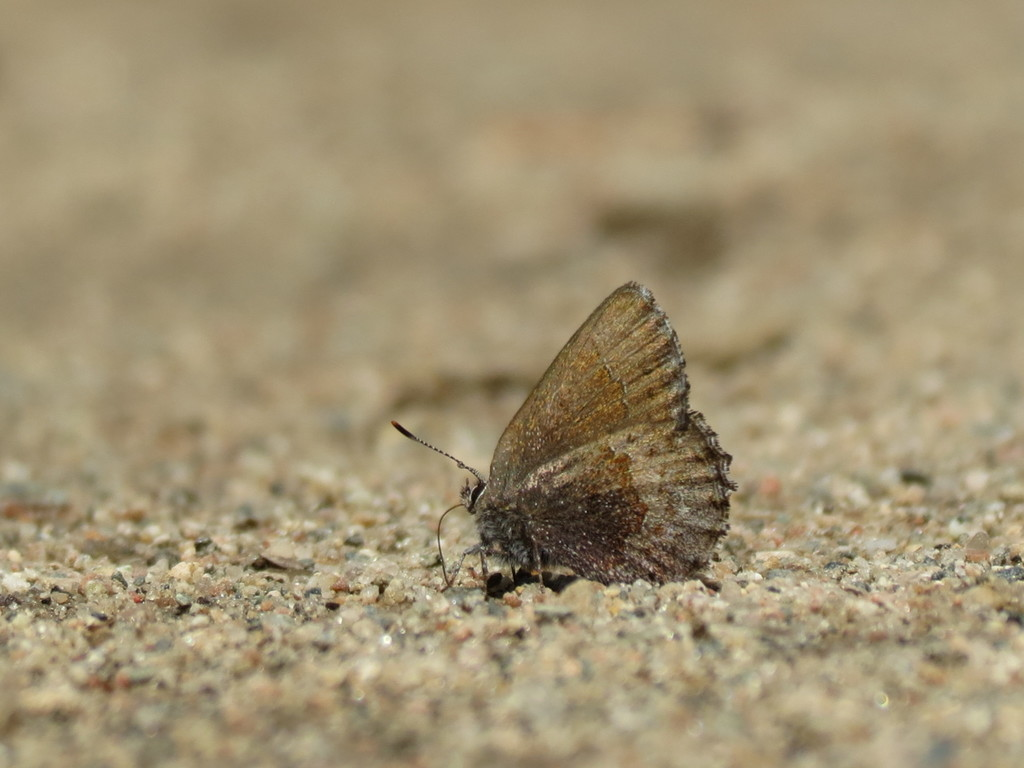

Scientific classification
- Domain: Eukaryota
- Kingdom: Animalia
- Phylum: Arthropoda
- Class: Insecta
- Order: Lepidoptera
- Family: Lycaenidae
- Genus: Callophrys
- Species: C. polios

Binomial name
- Callophrys polios (Cook & Watson, 1907)

Synonyms
- Callophrys polios (Cook & Watson, 1907); Incisalia polios Cook & Watson, 1907; Deciduphagus polios; Incisalia polia; Incisalia polios ab. davisi Watson & W. P. Comstock, 1920

= Callophrys polios =

Hoary elfin

Species of butterfly

Callophrys polios, the hoary elfin, is a butterfly of the family Lycaenidae. It is listed as a species of special concern and believed extirpated in the US state of Connecticut.

The wingspan is 22–29 mm. Adults are on wing from April to June in one generation. The larvae feed on Arctostaphylos uva-ursi and possibly Epigaea repens. The adults feed on flower nectar from various species, including leatherleaf, pyxie, wild strawberry and willow. Hibernation takes place as a chrysalid.

== Subspecies ==
- Callophrys polios polios
- Callophrys polios obscura Ferris & Fisher, 1973 (Colorado)
- Callophrys polios maritima Emmel, Emmel & Mattoon, 1998 (California)

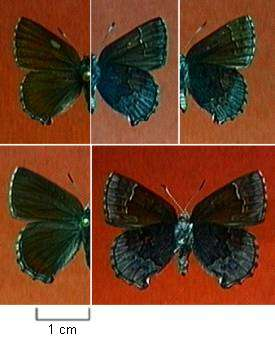
specimens
