= Cercyonis oetus =

- Cercyonis oetus silvestris

Scientific classification
- Kingdom: Animalia
- Phylum: Arthropoda
- Clade: Pancrustacea
- Class: Insecta
- Order: Lepidoptera
- Family: Nymphalidae
- Genus: Cercyonis
- Species: C. oetus

Binomial name
- Cercyonis oetus (Boisduval, 1869)

Synonyms
- Satyrus oetus

Species of butterfly

Cercyonis oetus, the small wood-nymph or dark wood-nymph, is a butterfly of the family Nymphalidae. It is found in western North America.

The wingspan is 32–45 mm. Adults are on wing from June to August in one generation.

The larvae feed on various grasses.

== Subspecies ==
There are four recognized subspecies:

- Cercyonis oetus oetus
- Cercyonis oetus charon (Edwards, 1872)
- Cercyonis oetus silvestris (Edwards, 1861)
- Cercyonis oetus pallescens T. & J. Emmel, 1971
