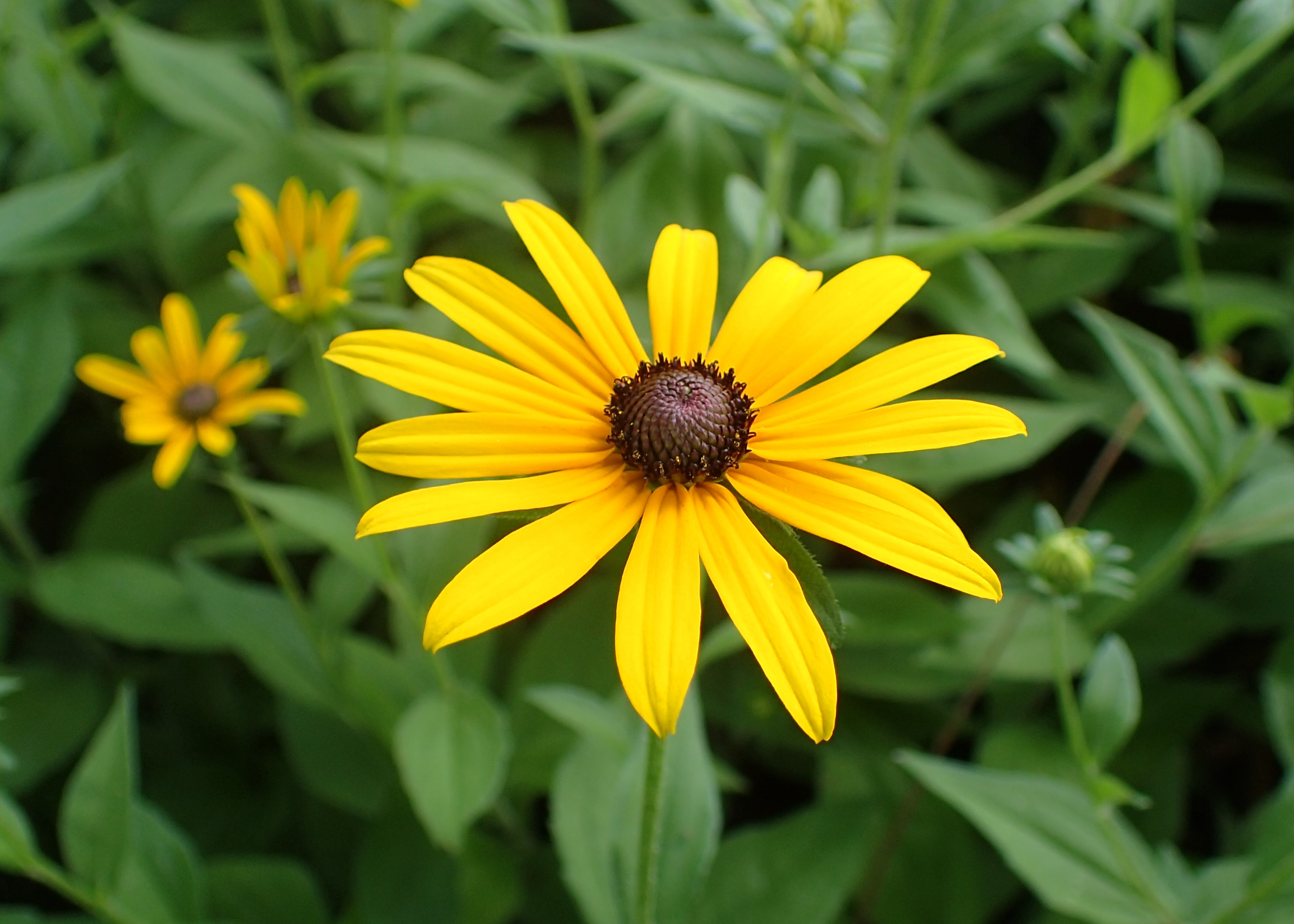
- Rudbeckia hirta flowerhead

Conservation status
- Secure (NatureServe)

Scientific classification
- Kingdom: Plantae
- Clade: Tracheophytes
- Clade: Angiosperms
- Clade: Eudicots
- Clade: Asterids
- Order: Asterales
- Family: Asteraceae
- Tribe: Heliantheae
- Genus: Rudbeckia
- Species: R. hirta

Binomial name
- Rudbeckia hirta L.

Synonyms
- List: Brauneria serotina (Sweet) Bergmans; Centrocarpha gracilis (Nutt.) D.Don ex G.Don; Centrocarpha hirta (L.) D.Don ex G.Don; Coreopsis hirta (L.) Raf.; Helianthus hirtus (L.) E.H.L.Krause; Obeliscotheca flava (T.V.Moore) Nieuwl. & Lunell; Rudbeckia amplectens T.V.Moore; Rudbeckia bicolor Nutt.; Rudbeckia brittonii Small; Rudbeckia discolor Elliott; Rudbeckia divergens T.V.Moore; Rudbeckia flava T.V.Moore; Rudbeckia flexuosa T.V.Moore; Rudbeckia floridana T.V.Moore; Rudbeckia floridana var. angustifolia T.V.Moore; Rudbeckia gracilis Nutt.; Rudbeckia hirta var. annulata Clute; Rudbeckia hirta var. bicolor Clute; Rudbeckia hirta var. brittonii (Small) Fernald; Rudbeckia hirta var. corymbifera Fernald; Rudbeckia hirta f. dichrona Clute; Rudbeckia hirta f. flavescens Clute; Rudbeckia hirta f. gigantea Clute; Rudbeckia hirta f. homochroma Steyerm.; Rudbeckia hirta var. lanceolata (Bisch.) Core; Rudbeckia hirta var. major Hook.; Rudbeckia hirta var. monticola (Small) Fernald; Rudbeckia hirta f. pleniflora Moldenke; Rudbeckia hirta var. rubra Clute; Rudbeckia hirta var. sericea (T.V.Moore) Fernald; Rudbeckia hirta var. serotina (Nutt.) Core; Rudbeckia hirta var. tubuliformis Burnham; Rudbeckia hirta f. viridiflora Burnham; Rudbeckia longipes T.V.Moore; Rudbeckia monticola Small; Rudbeckia sericea T.V.Moore; Rudbeckia serotina Nutt.; Rudbeckia serotina f. annulata (Clute) Fernald & B.G.Schub.; Rudbeckia serotina var. corymbifera (Fernald) Fernald & B.G.Schub.; Rudbeckia serotina f. dichrona (Clute) Moldenke; Rudbeckia serotina f. flavescens (Clute) Moldenke; Rudbeckia serotina f. frondosa (Clute) Moldenke; Rudbeckia serotina f. gigantea (Clute) Moldenke; Rudbeckia serotina f. homochroma (Steyerm.) Fernald & B.G.Schub.; Rudbeckia serotina var. lanceolata (Bisch.) Fernald & B.G.Schub.; Rudbeckia serotina f. novae-caesareae Oswald; Rudbeckia serotina f. pleniflora (Moldenke) Fernald & B.G.Schub.; Rudbeckia serotina f. pulcherrima (Farw.) Fernald & B.G.Schub.; Rudbeckia serotina f. rubra (Clute) Fernald & B.G.Schub.; Rudbeckia serotina var. sericea (T.V.Moore) Fernald & B.G.Schub.; Rudbeckia serotina f. tubuliformis (Burnham) Fernald & B.G.Schub.; Rudbeckia serotina f. viridiflora (Burnham) Fernald & B.G.Schub.; Rudbeckia strigosa Nutt.

= Rudbeckia hirta =

Species of flowering plant

Rudbeckia hirta, commonly called black-eyed Susan and yellow coneflower, is a North American flowering plant in the family Asteraceae. It grows to 1 metre (3 1/2 ft) tall with daisy-like yellow flower heads. There are numerous cultivars. It was used medicinally by Native Americans and is the state flower of Maryland.

== Description ==
Rudbeckia hirta is an upright annual (sometimes biennial or perennial) growing 30–100 cm (12–39 in) tall by 30–45 cm (12–18 in) wide. It has alternate, mostly basal leaves 10–18 cm long, covered by coarse hair, with stout branching stems and daisy-like, composite flower heads appearing in late summer and early autumn. In the species, the flowers are up to 10 cm (4 in) in diameter, with yellow ray florets circling conspicuous brown or black, dome-shaped cone of many small disc florets. However, extensive breeding has produced a range of sizes and colours, including oranges, reds and browns.

== Taxonomy ==
=== Varieties ===
There are four varieties

- Rudbeckia hirta var. angustifolia – southeastern + south-central United States (South Carolina to Texas)
- Rudbeckia hirta var. floridana – Florida
- Rudbeckia hirta var. hirta – Eastern United States (Maine to Alabama).
- Rudbeckia hirta var. pulcherrima – Widespread in most of North America (Newfoundland to British Columbia, south to Alabama and New Mexico; naturalized Washington to California).

=== Etymology ===
The specific epithet hirta is Latin for "hairy", and refers to the trichomes occurring on leaves and stems. Other common names for this plant include: brown-eyed Susan, brown betty, gloriosa daisy, golden Jerusalem, English bull's eye, poor-land daisy, yellow daisy, and yellow ox-eye daisy.

== Distribution and habitat ==
It is native to eastern and central North America, and is naturalized in the west, being found in all 10 Canadian Provinces and all 48 states of the contiguous United States. It is also naturalized in China.

== Ecology ==
Butterflies are attracted to Rudbeckia hirta. It is a larval host to the bordered patch, gorgone checkerspot, and silvery checkerspot species.

Dragonflies, voracious eaters of mosquitoes, are attracted by the tiny pollinators of these flowers.

Rudbeckia hirta is insect pollinated and is recorded to have been visited in northern Florida by Halictus poeyi/ligatus and Megachile petulans.

== Cultivation ==
Rudbeckia hirta is widely cultivated in parks and gardens, for summer bedding schemes, borders, containers, wildflower gardens, prairie-style plantings and cut flowers. Numerous cultivars have been developed, of which 'Indian Summer' and 'Toto' have gained the Royal Horticultural Society's Award of Garden Merit. Other popular cultivars include 'Double Gold' and 'Marmalade'.

Gloriosa daisies are tetraploid cultivars having much larger flower heads than the wild species, often doubled or with contrasting markings on the ray florets. They were first bred by Alfred Blakeslee of Smith College by applying colchicine to R. hirta seeds; Blakeslee's stock was further developed by W. Atlee Burpee and introduced to commerce at the 1957 Philadelphia Flower Show. Gloriosa daisies are generally treated as annuals or short-lived perennials and are typically grown from seed, though there are some named cultivars.

== Uses ==
The plant is thought to be a Native American medicine for various ailments. The roots, though not the seedheads, can be used much like the related Echinacea purpurea with unsubstantiated claims to boost immunity and fight colds, flu and infections. The Ojibwa people used it as a poultice for snake bites and to make an infusion for treating colds and worms in children.

== In culture ==
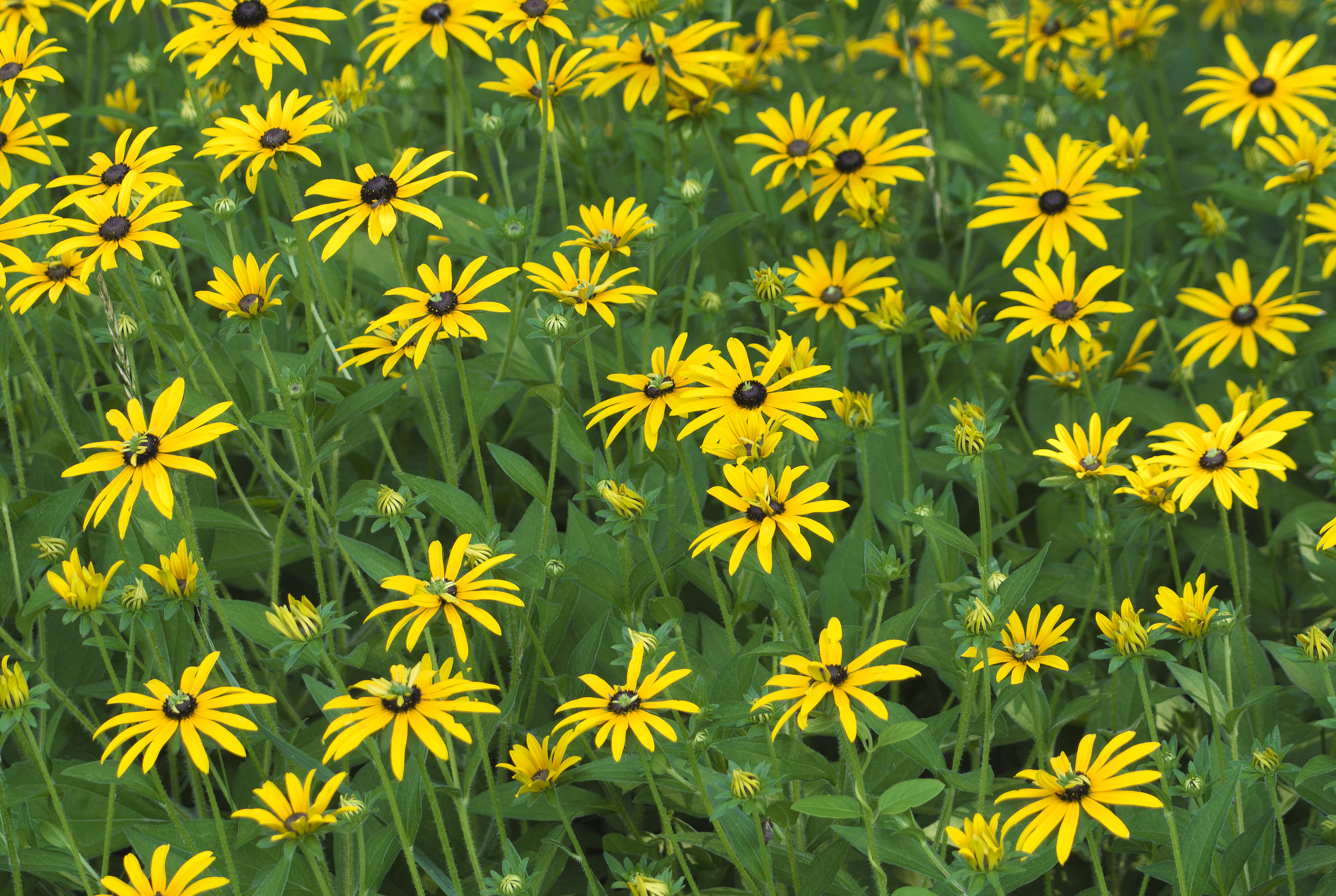
Black-eyed Susan flowers beside a road

The black-eyed Susan was designated as the state flower of Maryland in 1918. In this capacity it is used in gardens and ceremonies to celebrate, memorialize and show affection for the state of Maryland and its people. The Preakness Stakes in Baltimore, Maryland, has been termed "The Run for the Black-Eyed Susans" because a blanket of Viking Poms, a variety of chrysanthemums resembling black-eyed Susans, is traditionally placed around the winning horse's neck. (Actual black-eyed Susans are not in bloom in May during the Preakness.)

In 1912, the black-eyed Susan became the inspiration for the University of Southern Mississippi school colors (black and gold), suggested by Florence Burrow Pope, a member of the university's first graduating class. According to Pope:

On a trip home, I saw great masses of Black-Eyed Susans in the pine forests. I decided to encourage my senior class to gather Black-Eyed Susans to spell out the name of the class on sheets to be displayed during exercises on Class Day. I then suggested black and gold as class colors, and my suggestion was adopted.

== Gallery ==
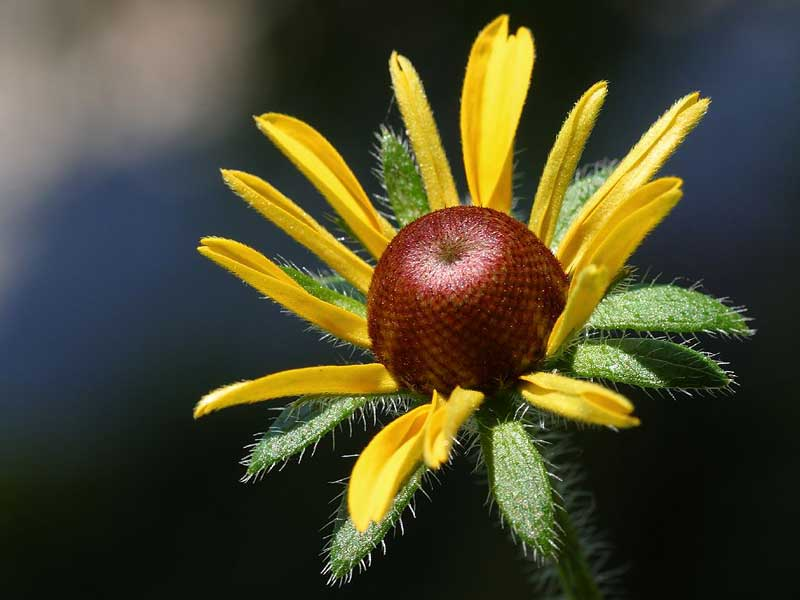
Inflorescence and involucral bracts

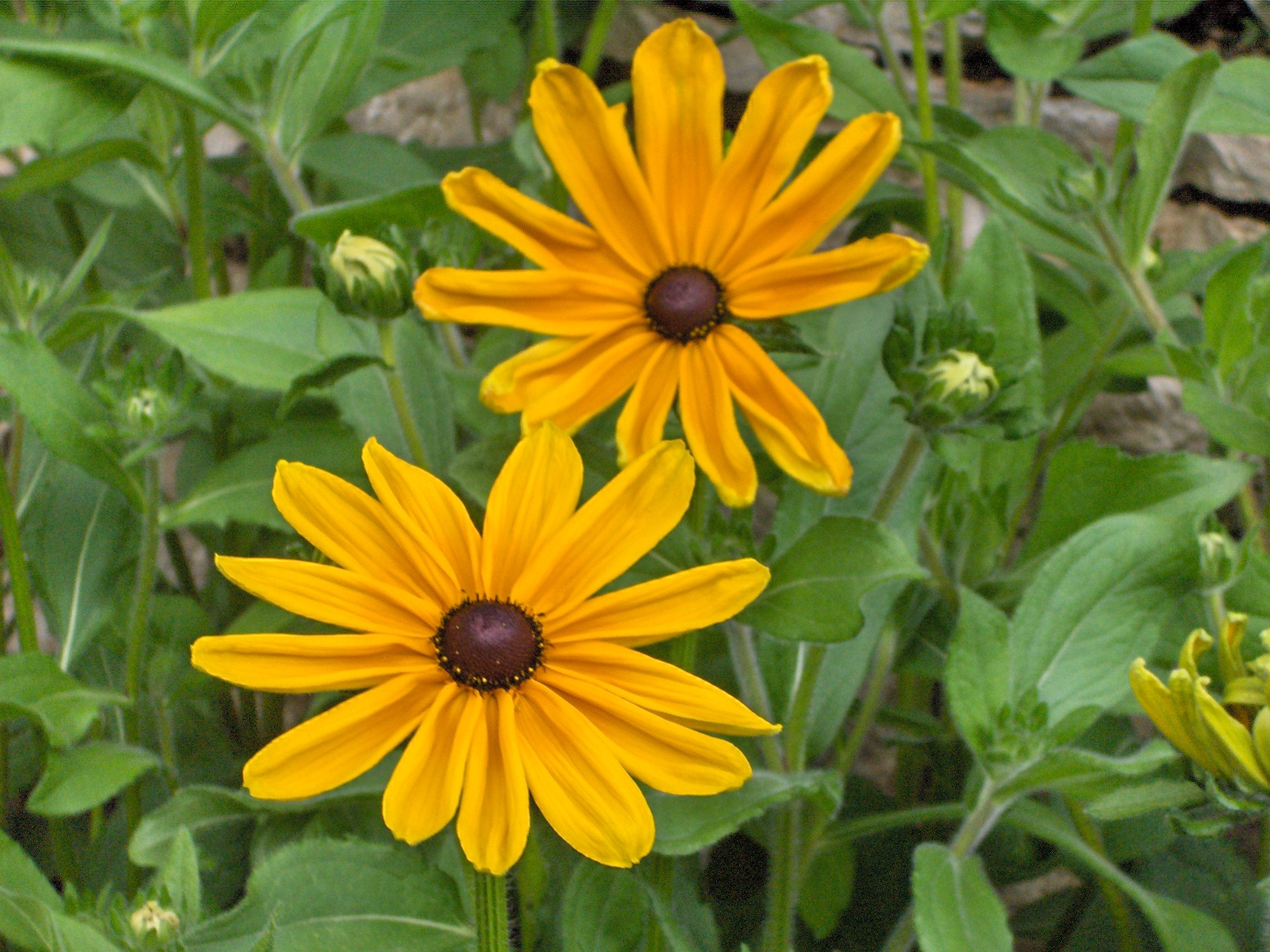
Rudbeckia hirta 'Indian Summer'

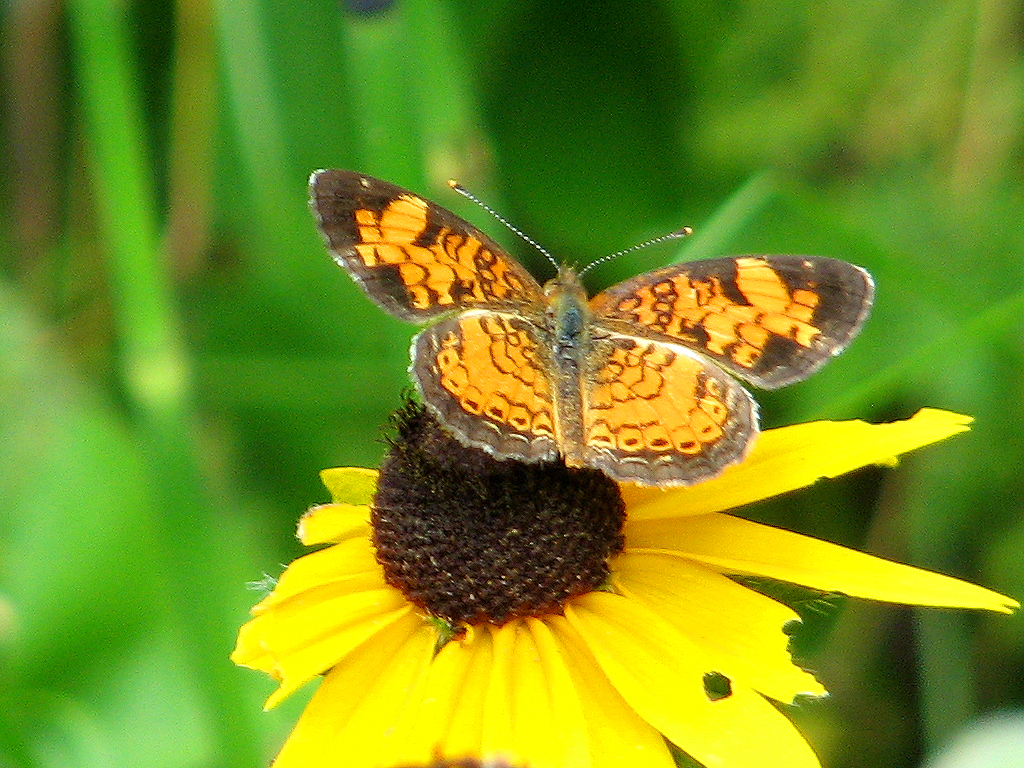
Phyciodes cocyta butterfly

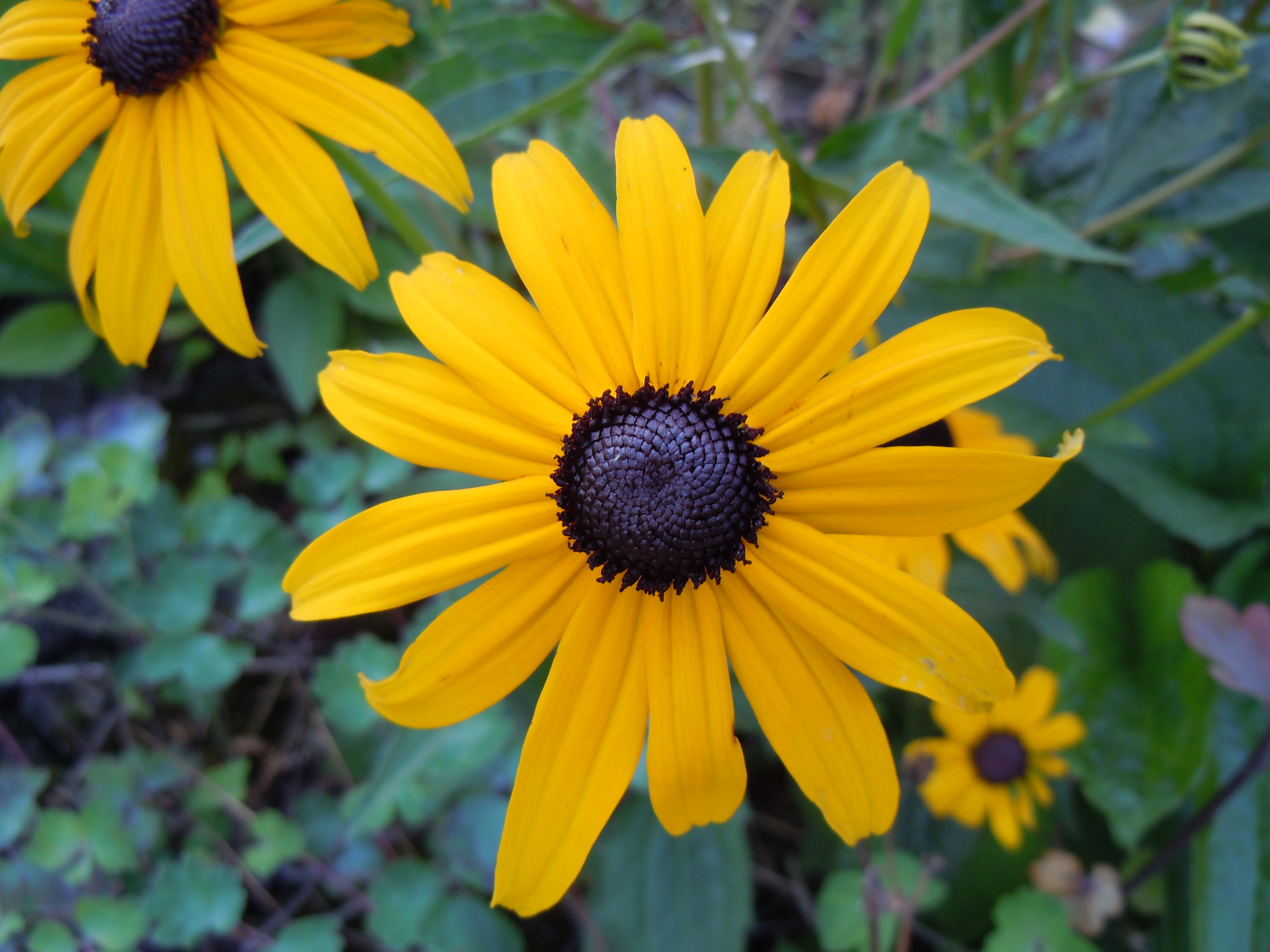
In a German front garden
