= M. ehrenbergii =

M. ehrenbergii may refer to:

- Manta ehrenbergii, an eagle ray
- Morpheis ehrenbergii, a Mexican butterfly
