= C. ehrenbergii =

C. ehrenbergii may refer to:

- Canna ehrenbergii, a garden plant
- Chlidanthus ehrenbergii, a South American plant
- Chlosyne ehrenbergii, a Mexican butterfly
- Closterium ehrenbergii, a cylindrical algae
- Croton ehrenbergii, a medicinal plant
- Cylindrocarpon ehrenbergii, a plant pathogen

== See also ==
- C. ehrenbergi (disambiguation)
