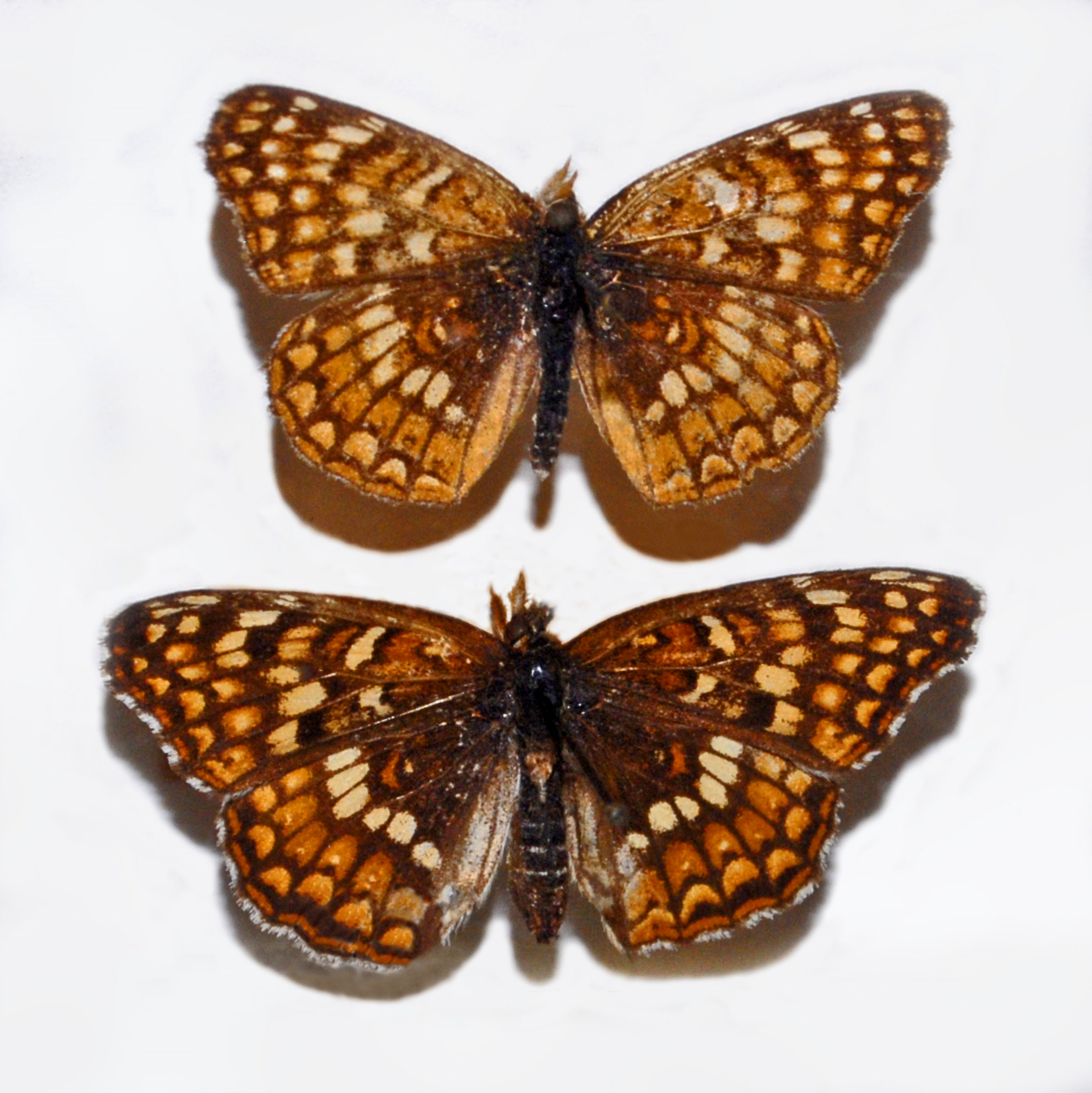

Scientific classification
- Domain: Eukaryota
- Kingdom: Animalia
- Phylum: Arthropoda
- Class: Insecta
- Order: Lepidoptera
- Family: Nymphalidae
- Genus: Chlosyne
- Species: C. gabbii

Binomial name
- Chlosyne gabbii (Behr, 1863)

Synonyms
- Melitaea gabbii Behr, 1863; Melitaea pola Boisduval, 1869; Melitaea sonorae Boisduval, 1869; Euphydryas gabbii ab. pasadenae Gunder, 1924; Melitaea gabbii ab. gunderi Comstock, 1926; Melitaea gabbii ab. newcombi Comstock, 1926

= Chlosyne gabbii =

Gabb's checkerspot

Species of insect

Chlosyne gabbii, or Gabb's checkerspot, is a butterfly from the family Nymphalidae.

== Subspecies ==
- Chlosyne gabbii gabbii
- Chlosyne gabbii atrifasciata Emmel & Mattoon, 1998

== Description ==
Chlosyne gabbii has a wingspan of about 32–45 millimetres (1.3–1.8 in). The upperside of the wings is checkered with bright orange-brown and black, while the underside of hindwing shows pearly-white spots. Females are lighter than the males. Adults can be encountered from May to July.

Larvae feed on Corethrogyne filaginifolia, Heterotheca grandiflora and Haplopappus squarrosus.

== Distribution ==
This very rare species can be found in California in the western United States. It is threatened throughout its range.
