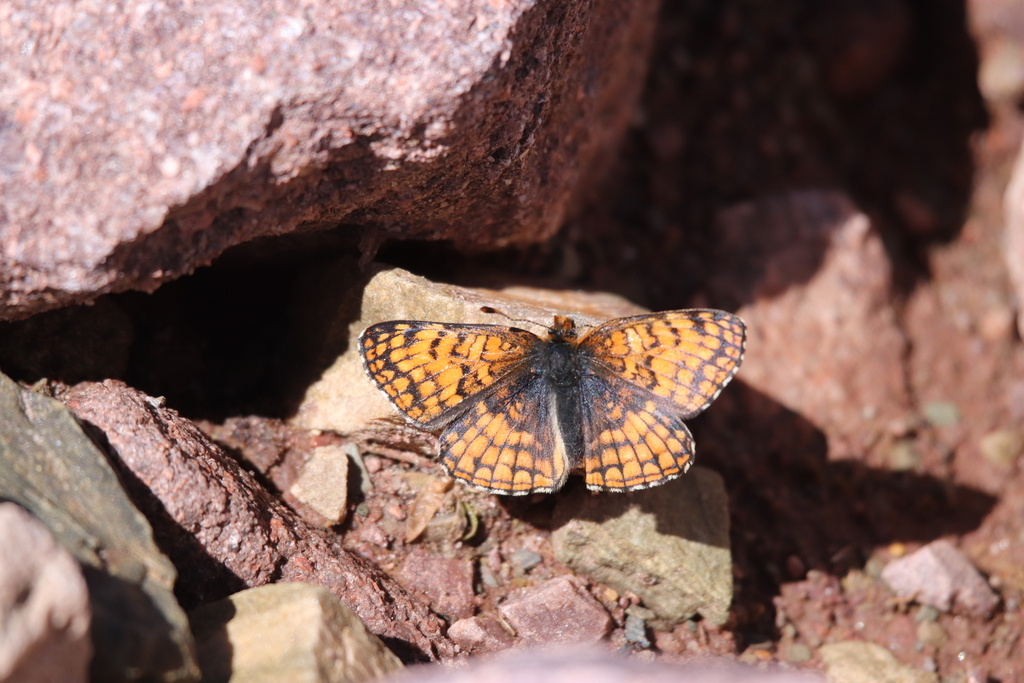

Scientific classification
- Domain: Eukaryota
- Kingdom: Animalia
- Phylum: Arthropoda
- Class: Insecta
- Order: Lepidoptera
- Family: Nymphalidae
- Genus: Chlosyne
- Species: C. whitneyi
- Subspecies: C. w. damoetas

Trinomial name
- Chlosyne whitneyi damoetas (Skinner, 1902)

Synonyms
- Melitaea damoetas Skinner, 1902; Chlosyne whitneyi malcolmi Comstock, 1926; Melitaea damoeteas ab. damoetella McDunnough, 1927 (Unav.); Chlosyne whitneyi windriver Scott, 1998; Chlosyne whitneyi altalus Scott, 1998

= Chlosyne whitneyi damoetas =

Rockslide checkerspot

Subspecies of butterfly

Chlosyne whitneyi damoetas, the rockslide checkerspot, is a butterfly of the family Nymphalidae that is found in North America, from British Columbia and Alberta to Wyoming and Colorado.

== Life cycle ==
The caterpillar of this species feeds on Erigeron leiomerus and Solidago multiradiata.
