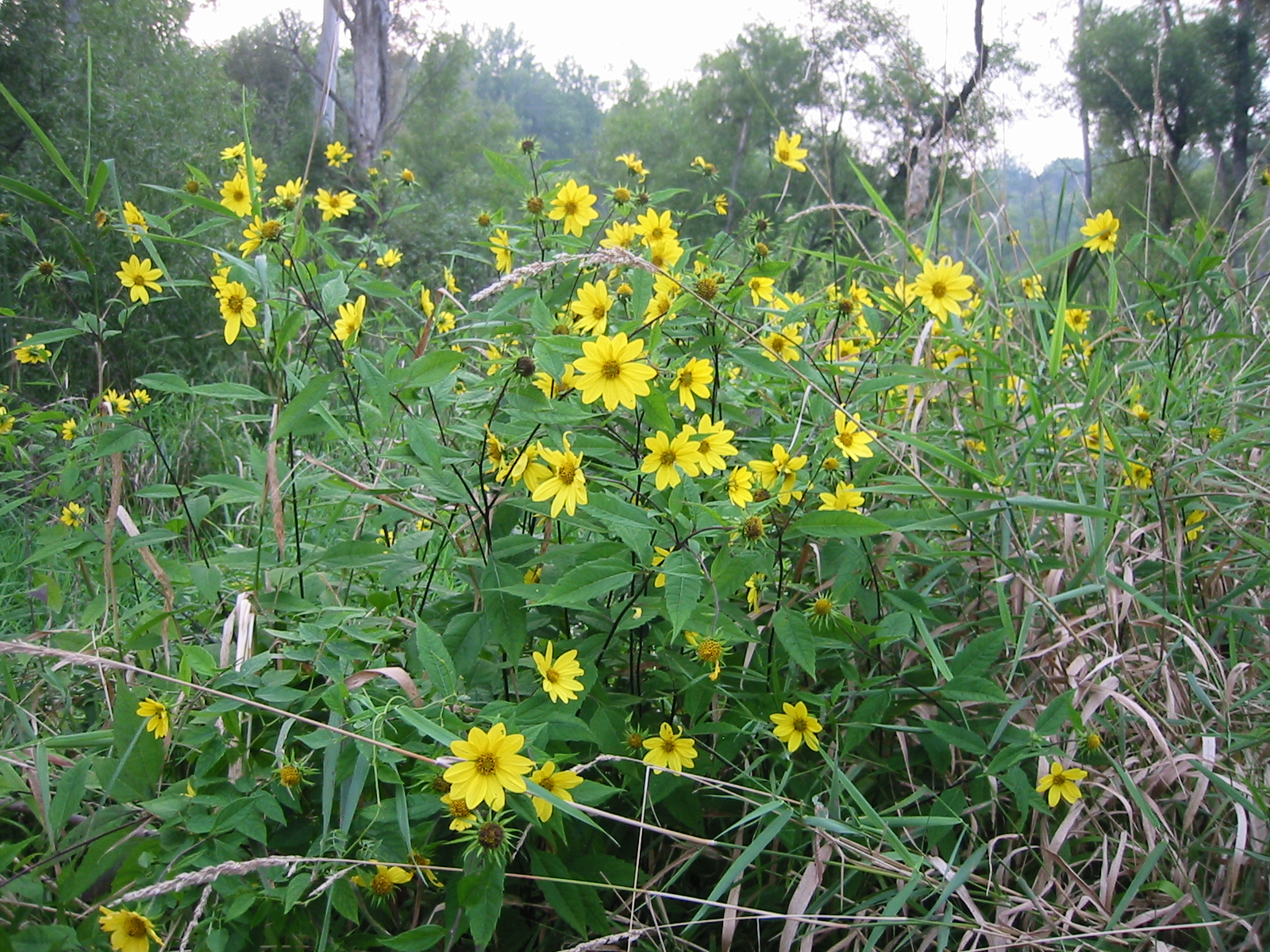

Scientific classification
- Kingdom: Plantae
- Clade: Tracheophytes
- Clade: Angiosperms
- Clade: Eudicots
- Clade: Asterids
- Order: Asterales
- Family: Asteraceae
- Genus: Helianthus
- Species: H. microcephalus

Binomial name
- Helianthus microcephalus Torr. & Gray

Synonyms
- Helianthus pallidus (Elliot) Farw. Helianthus parviflorus Bernh. ex Spreng.

= Helianthus microcephalus =

Species of sunflower

Helianthus microcephalus is a perennial species of Helianthus also known as small woodland sunflower or small-wood sunflower or small-head sunflower or simply as woodland sunflower. It is a native of Northern America, and is to be found growing in open woodlands and along roadsides. It is a host plant for the American painted lady, painted lady, and spring azure butterflies. It is also a larval host plant for the silvery checkerspot butterfly.
