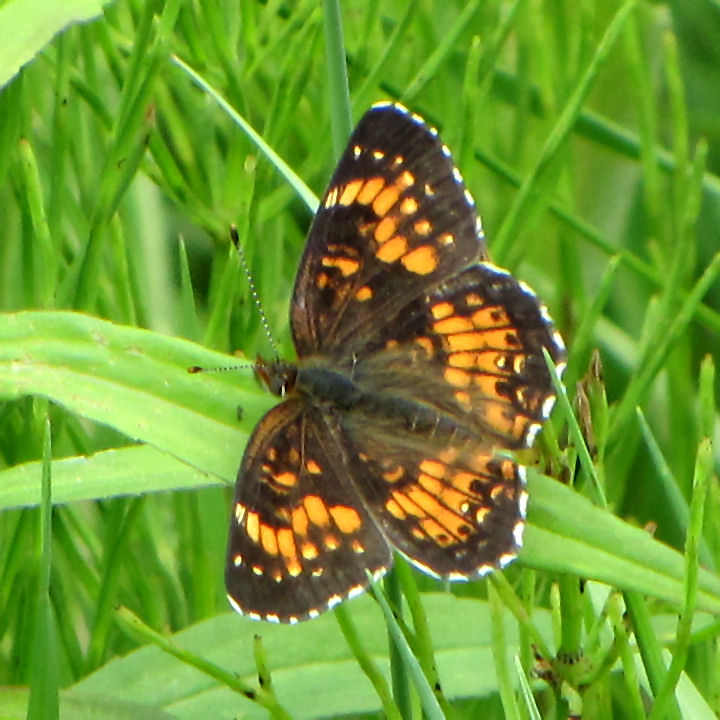

Scientific classification
- Kingdom: Animalia
- Phylum: Arthropoda
- Class: Insecta
- Order: Lepidoptera
- Family: Nymphalidae
- Genus: Chlosyne
- Species: C. harrisii

Binomial name
- Chlosyne harrisii (Scudder, 1864)

= Chlosyne harrisii =

Harris's checkerspot

Species of butterfly

Chlosyne harrisii, or Harris's checkerspot, is a member of the family Nymphalidae that is found in North America. They range from the Canadian Atlantic provinces, excluding Newfoundland and Labrador, to Manitoba and North Dakota south to West Virginia and Ohio. They can often be seen in bogs, meadows and almost anywhere else its host plant occurs. The typical elevations for this species range from 0 to 1,742 feet (531 m). It is listed as a species of special concern and believed extirpated in the US state of Connecticut.

== Description ==
The adult is often confused with another member of the same genus, the silvery checkerspot (Chlosyne nycteis). The adult's wingspan is 3.6–5.1 cm. The upperside of the wing is orange with black markings. The underside of the wing has a single red-orange stripe and a reddish-orange, white and black marked pattern on the rest of the hindwing.

== Life cycle ==
There is one flight which occurs between June and July. The caterpillar of this species feeds on the flat-topped white aster (Aster umbellatus) while adults feed on flower nectar. The female lays eggs in a cluster formation under the leaves of its host plants. The caterpillar overwinters during its third instar.
