= Dichomeris baxa =

Scientific classification
- Kingdom: Animalia
- Phylum: Arthropoda
- Clade: Pancrustacea
- Class: Insecta
- Order: Lepidoptera
- Family: Gelechiidae
- Genus: Dichomeris
- Species: D. baxa

Binomial name
- Dichomeris baxa Hodges, 1986

Species of moth

Dichomeris baxa is a moth in the family Gelechiidae. It was described by Ronald W. Hodges in 1986. It is found in North America, where it has been recorded from California.

Adults have been recorded on wing from April to July and again in October.

The larvae feed on Corethrogyne filaginifolia.
