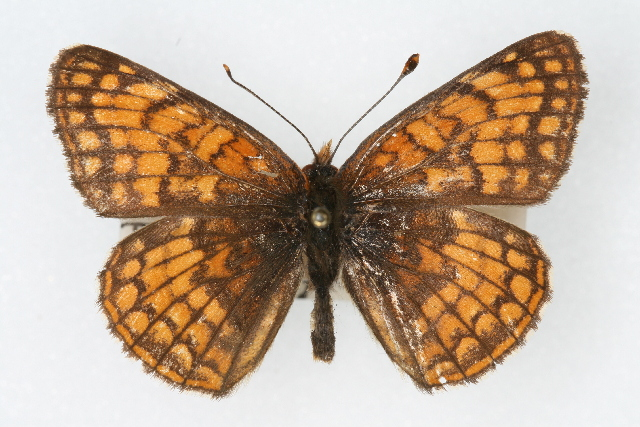

Scientific classification
- Domain: Eukaryota
- Kingdom: Animalia
- Phylum: Arthropoda
- Class: Insecta
- Order: Lepidoptera
- Family: Nymphalidae
- Genus: Chlosyne
- Species: C. whitneyi

Binomial name
- Chlosyne whitneyi (Behr, 1863)

Synonyms
- Melitaea whitneyi Behr, 1863; Melitaea damoetas Skinner, 1902; Chlosyne whitneyi malcolmi Comstock, 1926

= Chlosyne whitneyi =

Species of insect

Chlosyne whitneyi, the rockslide checkerspot or Sierra Nevada checkerspot, is a butterfly of the family Nymphalidae. It is found in western North America from British Columbia and Alberta south, in the mountains, to California and Colorado.

== Description ==
The wingspan is 32–41 mm. Adults are on wing from July to August in one generation per year. Its habitats include alpine rockslides and scree slopes.

The larvae feed on various species in the sunflower family including Erigeron and Solidago species.

=== Subspecies ===
- Chlosyne whitneyi damoetas (Skinner, 1902)
- Chlosyne whitneyi whitneyi
