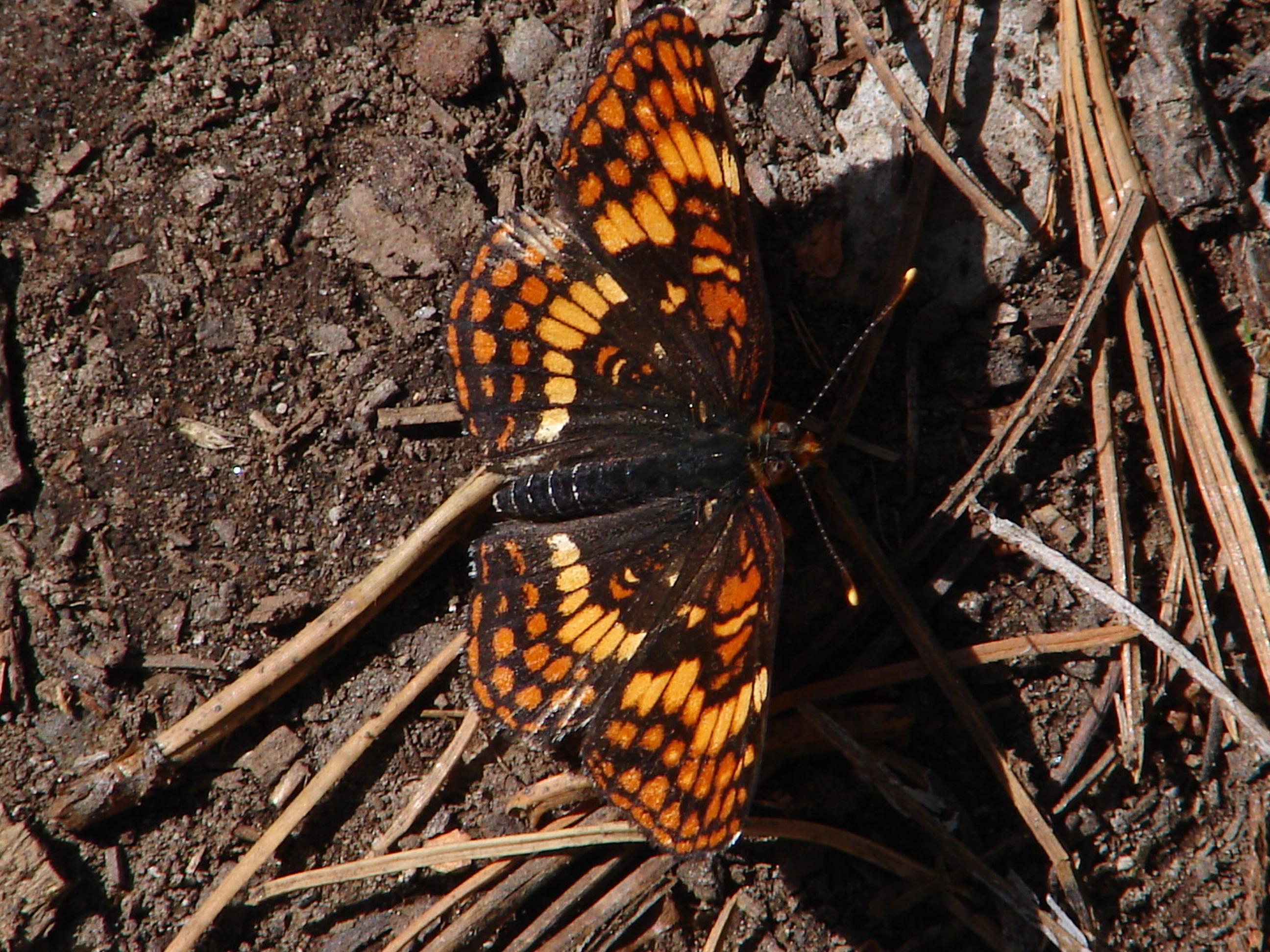

Scientific classification
- Domain: Eukaryota
- Kingdom: Animalia
- Phylum: Arthropoda
- Class: Insecta
- Order: Lepidoptera
- Family: Nymphalidae
- Genus: Chlosyne
- Species: C. hoffmanni

Binomial name
- Chlosyne hoffmanni (Behr, 1863)

Synonyms
- Melitaea hoffmanni Behr, 1863; Melitaea helicta Boisduval, 1869; Lemonias hoffmanni Dyar, 1903; Charidryas hoffmanni

= Chlosyne hoffmanni =

Hoffmann's checkerspot

Species of insect

Chlosyne hoffmanni, or Hoffmann's checkerspot, is a butterfly of the family Nymphalidae that is found in western North America. They range from the Sierra Nevada and Cascade Mountains in the U.S. to Manning Park in British Columbia.

== Description ==
The adult may be often confused with the northern checkerspot (C. palla) and sagebrush checkerspot (C. acastus). The adult's wingspan is 30–36 mm (1.2–1.4 in).

== Life cycle ==
There is one flight that occurs between June and early July in Canada. The caterpillar of this species feeds on Aster species. Adults feed on flower nectar.

== Subspecies ==
- C. h. manchada Bauer, [1960]
- C. h. segregata Barnes & McDunnough, 1918
