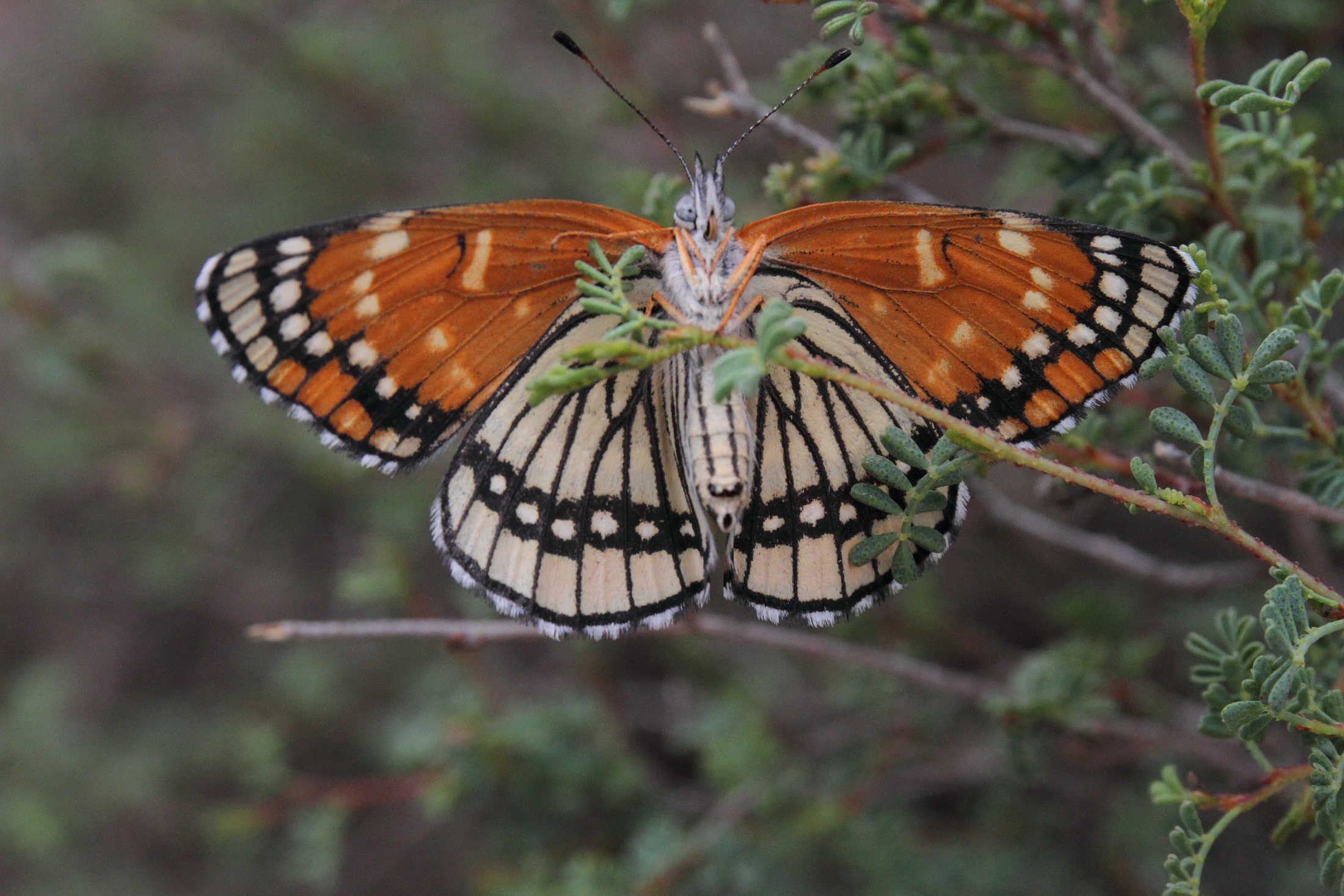

Scientific classification
- Kingdom: Animalia
- Phylum: Arthropoda
- Clade: Pancrustacea
- Class: Insecta
- Order: Lepidoptera
- Family: Nymphalidae
- Subtribe: Chlosynina
- Genus: Chlosyne
- Species: C. cyneas

Binomial name
- Chlosyne cyneas (Godman & Osbert Salvin, 1878)

= Chlosyne cyneas =

Species of butterfly

Chlosyne cyneas, the black checkerspot, is a species of butterfly in the family Nymphalidae.
