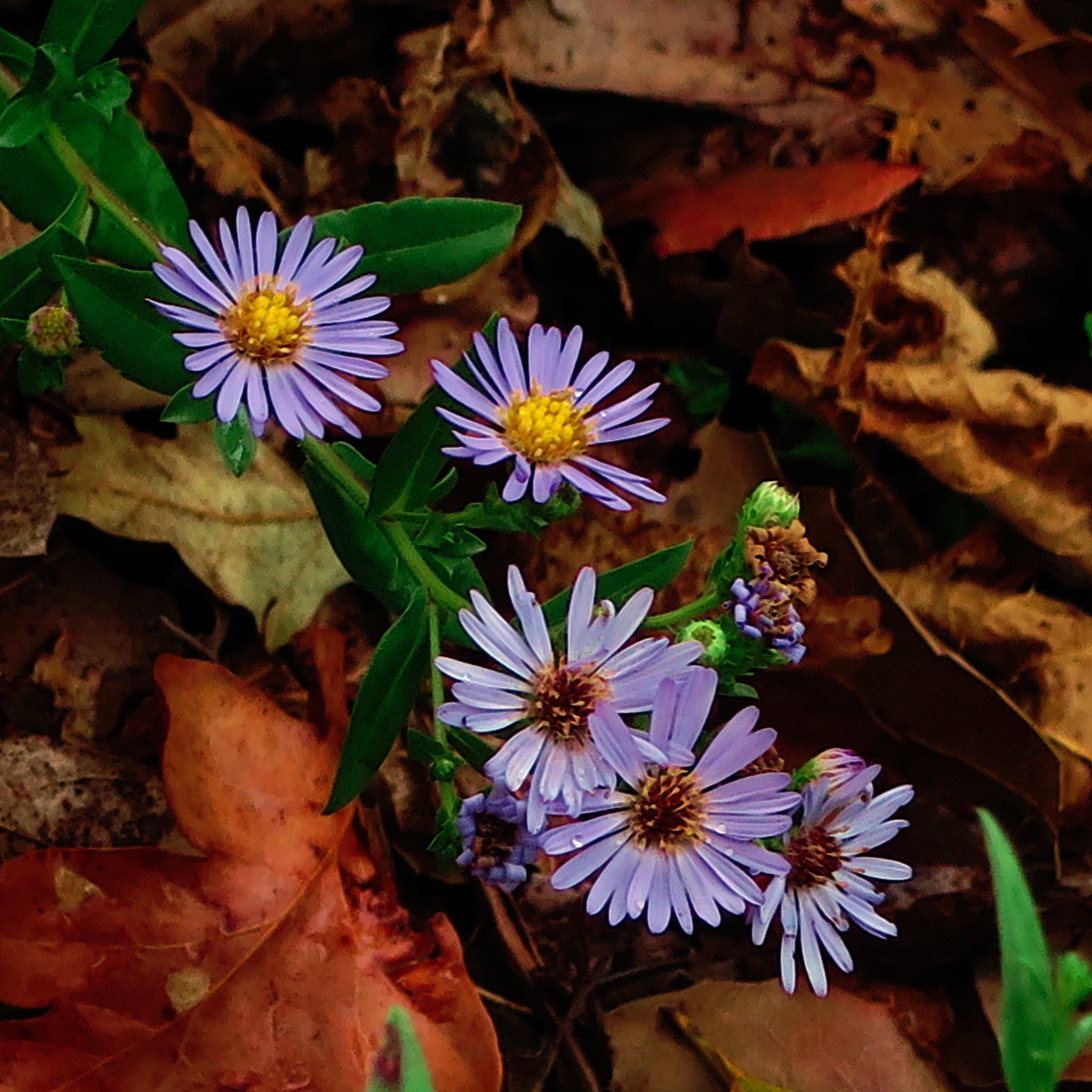

Conservation status
- Secure (NatureServe)

Scientific classification
- Kingdom: Plantae
- Clade: Tracheophytes
- Clade: Angiosperms
- Clade: Eudicots
- Clade: Asterids
- Order: Asterales
- Family: Asteraceae
- Tribe: Astereae
- Subtribe: Symphyotrichinae
- Genus: Symphyotrichum
- Subgenus: Symphyotrichum subg. Symphyotrichum
- Section: Symphyotrichum sect. Occidentales
- Species: S. chilense

Binomial name
- Symphyotrichum chilense (Nees) G.L.Nesom
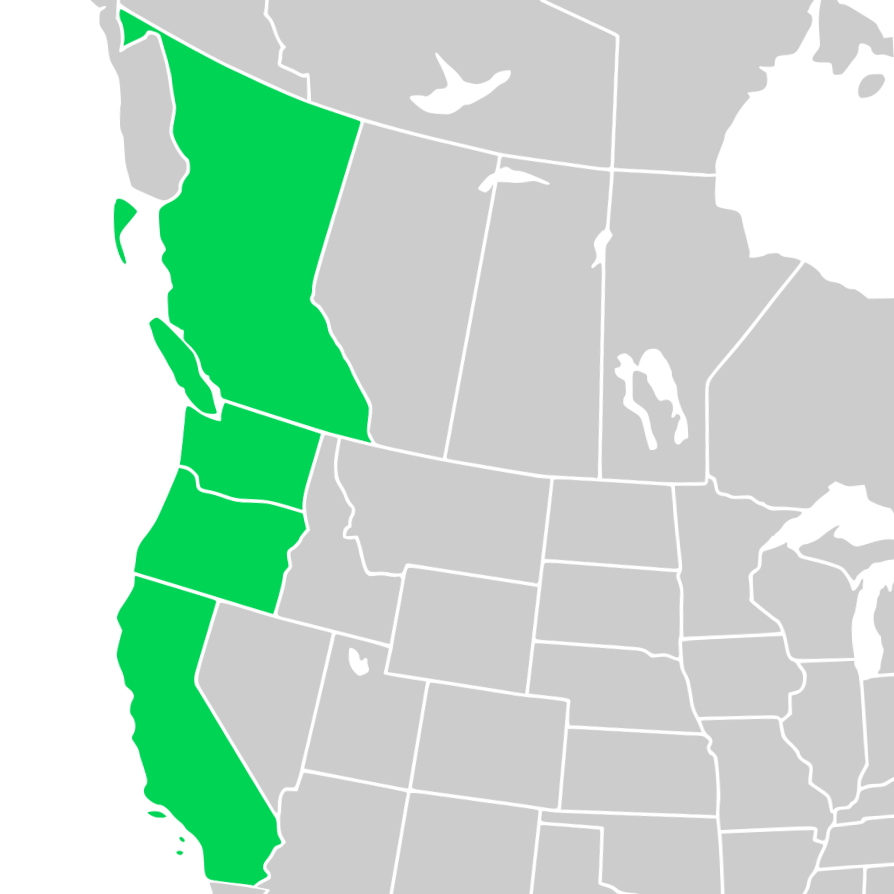
- Native distribution

Synonyms
- Basionym: Aster chilensis Nees; Alphabetical list: Aster chamissonis A.Gray; Aster chilensis var. invenustus (Greene) Jeps.; Aster chilensis var. medius Jeps.; Aster chilensis var. sonomensis (Greene) Jeps.; Aster chilensis subsp. typicus Cronquist; Aster invenustus Greene; Aster neesii Sch.Bip.; Aster radula Less.; Aster sonomensis Greene; Aster spectabilis Hook. & Arn.; Symphyotrichum chilense var. invenustum (Greene) G.L.Nesom; Symphyotrichum chilense var. medium (Jeps.) G.L.Nesom

= Symphyotrichum chilense =

Species of plant in the aster family

Symphyotrichum chilense (formerly Aster chilensis) is a species of flowering plant in the family Asteraceae known by the common names Pacific aster and common California aster. It is native to the west coast of North America from British Columbia to Southern California and the Channel Islands. It grows in many habitats, especially along the coast and in the coastal mountain ranges. Despite its scientific name, it does not occur in Chile. Pacific aster blooms from June to October with violet ray florets surrounding yellow disk florets. Note that Corethrogyne filaginifolia shares its common name of California aster.

== Description ==
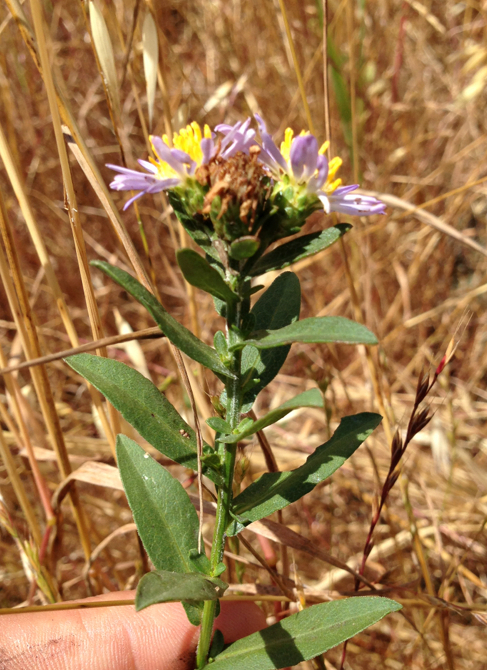
Part of an inflorescence of S. chilense

Symphyotrichum chilense is a rhizomatous, perennial, herbaceous plant growing to heights between 40 and 120 centimeters (1 1/4 and 4 feet). The sparsely hairy leaves are narrowly oval-shaped, pointed, and sometimes finely serrated along the edges. The inflorescence holds flower heads that open June–October with centers of 35–60+ yellow disk florets surrounded by 15–40 narrow violet ray florets. The fruit is a seed, specifically a rounded, hairy cypsela with pappi.

== Distribution and habitat ==
Pacific aster is native to west coast provinces and states of North America in British Columbia; California, including Southern California and the Channel Islands; Oregon; and, Washington. Despite its scientific name, it does not occur in Chile.

It can be found in coastal habitats including salt marshes, ocean dunes and banks, grasslands, and coniferous forests, at elevations of 0–500 meters (0–1,600 feet).
