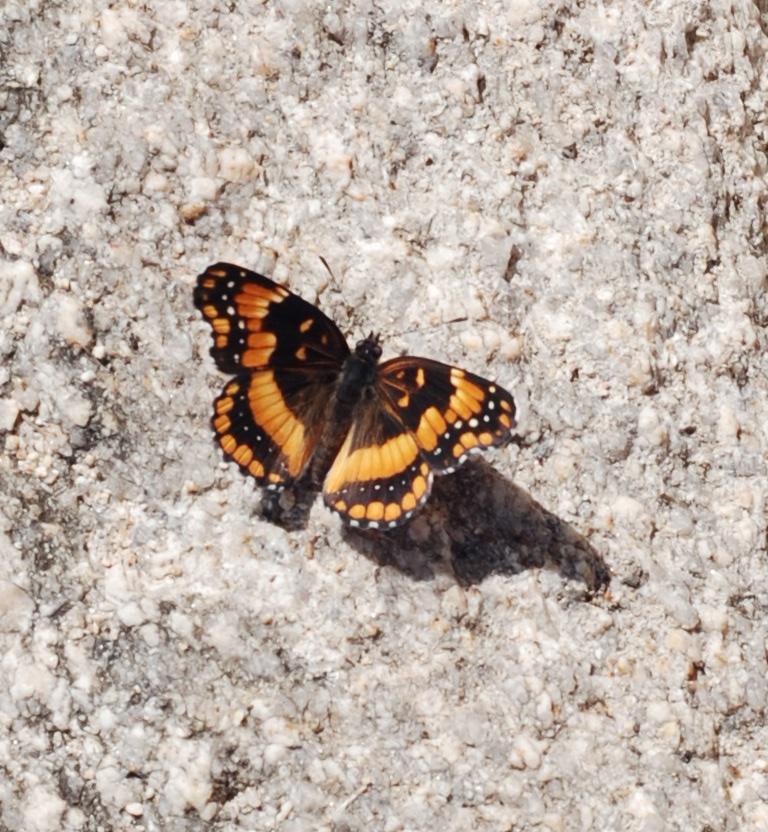

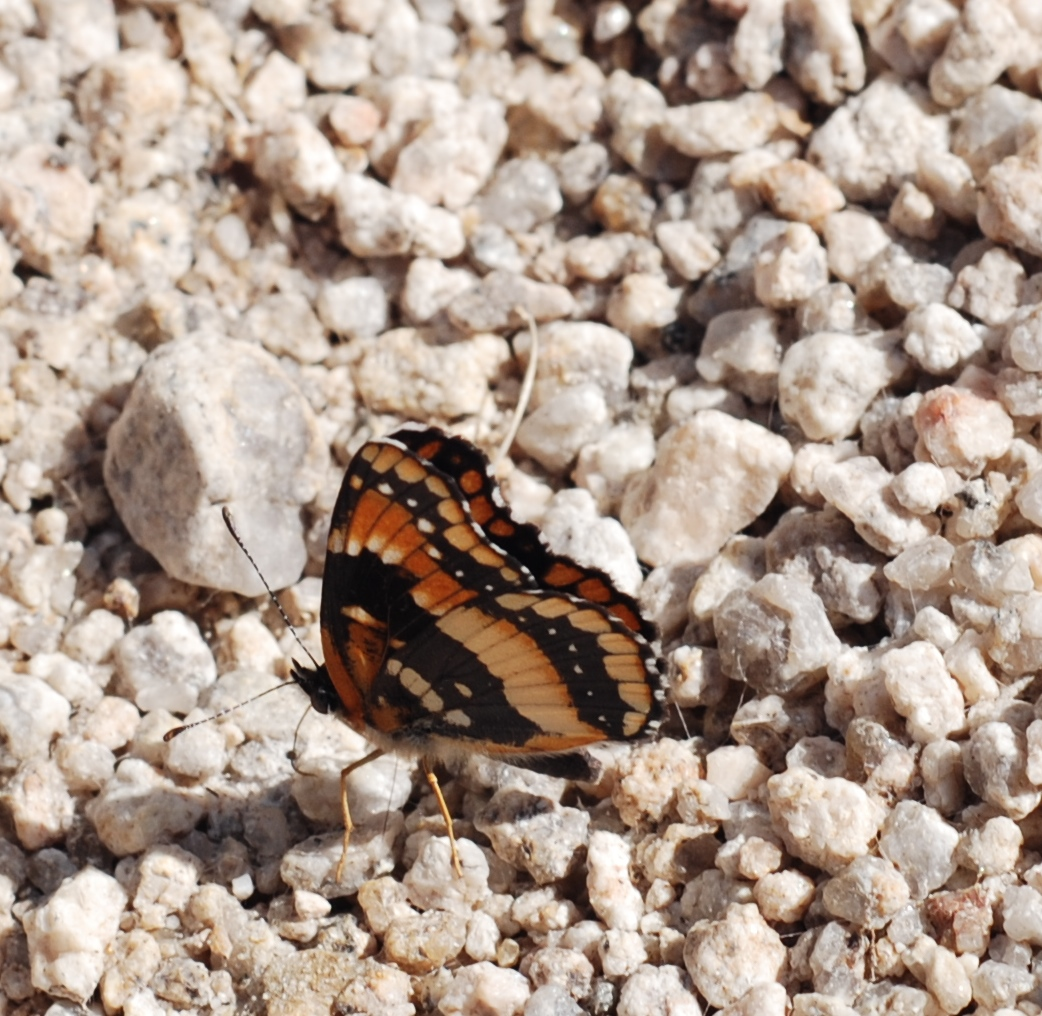

Scientific classification
- Kingdom: Animalia
- Phylum: Arthropoda
- Class: Insecta
- Order: Lepidoptera
- Family: Nymphalidae
- Genus: Chlosyne
- Species: C. californica

Binomial name
- Chlosyne californica (W. G. Wright, 1905)

Synonyms
- Synchloe californica Wright, 1905; Chlosyne california ab. chinoi Gunder, 1924

= Chlosyne californica =

California patch

Species of butterfly

Chlosyne californica, the California patch, is a butterfly of the family Nymphalidae found in the Southwestern United States and Mexico. It lives in desert washes and canyons in regions between southern Nevada south to southwestern Arizona, southeastern California, Baja California and Sonora.

The wingspan is 1 1/4–2 inches (32–51 mm). The upper side of the wings is brownish-black at the base and costal edge, with a wide yellow-orange median band and large orange submarginal spots. The underside is similar, with a red spot on the hindwing near the abdomen blending into the median band. Adults feed on flower nectar.

The larvae feed on Parish goldeneye (Bahiopsis parishii) and occasionally on sunflowers (Helianthus annuus).

== Bibliography ==
- Austin, George T. and Anna T. Austin. 1981. Butterflies of Clark County, Nevada. Journal of Research on the Lepidoptera 19(1): 1-63, 5 tbls. {Spring, 1980(81), 1 Dec 1981}
- Barnes, William and James Halliday McDunnough. 1916. Notes on North American diurnal Lepidoptera. Contributions to the Natural History of the Lepidoptera of North America 3(2): 49–156, 8 pls. {15 Dec 1916}
- Comstock, John Adams. 1927. Butterflies of California. A popular guide to a knowledge of the butterflies of California embracing all of the 477 species and varieties at present recorded from the state. Author, Los Angeles, California. 334 pp., 63 pls. {1927}
- Comstock, John Adams. 1929. Studies in Pacific Coast Lepidoptera (continued). Bulletin of the Southern California Academy of Sciences 28(3): 50–58, pls. 25-32 {Sep-Dec 1929}
- Duran, Victor and Fordyce Grinnell Jr. 1915. Three Synchloes, their differences and relations (Lep.). Entomological News 26(4): 173–174. {Apr [31 Mar] 1915}
- Gunder, Jean Daniel. 1924. Several new aberrant Lepidoptera (Rhopalocera) from California. Entomological News 35(5): 153–158, pl. 2. {8 May 1924} [description of Chlosyne californica ab. & chinoi]
- Higgins, Lionel George. 1960. A revision of the melitaeine genus Chlosyne and allied species (Lepidoptera: Nymphalidae). Transactions of the Royal Entomological Society of London 112(14): 381–467, 134 figs. {31 Dec 1960}
- Hoffmann, Carlos Christian. 1940. Catálogo systemático y zoogeográphico de los Lepidópteros Mexicanos, Primera parte. Papilionoidea. Anales del Instituto de Biología Universidad Nacional de México 11(2): 639–739, 2 maps. {[after 28 Dec] 1940}
- Tilden, James William. 1975. An analysis of the W. G. Wright butterfly and skipper plesiotypes in the collection of the California Academy of Sciences. Occasional Papers of the California Academy of Sciences (118): 1-44. {16 Jan 1975}
- Thorne, Fred. 1962. Larval notes on Chlosyne lacinia and C. californica. Journal of the Lepidopterists' Society 16(1): 61 {30 Aug 1962}
- Wright, William Greenwood. 1905. Butterflies of the West Coast of the United States. San Bernardino, California: 257 pp., 31 pls. {1905} [description of Synchloe californica]
