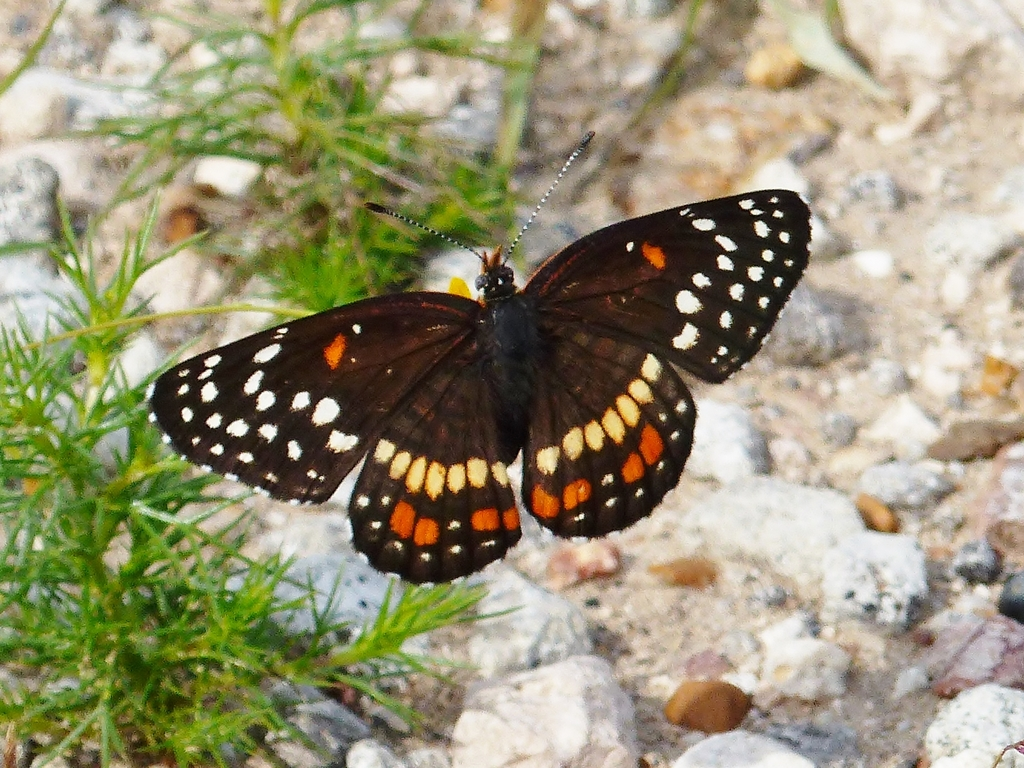

Scientific classification
- Kingdom: Animalia
- Phylum: Arthropoda
- Clade: Pancrustacea
- Class: Insecta
- Order: Lepidoptera
- Family: Nymphalidae
- Subtribe: Chlosynina
- Genus: Chlosyne
- Species: C. endeis

Binomial name
- Chlosyne endeis (Godman & Salvin, 1894)

= Chlosyne endeis =

Species of butterfly

Chlosyne endeis, commonly known as the banded checkerspot or banded patch, is a species of butterfly in the family Nymphalidae. It is found in North America.

== Subspecies ==
These two subspecies belong to the species Chlosyne endeis:

- Chlosyne endeis endeis
- Chlosyne endeis pardelina Scott, 1986
