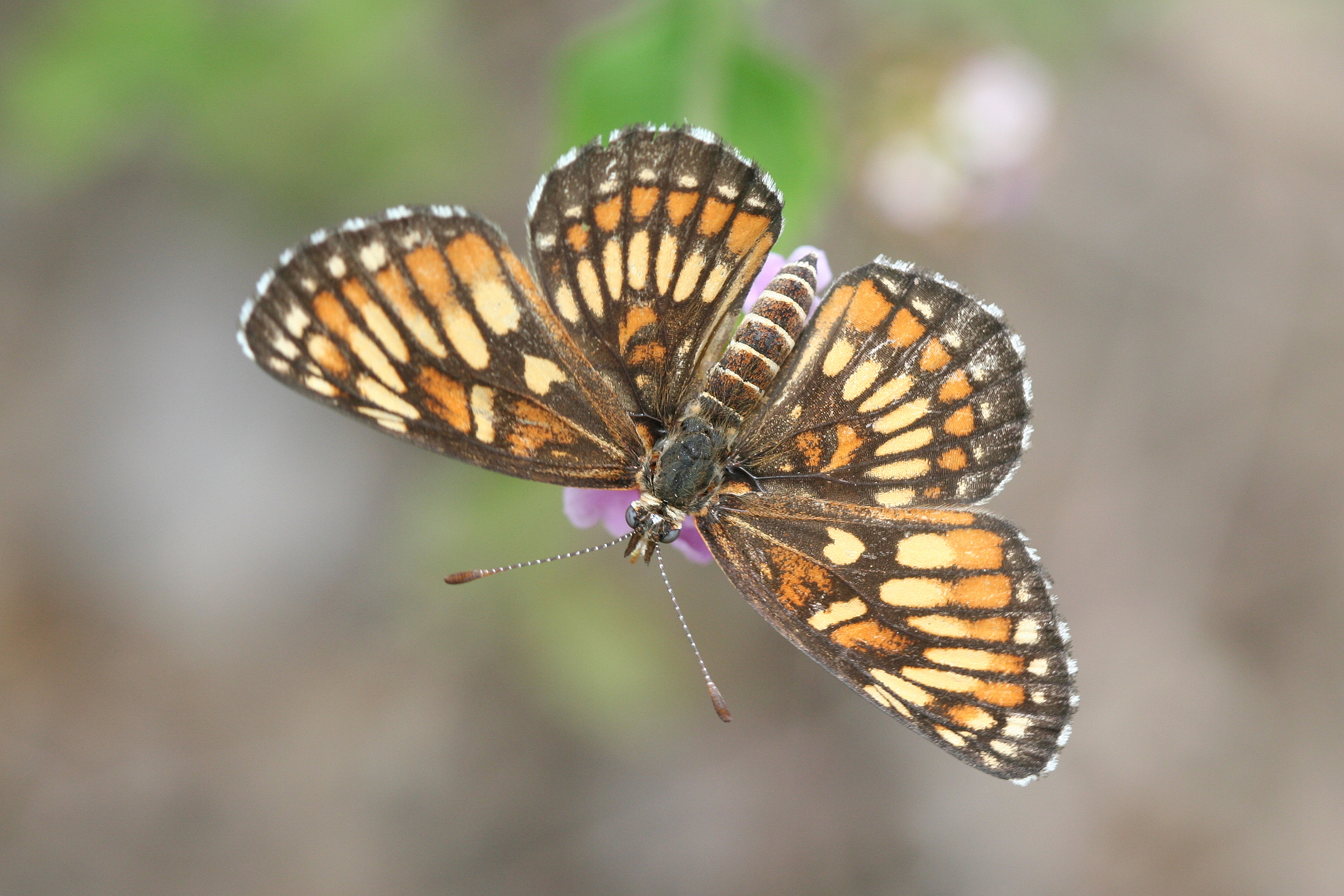

Scientific classification
- Kingdom: Animalia
- Phylum: Arthropoda
- Clade: Pancrustacea
- Class: Insecta
- Order: Lepidoptera
- Family: Nymphalidae
- Subtribe: Chlosynina
- Genus: Chlosyne
- Species: C. theona

Binomial name
- Chlosyne theona (Ménétriés, 1855)

= Chlosyne theona =

Species of butterfly

Chlosyne theona, the theona checkerspot, is a species checkerspots in the butterfly family Nymphalidae found in North America.

== Subspecies ==
These three subspecies belong to the species C. theona:

- C. t. bolli (W. H. Edwards, 1877)^{i}
- C. t. chinatiensis (Tinkham, 1944)^{i b} (chinati checkerspot)
- C. t. thekla (W. H. Edwards, 1870)^{i}

Data sources: i = ITIS, c = Catalogue of Life, g = GBIF, b = Bugguide.net
