= C. ehrenbergi =

C. ehrenbergi may refer to:

- Carcharias ehrenbergi, a requiem shark
- Crenella ehrenbergi, a bean mussel

== See also ==
- C. ehrenbergii (disambiguation)
