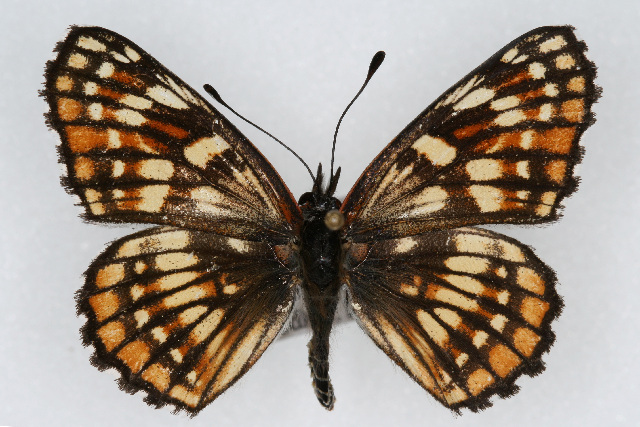
- Female
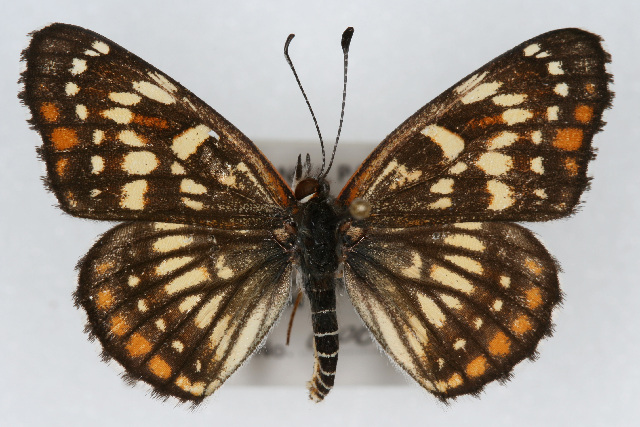
- Male

Scientific classification
- Domain: Eukaryota
- Kingdom: Animalia
- Phylum: Arthropoda
- Class: Insecta
- Order: Lepidoptera
- Family: Nymphalidae
- Genus: Chlosyne
- Species: C. fulvia

Binomial name
- Chlosyne fulvia (W.H. Edwards, 1879)

Synonyms
- Melitaea fulvia Edwards, 1879; Melitaea sinefascia R. C. Williams, 1914

= Chlosyne fulvia =

Fulvia checkerspot

Species of butterfly

Chlosyne fulvia, the Fulvia checkerspot, is a butterfly of the family Nymphalidae. It is found in North America from Kansas, Colorado, southern Utah and Arizona south to central Mexico.

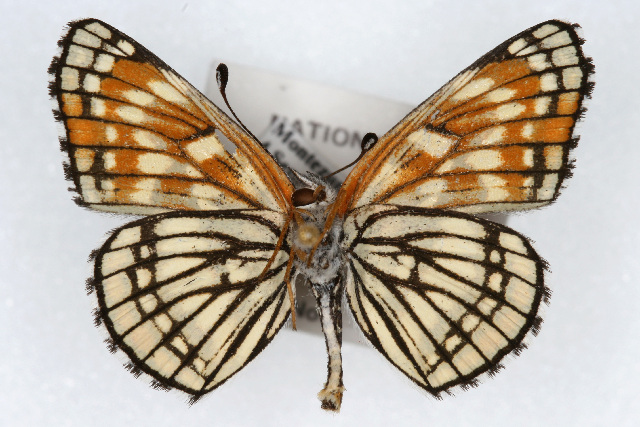
Ventral view

The wingspan is 32–50 mm. Adults feed on flower nectar.

The larvae feed on Castilleja integra and Castilleja lanata. They feed on the leaves and flowers of their host plant. Young larvae live together in a loose web. Third-instar larvae hibernate.

== Subspecies ==
- Chlosyne fulvia fulvia (Texas)
- Chlosyne fulvia coronado (Smith & Brock, 1988) (Arizona)
