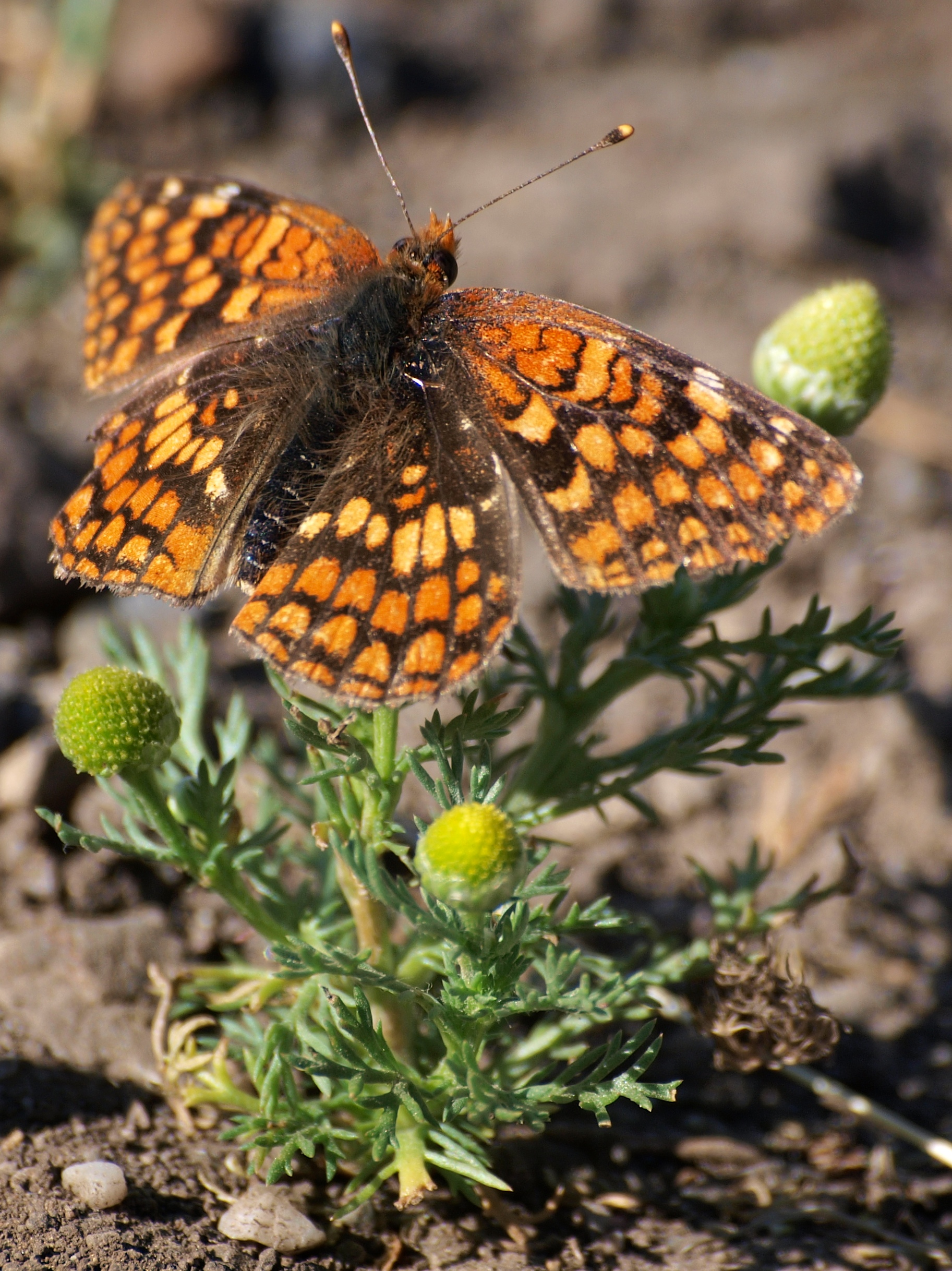

Scientific classification
- Domain: Eukaryota
- Kingdom: Animalia
- Phylum: Arthropoda
- Class: Insecta
- Order: Lepidoptera
- Family: Nymphalidae
- Genus: Chlosyne
- Species: C. palla

Binomial name
- Chlosyne palla (Boisduval, 1852)

Synonyms
- Melitaea palla Boisduval, 1852

= Chlosyne palla =

Northern checkerspot

Species of insect

Chlosyne palla, the northern checkerspot, is a butterfly of the family Nymphalidae that is found in North America. They range from southern British Columbia to Alberta, south to California, Utah, and Colorado, excluding Nevada.

== Description ==
The adult may be often confused with the others of the palla group, sagebrush checkerspot (C. acastus) and Hoffmann's checkerspot (C. hoffmanni). The adult's wingspan is 30–48 mm (1.2–1.9 in). The upperside of the wing has a pattern of dark brown, light orange and tan. The underside of the wing has alternating red and yellow cells.

== Life cycle ==
There is one flight that occurs between April and May or to July in mountainous or northerly areas. The caterpillar of this species feeds on goldenrod (Solidago), rabbitbrush (Chrysothamnus), and asters.
