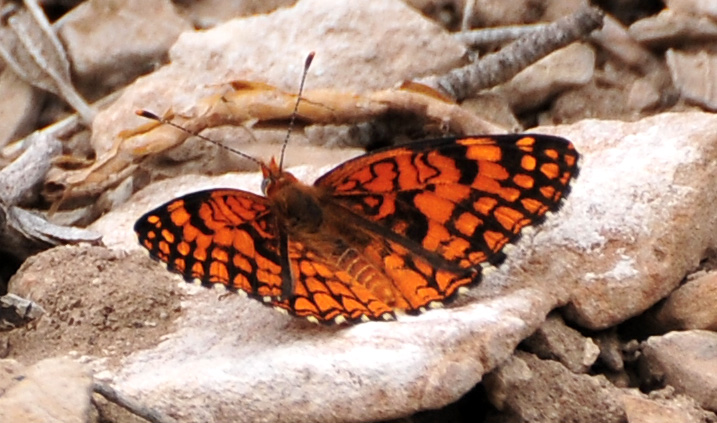

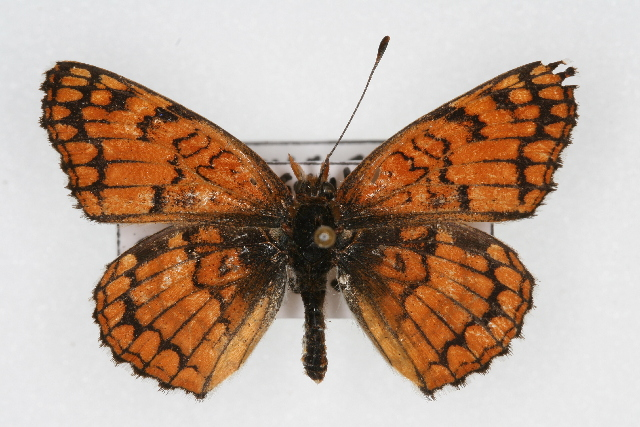

Scientific classification
- Domain: Eukaryota
- Kingdom: Animalia
- Phylum: Arthropoda
- Class: Insecta
- Order: Lepidoptera
- Family: Nymphalidae
- Genus: Chlosyne
- Species: C. acastus

Binomial name
- Chlosyne acastus (W. H. Edwards, 1874)

Synonyms
- Melitaea acastus; Lemonias acastus Dyar, 1903; Charidryas acastus

= Chlosyne acastus =

Sagebrush checkerspot

Species of insect

Chlosyne acastus, the sagebrush checkerspot, is a butterfly of the family Nymphalidae that is found in North America. They range from western United States east to Nebraska and north to southern Alberta.

== Description ==
The adult may be often confused with the northern checkerspot (C. palla) and Hoffmann's checkerspot (C. hoffmanni). The adult's wingspan is 33–44 mm (1.3–1.7 in).

== Life cycle ==
There is one flight that occurs between May and early September in Canada. The caterpillar of this species feeds on rabbit-brush (Chrysothamnus viscidiflorus) and desert-aster (Machaeranthera species).

== Subspecies ==
- C. a. neumoegeni (Skinner, 1895)
- C. a. sabina (Wright, 1905)
