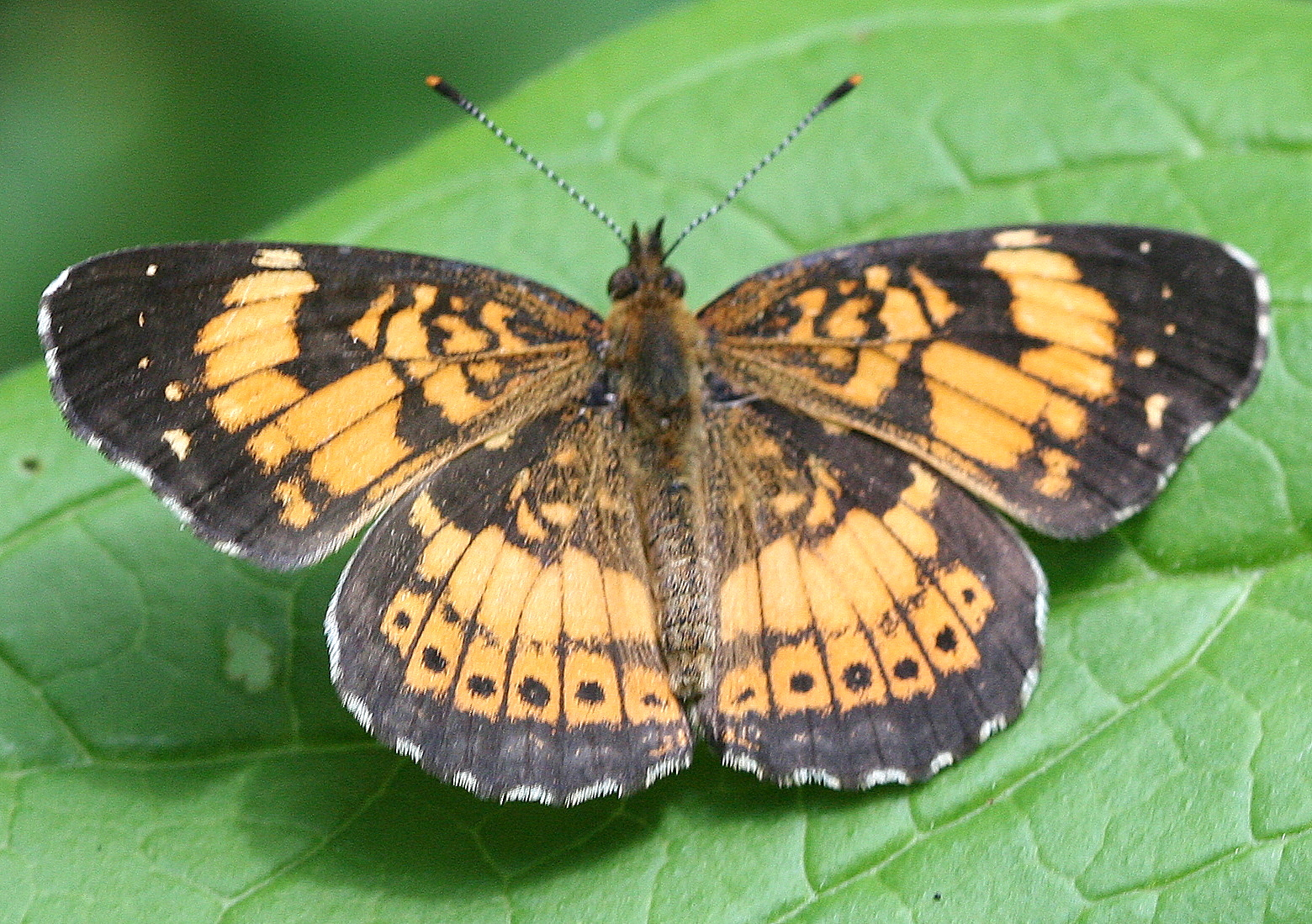
- Silvery checkerspot

Scientific classification
- Domain: Eukaryota
- Kingdom: Animalia
- Phylum: Arthropoda
- Class: Insecta
- Order: Lepidoptera
- Family: Nymphalidae
- Subfamily: Nymphalinae
- Tribe: Melitaeini
- Subtribe: Chlosynina
- Genus: Chlosyne; Butler, 1870

Synonyms
- Morpheis Geyer, [1833] (Unav.); Synchloe Doubleday, 1844 (Preocc.); Coatlantona Kirby, 1871; Anemeca Kirby, 1871; Charidryas Scudder, 1872; Limnaecia Scudder, 1872; Thessalia Scudder, 1875

= Chlosyne =

Genus of insects

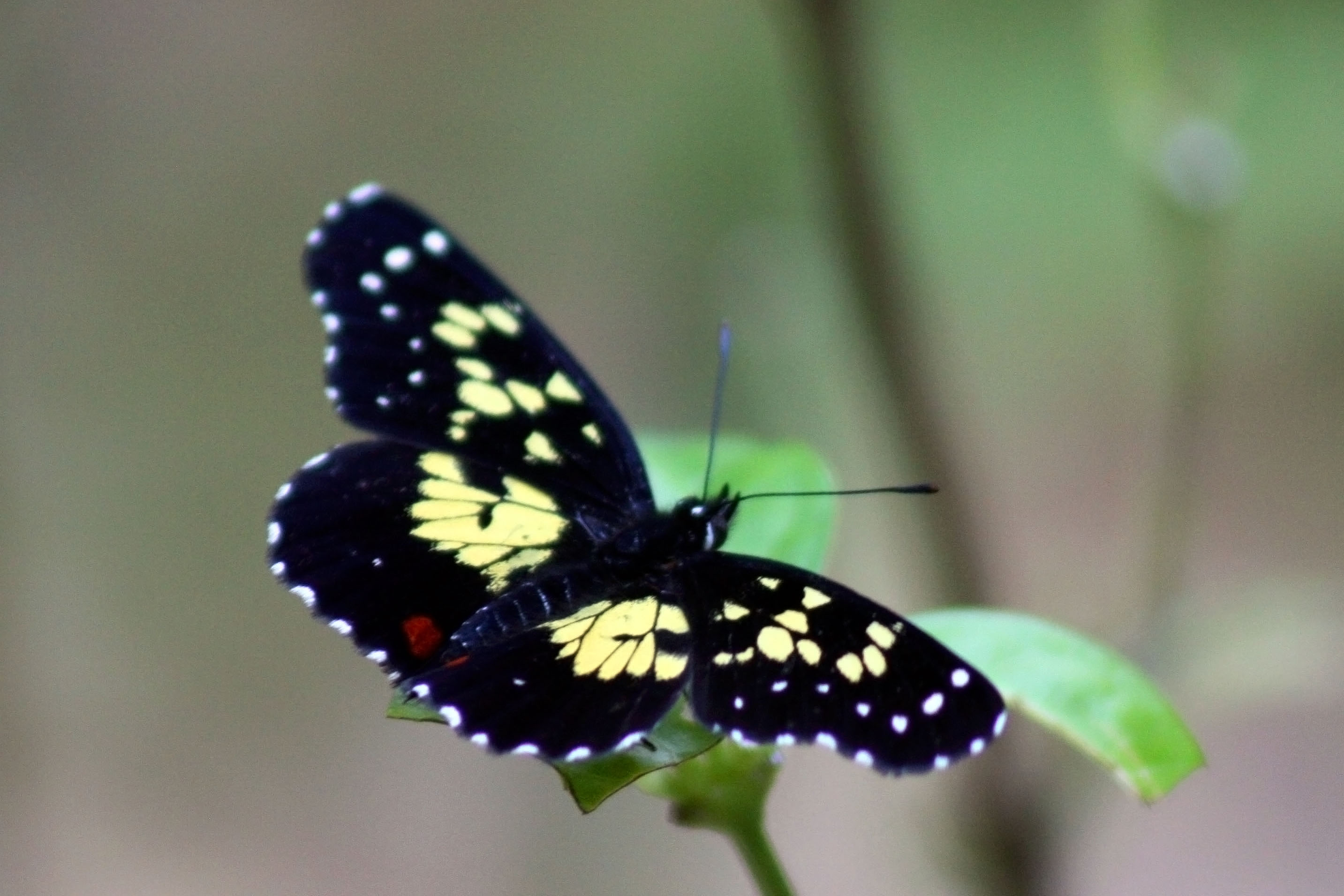
Poecile checkerspot (Chlosyne erodyle poecile) Costa Rica

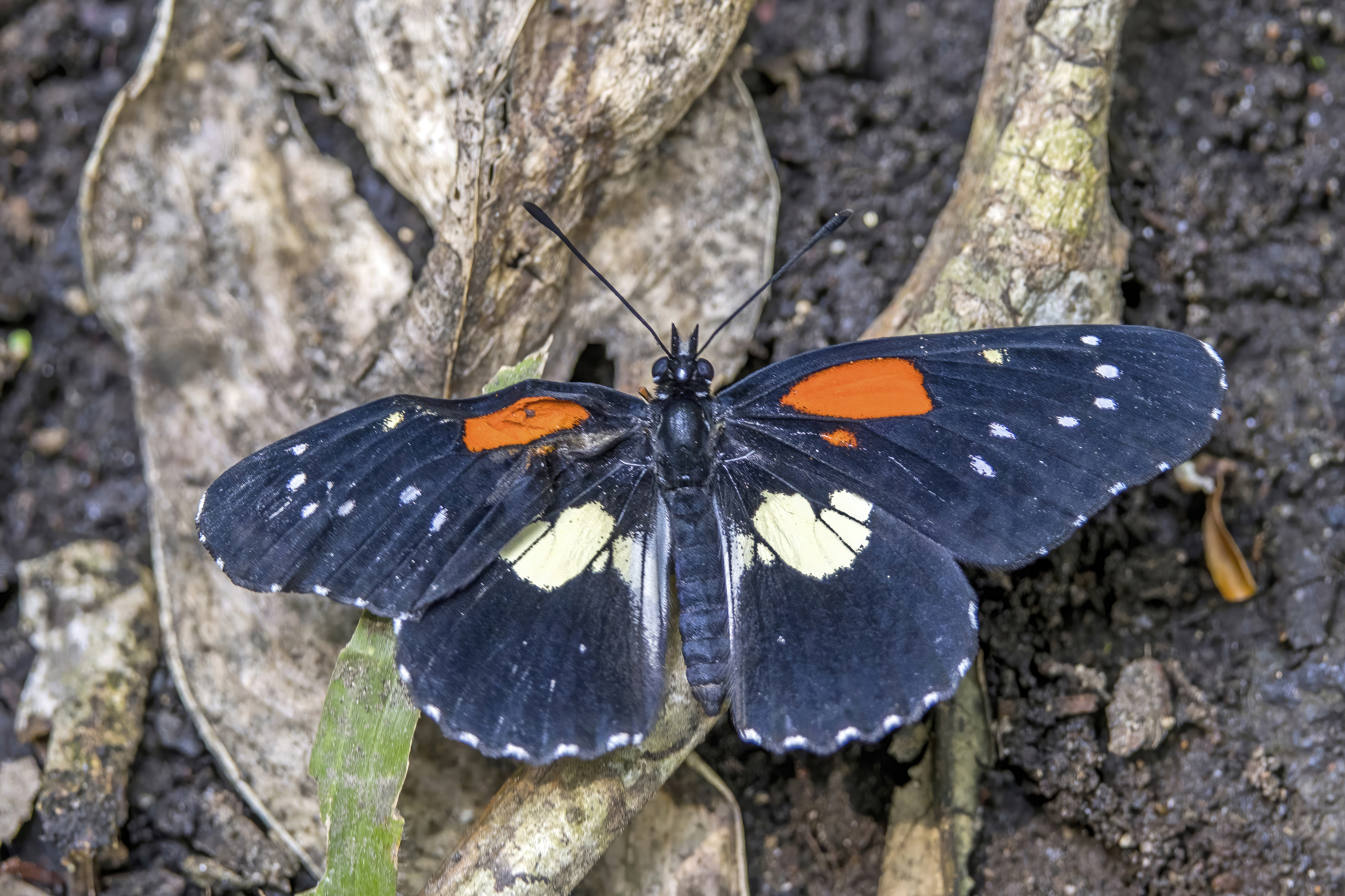
Gaudy patch (Chlosyne gaudialis) Guatemala.

Chlosyne is a genus of butterflies from North and South America in the family Nymphalidae.

== Species ==
Listed alphabetically within groups:

The lacinia species group:

- Chlosyne californica (Wright, 1905) – California patch
- Chlosyne definita (Aaron, [1885]) – definite patch
- Chlosyne ehrenbergii (Geyer, 1833) – white-rayed checkerspot, white-rayed patch
- Chlosyne endeis (Godman & Salvin, 1894) – banded checkerspot, banded patch
- Chlosyne erodyle (Bates, 1864) – erodyle checkerspot, Guatemalan patch
- Chlosyne janais (Drury, [1782]) – Janais patch, crimson patch
- Chlosyne gaudialis (Bates, 1864) – gaudy checkerspot, gaudy patch
- Chlosyne hippodrome (Geyer, 1837) – simple checkerspot, simple patch
- Chlosyne lacinia (Geyer, 1837) – bordered patch, sunflower patch
- Chlosyne marina (Geyer, 1837) – marina checkerspot, red-spotted patch
- Chlosyne melanarge (Bates, 1864) – black checkerspot, cream-banded checkerspot, black patch
- Chlosyne narva (Fabricius, 1793) – Narva checkerspot
- Chlosyne rosita Hall, 1924 – Rosita patch

The Charidryas species group:

- Chlosyne acastus (Edwards, 1874) – sagebrush checkerspot
- Chlosyne gabbii (Behr, 1863) – Gabb's checkerspot
- Chlosyne hoffmanni (Behr, 1863) – aster checkerspot, Hoffmann's checkerspot
- Chlosyne palla (Boisduval, 1852) – northern checkerspot
- Chlosyne whitneyi (Behr, 1863) – rockslide checkerspot
  - Chlosyne whitneyi damoetas (Skinner, 1902)

The harrisii species group:

- Chlosyne harrisii (Scudder, 1864) – Harris's checkerspot
- Chlosyne gorgone (Hübner, 1810) – gorgone crescentspot
- Chlosyne nycteis (Doubleday, [1847]) – silvery crescentspot

The Thessalia species group:

- Chlosyne chinatiensis (Tinkham, 1944) – Chinati checkerspot
- Chlosyne cyneas (Godman & Salvin, 1878) – Cyneas checkerspot, black checkerspot
- Chlosyne leanira (C. & R. Felder, 1860) – leanira checkerspot
- Chlosyne theona (Ménétriés, 1855) – Theona checkerspot

Uncertain grouping:

- Chlosyne fulvia (Edwards, 1879) – Fulvia checkerspot
- Chlosyne kendallorum Opler, 1999 – Kendall's checkerspot, Nuevo León checkerspot
