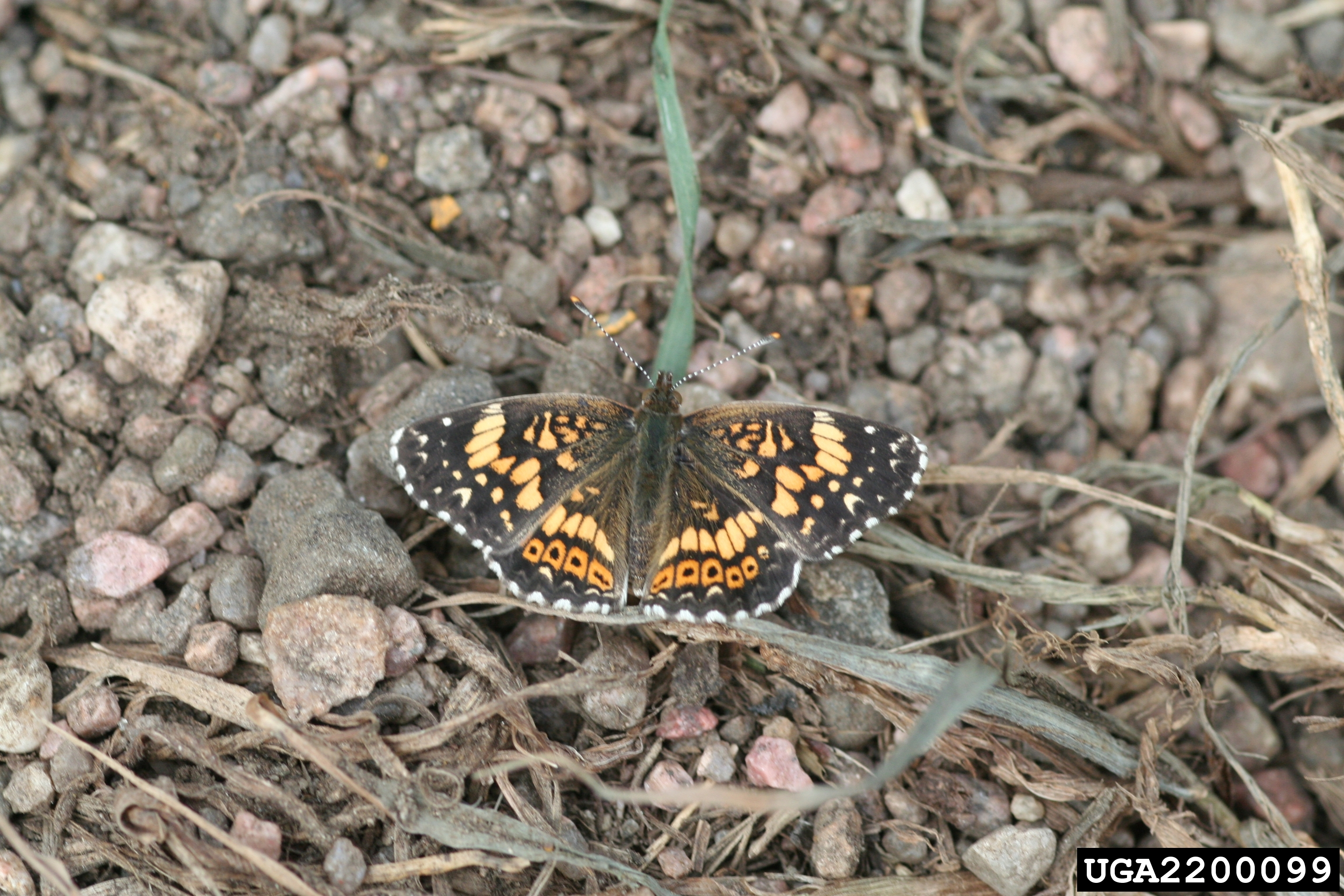
- Dorsal view

Conservation status
- Secure (NatureServe)

Scientific classification
- Domain: Eukaryota
- Kingdom: Animalia
- Phylum: Arthropoda
- Class: Insecta
- Order: Lepidoptera
- Family: Nymphalidae
- Genus: Chlosyne
- Species: C. gorgone

Binomial name
- Chlosyne gorgone (Hübner, 1810)

Subspecies
- Chlosyne gorgone carlota (Reakirt 1866)

Synonyms
- Dryas gorgone

= Chlosyne gorgone =

Species of butterfly

Chlosyne gorgone, the gorgone checkerspot, is a species of Nymphalinae butterfly that occurs in North America.

== Description ==
The wingspan is between 32 and 45 mm. The dorsal side of the wings are orange with black markings and the hindwings have a submarginal row of solid black dots. The ventral view has a zigzag pattern of brown and white bands with a median band of white chevrons.

== Range and habitat ==
The gorgone checkerspot's range is in North America from Alberta east to southern Ontario, south into central Texas, between the Rocky Mountains and Appalachians. Within its range they can most commonly be seen in open areas including ridges, prairies and old fields. They can also be seen at streamsides and in open hardwood forests.

== Life cycle ==
In the northern range there is one brood between July and August, two in the mid-range between May and September and three in the southern range between April and September. The females lay their eggs in clusters on the underside of their host plants. Early instar caterpillars feed in groups and third-instar caterpillars hibernate.

=== Larval foods ===
- Helianthus species
- Ambrosia trifida
- Iva xanthifolia
- Viguiera multiflora

=== Adult foods ===
- Nectar
  - Yellow flowers
