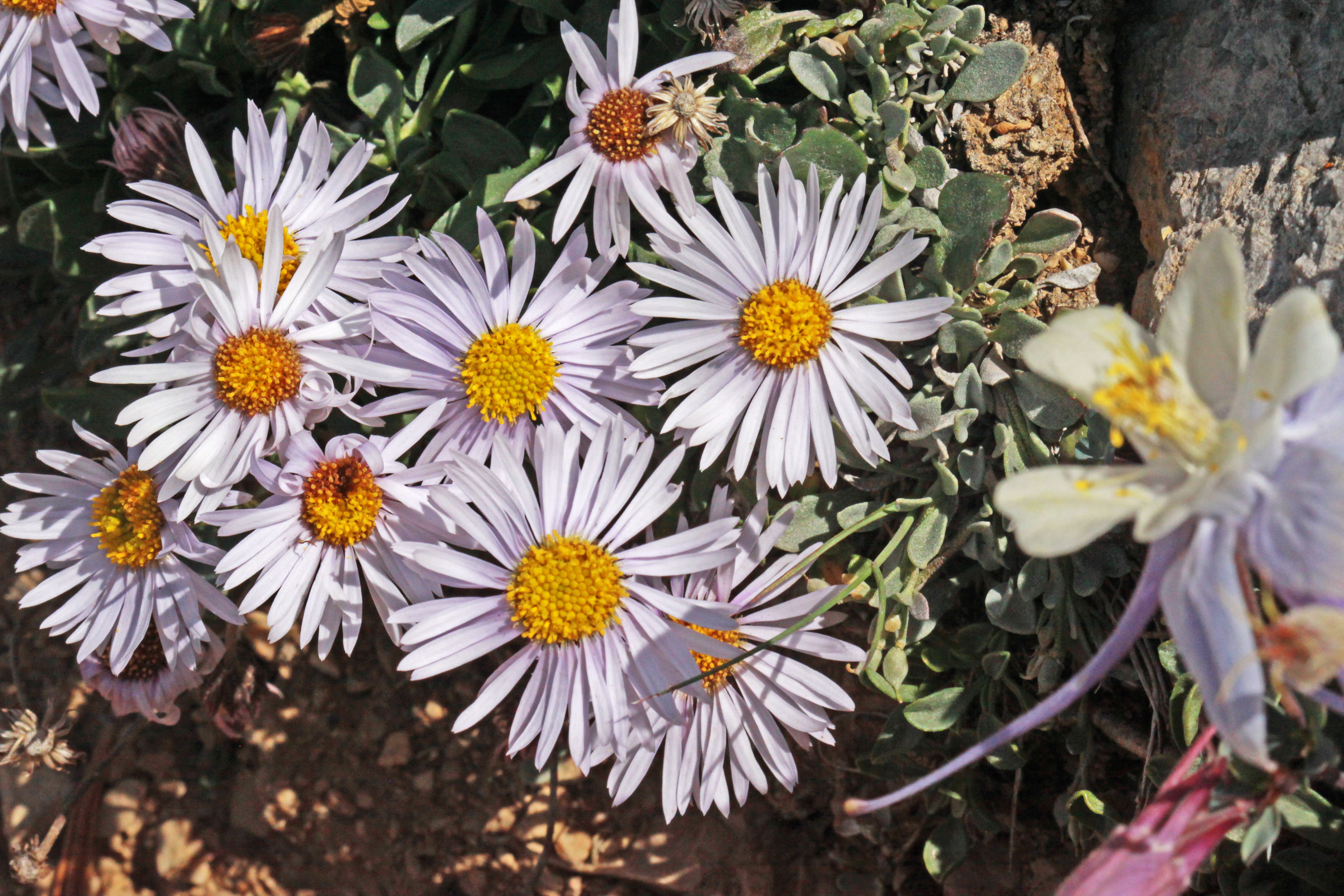

Conservation status
- Apparently Secure (NatureServe)

Scientific classification
- Kingdom: Plantae
- Clade: Tracheophytes
- Clade: Angiosperms
- Clade: Eudicots
- Clade: Asterids
- Order: Asterales
- Family: Asteraceae
- Genus: Erigeron
- Species: E. leiomerus

Binomial name
- Erigeron leiomerus A.Gray

Synonyms
- Erigeron spathulifolius Rydb.

= Erigeron leiomerus =

Species of flowering plant

Erigeron leiomerus is a rare species of flowering plant in the family Asteraceae known by the common names rockslide yellow fleabane or rockslide fleabane. It is native to the western United States, primarily in the Rocky Mountains and the Great Basin. It has been found in Montana, Idaho, Nevada, Utah, Wyoming, Colorado, and New Mexico.

Erigeron leiomerus is a branching perennial herb up to 15 centimeters (6 inches) tall, producing a woody taproot. The leaves and the stem are covered with hairs. The plant generally produces only 1 flower head per stem, each head with up to 60 purple, blue, white ray florets surrounding numerous yellow disc florets. The species grows on rockslides in alpine tundra and coniferous forests at high elevations.
