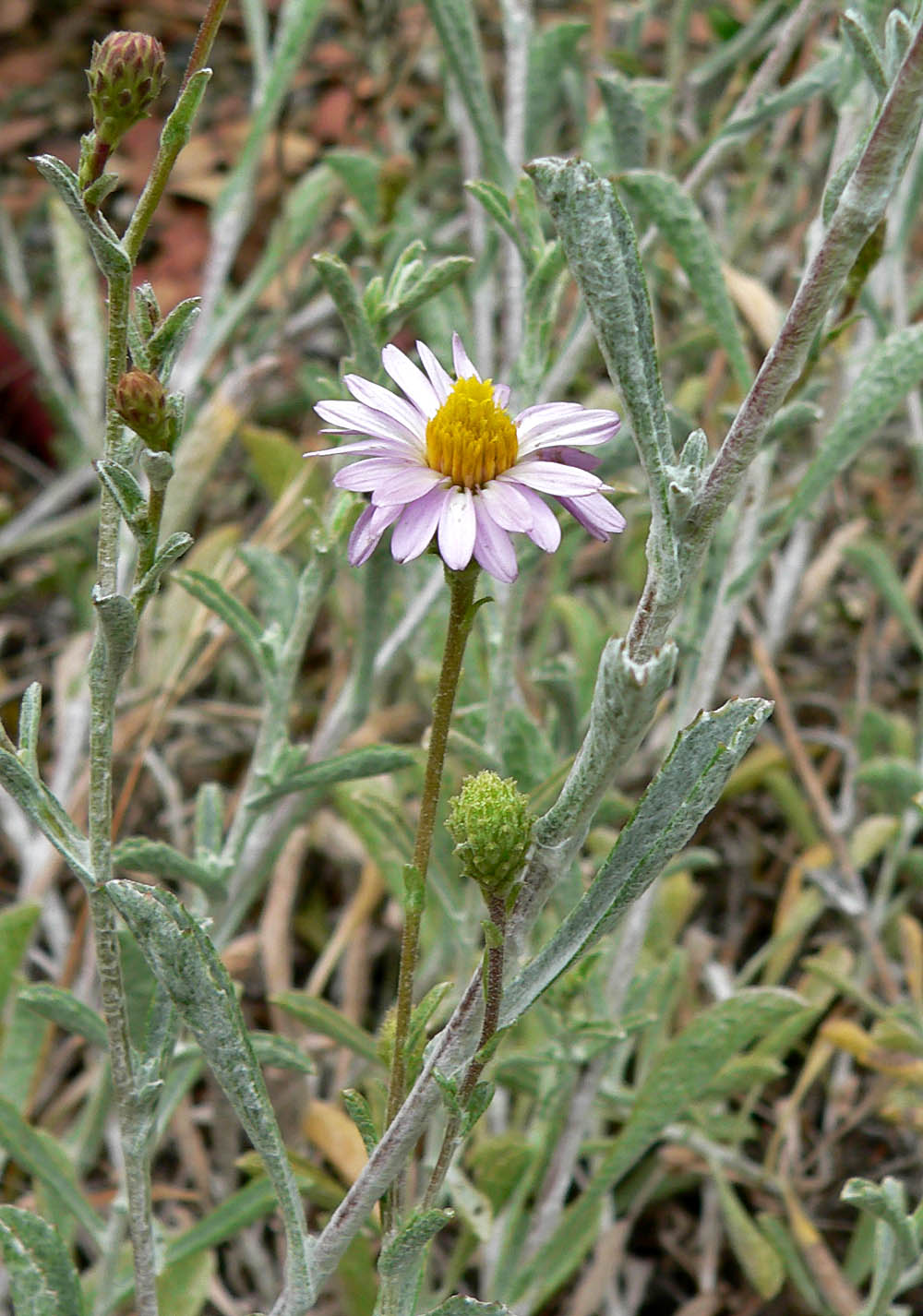

Conservation status
- Vulnerable (NatureServe)

Scientific classification
- Kingdom: Plantae
- Clade: Tracheophytes
- Clade: Angiosperms
- Clade: Eudicots
- Clade: Asterids
- Order: Asterales
- Family: Asteraceae
- Subfamily: Asteroideae
- Tribe: Astereae
- Genus: Corethrogyne; DC.
- Species: C. filaginifolia

Binomial name
- Corethrogyne filaginifolia (Hook. & Arn.) Nutt.

Synonyms
- Synonymy: Aster filaginifolius Hook. & Arn.; Aster tomentellus Hook. & Arn.; Corethrogyne brevicula Greene; Corethrogyne caespitosa Greene; Corethrogyne californica DC.; Corethrogyne flagellaris Greene; Corethrogyne floccosa Greene; Corethrogyne incana (Lindl.) Nutt.; Corethrogyne lavandulacea Greene; Corethrogyne leucophylla (Lindl. ex DC.) Menzies ex Jeps.; Corethrogyne linifolia (H.M.Hall) Ferris; Corethrogyne obovata Benth.; Corethrogyne racemosa Greene; Corethrogyne rigida (Benth.) A.Heller; Corethrogyne scabra Greene; Corethrogyne sessilis Greene; Corethrogyne spathulata A.Gray; Corethrogyne tomentella (Hook. & Arn.) Torr. & A.Gray; Corethrogyne virgata Benth.; Corethrogyne viscidula Greene; Lessingia filaginifolia (Hook. & Arn.) M.A.Lane

= Corethrogyne =

Species of flowering plant

Corethrogyne is a monotypic genus of flowering plant in the family Asteraceae. Its only species is Corethrogyne filaginifolia (syn. Lessingia filaginifolia), known by the common names common sandaster and California aster. Note that Symphyotrichum chilense shares its common name of California aster.

== Description ==
Corethrogyne filaginifolia is a robust perennial herb or subshrub producing a simple to multibranched stem approaching 1 metre (3.3 ft) in maximum length or height. The densely woolly leaves are several centimeters long and toothed or lobed low on the stem and smaller higher up the stem.

The inflorescence is a single flower head or array of several heads at the tips of stem branches. The head is lined with narrow, pointed, purple-tipped phyllaries which curl back as the head matures. Inside are many purple, lavender, pink, or white ray florets and a center packed with up to 120 tubular yellow disc florets.

The fruit is an achene with a pappus of reddish bristles on top.

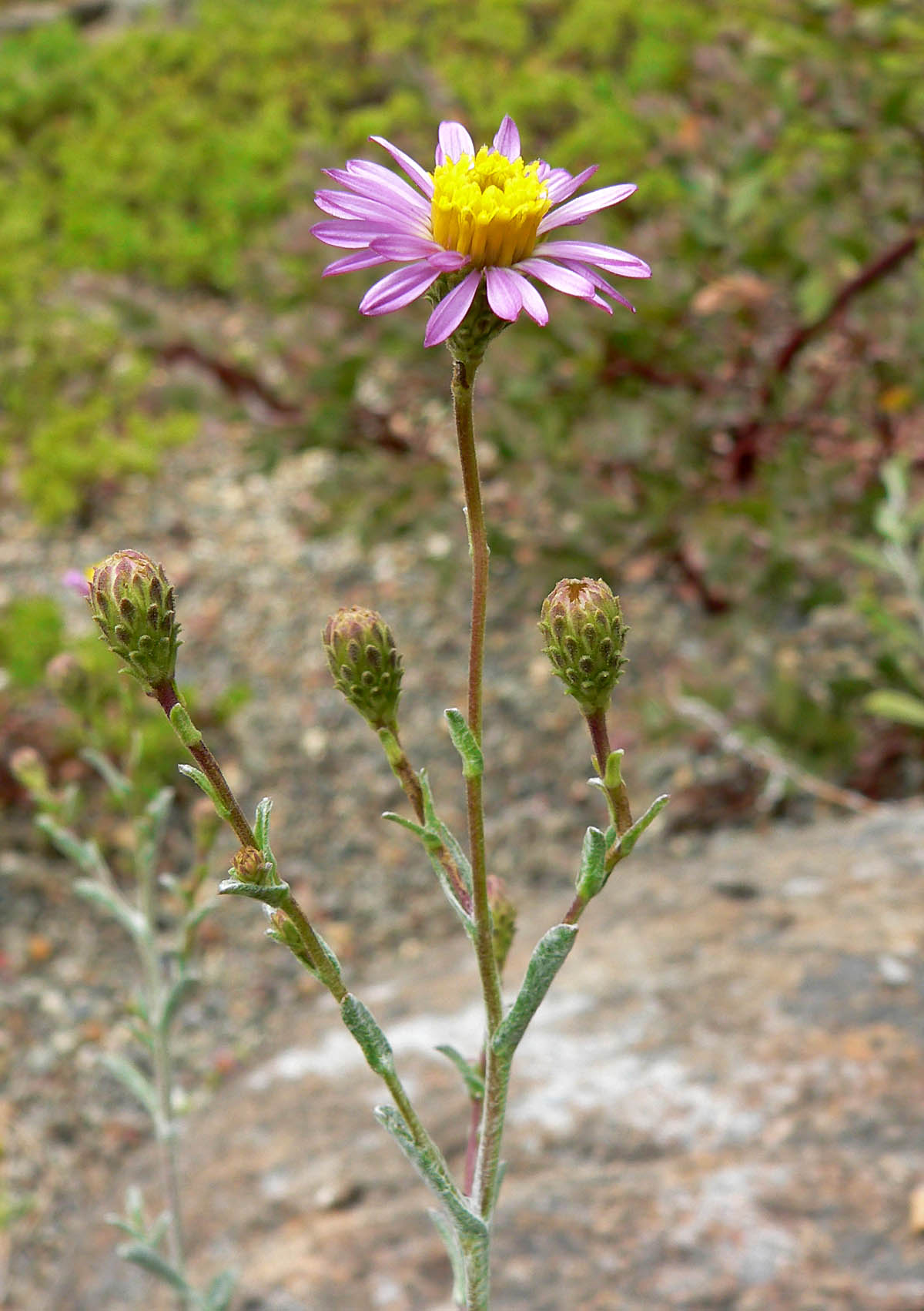

== Taxonomy ==
The genus Corethrogyne was established by Augustin Pyramus de Candolle in 1836 for the species he described as Corethrogyne californica. De Candolle explained the genus name as derived from Greek κόρηθρον, kórethron, 'broom', 'brush' and γυνή, gyné, 'woman', 'female', referring to the appendages on the style branches.

In 1833, William Jackson Hooker and George A. Walker Arnott had described Aster filaginifolius. This species is now regarded as synonymous with Corethrogyne californica, in which case the oldest epithet is filaginifolius, so the correct name in Corethrogyne is Corethrogyne filaginifolia. Species placed in Corethrogyne were later grouped together under the name Lessingia filaginifolia, and then moved back to genus Corethrogyne as a single species with many synonyms. As of May 2024, Plants of the World Online accepted only one species in the genus Corethrogyne, Corethrogyne filaginifolia, making the genus monotypic.

== Distribution and habitat ==
Corethrogyne filaginifolia is native to western North America from the southwestern corner of Oregon through California to Baja California, where it is a common member of many plant communities, including chaparral and woodlands, forests, scrub, grasslands, and the serpentine soils flora.
