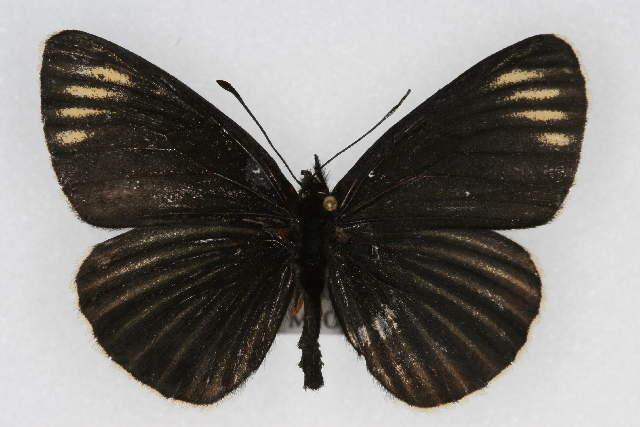

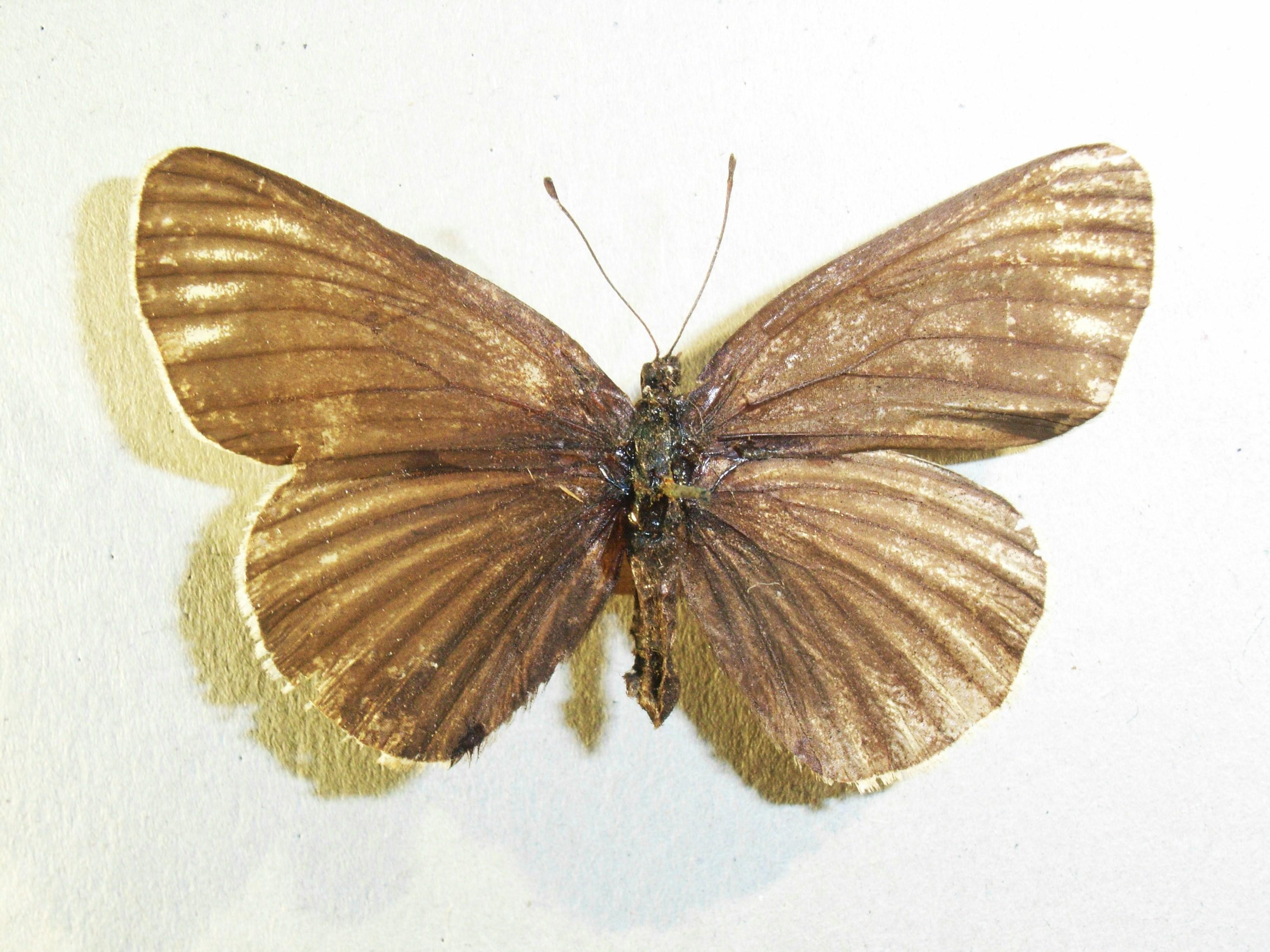

Scientific classification
- Kingdom: Animalia
- Phylum: Arthropoda
- Clade: Pancrustacea
- Class: Insecta
- Order: Lepidoptera
- Family: Nymphalidae
- Genus: Chlosyne
- Species: C. ehrenbergii

Binomial name
- Chlosyne ehrenbergii (Geyer, [1833])

Synonyms
- Morpheis ehrenbergii Geyer, [1833]; Anemeca ehrenbergi

= Chlosyne ehrenbergii =

Species of butterfly

Chlosyne ehrenbergii, the white-rayed checkerspot, white-rayed patch or Ehrenberg's patch, is a butterfly of the family Nymphalidae. It is found in Mexico.

Adult females are highly gregarious, clustering together in groups on Buddleia bushes. Adults feed on flower nectar of various flowers, including daisies and other Asteraceae species.

The larvae feed on Buddleia species.
