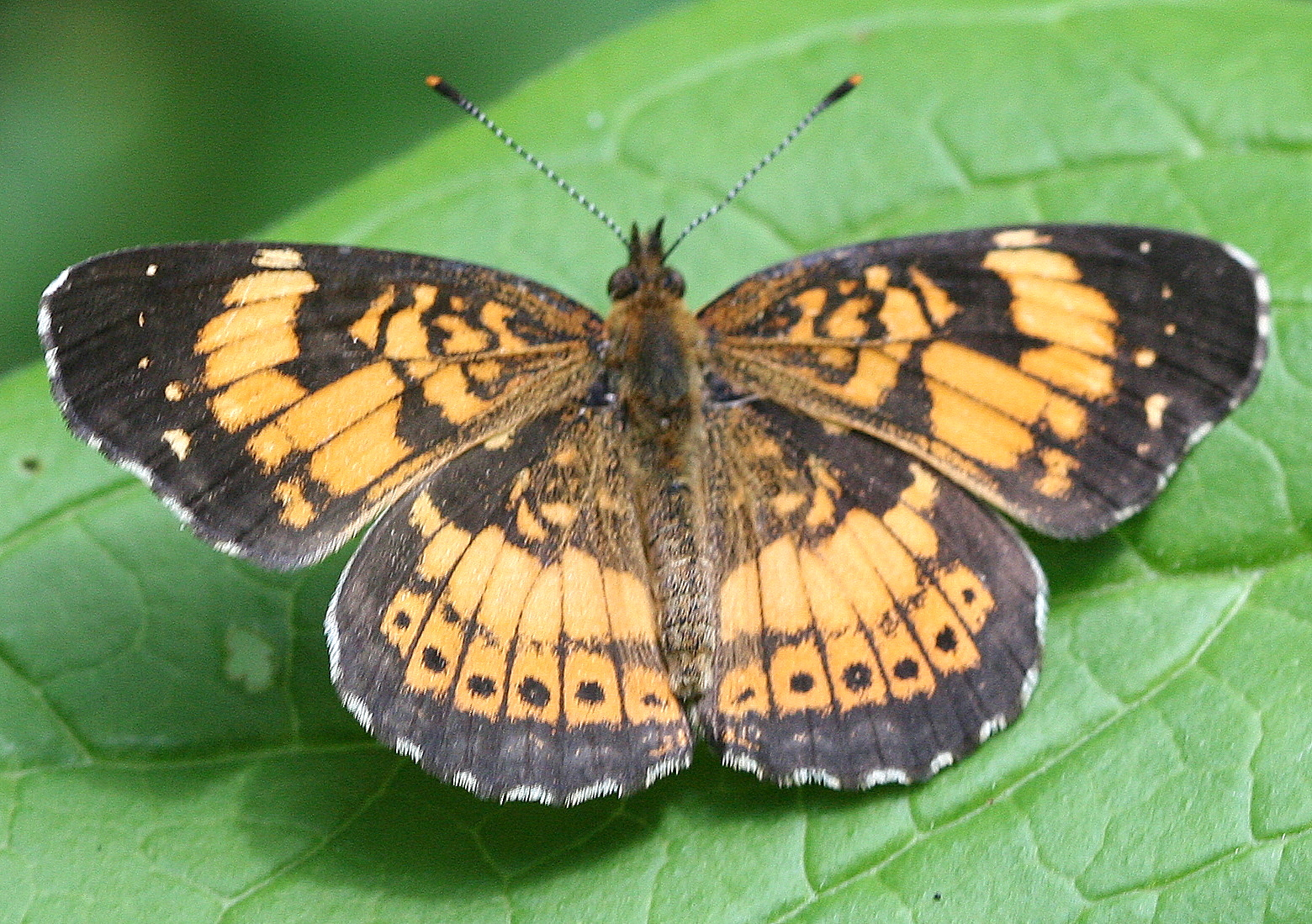
- Dorsal view

Conservation status
- Secure (NatureServe)

Scientific classification
- Kingdom: Animalia
- Phylum: Arthropoda
- Clade: Pancrustacea
- Class: Insecta
- Order: Lepidoptera
- Family: Nymphalidae
- Genus: Chlosyne
- Species: C. nycteis

Binomial name
- Chlosyne nycteis (Doubleday, 1847)

Subspecies
- Chlosyne nycteis drusius (Edwards, 1884); Chlosyne nycteis reversa (F. & R. Chermock, 1940)

Synonyms
- Melitaea nycteis; Charidryas harrisii

= Chlosyne nycteis =

Species of butterfly

Chlosyne nycteis, the silvery checkerspot, is a species of Nymphalinae butterfly that occurs in North America. In the United States, it is listed as a species of special concern in Connecticut and Maine, and is believed to be extirpated in Connecticut, Massachusetts, and New Hampshire.

== Description ==
=== Adult ===
The dorsal view is pale yellow-orange with dark borders and markings. The hindwing has white-centered submarginal spots on both sides, dorsal and ventral. The hindwing is pale and has a white crescent at the margin.

=== Caterpillar ===
The caterpillar is almost all black with dusted white spots. Sometimes, it has a yellow-orange stripe or two smaller stripes along the side. The family Nymphalidae is known for its branched spines.

== Range and habitat ==
Their range consists of southern Canada south to Georgia, Florida, and Texas. Silvery checkerspots enjoy moist areas such as streamsides. They can also be seen in meadows and forest openings.

== Lifecycle ==
In the northern portion of its habitat, one brood hatches between June and July; for the remainder of its range, two broods occur from May to September. Three broods have been reported in the deep southern part of Texas. Females lay eggs in batches which can be up to 100 individuals. Early instar caterpillars stay in groups as they skeletonize leaves while the third instar hibernates.

=== Larval foods ===
Larval foods include various asters, such as Eurybia macrophylla, Verbesina alternifolia, Helianthus, and Rudbeckia.

=== Adult foods ===
Adult foods include nectar from red clover, common milkweed, and dogbane.
