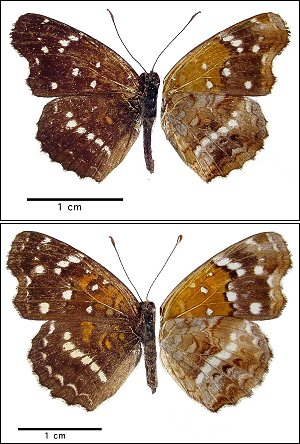

Conservation status
- Secure (NatureServe)

Scientific classification
- Kingdom: Animalia
- Phylum: Arthropoda
- Class: Insecta
- Order: Lepidoptera
- Family: Nymphalidae
- Genus: Anthanassa
- Species: A. texana

Binomial name
- Anthanassa texana (W.H. Edwards, 1863)

Synonyms
- Melitaea texana W.H. Edwards, 1863; Tritanassa texana; Phyciodes texana; Eresia smerdis Hewitson, 1864; Eresia texana seminole Skinner, 1911

= Anthanassa texana =

Texan crescentspot

Species of butterfly

Anthanassa texana, the Texan crescentspot, is a species of butterfly in the family Nymphalidae. It is found from Guatemala north through Mexico to southern California, east across the southern United States to northern Florida, Georgia and South Carolina. Strays may be found up to Arkansas, Missouri, Illinois, South Dakota, and central Nevada. The habitat consists of deserts, dry gulches, open areas, streamsides, road edges, and city parks.

The wingspan is 32–48 mm. Adults are on wing from March to November in southern Florida and Arizona. They are on wing year round in southern Texas and the tropics. There are several generations per year. Adults feed on flower nectar.

The larvae feed on the leaves of various low-growing plants of the family Acanthaceae, including Diciliptera brachiata, Jacobinia carnea, Beloperone, Siphonoglossa, and Ruellia species.

== Subspecies ==
- Anthanassa texana texana (Arizona, Texas, New Mexico, Nebraska, Mexico)

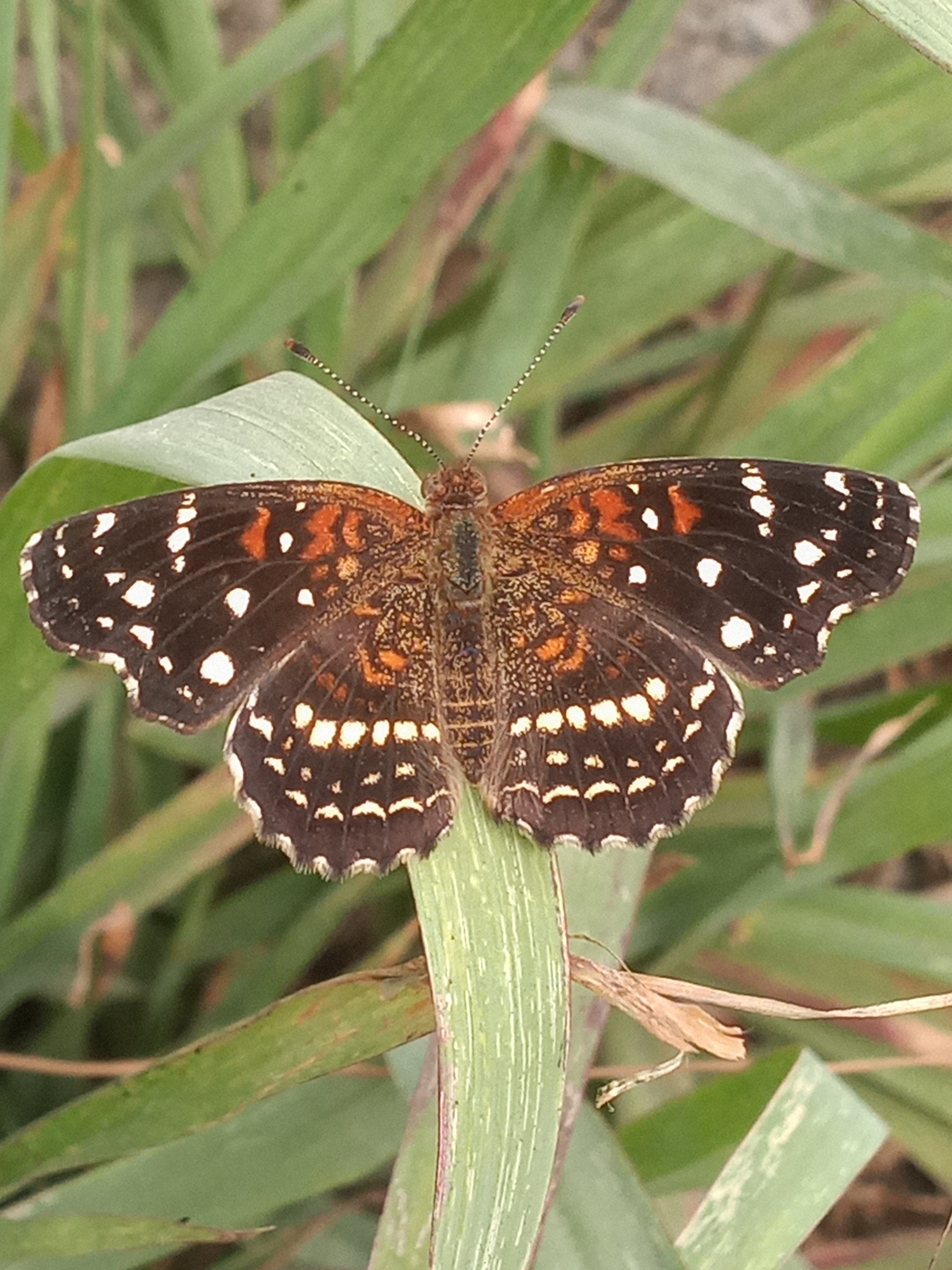
Mariposa Lunita Tejana (Texan crescentspot butterfly) Anthanassa texana ssp. texana, Monterrey, Nuevo León, Mexico

- Anthanassa texana seminole (Skinner, 1911) (Florida, Georgia)
