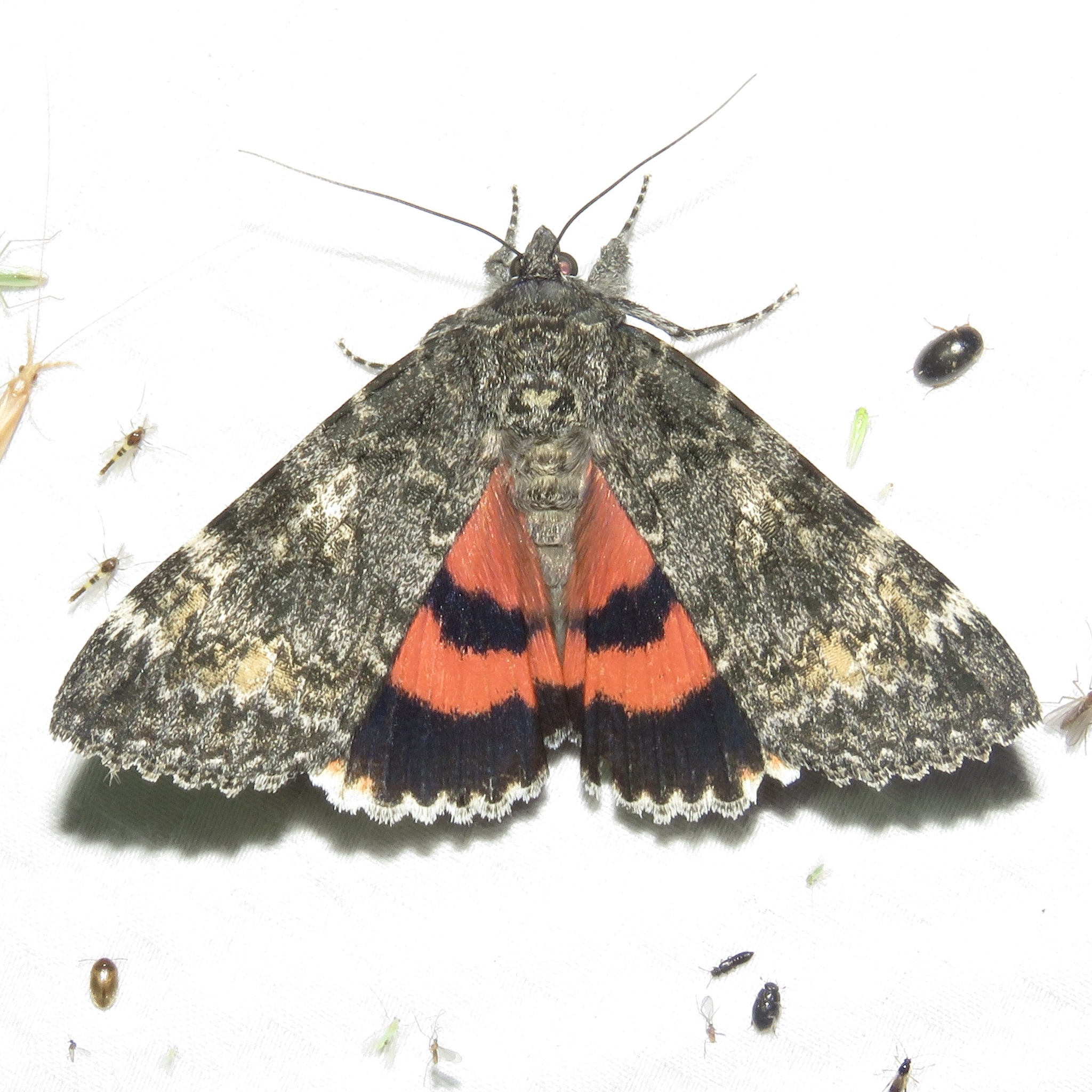

Scientific classification
- Kingdom: Animalia
- Phylum: Arthropoda
- Class: Insecta
- Order: Lepidoptera
- Superfamily: Noctuoidea
- Family: Erebidae
- Genus: Catocala
- Species: C. briseis

Binomial name
- Catocala briseis W. H. Edwards, 1864

Synonyms
- Catocala briseis f. briseana Strand, 1914; Catocala clarissima Beutenmueller, 1918; Catocala briseis var. albida Beutenmueller, 1907; Catocala minerva Cassino, 1917

= Catocala briseis =

Species of moth

Catocala briseis, the Briseis underwing or ribbed underwing, is a moth of the family Erebidae. The species was first described by William Henry Edwards in 1864. It is found across the North American Boreal forest region from Newfoundland to the Pacific, south to Massachusetts and Pennsylvania.

The wingspan is 59–65 mm. Adults are on wing from July to September depending on the location.

The larvae feed on Populus species, including Populus tremuloides and Salix species.

== Subspecies ==
Catocala briseis minerva, recorded from Utah, is now considered a synonym.
