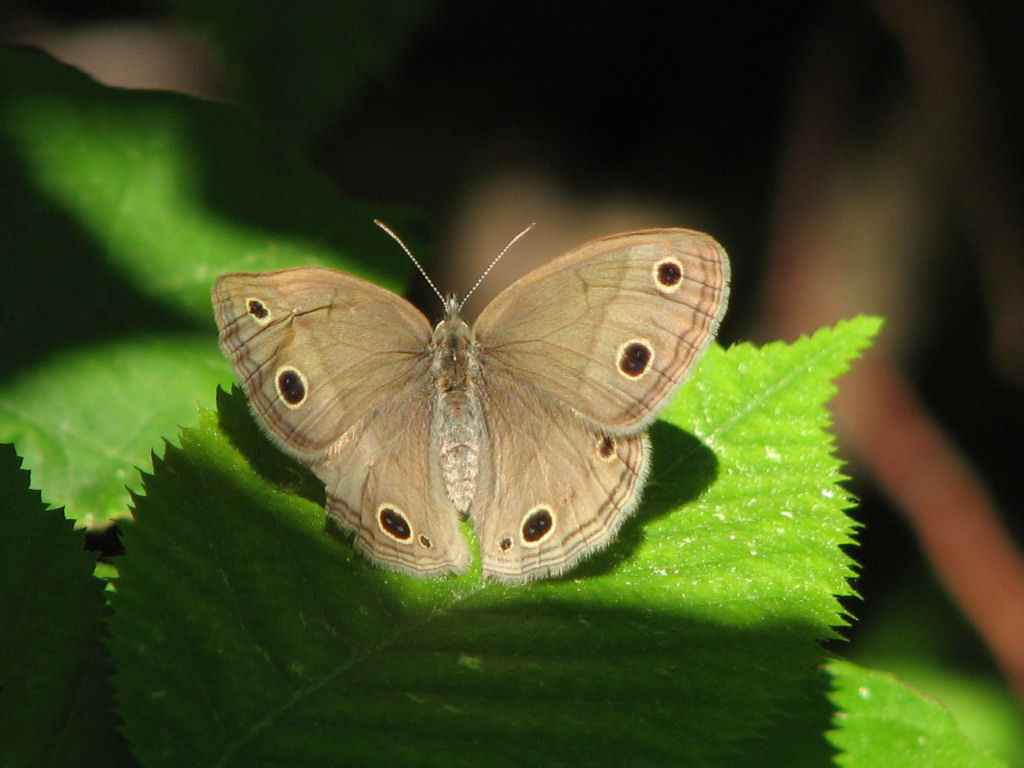
- Little wood satyr, Ottawa, Ontario, Canada

Scientific classification
- Kingdom: Animalia
- Phylum: Arthropoda
- Class: Insecta
- Order: Lepidoptera
- Family: Nymphalidae
- Subfamily: Satyrinae
- Tribe: Satyrini
- Subtribe: Euptychiina
- Genus: Megisto; Hübner, [1819]

Species
- See text

= Megisto =

Genus of butterflies

Megisto is a genus of butterflies of the subfamily Satyrinae in the family Nymphalidae.

== Species ==
- Megisto cymela (Cramer, [1777]) – little wood satyr
  - Megisto cymela viola (Maynard, 1891) – Viola's wood satyr
- Megisto rubricata (Edwards, 1871) – red satyr [US (New Mexico, Oklahoma), Mexico, Guatemala]
