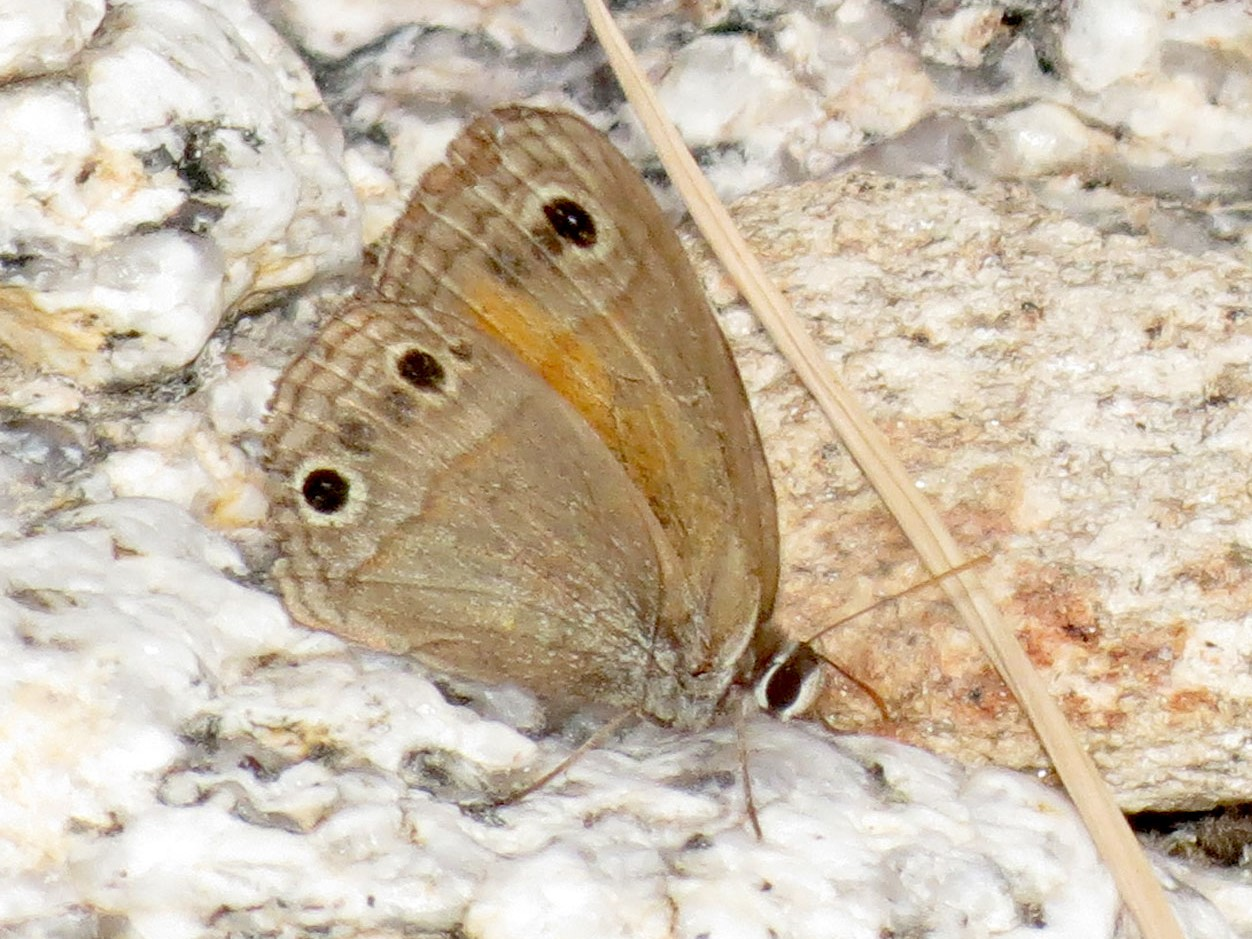

Scientific classification
- Domain: Eukaryota
- Kingdom: Animalia
- Phylum: Arthropoda
- Class: Insecta
- Order: Lepidoptera
- Family: Nymphalidae
- Genus: Cissia
- Species: C. rubricata

Binomial name
- Cissia rubricata (W.H. Edwards, 1871)

Synonyms
- Megisto rubricata (Edwards, 1871); Euptychia rubricata

= Cissia rubricata =

Species of butterfly

Cissia rubricata, the red satyr, is a butterfly in the family Nymphalidae described by William Henry Edwards in 1871. It is found in North America.
