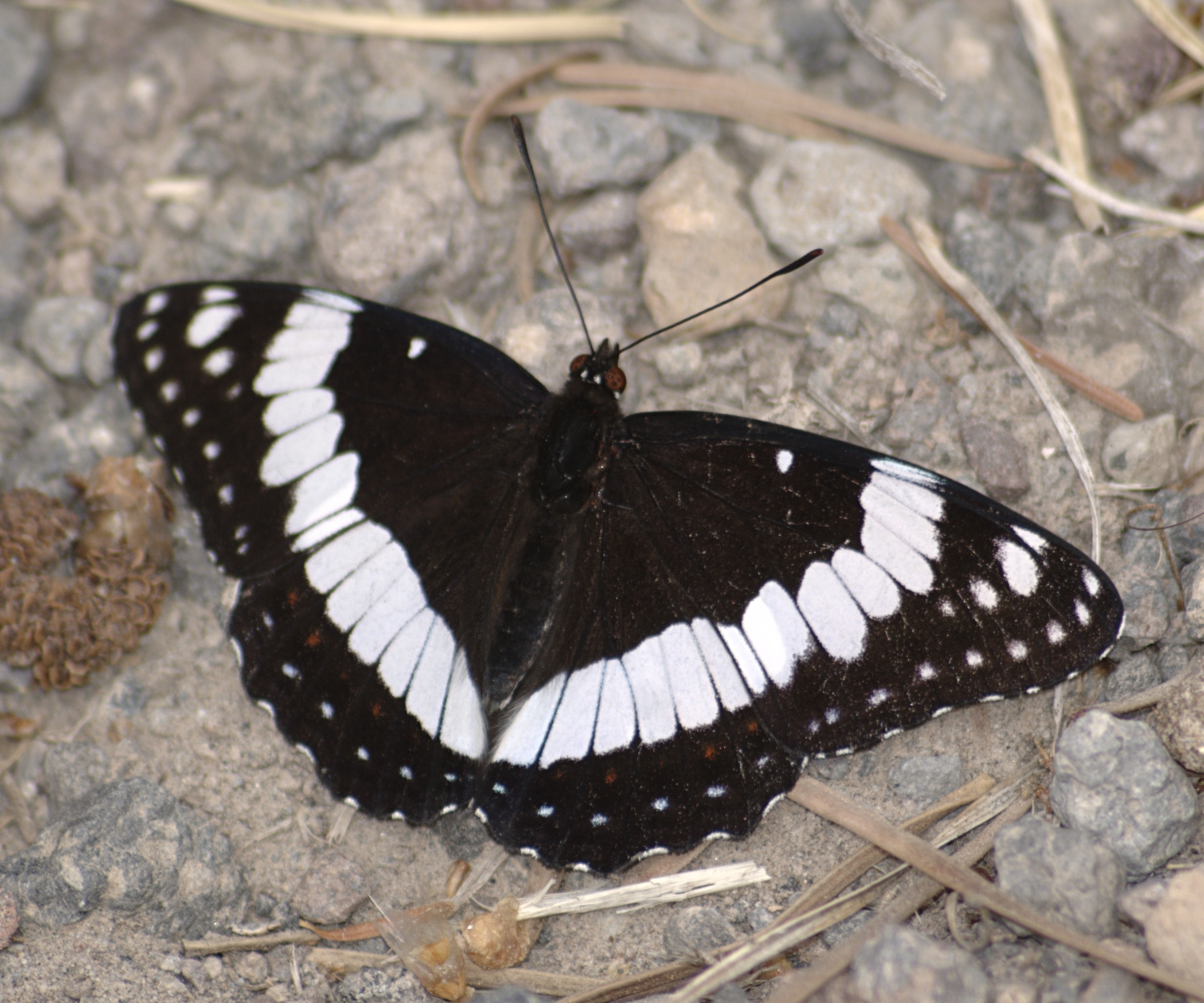

Conservation status
- Secure (NatureServe)

- Least Concern (IUCN 3.1)

Scientific classification
- Kingdom: Animalia
- Phylum: Arthropoda
- Clade: Pancrustacea
- Class: Insecta
- Order: Lepidoptera
- Family: Nymphalidae
- Genus: Limenitis
- Species: L. weidemeyerii

Binomial name
- Limenitis weidemeyerii (W. H. Edwards, 1861)

Synonyms
- Basilarchia weidechippus

= Limenitis weidemeyerii =

Species of butterfly

Limenitis weidemeyerii, or Weidemeyer's admiral, is a butterfly from the subfamily Nymphalinae, found in western North America.

== Distribution ==
Limenitis weidemeyerii is found in western Canada, the northern Great Plains (an outlying population), and the Western United States, from the Rocky Mountains westward to the Sierra Nevada and California. It is named after John William Weidemeyer, a 19th-century entomologist whose specimen from the Rocky Mountains was used to describe the species.

== Description ==
The Weidemeyer's admiral's wings are black and white on the dorsal side, with rows of white spots across the wings. On the ventral side, the black is replaced by brown with gray markings along the margins of the hindwing. The larvae feed on aspen and cottonwood (Populus), willows (Salix), oceanspray (Holodiscus), and shadbush (Amelanchier). Adults feed on tree sap, carrion, and flower nectar.

== Similar species ==
- White admiral (two subspecies of Limenitis arthemis)
- Lorquin's admiral (Limenitis lorquini)
