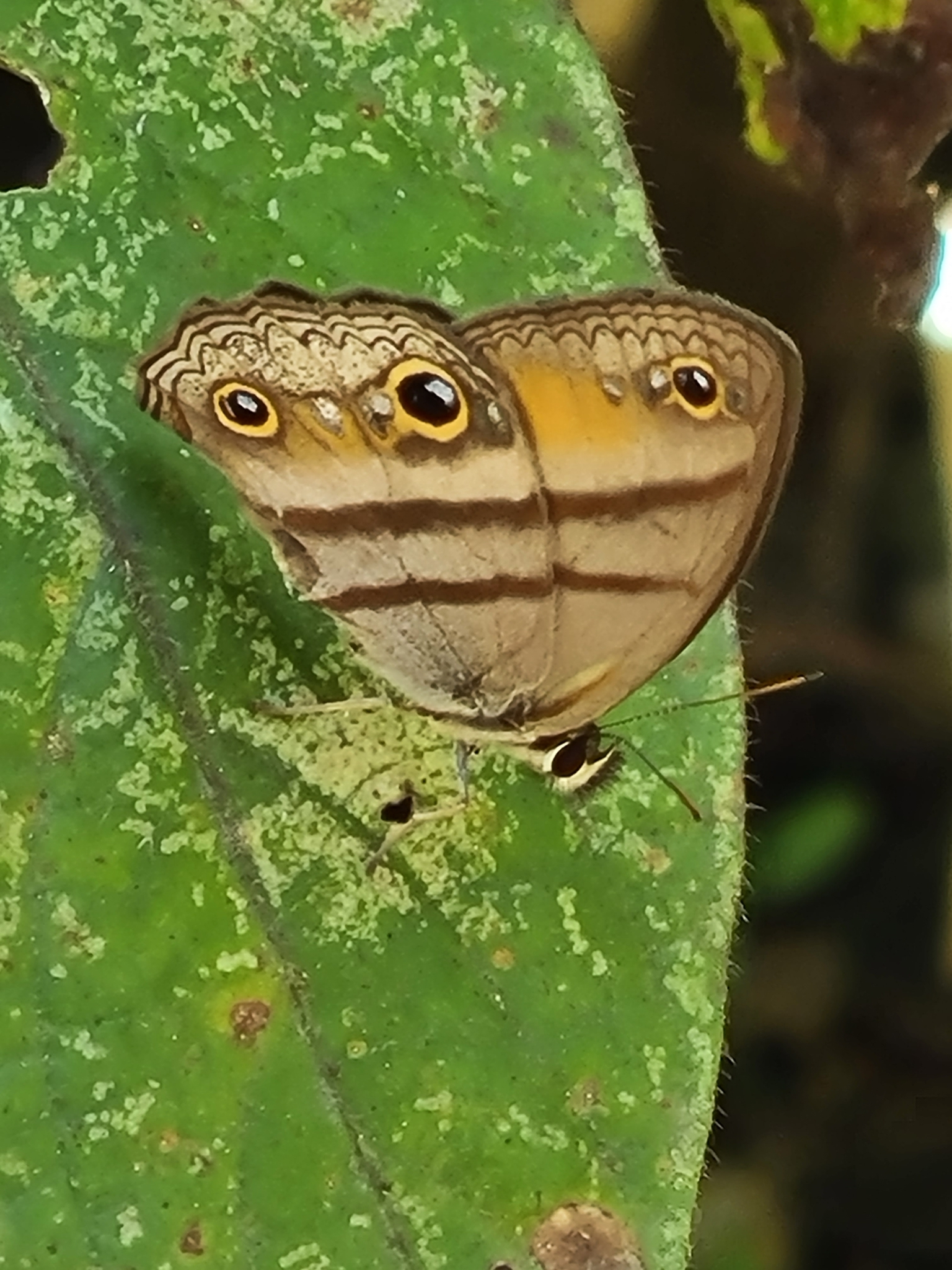

Scientific classification
- Kingdom: Animalia
- Phylum: Arthropoda
- Class: Insecta
- Order: Lepidoptera
- Family: Nymphalidae
- Genus: Cissia
- Species: C. penelope

Binomial name
- Cissia penelope (Fabricius, 1775)

= Cissia penelope =

Penelope's ringlet

Species of butterfly

Cissia penelope, also known by its common name Penelope's ringlet, is a species of butterfly from the genus Cissia.
