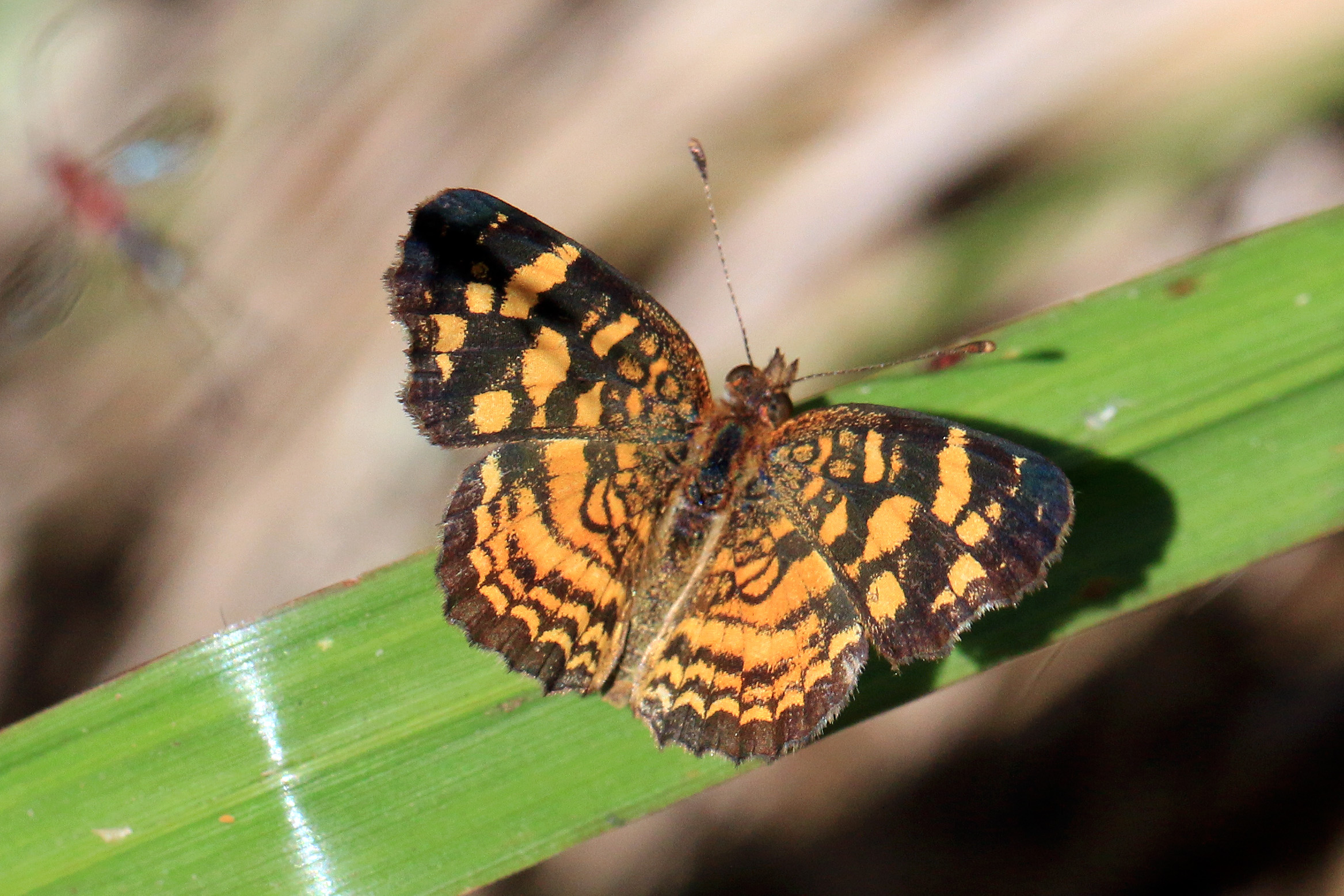
- A. f. frisia
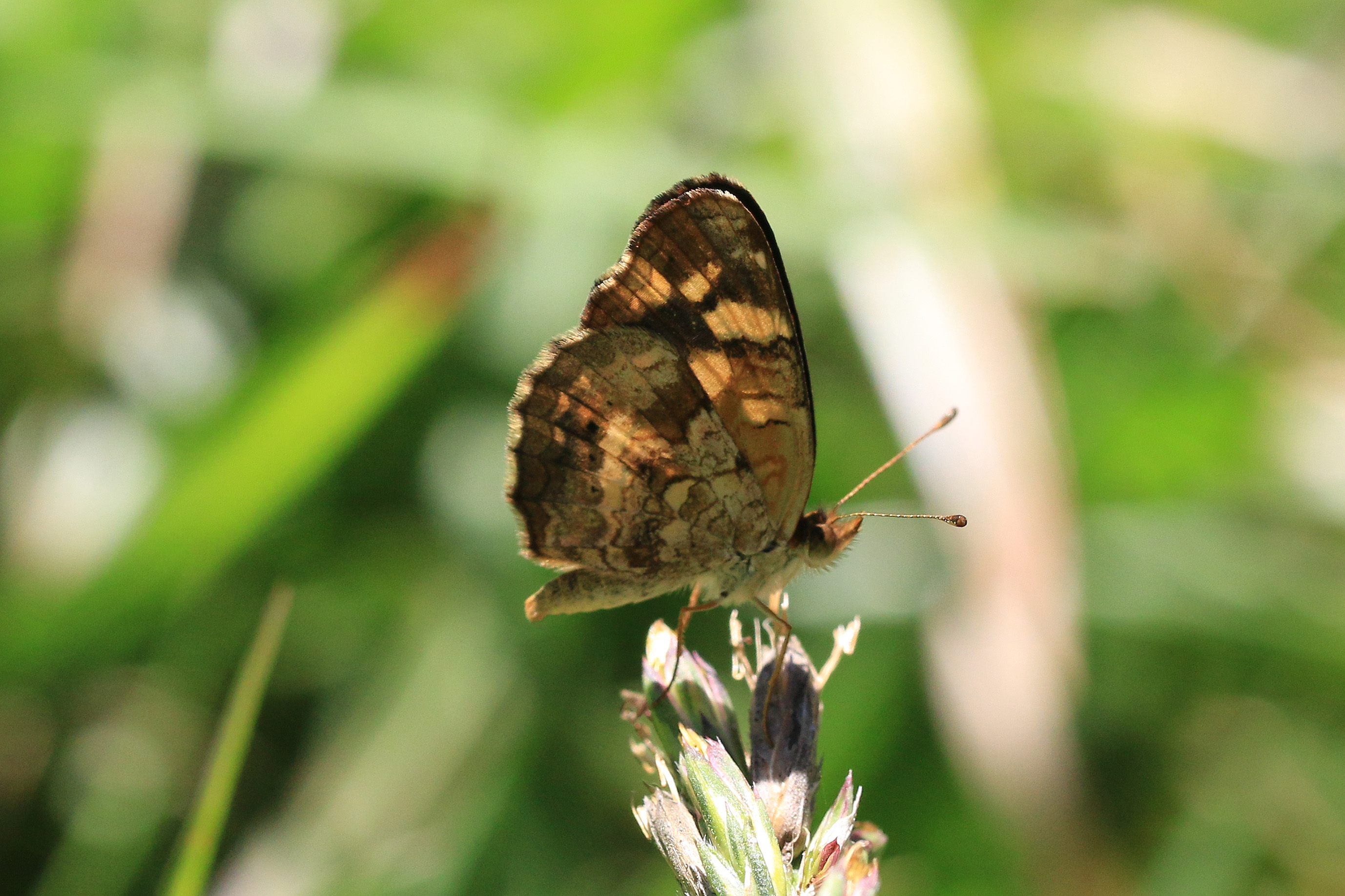
- A. f. frisia both in Cuba

Scientific classification
- Domain: Eukaryota
- Kingdom: Animalia
- Phylum: Arthropoda
- Class: Insecta
- Order: Lepidoptera
- Family: Nymphalidae
- Genus: Anthanassa
- Species: A. frisia

Binomial name
- Anthanassa frisia (Poey, 1832)

Synonyms
- Melitea frisia Poey, 1832; Eresia frisia Hewitson, [1866]; Phyciodes frisia; Eresia gyges Hewitson, [1864]; Eresia hermas Hewitson, [1864]; Eresia conferta C. & R. Felder, [1867]; Phyciodes brancodia Schaus, 1902; Phyciodes aequatorialis Röber, 1913; Phyciodes aequatorialis gisela Röber, 1913; Phyciodes taeniata Röber, 1913; Anthanassa taeniata; Anthanassa dubia; Melitaea tulcis Bates, 1864; Eresia genigueh Reakirt, 1865; Eresia archesilea R. Felder, 1869; Eresia punctata Edwards, 1870; Phyciodes tulcis; Anthanassa tulcis

= Anthanassa frisia =

Species of butterfly

Anthanassa frisia, the Cuban crescentspot, Cuban checkerspot or Cuban crescent, is a butterfly of the family Nymphalidae. Subspecies tulcis is known by the common names pale-banded crescent or Tulcis crescent; it is treated as a species by some authors.

== Subspecies ==
- Anthanassa frisia frisia (West Indies, Florida)
- Anthanassa frisia hermas (Brazil (Pernambuco, Bahia, São Paulo, Mato Grosso), Paraguay, northern Argentina, Ecuador)
- Anthanassa frisia taeniata (Ecuador, western Peru)
- Anthanassa frisia dubia (coasts of Venezuela and Colombia)
- Anthanassa frisia tulcis (Texas, Arizona, Mexico, Guatemala to Panama)

== Description ==
The wingspan of subspecies frisia is 32–45 mm. Adults are on wing most of the year in southern Florida and throughout the year in the tropics. Subspecies tulcis has a wingspan of 32–35 mm. Adults are on wing from May to November in southern Texas.

== Distribution ==
The nominate subspecies is found in the West Indies and southern Florida, with strays to northern Florida. Subspecies tulcis is found from Argentina north through Central America and Mexico to southern Texas, strays to west Texas and southern Arizona. Other subspecies are resident to South America.

== Ecology ==
Larvae of subspecies frisia feed on Beloperone guttata, while tulcis larvae have been recorded on Dicliptera species. Other recorded food plants include Ruellia species. Adults feed on flower nectar.

== Gallery ==
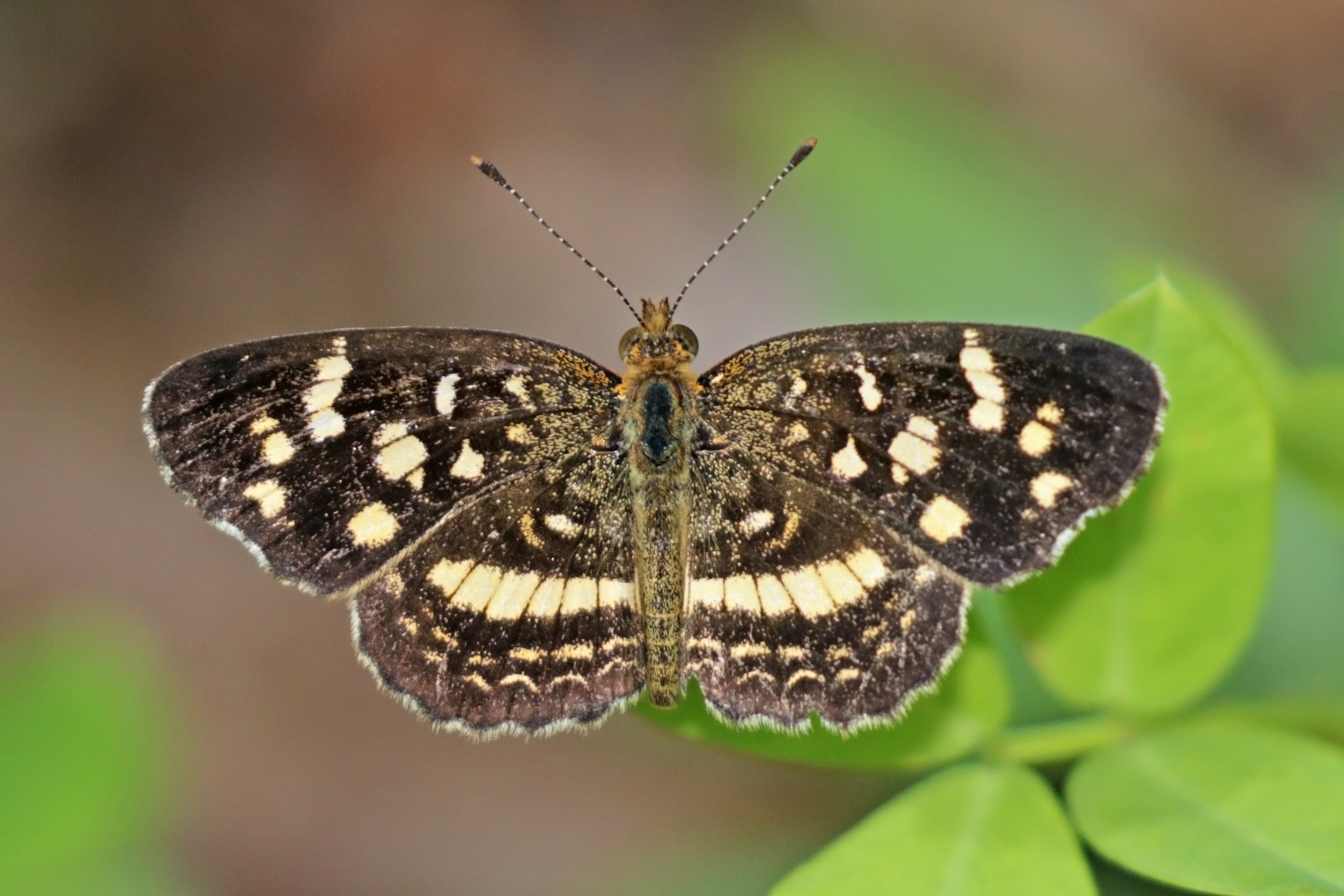
A. f. tulcis, or A. tulcis, male, Panama

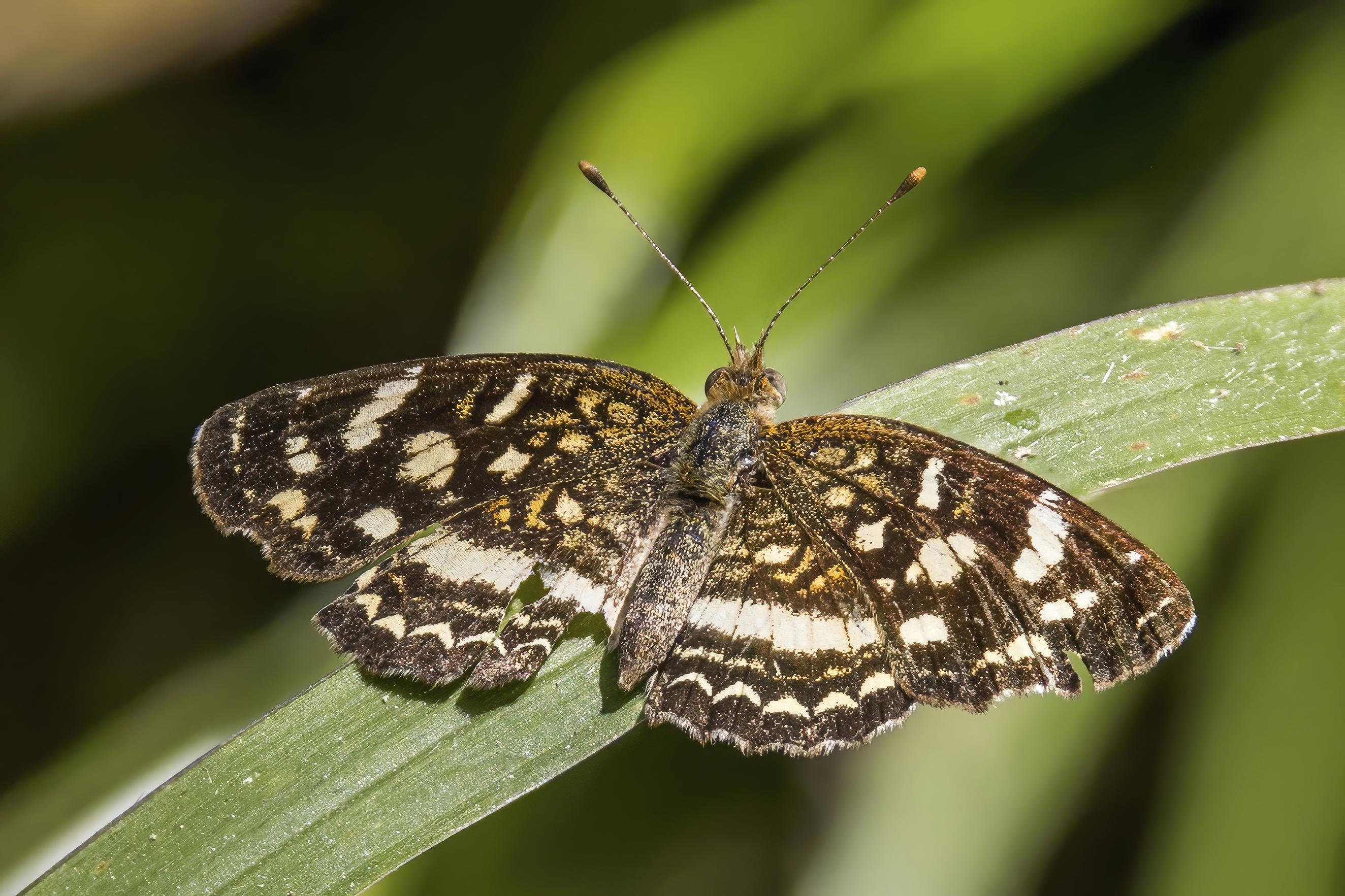
A. f. tulcis, female, Belize

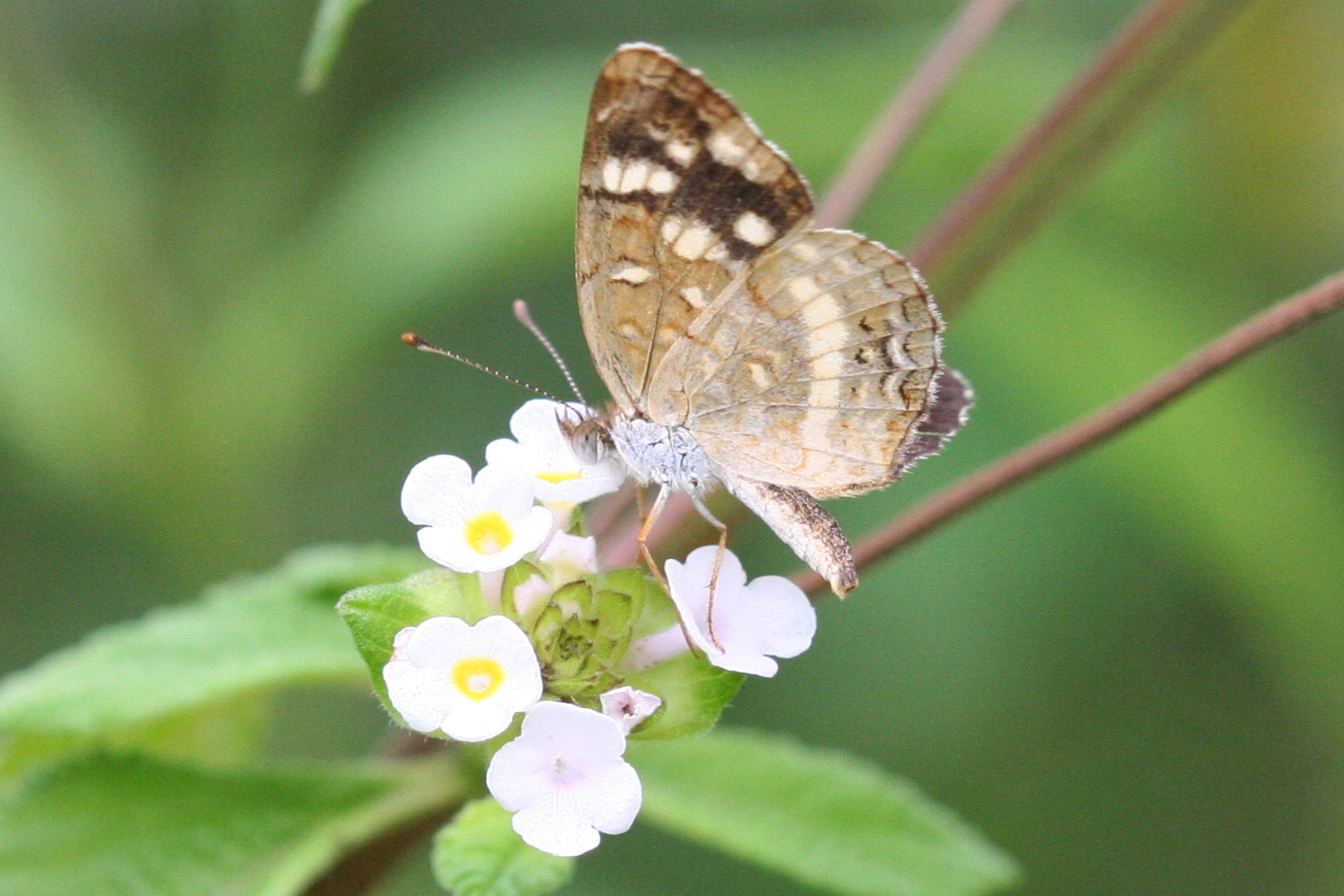
A. f. tulcis

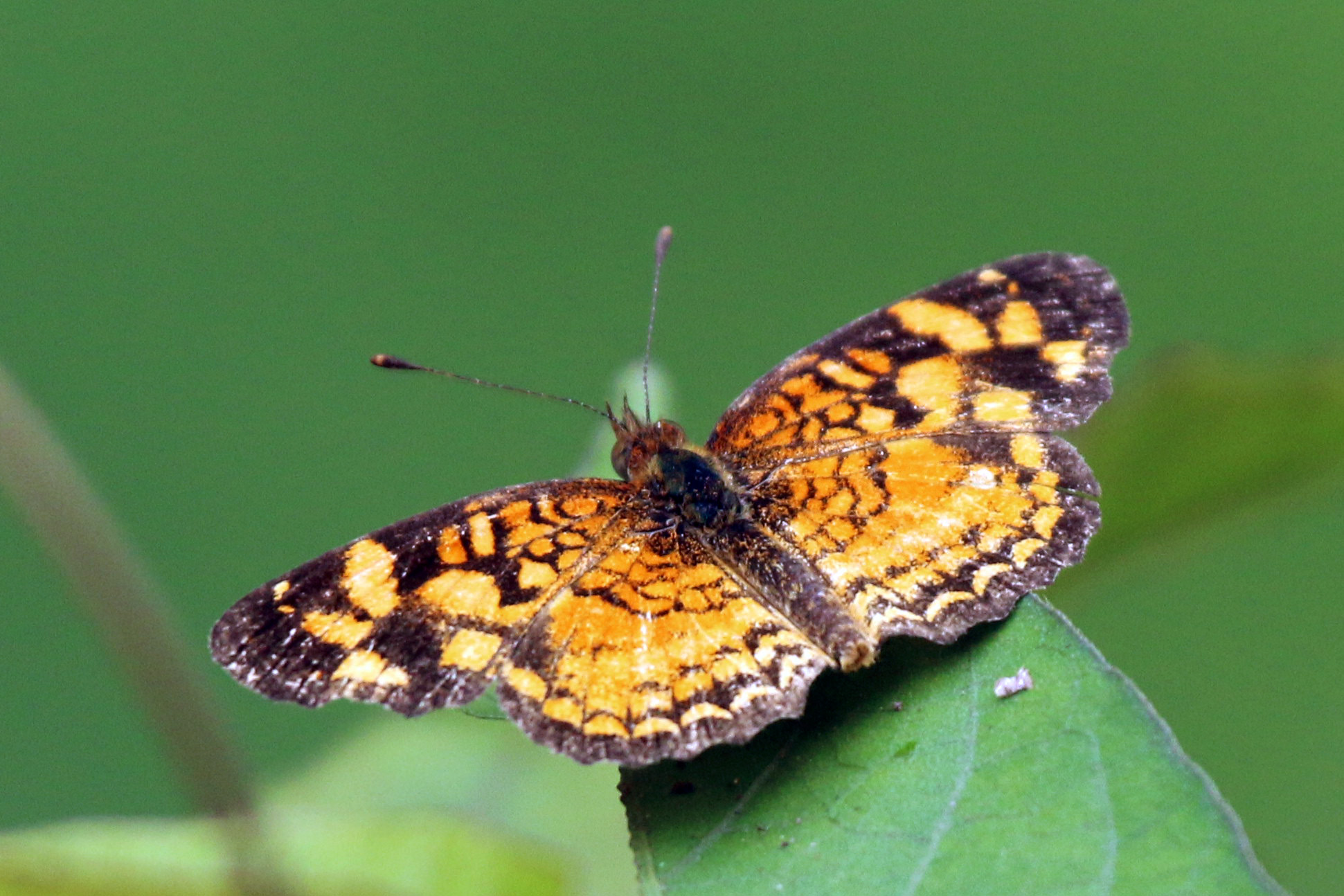
A. f. frisia, Jamaica

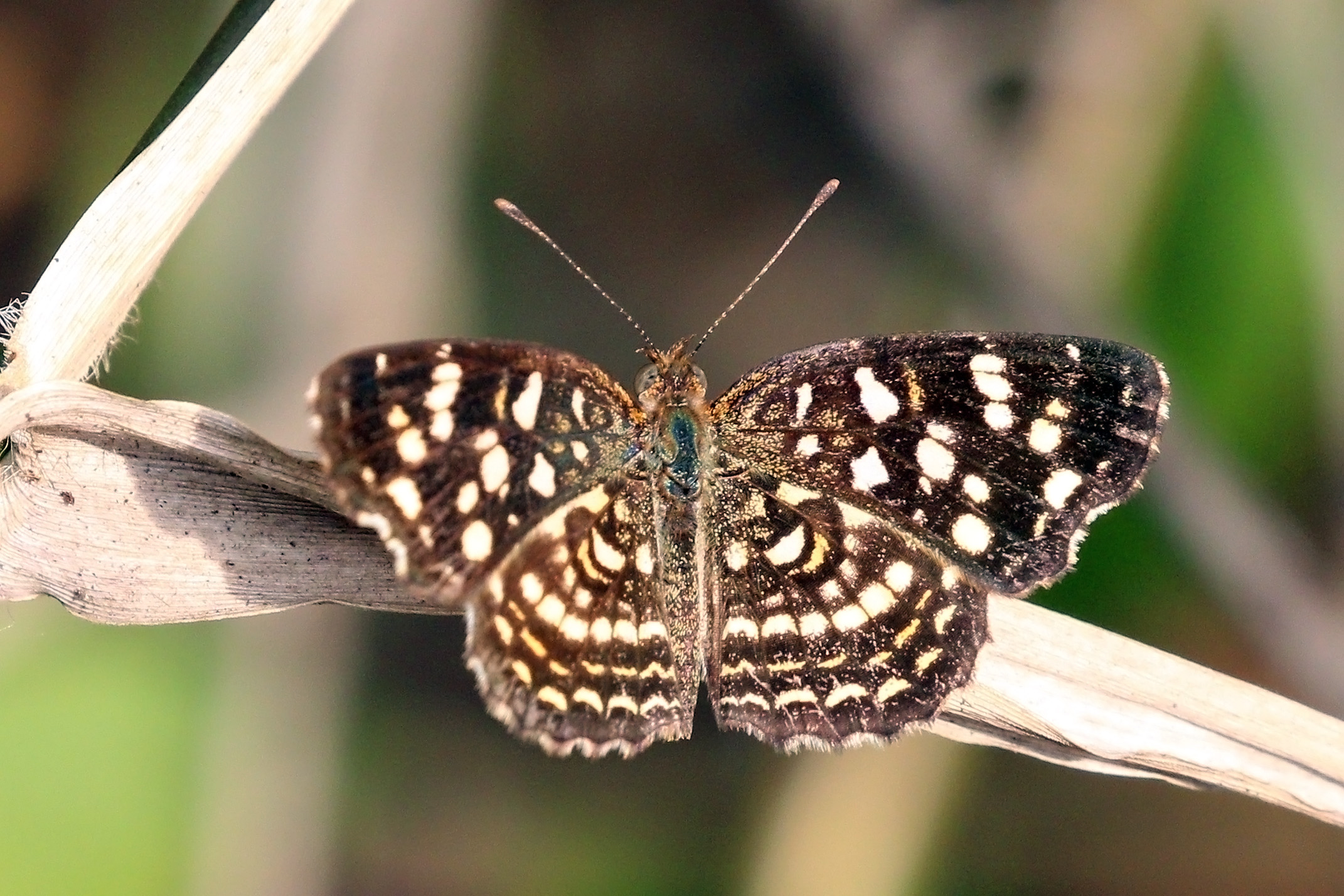
A. f. hermas, Brazil
