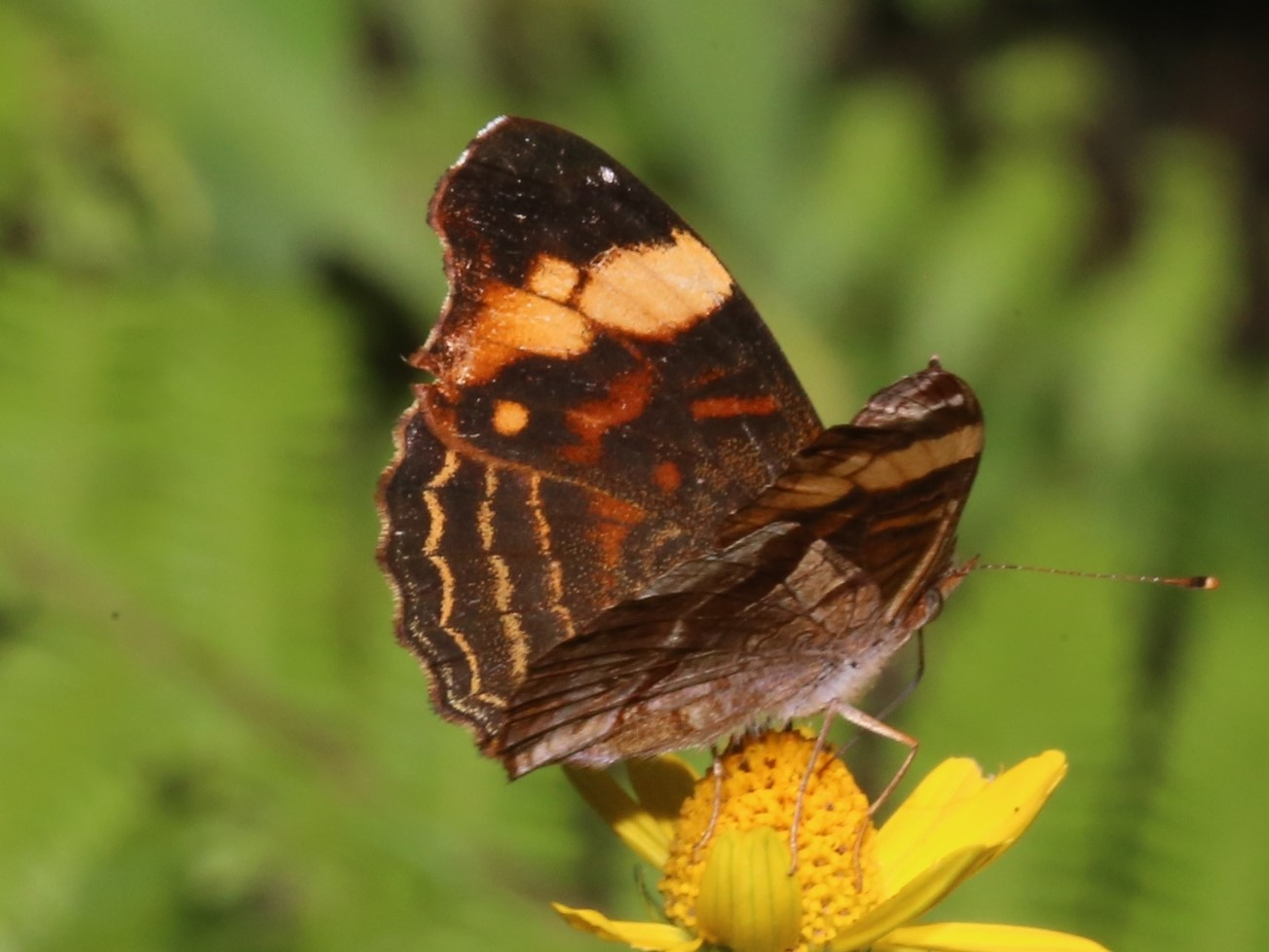

Scientific classification
- Domain: Eukaryota
- Kingdom: Animalia
- Phylum: Arthropoda
- Class: Insecta
- Order: Lepidoptera
- Family: Nymphalidae
- Genus: Anthanassa
- Species: A. crithona

Binomial name
- Anthanassa crithona (Salvin, 1871)

= Anthanassa crithona =

Species of butterfly

Anthanassa crithona, commonly known as the crithona crescent, is a species of butterfly in the family Nymphalidae. It is found in tropical America.
