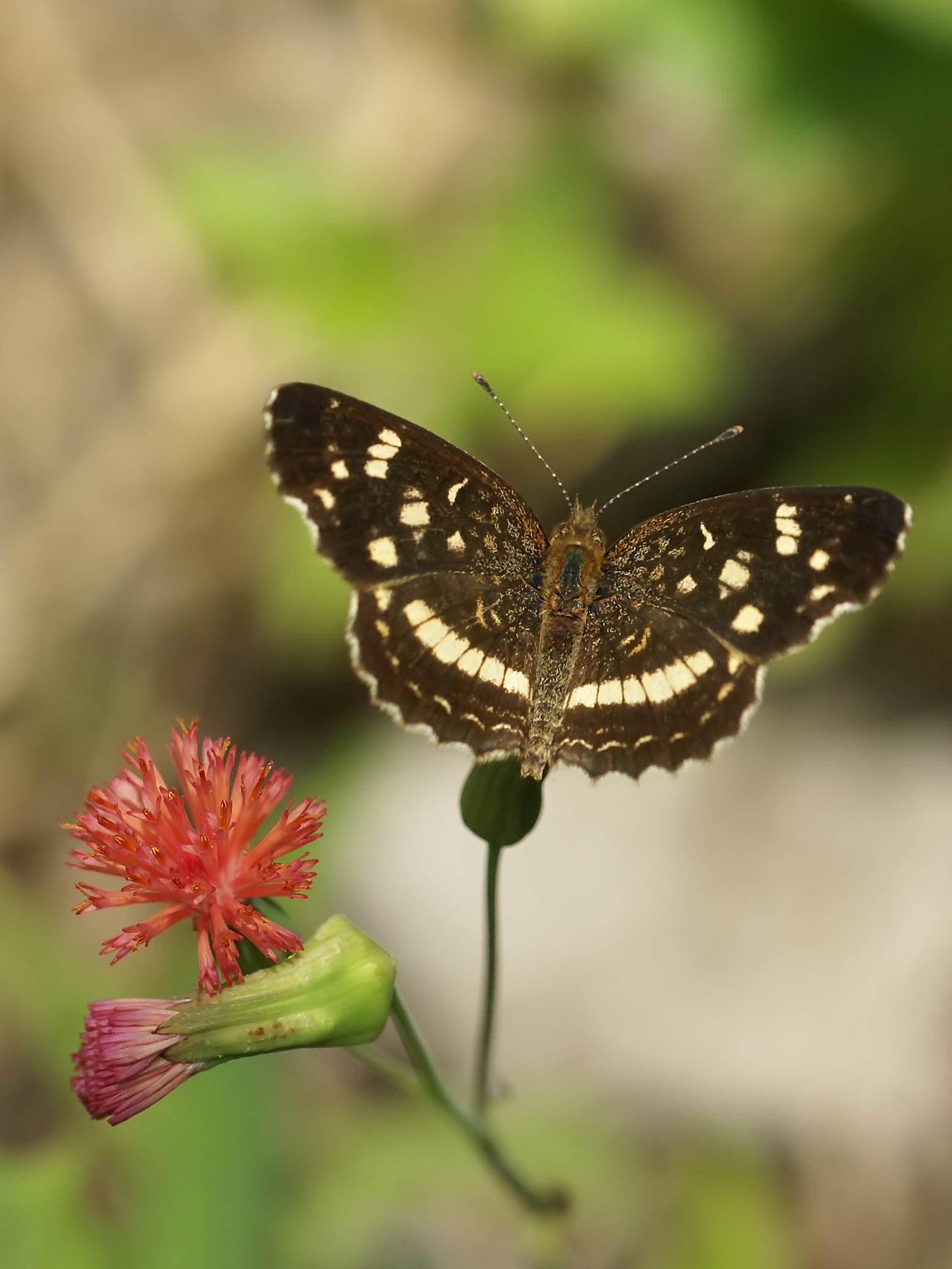
- Male, Costa Rica
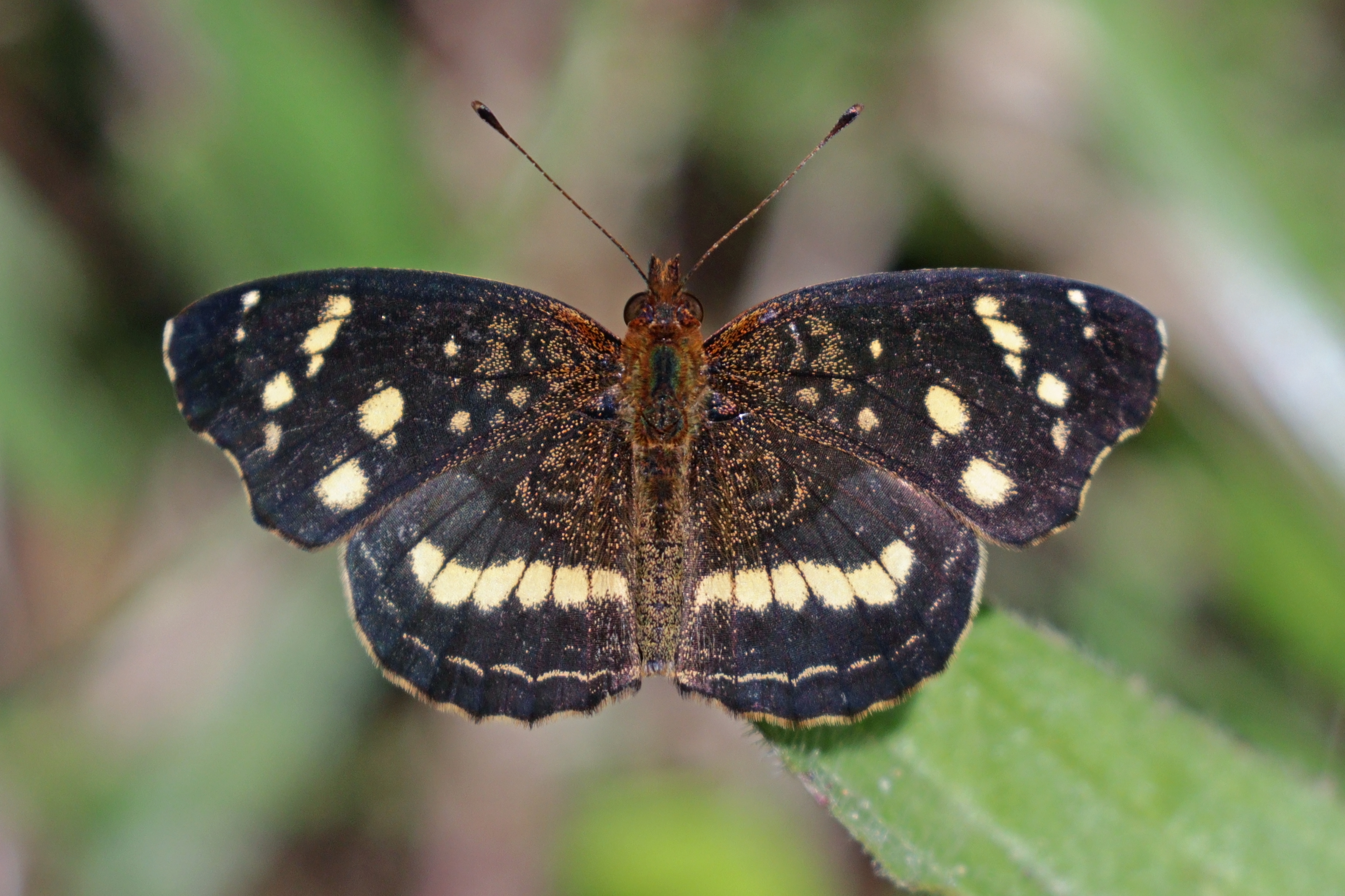
- Female, Panama

Scientific classification
- Domain: Eukaryota
- Kingdom: Animalia
- Phylum: Arthropoda
- Class: Insecta
- Order: Lepidoptera
- Family: Nymphalidae
- Genus: Anthanassa
- Species: A. ardys

Binomial name
- Anthanassa ardys (Hewitson, [1864])

Synonyms
- Eresia ardys Hewitson, [1864]; Phyciodes ardys (Hewitson, [1864]); Phyciodes subota Godman & Salvin, 1878

= Anthanassa ardys =

Ardys crescent

Species of butterfly

Anthanassa ardys, the Ardys crescent, is a butterfly of the family Nymphalidae. It is found from southern Mexico, through Central America to Colombia. In elevational abundance patterns based in Oaxaca, Mexico, Anthanassa ardys are typically present at mid elevation levels, with records showing they lack in areas of lower and higher elevations.

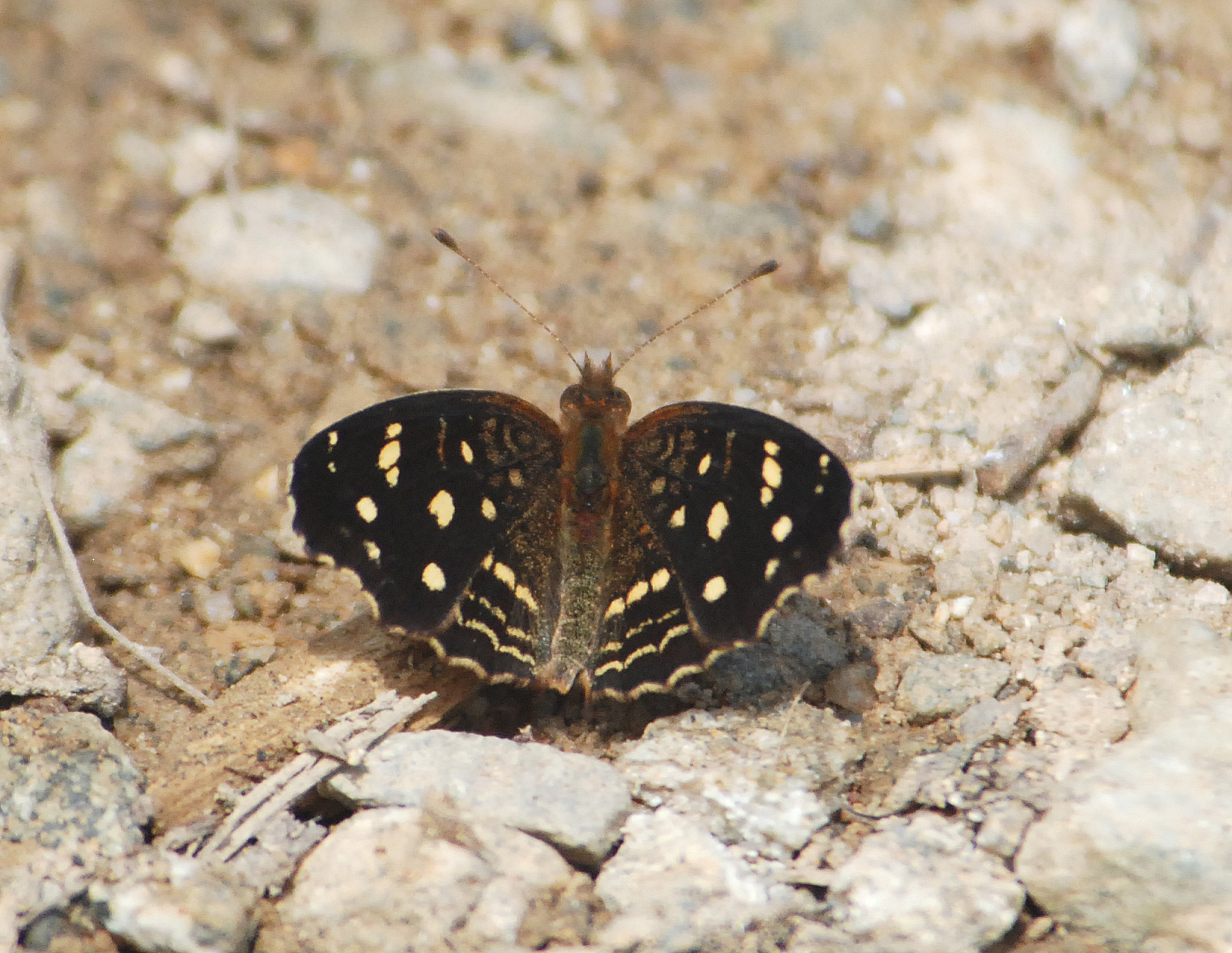

== Subspecies ==
- Anthanassa ardys ardys (southern Mexico, Nicaragua, Costa Rica, Colombia)
- Anthanassa ardys subota (Guatemala: Polochic Valley, Costa Rica)
