= Good Shepherd Church =

Historic church in West Virginia, United States

- U.S. National Register of Historic Places
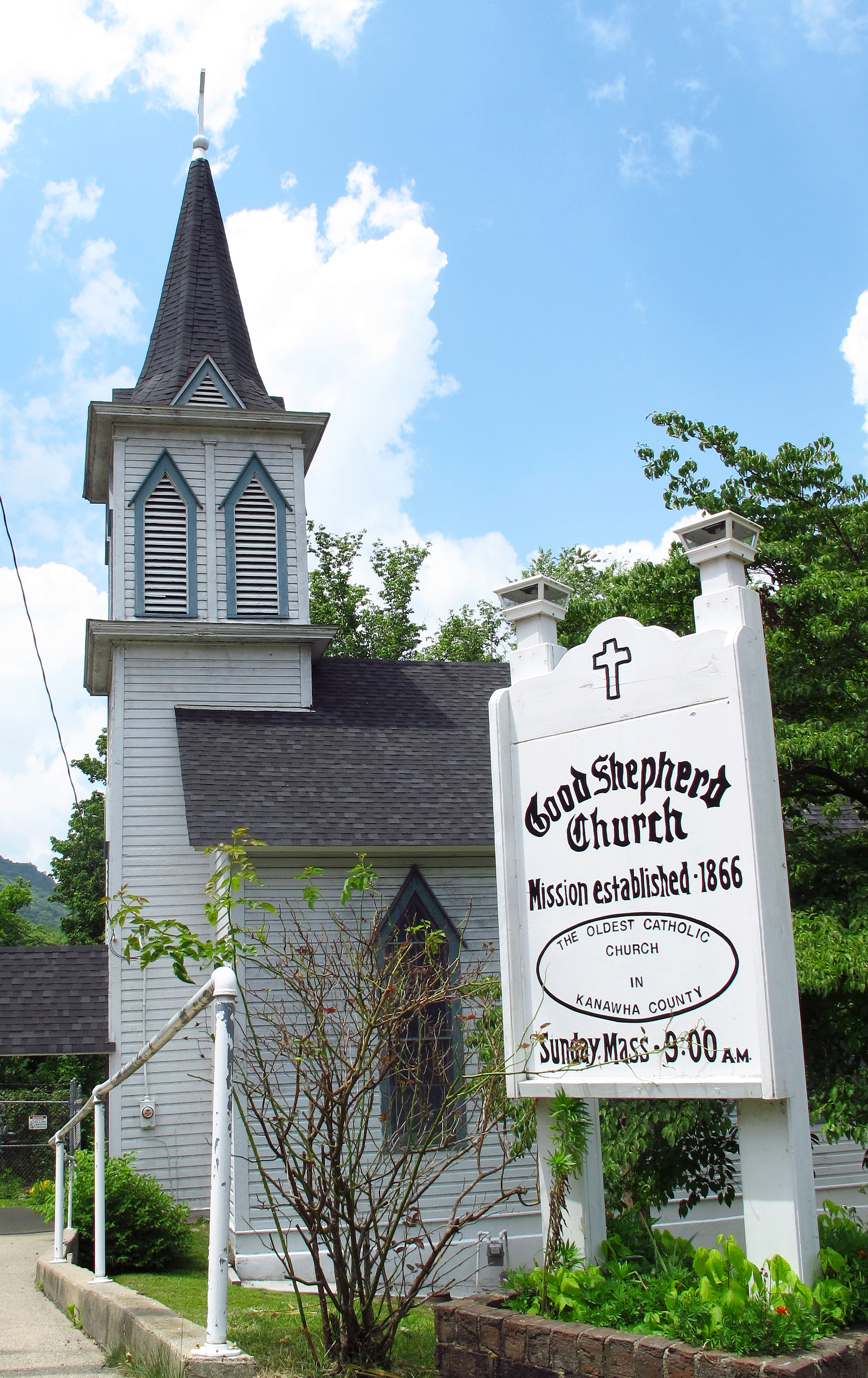

- Location within West Virginia Location within the United States
- Location: SR 61 SW of East Bank, Coalburg, West Virginia
- Coordinates: 38°12′37″N 81°27′22″W
- Area: 1 acre (0.40 ha)
- Built: 1877
- Architect: Canterbury, John; Thompson, Andy
- Architectural style: Gothic Revival
- NRHP reference No.: 90000712
- Added to NRHP: April 26, 1990

Good Shepherd Church, also known as Good Shepherd Mission, is a historic Roman Catholic church at SR 61 SW of East Bank Coalburg, Kanawha County, West Virginia. It was built about 1880, and consists of a five bay, one-story ell with a steeply pitched front gabled roof. It sits on a high raised limestone foundation. Also on the property is an ornate Celtic cross that rests on earth from County Kerry, Ireland, and was placed there in 1912. The church is significant in part due to its association with Irish and Italian immigrant miners during the early years of the church.

It was listed on the National Register of Historic Places in 1990.
