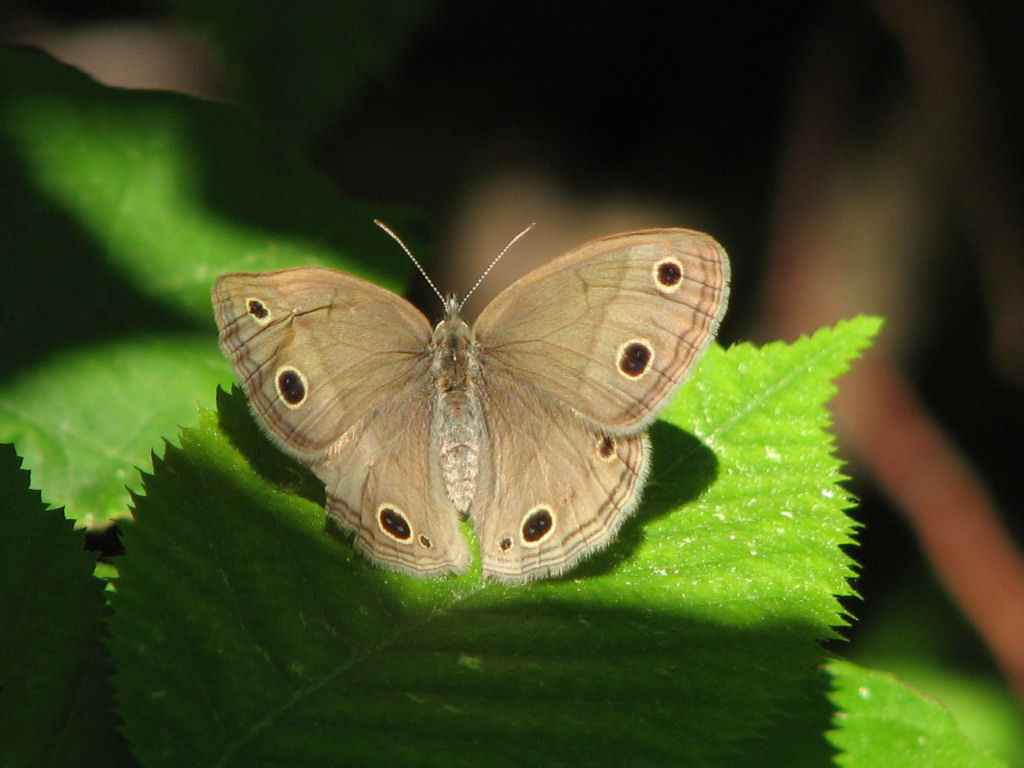
- Dorsal view

Conservation status
- Secure (NatureServe)

Scientific classification
- Kingdom: Animalia
- Phylum: Arthropoda
- Clade: Pancrustacea
- Class: Insecta
- Order: Lepidoptera
- Family: Nymphalidae
- Genus: Megisto
- Species: M. cymela

Binomial name
- Megisto cymela (Cramer, 1777)

Subspecies
- M. c. cymela; M. c. viola (Maynard, 1891)

Synonyms
- Papilio cymela; Papilio eurytus Fabricius 1775 (invalid junior homonym of Papilio eurytus Linnaeus 1758); Papilio eurytris Fabricius 1793 (junior synonym of Papilio cymela Cramer 1775)

= Megisto cymela =

Species of butterfly

Megisto cymela, the Little Wood Satyr, is a butterfly species of the Satyrinae subfamily that occurs in North America.

== Description ==
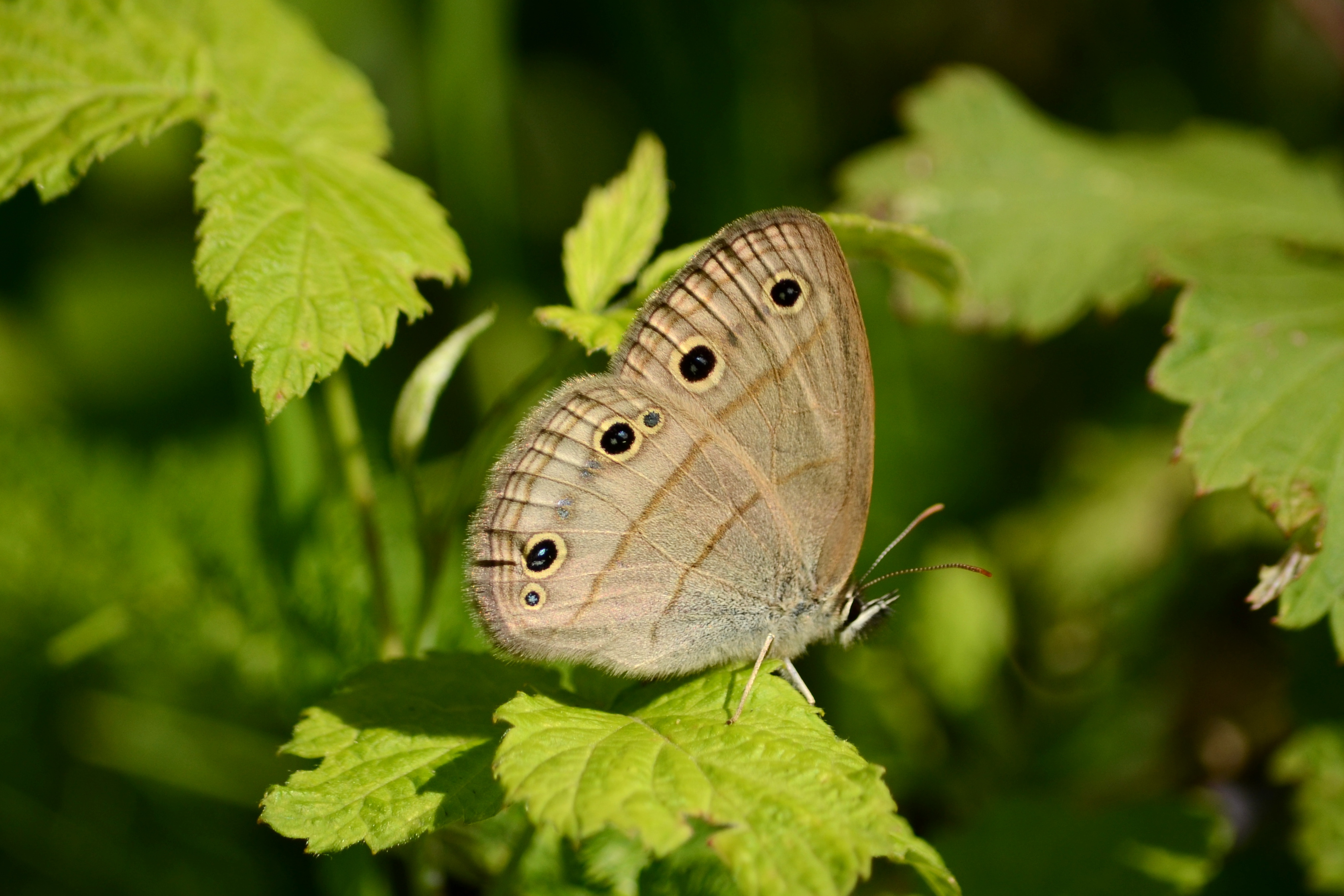
Ventral view

Adult

The wingspan is 29–48 mm. The forewing has two yellow-rimmed black eyespots on both sides, dorsal and ventral. The hindwing has two spots on the dorsal side but have smaller spots on the ventral. The other all color is light brown. While it has similar markings, the Little Wood Satyr is slightly larger than the Hermeuptychia sosybius.

Caterpillar

The body is light greenish brown with a dark dorsal line and alternating brown and yellowish lateral stripes. The surface of the caterpillar has bumps, these bumps bear short reddish-brown hairs. The head is dirty white while the tail hairs are light gray.

The wood satyr is part of the typically Neotropical subtribe Euptychiina. It can be observed in forests, usually along the edges and in brush-filled openings along cleared forest roads. It has also been observed in grassy areas usually between forested patches. It flies near the ground, twisting between and through grasses, small trees and bushes. Collectors have found it often difficult to capture, though it appears to be a slow flyer at first glance. This butterfly prefers habitat that is open, contains deciduous trees along with marshy areas and possessing brushy cover.

== Range and habitat ==
They are seen in the eastern United States and southeastern Canada, from Nova Scotia south into Florida, west to Texas, Saskatchewan and Wyoming. As the name implies the Little Wood Satyr is most commonly seen in woods and shrubby areas.

Megisto cymela viola is often mentioned as a subspecies that has some subtle visual differences and is located in the more southern areas of its range, but there is disagreement over which populations are referable to this subspecies.

== Life cycle ==
Adults in the northern portions of their range fly between June and July while their southern populations fly between March and September. Adults have a slow "bouncing" flight but they will rise as far as the top of tall trees. Females lay eggs singly on blades of grass or at the base of tree trunks. The fourth-instar caterpillars hibernate in leaf litter and emerge in May. They continue feeding through their final instar and then pupate for 8 days.

=== Larval foods ===
- Orchard Grass (Cock's-foot) Dactylis glomerata
- Kentucky Bluegrass Poa pratensis
- Centipede Grass Eremochloa ophiuroides

=== Adult foods ===
Adults mainly consume plant sap, aphid honeydew, and fruit. They rarely visit flowers.

== Bibliography ==
- "Species Megisto cymela - Little Wood Satyr - BugGuide.net".
- "Megisto Hübner, [1819]" at Markku Savela's Lepidoptera and Some Other Life Forms
- "Species Detail Butterflies and Moths of North America". Archived from the original on 2009-07-16.
