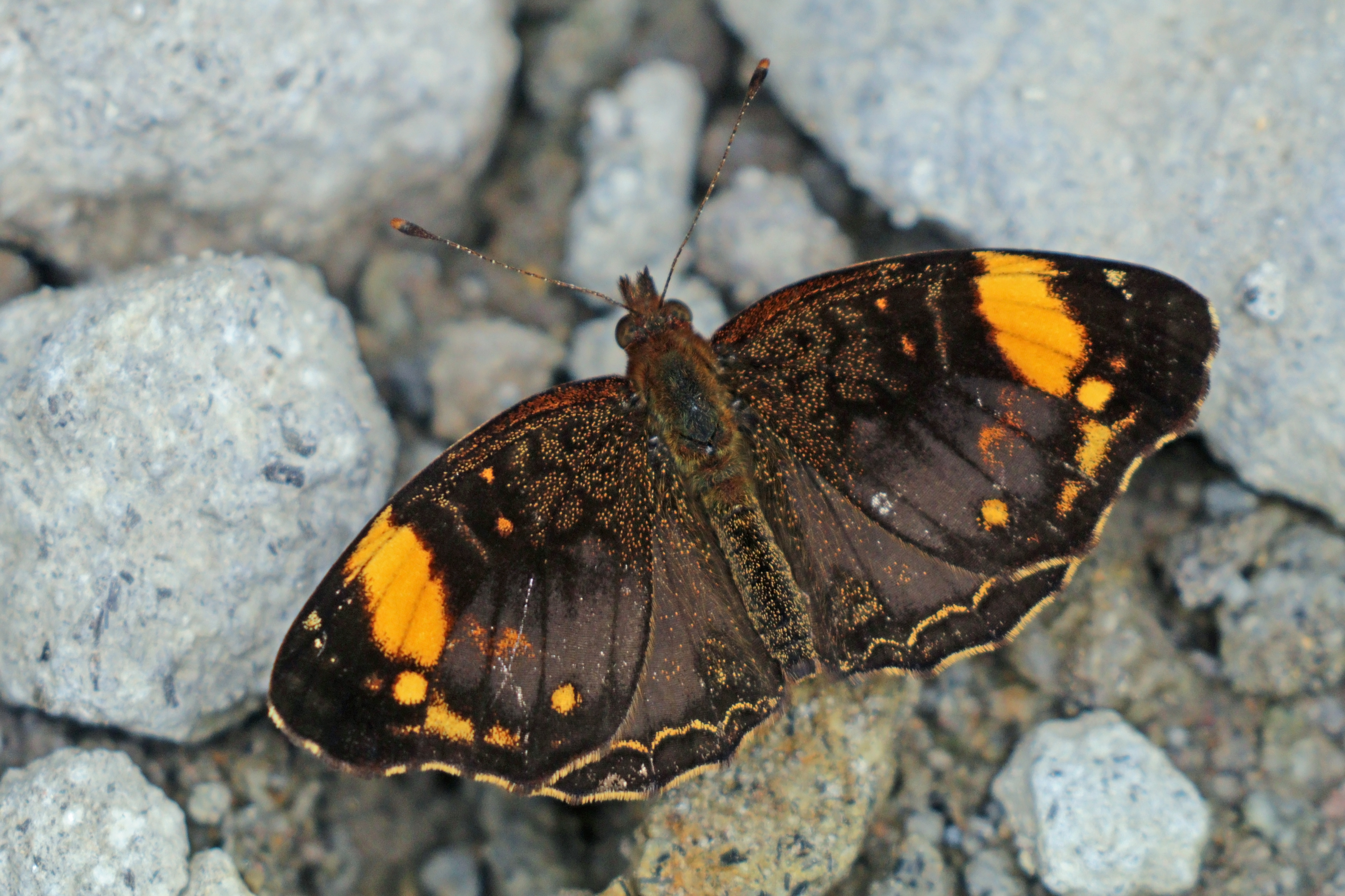
- Blackened crescent Anthanassa otanes fulviplaga, Panama
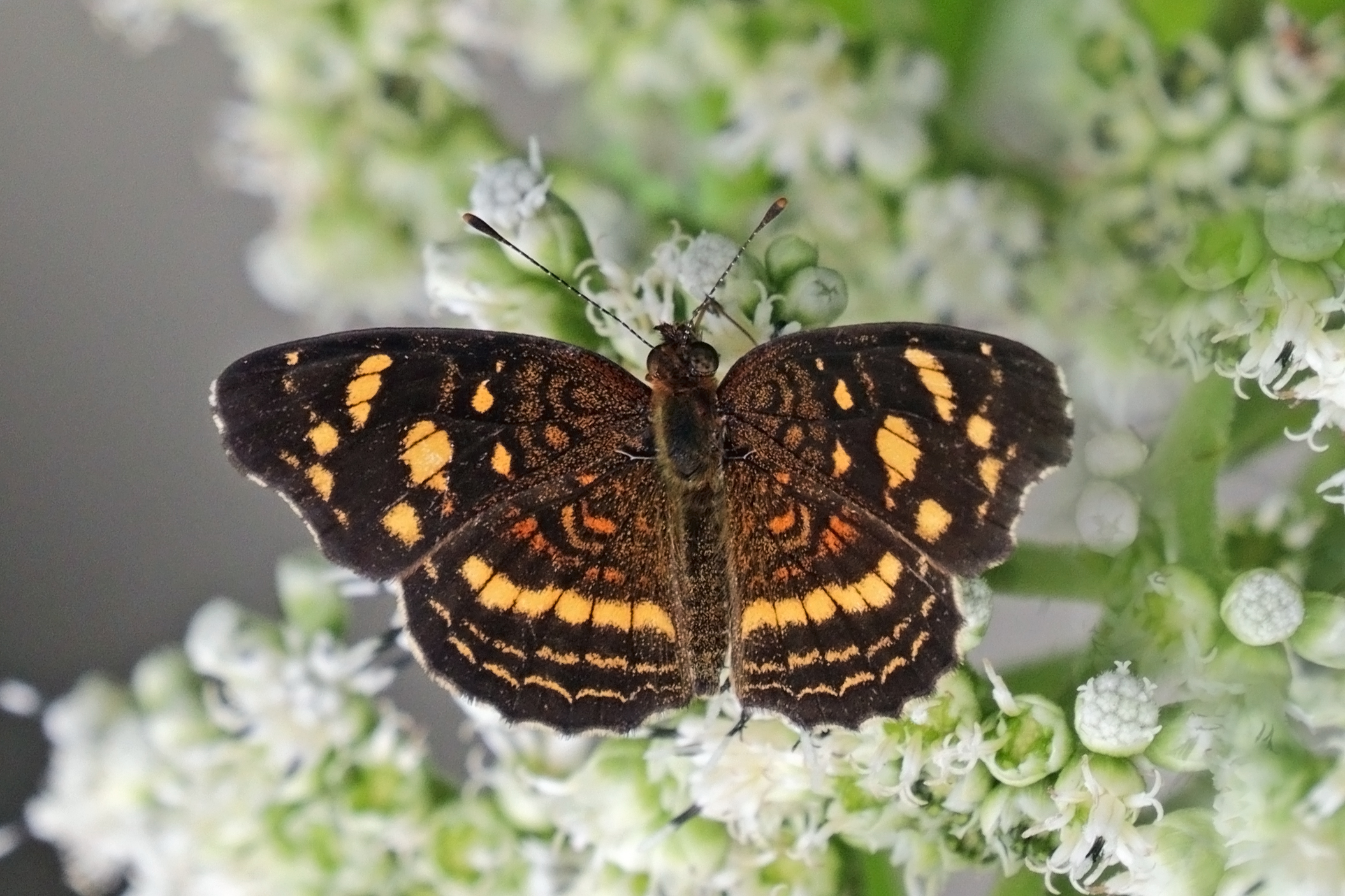

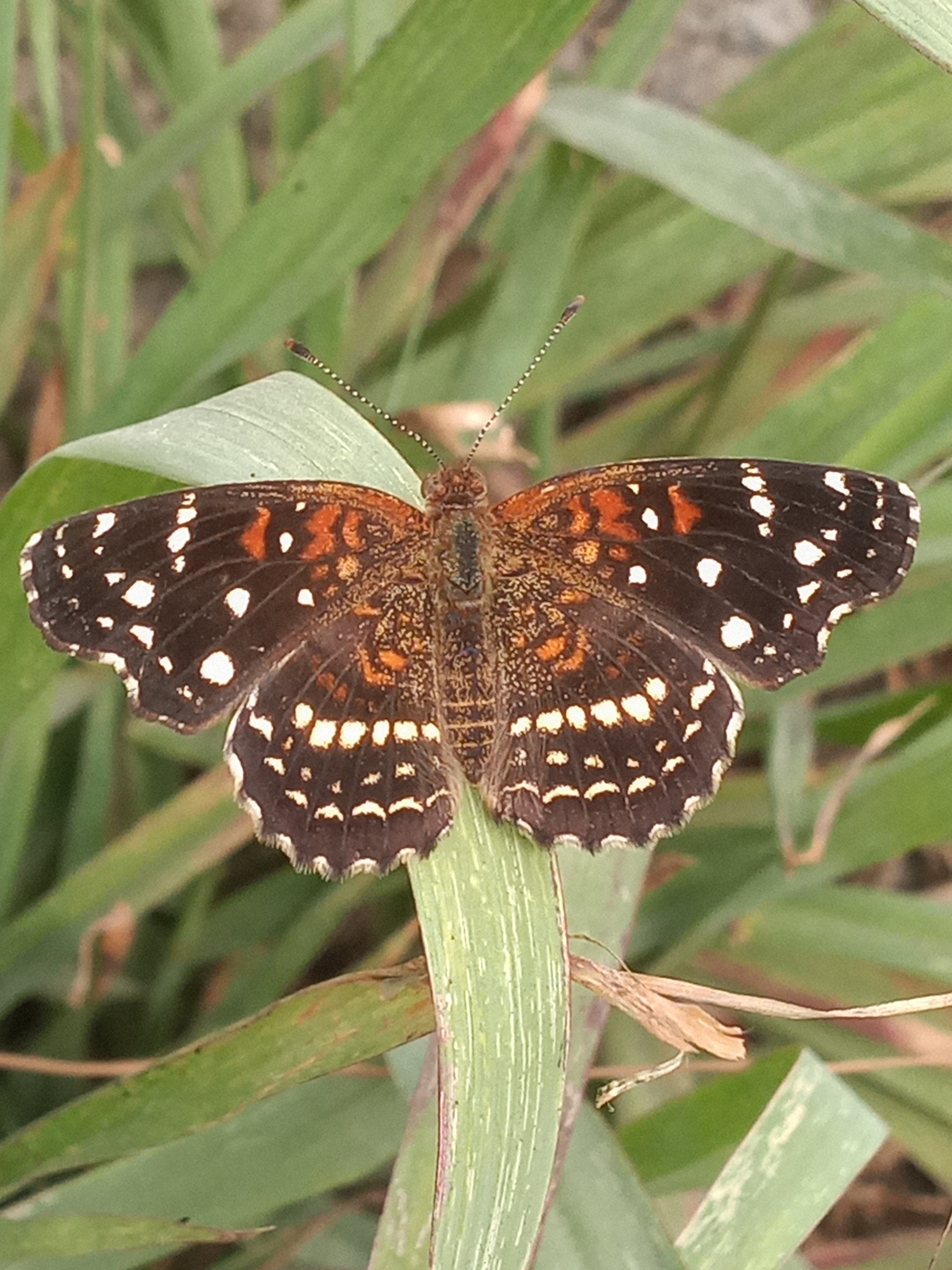
- Orange-patched crescent Anthanassa drusilla drusilla male, Panama Mariposa Lunita Tejana (Texan crescentspot butterfly) Anthanassa texana ssp. texana, Monterrey, Nuevo León, Mexico

Scientific classification
- Domain: Eukaryota
- Kingdom: Animalia
- Phylum: Arthropoda
- Class: Insecta
- Order: Lepidoptera
- Family: Nymphalidae
- Tribe: Melitaeini
- Genus: Anthanassa; Scudder, 1875

Synonyms
- Tritanassa Forbes, 1945; Phyciodes

= Anthanassa =

Genus of butterflies

Anthanassa is a genus of North and South American butterflies of the family Nymphalidae found from the United States to South America. One authority places this genus as a subgenus of Phyciodes.

== Species ==
Listed alphabetically:

- Anthanassa acesas (Hewitson, 1864)
- Anthanassa annulata Higgins, 1981
- Anthanassa ardys (Hewitson, 1864) – Ardys crescent, ardent crescent
- Anthanassa argentea (Godman & Salvin, [1882]) – chestnut crescent
- Anthanassa atronia (Bates, 1866) – brown crescent
- Anthanassa crithona (Salvin, 1871) – crithona crescent
- Anthanassa drusilla (C. & R. Felder, 1861) – orange-patched crescent
- Anthanassa dracaena (C. & R. Felder, [1867]) – notched crescent
- Anthanassa drymaea (Godman & Salvin, 1878) – weak-banded crescent
- Anthanassa frisia (Poey, 1832) – Cuban crescentspot, Cuban crescent
  - Anthanassa frisia tulcis (H.W. Bates, 1864) – pale-banded crescent
- Anthanassa nebulosa (Godman & Salvin, 1878) – blurry crescent
- Anthanassa otanes (Hewitson, 1864) – Otanes crescent, cloud-forest crescent, Blackened crescent
- Anthanassa ptolyca (Bates, 1864) – black crescent
- Anthanassa sitalces (Godman & Salvin, [1882]) – montane crescent, pine crescent
- Anthanassa sosis (Godman & Salvin, 1878)
- Anthanassa texana (Edwards, 1863) – Texan crescent
