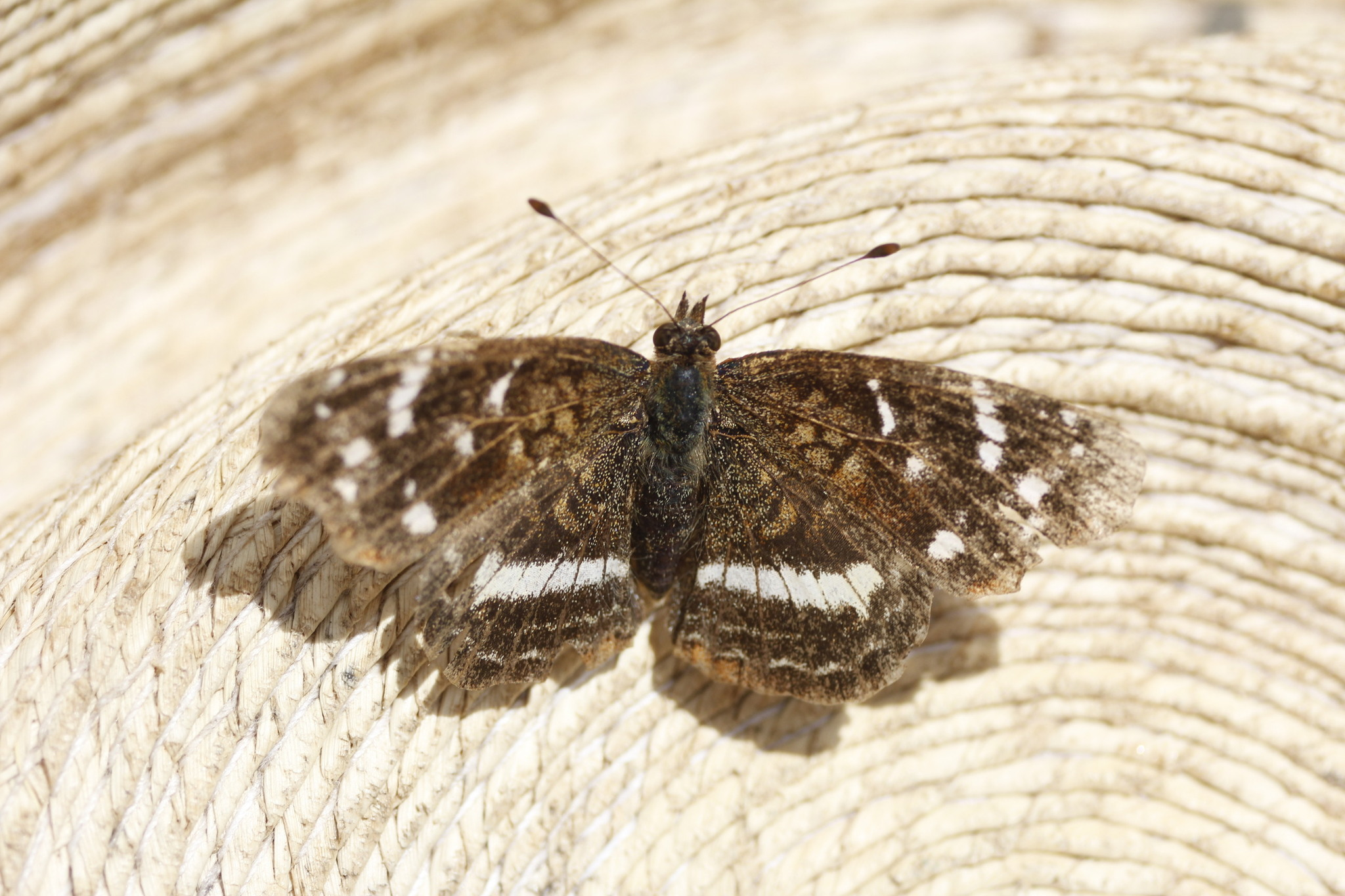

Scientific classification
- Kingdom: Animalia
- Phylum: Arthropoda
- Clade: Pancrustacea
- Class: Insecta
- Order: Lepidoptera
- Family: Nymphalidae
- Tribe: Melitaeini
- Genus: Anthanassa
- Species: A. argentea

Binomial name
- Anthanassa argentea (Godman & Salvin, 1882)

Synonyms
- Phyciodes argentea Godman and Salvin, 1882

= Anthanassa argentea =

Species of butterfly

Anthanassa argentea, the chestnut crescent, is a species of butterfly in the family Nymphalidae. It is found in North America.
