= William H. & William S. Edwards House =

Historic house in West Virginia, United States

- U.S. National Register of Historic Places
- Location within West Virginia Location within the United States
- Location: SR 61 NE of Cabin Creek, Coalburg, West Virginia
- Coordinates: 38°12′13″N 81°27′56″W
- Area: 8 acres (3.2 ha)
- Built: 1871
- Architectural style: Italianate
- NRHP reference No.: 90000713
- Added to NRHP: May 11, 1990

William H. & William S. Edwards House, also known as Bellefleur, is a historic home located at Coalburg, Kanawha County, West Virginia. The main house was built in 1871, and consists of a large 2 1/2-story main block with a rambling rear wing. It is a frame house that features Italianate style decorative detail. Also on the property are a contributing carriage house, wooden trellis, and the original cobblestone drive and entrance columns. It was the home of noted entomologist William Henry Edwards (1822–1909).

It was listed on the National Register of Historic Places in 1990.
