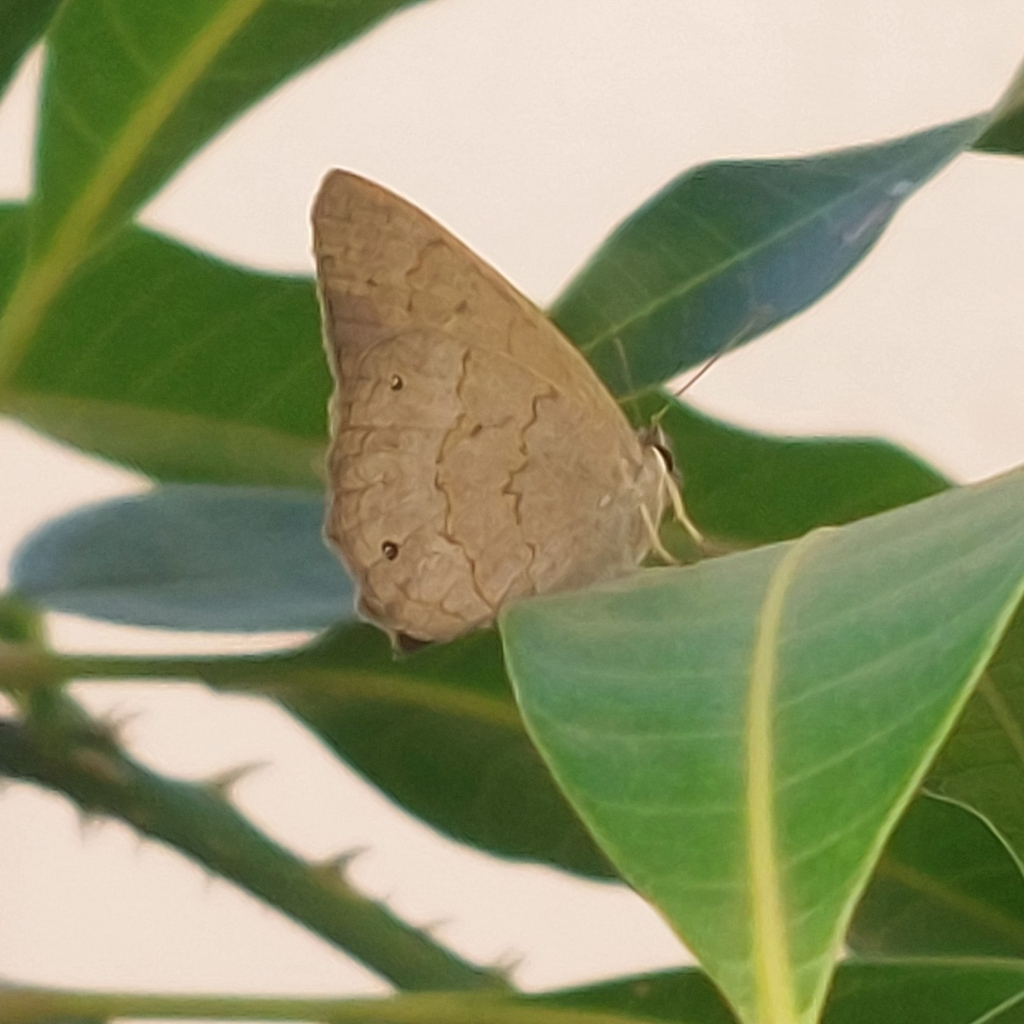

Scientific classification
- Kingdom: Animalia
- Phylum: Arthropoda
- Class: Insecta
- Order: Lepidoptera
- Family: Nymphalidae
- Genus: Cissia
- Species: C. eous

Binomial name
- Cissia eous (Butler, 1867)

Synonyms
- Paryphthimoides bahneri (Anken, 1994); Paryphthimoides kiliani (Anken, 1999)

= Cissia eous =

Species of butterfly

Cissia eous, locally known as the brown butterfly (Brazilian Portuguese: borboleta marrom), is a butterfly in the family Nymphalidae described by Arthur Gardiner Butler in 1867. It is found in the countries of Brazil, Argentina, Uruguay and Paraguay.

== Biology and phenology ==
In the moist and shady habitats of several vegetal formations, like secondary forests and coastal forest edges in Brazil, you'll frequently find adults of this species. They're attracted to fermented fruits and other decaying materials.

Larvae of this species can feed on Poa plants. Specifically in Poa annua, Digitaria sanguinalis and Stenotaphrum secundatum.
