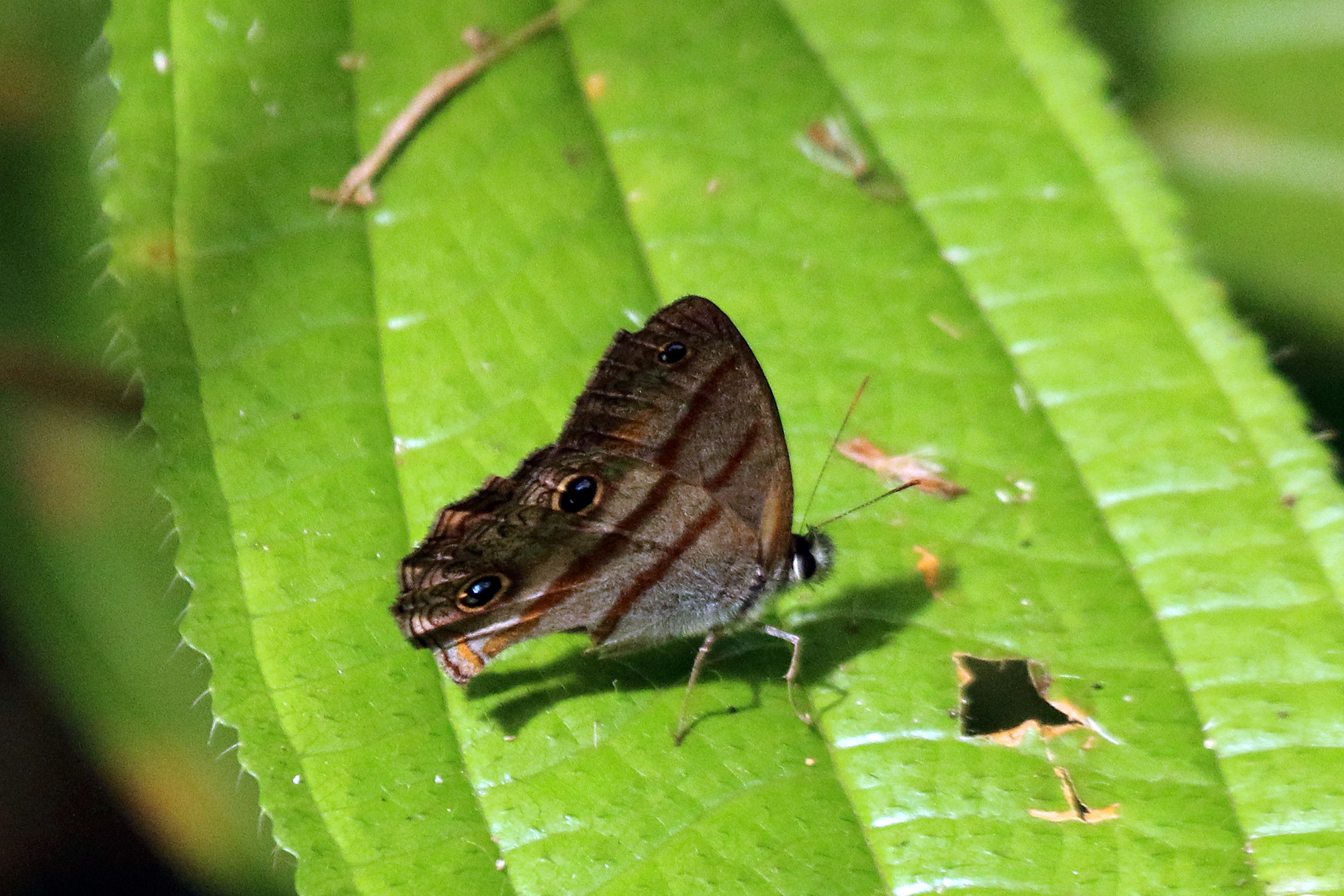
- Penelope's ringlet (C. penelope), Trinidad

Scientific classification
- Kingdom: Animalia
- Phylum: Arthropoda
- Class: Insecta
- Order: Lepidoptera
- Family: Nymphalidae
- Subfamily: Satyrinae
- Tribe: Satyrini
- Subtribe: Euptychiina
- Genus: Cissia; Doubleday, 1848

Synonyms
- Argyreuptychia Forster, 1964; Vareuptychia Forster, 1964

= Cissia =

Genus of butterflies

Cissia is a genus of satyrid butterfly found in the Neotropical realm.

== Species ==
Listed alphabetically:

- Cissia cleophes (Godman & Salvin, 1889) – Salvin's satyr
- Cissia eous (Butler, 1867) - brown satyr
- Cissia joyceae Singer, DeVries & Ehrlich, 1983
- Cissia penelope (Fabricius, 1775) – Penelope's ringlet
  - =Cissia moneta (Weymer, 1911) [syn.]
- Cissia pompilia (C. & R. Felder, [1867]) – plain satyr
- Cissia proba (Weymer, 1911) – Weymer's ringlet

Plus others later transferred into genus.

Below are those moved to other genera between 1998 and 2023:

- Cissia confusa (Staudinger, 1887) – confused satyr
- Cissia labe (Butler, 1870) – rusty-spotted satyr
- Cissia lesbia (Staudinger, [1886]) – Lesbia satyr
- Cissia myncea (Cramer, 1780) – Myneca satyr
- Cissia maripa Brévignon, 2005
- Cissia palladia (Butler, 1867) – Butler's satyr
- Cissia pseudoconfusa Singer, DeVries & Ehrlich, 1983 – gold-stained satyr
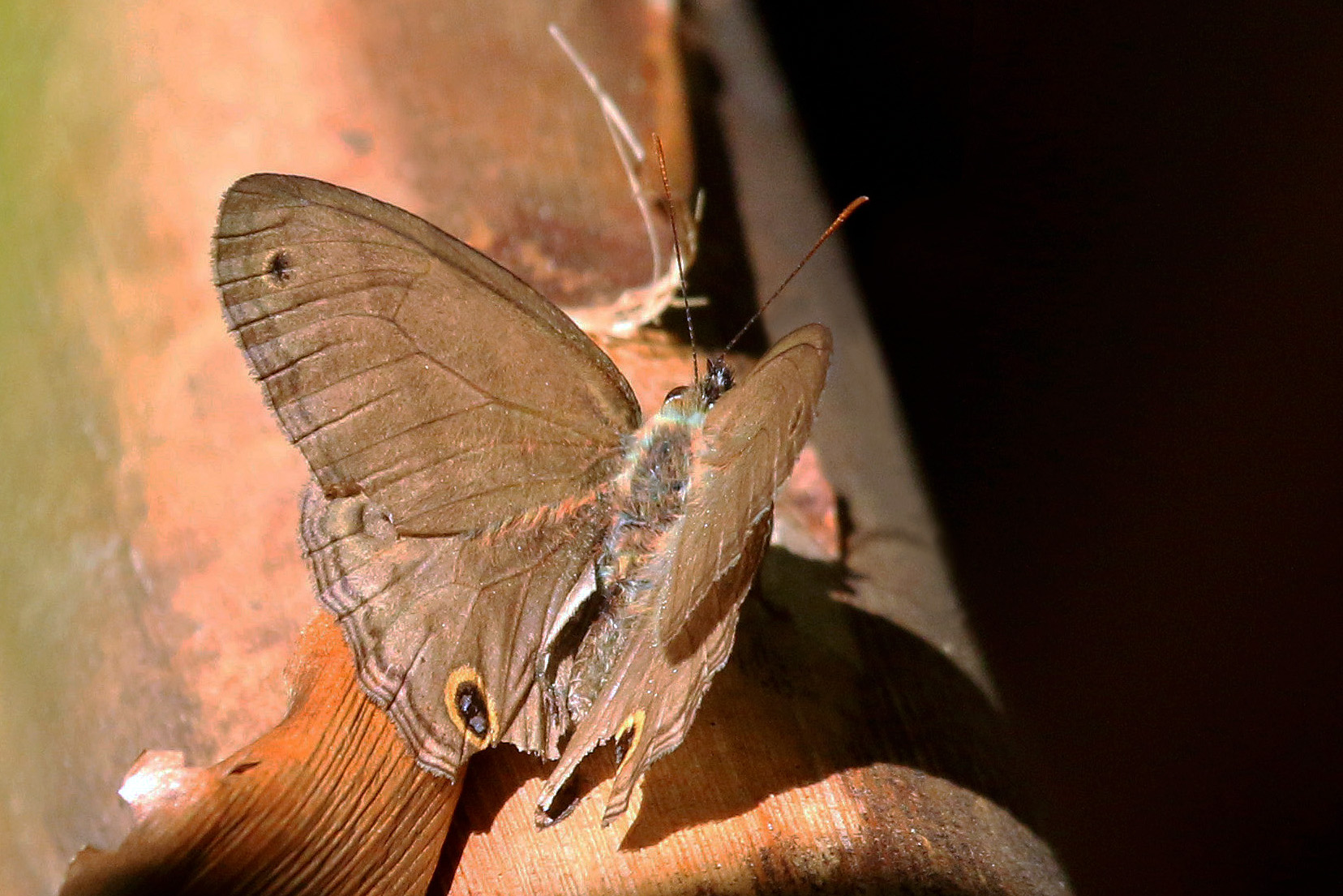
Butler's satyr (C. palladia), Trinidad
