= John William Weidemeyer =

American entomologist

John William Weidemeyer (b. in Fredericksburg, Virginia, 26 April 1819; d. in Amityville, New York, 18 January 1896) was a writer and entomologist.

== Biography ==
In Germany, his father had been an officer in the bodyguards of Jérôme Bonaparte, king of Westphalia. When John was still young, the family moved to New York City. Among his first teachers was Alexander T. Stewart, and he completed his education at the Columbia College grammar school. For several years he taught at various seminaries in Ohio, but subsequently settled in New York City, where he entered on a business career. He made collections of lepidoptera, including a western North American species that was named in his honor, Limenitis weidemeyerii (Weidemeyer's Admiral). His large collection was purchased by the museum in Ratisbon, Germany. In connection with the study of entomology, he published Catalogue of North-American Butterflies (Philadelphia, 1864).

== Writings ==
He contributed to the Christian Inquirer and the Atlantic Monthly, and prepared political articles for various journals. In 1841 he wrote a play entitled The Vagabonds, which was produced at the Franklin Theatre in New York City and the Arch Street Theatre in Philadelphia, and at one point he was preparing Cæsar and Cleopatra, an acting drama. Weidemeyer also published Real and Ideal: a Collection of Metrical Compositions by John W. Montclair (Philadelphia, 1865); Themes and Translations (New York, 1867); American Fish, and how to catch Them (1885); and From Alpha to Omega (1889).
