= Coalburg, West Virginia =

Unincorporated community in West Virginia, United States

- Unincorporated community
- Location within West Virginia Location within the United States
- Coordinates: 38°12′27″N 81°27′33″W
- Country: United States
- State: West Virginia
- County: Kanawha
- Elevation: 640 ft (200 m)
- Time zone: UTC-5 (Eastern (EST))
  - Summer (DST): UTC-4 (EDT)
- Area codes: 304 & 681
- GNIS feature ID: 1554162

Coalburg is an unincorporated community in Kanawha County, West Virginia, United States. Coalburg is located along the south bank of the Kanawha River, west of East Bank.

The William H. & William S. Edwards House and Good Shepherd Church were listed on the National Register of Historic Places in 1990.
