= William Henry Edwards =

American businessman and entomologist

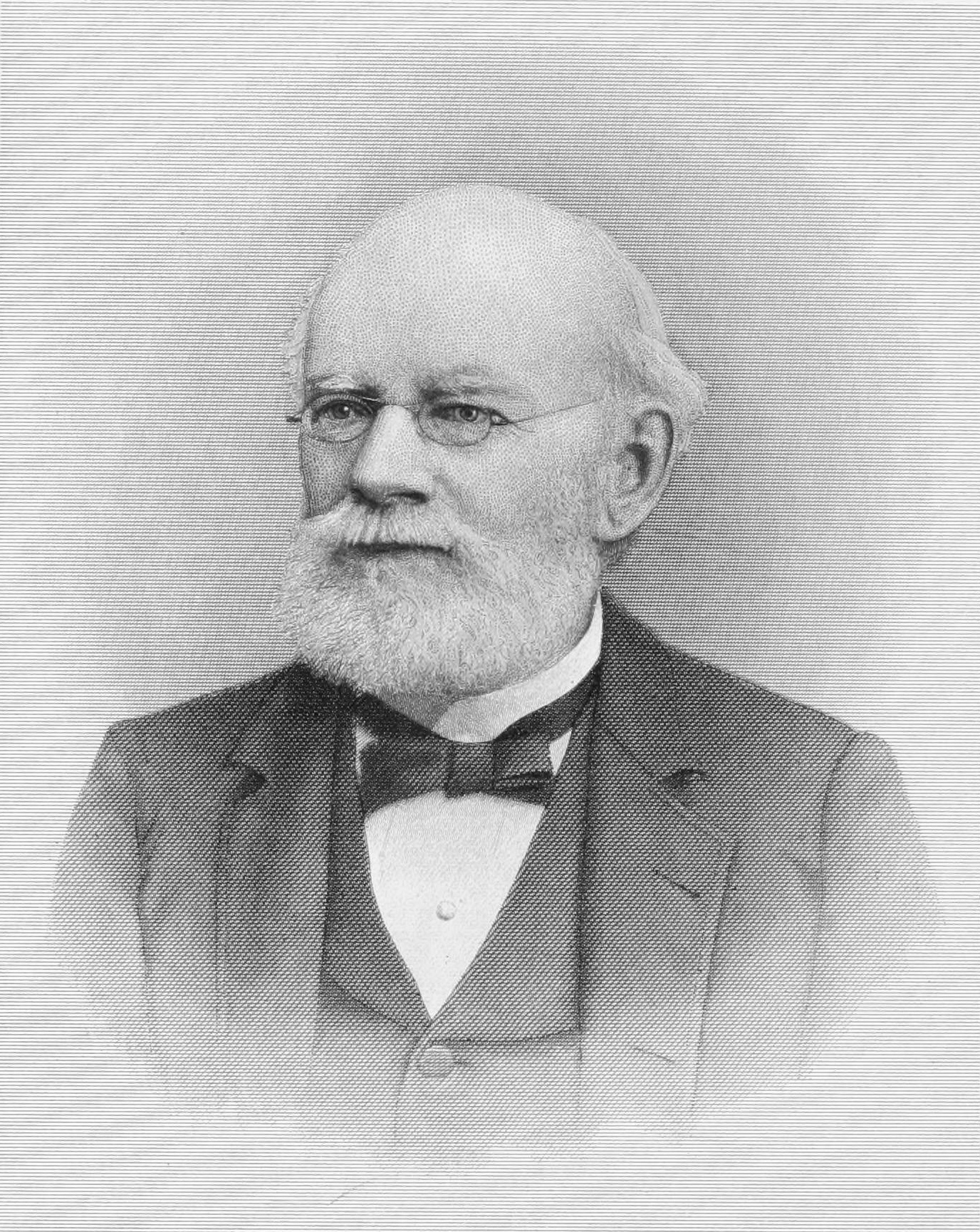
- Born: 15 March 1822; Hunter, New York, U.S.
- Died: 2 April 1909 (aged 87); Coalburg, West Virginia, U.S.
- Known for: A Voyage Up the River Amazon
- Spouse: Catherine Colt Tappan (m. 1851)
- Children: 3

William Henry Edwards (March 15, 1822 – April 2, 1909) was an American businessman and entomologist. He was an industrial pioneer in the coalfields of West Virginia, opening some of the earliest mines in the southern part of the state. He was also a prominent naturalist specializing in the study of butterflies. He wrote The Butterflies of North America, a three-volume treatise that is highly regarded for its scholarship and the quality of its illustrations.

== Biography ==
Edwards was born in Hunter, New York, a village that had been founded by his family just five years earlier and originally called Edwardsville. The son of William W. Edwards and Helen Ann (Mann) Edwards, he came from a prominent and successful American family. His father was a businessman involved in banking, insurance and European imports. His grandfather was Colonel William Edwards, founder of the family tannery business and inventor of several devices used in the manufacture of leather goods. His great-great-grandfather, Jonathan Edwards, was a distinguished theologian and revivalist preacher.

The Edwards family owned and managed a very large tannery in Hunter that relied on tanbark harvested from the hemlock forests of their country estate in the Catskill Mountains. Edwards grew up on the estate where he developed a lifelong appreciation of nature and an interest in natural history.

After attending the local village school in Hunter, Edwards went on to Williams College, Massachusetts in 1838. He disliked the strong religious tone at Williams, but greatly appreciated that the school was one of the first colleges in America to make natural history an important part of the curriculum. Edwards graduated in 1842 and then studied law in New York City with the expectation that he would join the family business. He was admitted to the New York bar in 1846, but did not pursue a career in law.

=== Amazon River ===
In 1846 Edwards traveled to Brazil and journeyed up the Amazon River with his uncle, Armory Edwards. Armory had been the US consul in Buenos Aires and worked in Argentina for the family's leather business. It is possible that the original purpose of their trip was related to family business concerns but for Edwards the focus of this trip became the beauty and untrammeled wilderness he experienced as they explored the huge delta island of Marajo and went upriver from Belém to Manaus.

Edwards took careful note of his experiences and shortly afterwards wrote a book, A Voyage Up the River Amazon, published in 1847. It is credited with sparking an interest in the region among natural scientists; in particular, Henry Walter Bates and Alfred Russel Wallace read Edward's account and were inspired to make the Amazon the destination for their famous expedition. Eventually, Edwards' book was just the first of several works written by naturalists that recorded the growing interest in the scientific exploration of the Amazon.

=== Coal business ===
Upon the death of his youngest brother in 1847, Edwards inherited 30,000 acres in Kanawha Valley, West Virginia (then still part of Virginia). His family had purchased the property sight-unseen from land speculators but Edwards soon determined that it was prime coal country, sitting atop some of the thickest coal seams in the world. He became one of the earliest entrants to the coal mining business in the region. In 1852 he opened the first coal mines on Paint Creek and developed the first cannel coal oil refinery in 1856. During the Civil War, Edwards organized the Kanawha and Ohio Coal Company and opened mines at Coalburg in 1863. Later, Edwards launched the mining industry's first coal towboat and used it to haul coal on the Ohio River to Cincinnati.

=== Butterflies ===
Although Edwards had been interested in natural history since his childhood, he only became a serious collector and student of butterflies around 1856 at the age of 33. He probably picked up the basics of entomology from John Weidemeyer, a New York entomologist who wrote one of the first American books on butterflies and John Akhurst, a New York taxidermist who also collected insects. During the 1850s Edwards built a significant collection of butterflies and corresponded with many prominent entomologists and other naturalists including Spencer Fullerton Baird. Baird, the first curator at the Smithsonian Institution, was supportive of Edward's new passion and sent him numerous butterfly specimens from the museum collections. Other museums followed suit and sent butterflies from around the world for identification.

Edwards published his first scientific paper in 1861 describing several new butterfly species. During the course of his career he published some 250 scientific papers on Lepidoptera. In addition to numerous papers describing new species of butterflies, he made important contributions in the area of polymorphism (the occurrence of more than one form in the same population of a species). Entomologists began to see polymorphism in insects as a demonstration of natural selection and an opportunity to study evolutionary processes. Edwards discovered many examples of polymorphism among butterflies in North America and showed that temperature was one environmental factor that influenced polymorphic species.

By 1865 Edwards had begun work on the Butterflies of North America, a three-volume masterpiece that has been called "one of the most important entomological publications of the 19th century." Originally intended to be a descriptive catalog of North American species, the scope grew to include detailed life histories of many species and some of the best butterfly illustrations ever published. The illustrations were drawn by Mary Peart, a talented Pennsylvanian artist, and hand-colored by Lydia Brown. Edwards spent the rest of his career completing what was to become his most important legacy. The third and final volume was published in 1897. Edwards retired from entomology shortly thereafter.

=== Personal life ===
Edward married Catherine Colt Tappan, the daughter of abolitionist Arthur Tappan, in 1851. They raised three children. Their son, William Seymour Edwards grew up to become prominent in West Virginia politics, industry and literature. Their daughter, Edith Edwards, married Theodore Luqueer Mead, a notable entomologist who had apprenticed for her father.

Edwards died at his home "Bellefleur" in Coalburg, West Virginia. The house was listed on the National Register of Historic Places in 1990.

== Works ==
Edwards published over 250 works including:

- A Voyage up the River Amazon (1847);
- The Butterflies of North America, volumes 1-3 (1868-1897);
- Synopsis of North American Butterflies (1872);
- "Catalogue of the Diurnal Lepidoptera of America North of Mexico";
- "Revised Catalogue of the Diurnal Lepidoptera of America North of Mexico" (1884);

After 1897 Edwards retired from his work in entomology. He wrote a genealogy of the Edwards family and published a monograph disputing the authorship of Shakespeare's plays:

- Memoirs of Col. William Edwards (1897)
- Shaksper not Shakespeare (1900)

== See also ==
- Category:Taxa named by William Henry Edwards
