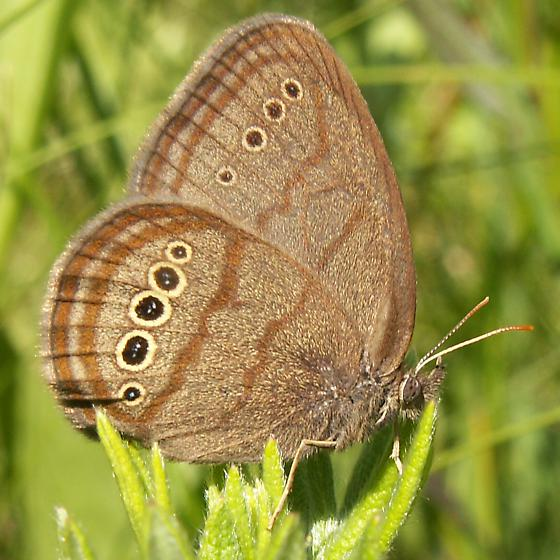

Conservation status
- Imperiled (NatureServe)

Scientific classification
- Kingdom: Animalia
- Phylum: Arthropoda
- Clade: Pancrustacea
- Class: Insecta
- Order: Lepidoptera
- Family: Nymphalidae
- Genus: Neonympha
- Species: N. mitchellii

Binomial name
- Neonympha mitchellii French, 1889

Subspecies
- N. m. mitchellii French, 1889; N. m. francisci Parshall & Kral, 1989

Synonyms
- Euptychia mitchellii; Cissia mitchellii

= Neonympha mitchellii =

Species of butterfly

Neonympha mitchellii is an endangered species of nymphalid butterfly of the eastern United States. There are two known subspecies:

- N. m. mitchellii, the nominate subspecies, commonly called Mitchell's satyr or Mitchell's marsh satyr, is found in Michigan and Indiana. The species is presumably extirpated from former ranges in Ohio (last seen in the 1950s), New Jersey (last seen in 1988), and Wisconsin.
- N. m. francisci, commonly called Saint Francis' satyr, is found in a single metapopulation in a 10 × 10 km area of Fort Bragg in North Carolina.

Recent discoveries since 1998 of populations in Alabama, Mississippi, and Virginia are being studied for taxonomic classification, and may be grouped with N. m. mitchellii or be described as new subspecies.

All subspecies, including those newly discovered, are federally protected under the Endangered Species Act.

Its larvae can feed upon the highly-invasive Japanese stilt grass Microstegium vimineum, so populations of this butterfly are potentially at risk from efforts to remove stilt grass. A butterfly of similar appearance, the Carolina satyr (Hermeuptychia sosybius), is also able to feed upon stilt grass.

== Description ==
Both subspecies are small brown butterflies with a wingspan range of 34–44 mm. The upper surfaces of their wings are unmarked, while the undersides of the wings have rows of round, yellow-ringed eyespots. N. m. francisci is slightly darker, with more irregularly shaped eyespots.

Their eggs are greenish white to cream, becoming tan as they age. The larvae's dark head can be seen a day or two before hatching. First instar larvae, 3–4 mm long, have dark brown bilobed heads, while four subsequent instars, 6–12 mm long, have green bilobed heads, and green bodies with raised white ridges along the sides.

The chrysalis is 10.5–15.5 mm long, suspended with the head down. It is a light lime green, with pale green or white speckling, and turns a medium brown about two days before eclosion.
