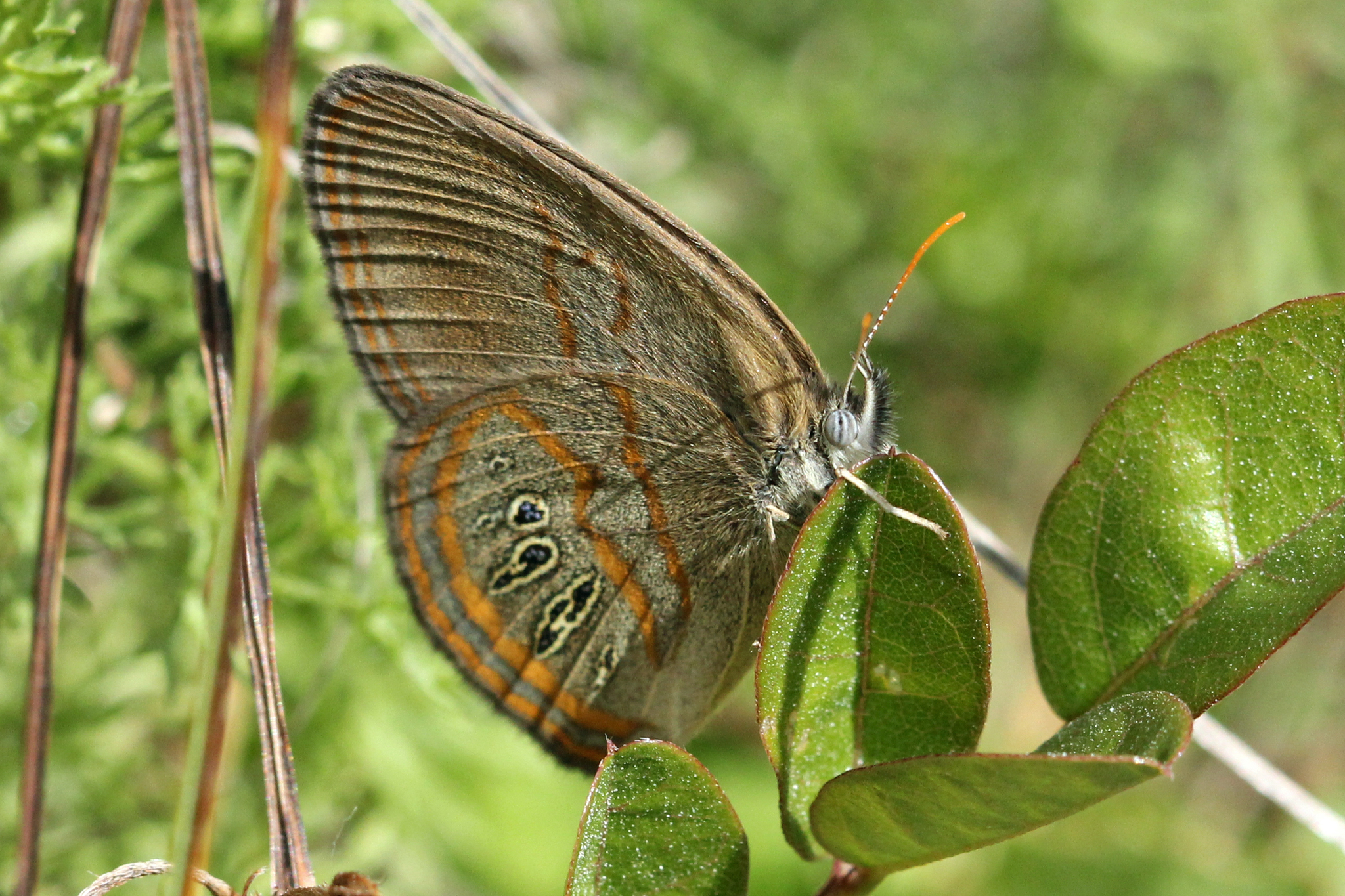

Conservation status
- Vulnerable (NatureServe)

Scientific classification
- Kingdom: Animalia
- Phylum: Arthropoda
- Clade: Pancrustacea
- Class: Insecta
- Order: Lepidoptera
- Family: Nymphalidae
- Genus: Neonympha
- Species: N. areolatus

Binomial name
- Neonympha areolatus (J. E. Smith, 1797)

= Neonympha areolatus =

Species of butterfly

Neonympha areolatus, the Georgia satyr, is a species of brush-footed butterfly in the family Nymphalidae. It is found in North America.
