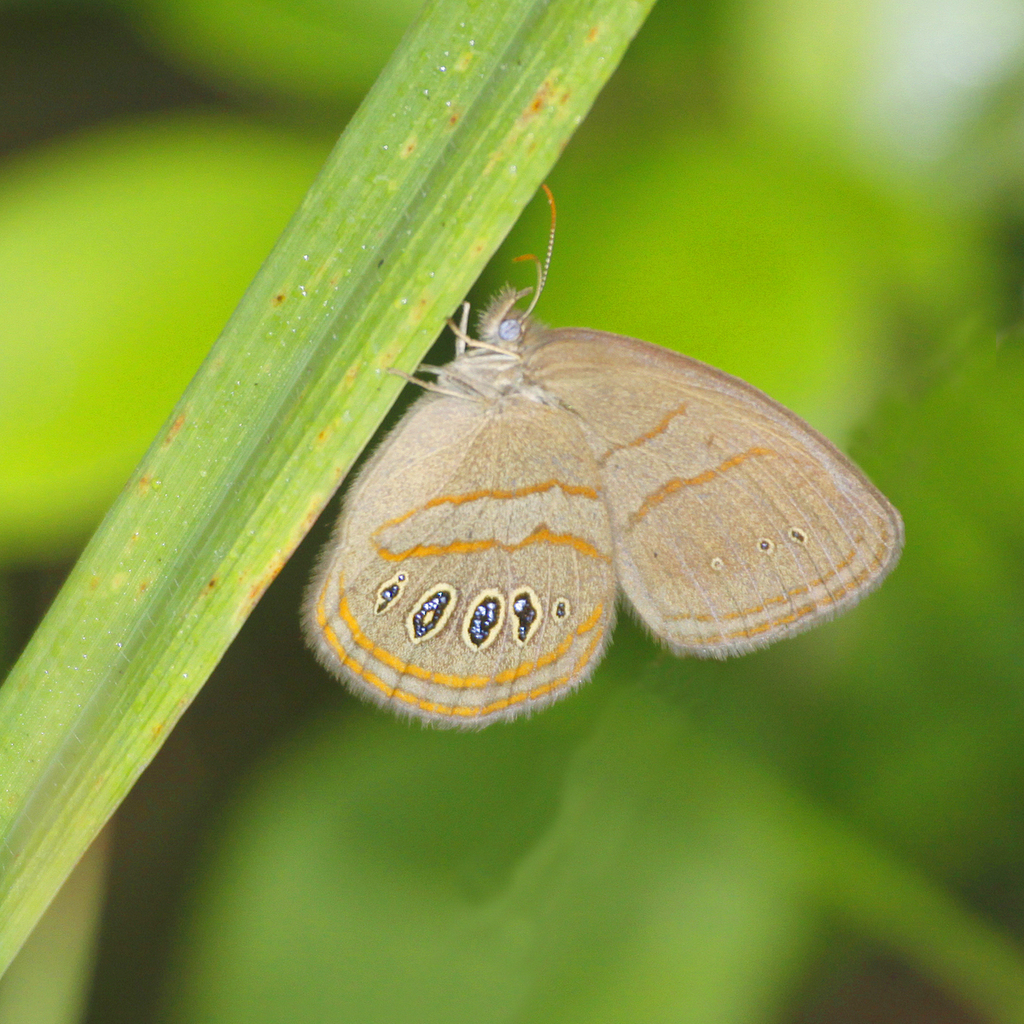

Scientific classification
- Kingdom: Animalia
- Phylum: Arthropoda
- Class: Insecta
- Order: Lepidoptera
- Family: Nymphalidae
- Genus: Neonympha
- Species: N. helicta

Binomial name
- Neonympha helicta (Hübner, 1808)

= Neonympha helicta =

Species of butterfly

Neonympha helicta, the helicta satyr, is a species of brush-footed butterfly in the family Nymphalidae. It is found in North America. There is some question that this putative species is the same as that figured by Jacob Hübner as Oreas helicta

The MONA or Hodges number for Neonympha helicta is 4576.1.

== Subspecies ==
These three subspecies belong to the species Neonympha helicta:

- Neonympha helicta dadeensis Gatrelle, 1999^{i g}
- Neonympha helicta helicta (Hübner, 1808)^{i g}
- Neonympha helicta septentrionalis W. Davis, 1924^{i g}

Data sources: i = ITIS, c = Catalogue of Life, g = GBIF, b = Bugguide.net
