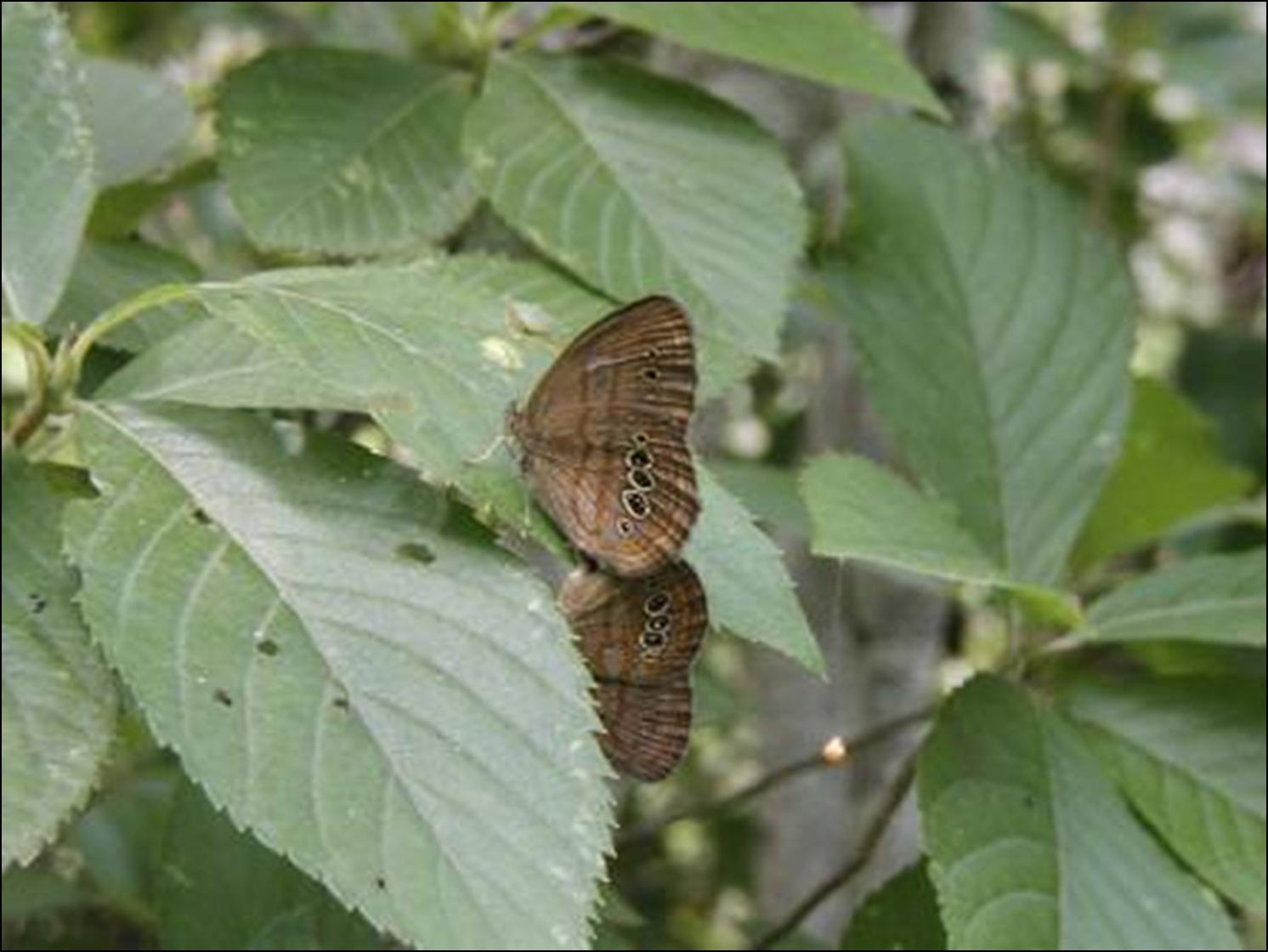
- Neonympha mitchellii francisci pair

Scientific classification
- Kingdom: Animalia
- Phylum: Arthropoda
- Class: Insecta
- Order: Lepidoptera
- Family: Nymphalidae
- Subfamily: Satyrinae
- Tribe: Satyrini
- Subtribe: Euptychiina
- Genus: Neonympha; Hübner, 1818

= Neonympha =

Genus of butterflies

Neonympha is a Nearctic and Neotropical genus of satyrid butterflies.

== Species ==
Listed alphabetically:

- Neonympha areolatus (Smith, 1797)
- Neonympha helicta (Hübner, [1808])
- Neonympha mitchellii French, 1889
- "Neonympha" lupita (Reakirt, [1867])

== Former species ==
Neonympha nerita (Capronnier, 1881) is a synonym of Paryphthimoides poltys.
