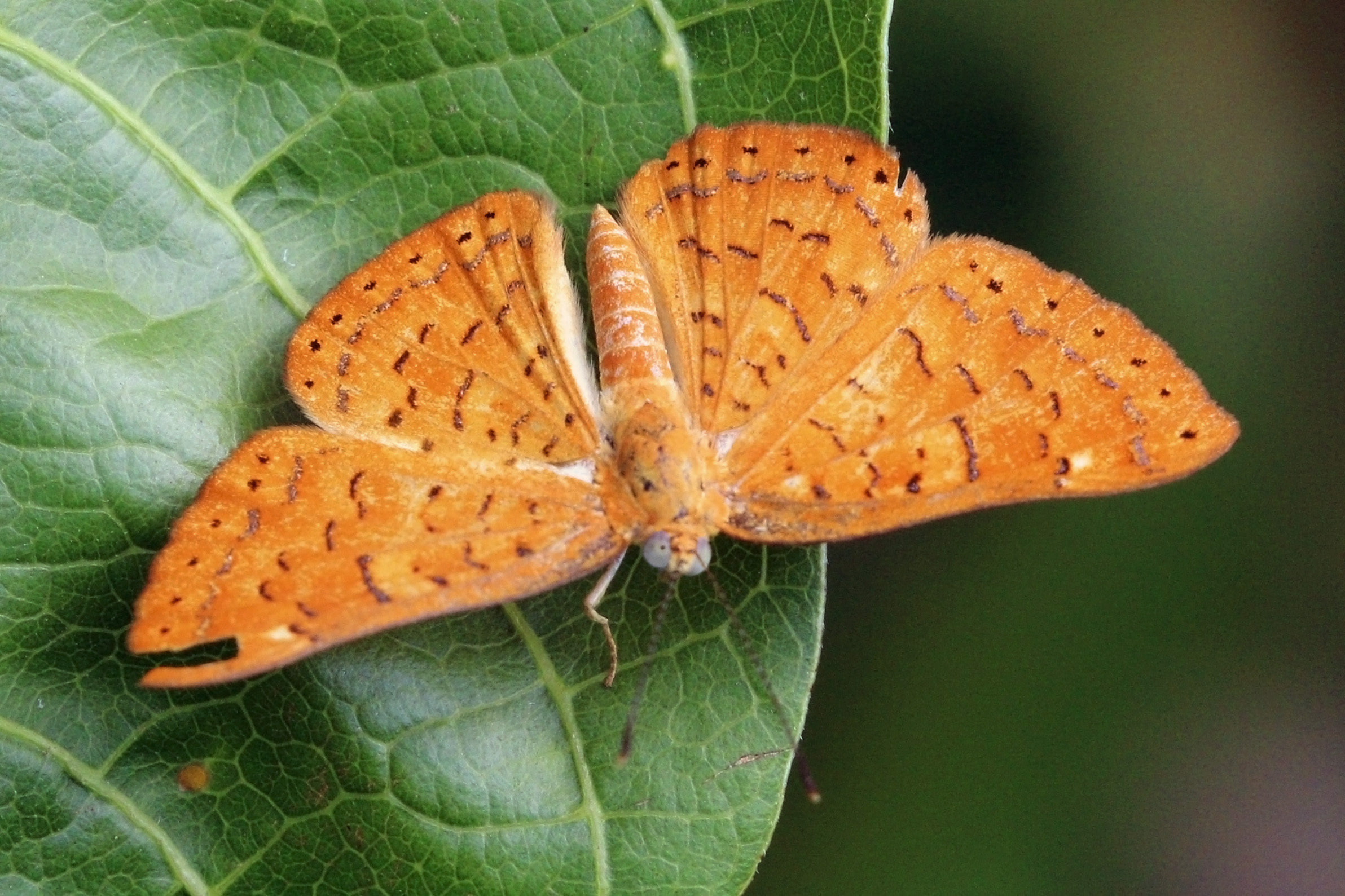
- E. cerea
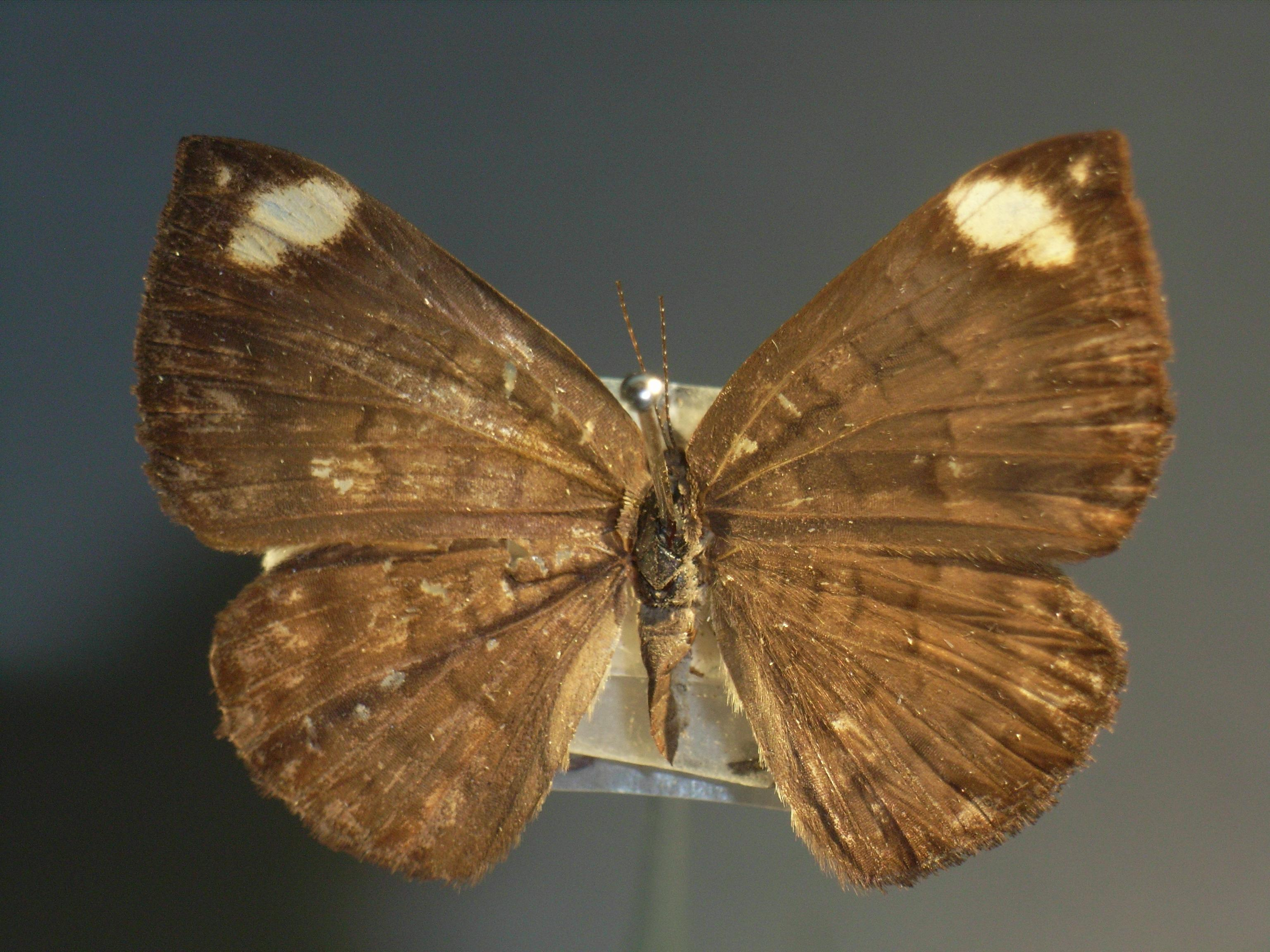
- Female E. lucinda

Scientific classification
- Domain: Eukaryota
- Kingdom: Animalia
- Phylum: Arthropoda
- Class: Insecta
- Order: Lepidoptera
- Family: Riodinidae
- Tribe: Emesiini
- Genus: Emesis; Fabricius, 1807

Species
- 41, see text

Synonyms
- Aphacitis Hübner, [1819]; Polystichtis Hübner, [1819]; Tapina Billberg, 1820; Nimula Blanchard, 1840; Polystichthis Agassiz, 1846; Nelone Boisduval, 1870

= Emesis (butterfly) =

Genus of butterflies

Emesis is a Neotropical genus of butterflies.

Species include:

- Emesis adelpha Le Cerf, 1958
- Emesis aerigera (Stichel, 1910)
- Emesis angularis Hewitson, 1870
- Emesis ares (Edwards, 1882)
- Emesis arnacis Stichel, 1928
- Emesis aurimna (Boisduval, 1870)
- Emesis brimo Godman & Salvin, 1889
- Emesis castigata Stichel, 1910
- Emesis cerea (Linnaeus, 1767)
- Emesis condigna Stichel, 1925
- Emesis cypria C. & R. Felder, 1861
- Emesis diogenia Prittwitz, 1865
- Emesis elegia Stichel, 1929
- Emesis emesia (Hewitson, 1867)
- Emesis eurydice Godman, 1903
- Emesis fatimella Westwood, 1851
- Emesis fastidiosa Ménétriés, 1855
- Emesis glaucescens Talbot, 1929
- Emesis guttata (Stichel, 1910)
- Emesis heterochroa Hopffer, 1874
- Emesis heteroclita Stichel, 1929
- Emesis lacrines Hewitson, 1870
- Emesis liodes Godman & Salvin, [1886]
- Emesis lucinda (Cramer, [1775])
- Emesis lupina Godman & Salvin, [1886]
- Emesis mandana (Cramer, [1780])
- Emesis neemias Hewitson, 1872
- Emesis ocypore (Geyer, 1837)
- Emesis orichalceus Stichel, 1916
- Emesis poeas Godman, [1901]
- Emesis russula Stichel, 1910
- Emesis sinuata Hewitson, 1877
- Emesis spreta Bates, 1868
- Emesis satema (Schaus, 1902)
- Emesis saturata Godman & Salvin, [1886]
- Emesis tegula Godman & Salvin, [1886]
- Emesis temesa (Hewitson, 1870)
- Emesis tenedia C. & R. Felder, 1861
- Emesis toltec Reakirt, 1866
- Emesis vimena Schaus, 1928
- Emesis vulpina Godman & Salvin, [1886]
- Emesis xanthosa (Stichel, 1910)
- Emesis zela Butler, 1870
