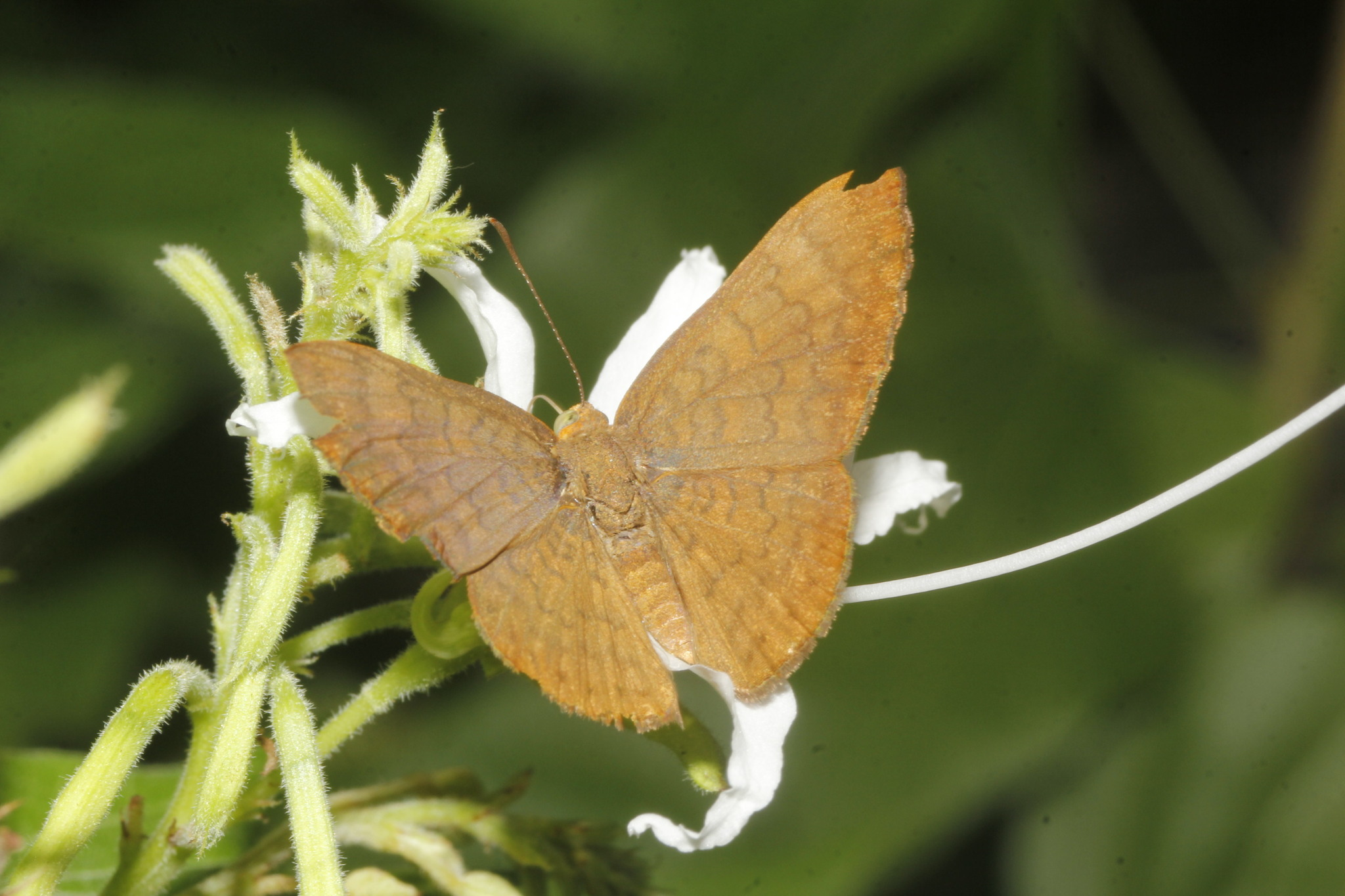

Scientific classification
- Kingdom: Animalia
- Phylum: Arthropoda
- Clade: Pancrustacea
- Class: Insecta
- Order: Lepidoptera
- Family: Riodinidae
- Tribe: Emesiini
- Genus: Emesis
- Species: E. tenedia

Binomial name
- Emesis tenedia C. Felder & R. Felder, 1861

= Emesis tenedia =

Species of butterfly

Emesis tenedia, the falcate metalmark, is a species of metalmark butterfly in the family Riodinidae. It is found in North America.

== Subspecies ==
These three subspecies belong to the species Emesis tenedia:

- Emesis tenedia melancholica Stichel, 1916
- Emesis tenedia ravidula Stichel, 1910
- Emesis tenedia tenedia
