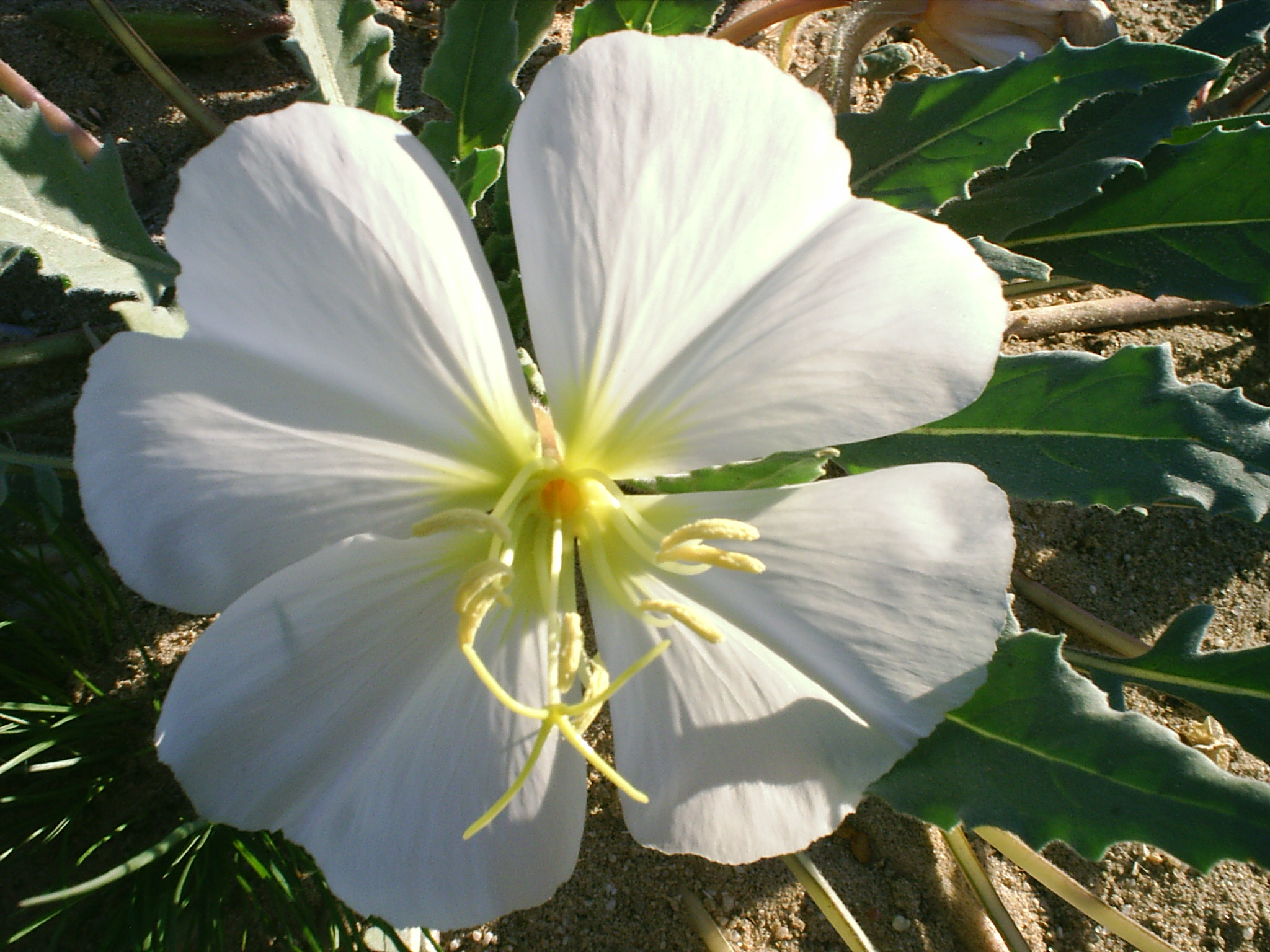

Conservation status
- Secure (NatureServe)

Scientific classification
- Kingdom: Plantae
- Clade: Tracheophytes
- Clade: Angiosperms
- Clade: Eudicots
- Clade: Rosids
- Order: Myrtales
- Family: Onagraceae
- Genus: Oenothera
- Species: O. deltoides

Binomial name
- Oenothera deltoides Torr. & Frém.

Subspecies
- O. d. subsp. ambigua; O. d. subsp. cognata; O. d. subsp. deltoides; O. d. subsp. howellii; O. d. subsp. julpunensis; O. d. subsp. piperi

= Oenothera deltoides =

Plant species in the evening primrose family

Oenothera deltoides is a species of evening primrose known by several common names, including birdcage evening primrose, basket evening primrose, lion in a cage, and devil's lantern. It is native to the Southwestern United States and northern Mexico, where it grows in sandy habitats from desert to beach.

The plant is grayish with basal, deltoid leaves. The large white flowers turn pinkish as they mature. When the plants die, the stems curl upward and form the "birdcage" for which the common name is derived.

== Taxonomy ==
Oenothera deltoides was scientifically describe and named by John Torrey and John C. Frémont in 1845. It is part of the genus Oenothera in the family Onagraceae.

According to Plants of the World Online (POWO) it has six subspecies. One of these, the Antioch Dunes Evening Primrose (ssp. howellii), is a federally listed endangered species known from a few sandy spots in the Antioch Dunes National Wildlife Refuge just inland from the San Francisco Bay Area in California.

Oenothera caespitosa is very similar, but lacks stems and has slightly larger flowers.

Oenothera deltoides has 17 synonyms of the species or one of its subspecies according to POWO.

Table of Synonyms
Name	Year	Rank	Synonym of:	Notes
Anogra deltoidea (Torr. & Frém.) Small	1896	species	O. deltoides	≡ hom.
Anogra simplex Small	1896	species	subsp. ambigua	≡ hom.
Oenothera albicaulis var. decumbens S.Watson	1875	variety	subsp. ambigua	= het.
Oenothera ambigua S.Watson	1879	species	subsp. ambigua	≡ hom., nom. illeg.
Oenothera deltoides var. ambigua Munz	1931	variety	subsp. ambigua	≡ hom.
Oenothera deltoides var. cineracea (Jeps.) Munz	1931	variety	subsp. deltoides	= het.
Oenothera deltoides var. cognata (Jeps.) Munz	1931	variety	subsp. cognata	≡ hom.
Oenothera deltoides var. decumbens (S.Watson) Munz	1932	variety	subsp. ambigua	= het.
Oenothera deltoides f. floccosa Munz	1931	form	subsp. deltoides	= het.
Oenothera deltoides f. glabrata Munz	1931	form	subsp. deltoides	= het.
Oenothera deltoides var. howellii Munz	1949	variety	subsp. howellii	≡ hom.
Oenothera deltoides var. piperi Munz	1931	variety	subsp. piperi	≡ hom.
Oenothera deltoides var. typica Munz	1931	variety	O. deltoides	≡ hom., not validly publ.
Oenothera kleinii W.L.Wagner & S.W.Mill	1984	species	subsp. deltoides	= het.
Oenothera simplex (Small) Tidestr.	1935	species	subsp. ambigua	≡ hom., nom. illeg.
Oenothera trichocalyx var. cineracea Jeps.	1925	variety	subsp. deltoides	= het.
Oenothera trichocalyx var. cognata Jeps.	1925	variety	subsp. cognata	≡ hom.
Notes: ≡ homotypic synonym; = heterotypic synonym
