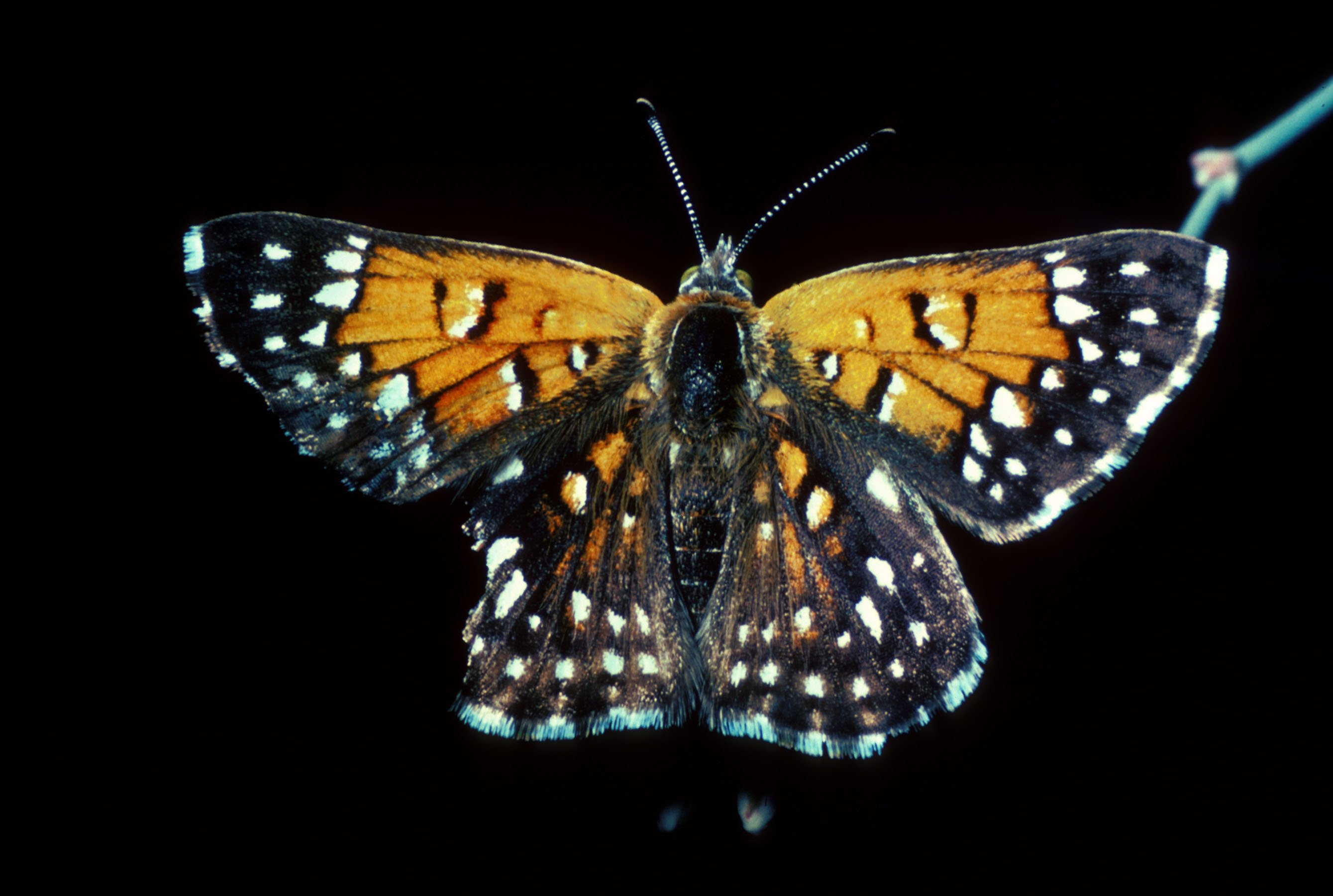

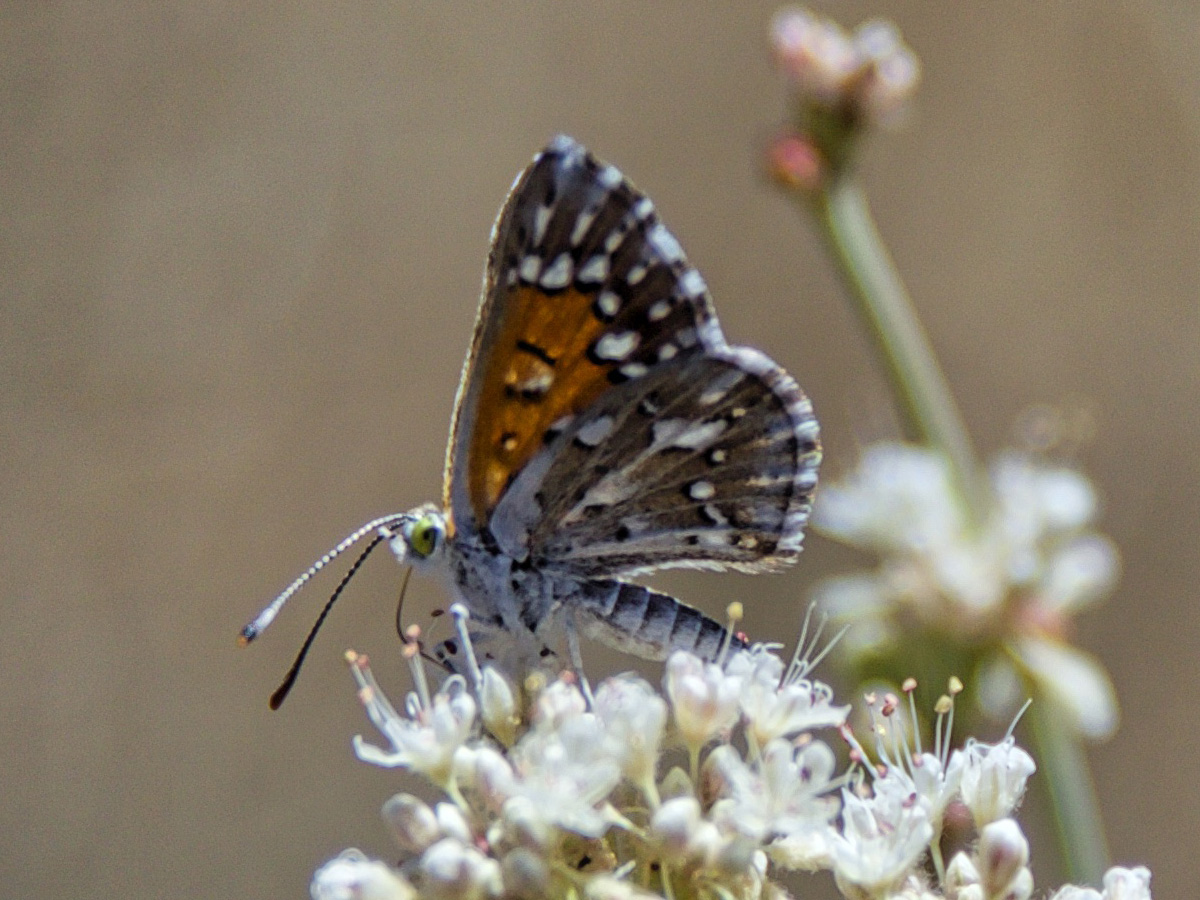

Conservation status
- Endangered (ESA)

Scientific classification
- Kingdom: Animalia
- Phylum: Arthropoda
- Clade: Pancrustacea
- Class: Insecta
- Order: Lepidoptera
- Family: Riodinidae
- Genus: Apodemia
- Species: A. mormo
- Subspecies: A. m. langei

Trinomial name
- Apodemia mormo langei Comstock, 1938

= Apodemia mormo langei =

Lange's metalmark butterfly

Subspecies of butterfly

Apodemia mormo langei, the Lange's metalmark butterfly, is an endangered North American butterfly. It is a subspecies of the Mormon metalmark and belongs to the family Riodinidae. The butterfly is endemic to California, where it is known from one strip of riverbank in the San Francisco Bay Area. A 2008 count estimated the total remaining population at 131 individuals.

== Description ==
Lange's metalmark is a fragile, brightly colored butterfly in the Riodinidae (metalmark) family. Adult wingspan varies from 1-inch (25 mm) to 1.5-inch (38 mm). Dorsal wings are largely black with white spots. Red-orange coloration extends through the inner forward half of the forewing, the hindwing bases, and a small central patch subtended by black. Below, the wings have a more muted pattern of gray, white, black, and orange.

== Status and distribution ==
The butterfly has been classified in the United States as a federal endangered species (Federal Register 41:22044; June 1, 1976).

Lange's metalmark butterfly was historically restricted to sand dunes along the southern bank of the Sacramento River, and is currently found only at Antioch Sand Dunes (a misnomer, as the sand was long ago removed and the landscape is now hilly scrub) in Contra Costa County, California. Most of the habitat is now part of the Antioch Dunes National Wildlife Refuge, administered by the Don Edwards San Francisco Bay National Wildlife Refuge Complex. While the Antioch Dunes Recovery Plan of April 25, 1984, has been put under action, no critical habitat has been designated as yet.

In the early 1900s, the isolated dune habitat in the Sacramento-San Joaquin River Delta began to experience a dramatic change as human development expanded. The easily accessible sand was harvested to make bricks. Large-scale sand mining and industrial development fragmented the sand dune habitat until only a small portion of the original ecosystem remained. Nonnative grasses and other vegetation encroached on the sand dunes to crowd the few remaining endangered plants. By the time the Antioch Dunes Refuge was established, only a few acres of remnant dune habitat supported the last natural populations of Antioch Dunes evening primrose (Oenothera deltoides ssp. howellii), Contra Costa wallflower (Erysimum capitatum var. angustatum) and Lange's metalmark.

In addition to the challenges posed by habitat loss, the Apodemia mormo langei was at risk from fugitive dust from industrial sites, such as the gypsum dust close to the Antioch Dunes National Wildlife Refugee. Gypsum dust built up on the butterfly's food plants, harming its larvae, which were already vulnerable due to the deficient population levels of the species. Conservationists raised concerns over the possible effects of the dust and pointed out that research near the Antioch Dunes indicated that exposure to gypsum dust shortened the lifespan of Apodemia mormo langei adults.

In a 2013 study, gypsum dust was officially acknowledged as a potential environmental stressor for the butterfly. According to preliminary research, the Apodemia mormo langei exposed to dust lived a three-day shorter lifespan than those that weren't. However, researchers have had trouble conducting experimental tests due to the species' small population. These difficulties hinder the evaluation of how dust exposure affects various life stages, particularly how it can influence how larvae eat contaminated plants.

A reservoir of moving sand is essential to maintain the dynamic ecology of the dunes, as moving sand opens areas for the establishment of seedling plants. Roto-tilling has contributed to the invasion of exotic vegetation that stabilizes the remaining sand-dune habitat and competes with native dune vegetation. Habitat improvement activities have included dune restoration, hand clearing of nonnative plant species, planting buckwheat seedlings and restriction of public access to avoid trampling and fire.

A nonprofit environmental group has been breeding the butterflies in captivity since 2007 and periodically releasing larvae and adults back to the wild as insurance against collapse of the remaining wild population.

Recent genetic research has offered new insights into the evolutionary distinctiveness of Apodemia mormo langei. Although the subspecies are geographically isolated at the Antioch Dunes, genetic studies suggest it shares significant similarities with other populations within the Apodemia mormo species complex across California. This genetic overlap has led conservationists to question previous assumptions about the subspecies' uniqueness. Traits once believed to be exclusive to Apodemia mormo langei have been observed in other populations, prompting ongoing discussions regarding its classification as an Evolutionarily Significant Unit (ESU).

As a result of these genetic research findings, there is an ongoing debate among conservationists about the optimal management strategy for the species. The issue remains unsolved as some conservationists argue that conservation efforts should remain focused on the Apodemia mormo langei alone while others believe that they should be extended to other related populations in the Apodemia mormo complex.

== Life history ==
All the life stages of Lange's metalmark butterflies are found close to the larval food plant, buckwheat (Eriogonum nudum ssp. psychicola). The eggs are deposited on buckwheat leaves near the leaf petiole during a short mating flight of 10 days' duration. Larvae hatch during the rainy months. Larvae are known to feed only on buckwheat. The adults may use buckwheat, butterweed (Senecio douglasii) for nectar. Lange's metalmark butterfly also uses silver lupine (Lupinus albifrons) for mating.

Unlike the many butterfly species that have several generations a year, Lange's metalmark has only one. The fecundity of wild individuals is low. Detailed life history and physiological requirements of this subspecies are unknown.
