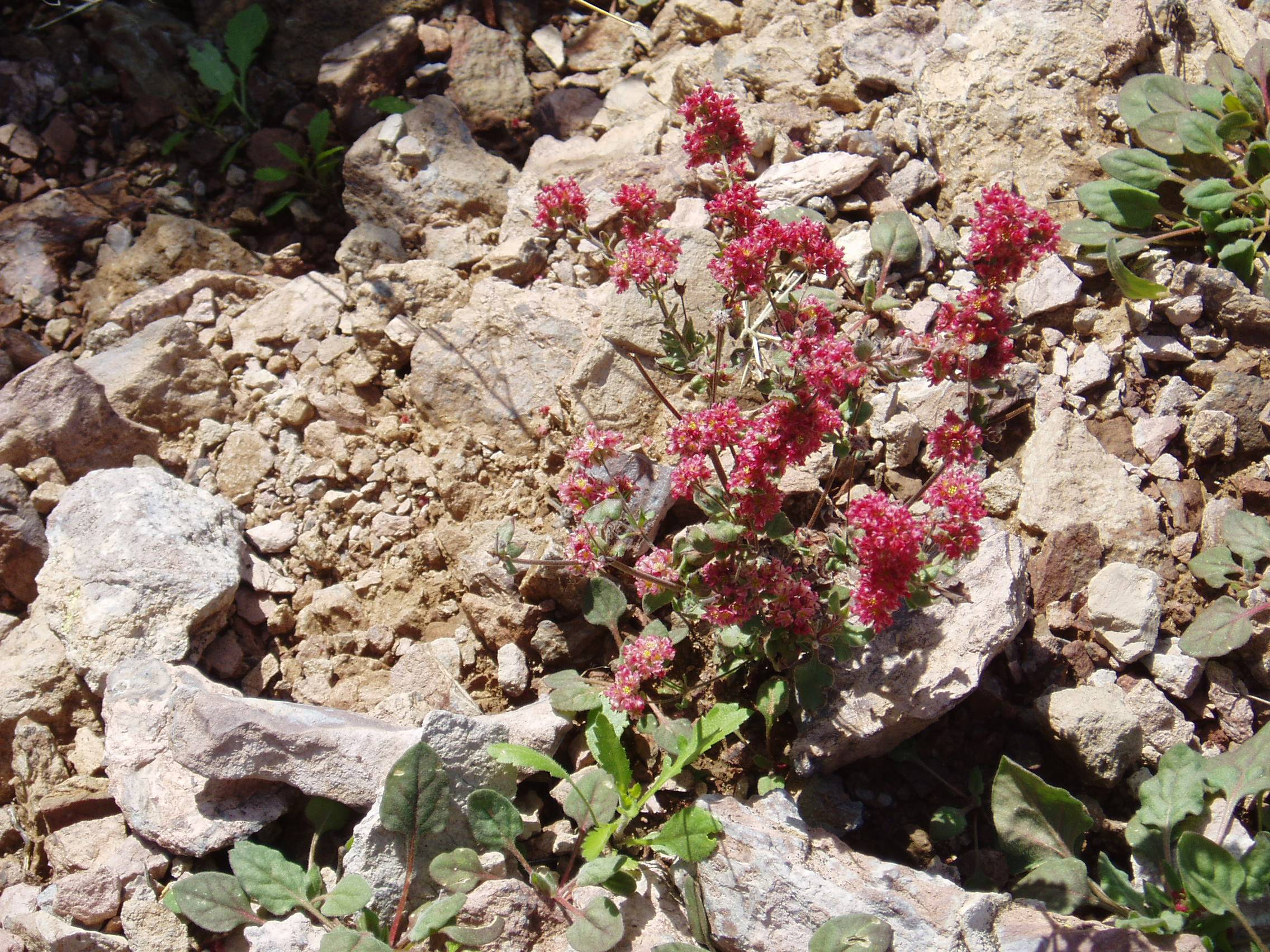
- In Sonoran Desert habitat, within Organ Pipe Cactus National Monument, Arizona.

Conservation status
- Secure (NatureServe)

Scientific classification
- Kingdom: Plantae
- Clade: Embryophytes
- Clade: Tracheophytes
- Clade: Angiosperms
- Clade: Eudicots
- Order: Caryophyllales
- Family: Polygonaceae
- Genus: Eriogonum
- Species: E. abertianum

Binomial name
- Eriogonum abertianum Torr.

= Eriogonum abertianum =

Abert's buckwheat

Species of wild buckwheat

Eriogonum abertianum, with the common names Abert's buckwheat and Abert wild buckwheat, is a species of flowering plant in the family Polygonaceae.

== Distribution ==
This annual herb is native to: Northern Mexico in Coahuila, Chihuahua, Sonora, and San Luis Potosí states; and the Southwestern United States within Arizona, New Mexico, and Texas.

It grows from 400–2,500 metres (1,300–8,200 ft) in elevation. Habitats it is found in include the Chihuahuan Desert and Sonoran Desert.

== Description ==
Eriogonum abertianum grows from 1–3 feet (0.30–0.91 m) in height and width.

Its leaves are tomentose, and greenish, tawny, or reddish on both surfaces (1-4 × 1-3 cm).

The 3–4.5 mm flowers are white, pink, or yellow. It bloom period is year round.

== Taxonomy ==
Eriogonum abertianum was named in 1843 by John Torrey, placing it in the Eriogonum genus. It is part of the Polygonaceae family and has two accepted varieties.

- Eriogonum abertianum var. abertianum – Native to Arizona to Texas and Baja California, Chihuahua, Coahuila, San Luis Potosí, and Sonora
- Eriogonum abertianum var. cyclosepalum – Endemic to New Mexico

Eriogonum abertianum has 13 synonyms of the species or one of its two varieties.

Table of Synonyms
Name	Year	Rank	Synonym of:	Notes
Eriogonum abertianum var. bracteatum Fosberg	1938	variety	var. abertianum	= het.
Eriogonum abertianum var. gillespiei Fosberg	1938	variety	var. abertianum	= het.
Eriogonum abertianum subsp. lappulaceum (Greene) S.Stokes	1936	subspecies	var. abertianum	= het.
Eriogonum abertianum var. lappulaceum (Greene) Fosberg	1938	variety	var. abertianum	= het.
Eriogonum abertianum var. neomexicanum Gand.	1906	variety	var. abertianum	= het.
Eriogonum abertianum subsp. pinetorum (Greene) S.Stokes	1936	subspecies	var. abertianum	= het.
Eriogonum abertianum var. ruberrimum Gand.	1906	variety	var. abertianum	= het.
Eriogonum abertianum subsp. typicum S.Stokes	1936	subspecies	E. abertianum	≡ hom., not validly publ.
Eriogonum abertianum var. villosum Fosberg	1938	variety	var. abertianum	= het.
Eriogonum cyclosepalum Greene	1910	species	var. cyclosepalum	≡ hom.
Eriogonum cyclosepalum var. gillespiei (Fosberg) I.M.Johnst.	1944	variety	var. abertianum	= het.
Eriogonum lappulaceum Greene	1910	species	var. abertianum	= het.
Eriogonum pinetorum Greene	1910	species	var. abertianum	= het.
Notes: ≡ homotypic synonym; = heterotypic synonym

=== Pollinator plant ===
This species is a food source for adult Crescent Metalmark butterflies (Apodemia phyciodoides). It is also of special value to native bees.
