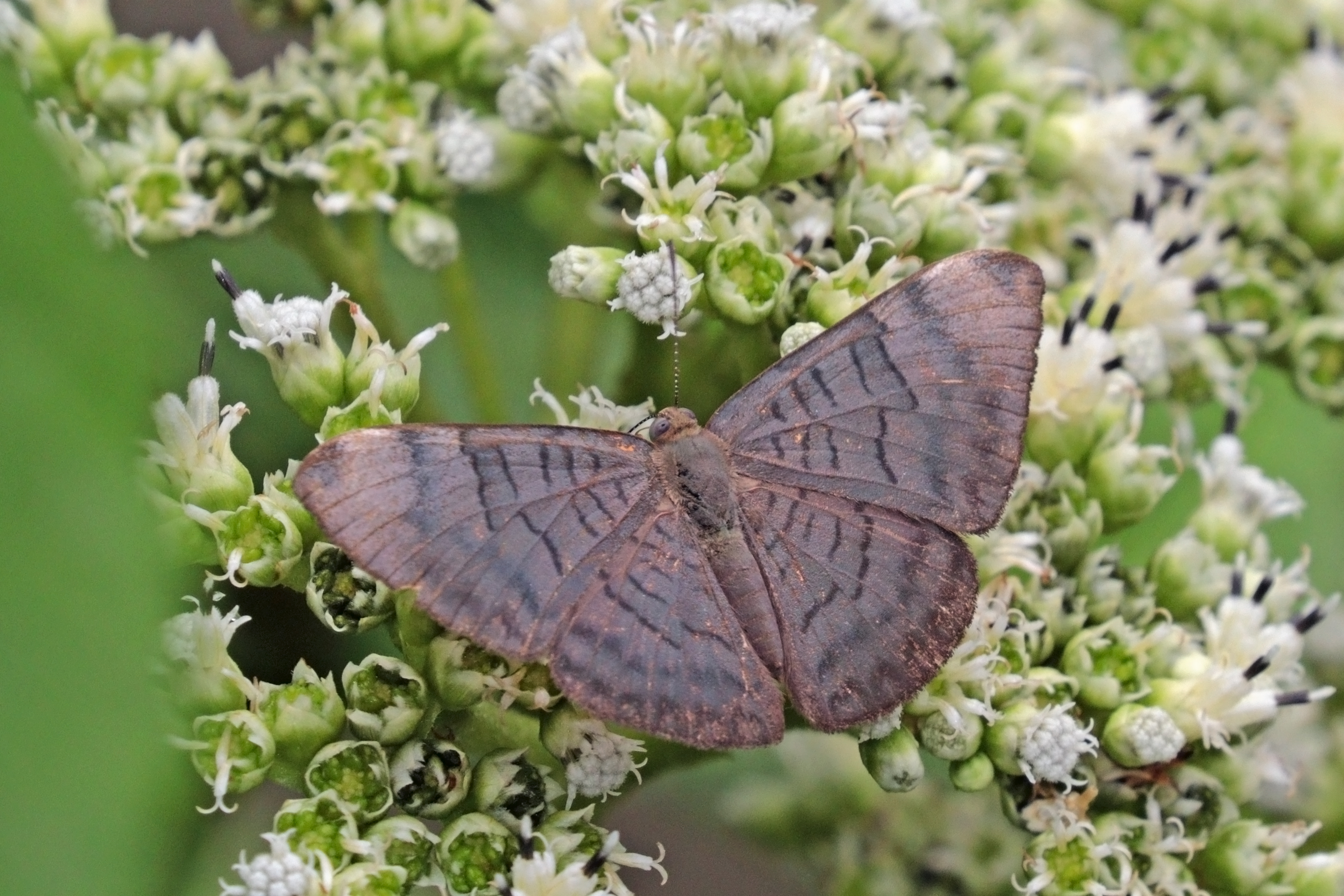
- male, Panama

Scientific classification
- Domain: Eukaryota
- Kingdom: Animalia
- Phylum: Arthropoda
- Class: Insecta
- Order: Lepidoptera
- Family: Riodinidae
- Tribe: Emesiini
- Genus: Emesis
- Species: E. lucinda

Binomial name
- Emesis lucinda (Cramer, [1775])

Synonyms
- Papilio lucinda Cramer, [1775]; Papilio dyndima Cramer, [1780]; Papilio lassus Fabricius, 1787; Emesis lucinda opaca Stichel, 1910

= Emesis lucinda =

White-patched emesis

Species of butterfly

Emesis lucinda (white-patched emesis or lucinda metalmark) is a butterfly of the family Riodinidae. It is found from Mexico to Bolivia and in Suriname, French Guiana and Brazil.

The wingspan is about 36 mm.

== Subspecies ==
Emesis aurimna, Emesis eurydice, Emesis castigata, Emesis fastidiosa, Emesis glaucescens, Emesis liodes and Emesis spreta were all treated as subspecies of Emesis lucinda, but are now considered full species.
