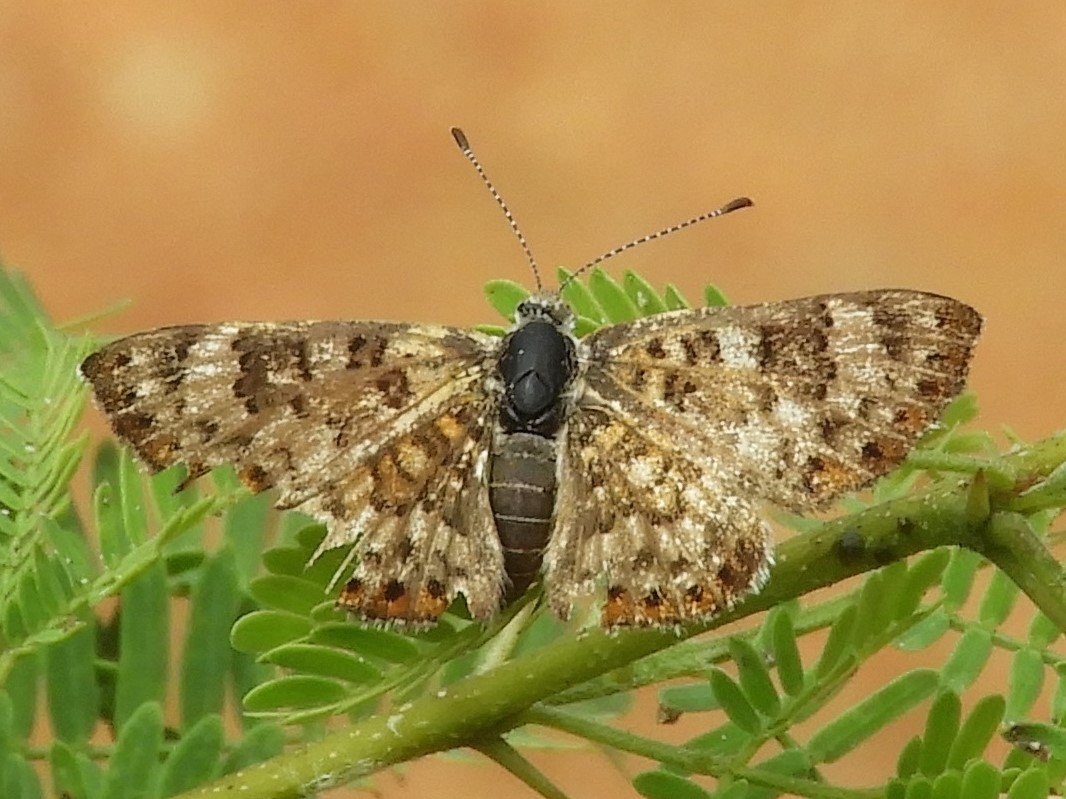

Scientific classification
- Domain: Eukaryota
- Kingdom: Animalia
- Phylum: Arthropoda
- Class: Insecta
- Order: Lepidoptera
- Family: Riodinidae
- Genus: Apodemia
- Species: A. walkeri

Binomial name
- Apodemia walkeri Godman & Salvin, [1886]

= Apodemia walkeri =

Species of butterfly

Apodemia walkeri, commonly known as Walker's metalmark, is a species of butterfly in the family Riodinidae (metalmarks), in the superfamily Papilionoidea (butterflies and skippers). The species was described by Frederick DuCane Godman and Osbert Salvin in 1886. It is found from north-western Costa Rica north through Mexico. It is an occasional visitor to the lower Rio Grande Valley in southern Texas. The habitat consists of subtropical scrubs and forests.
