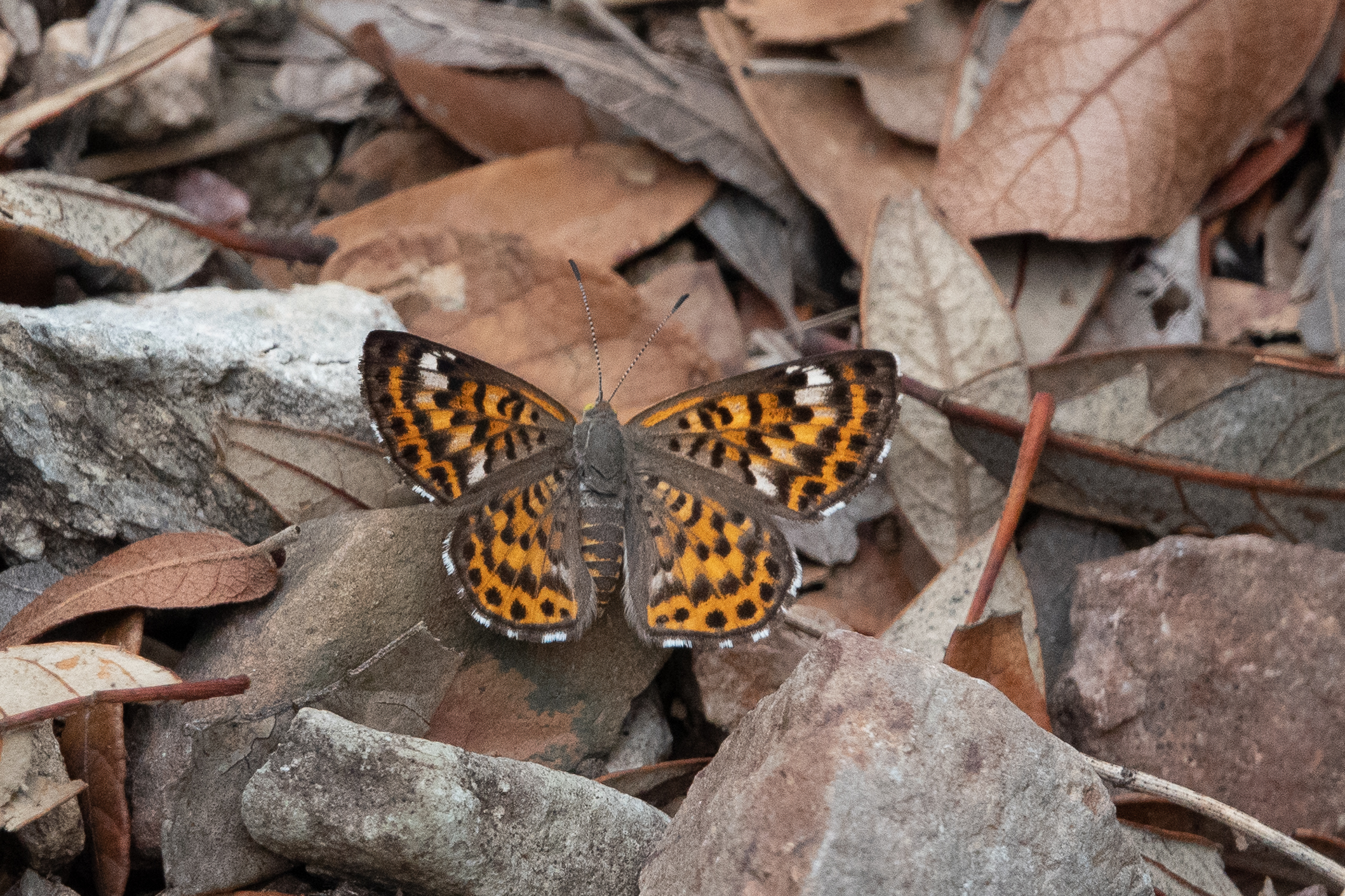
- Nais metalmark

Scientific classification
- Domain: Eukaryota
- Kingdom: Animalia
- Phylum: Arthropoda
- Class: Insecta
- Order: Lepidoptera
- Family: Riodinidae
- Tribe: Emesidini
- Genus: Apodemia
- Species: A. nais

Binomial name
- Apodemia nais (W. H. Edwards, 1877)

= Apodemia nais =

Species of butterfly

Apodemia nais, the nais metalmark, is a species of metalmark in the family of butterflies known as Riodinidae. It is found in North America (Southwestern United States and Mexico).
