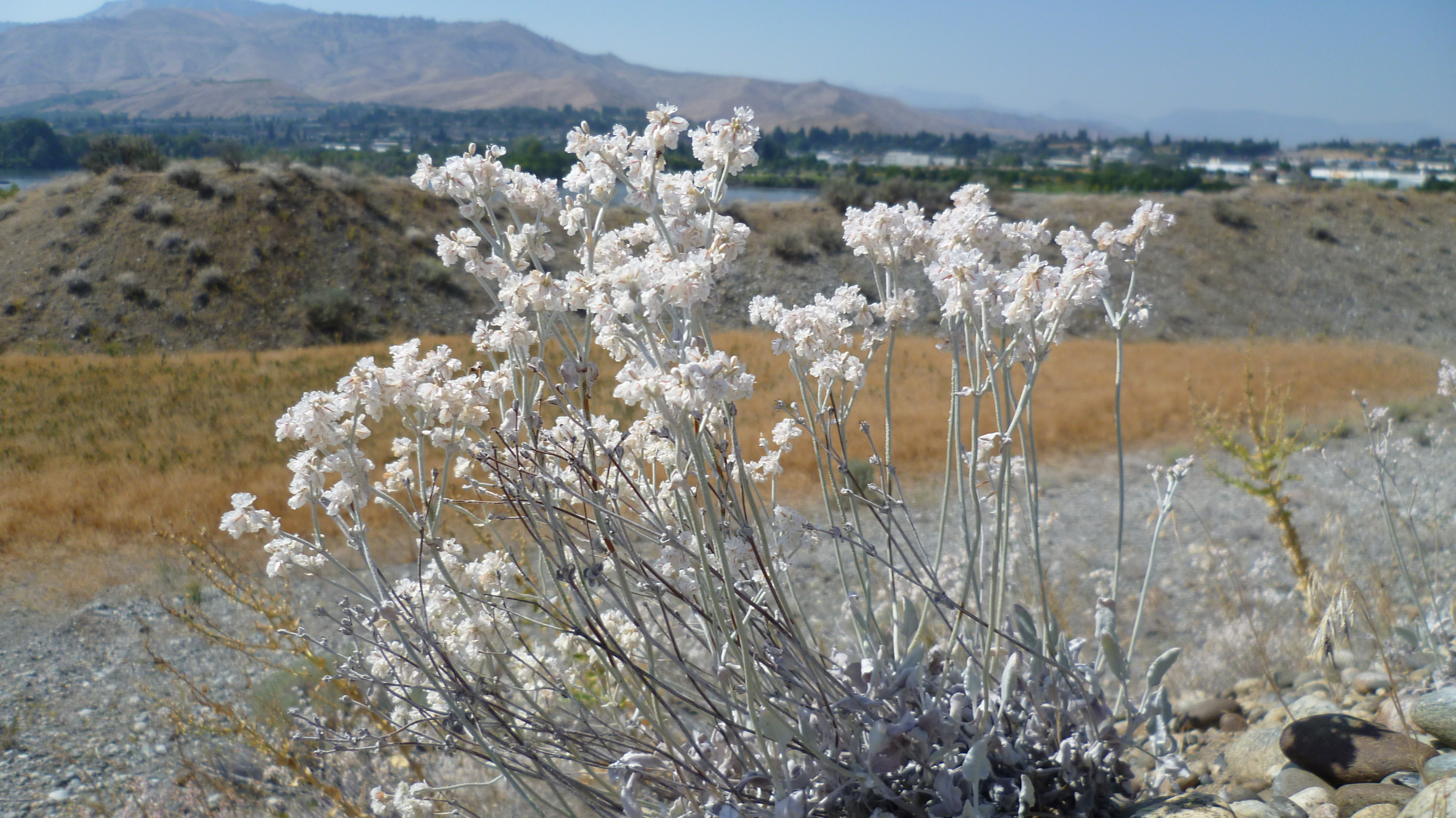

Conservation status
- Secure (NatureServe)

Scientific classification
- Kingdom: Plantae
- Clade: Tracheophytes
- Clade: Angiosperms
- Clade: Eudicots
- Order: Caryophyllales
- Family: Polygonaceae
- Genus: Eriogonum
- Species: E. niveum

Binomial name
- Eriogonum niveum Douglas ex Benth.

= Eriogonum niveum =

Species of wild buckwheat

Eriogonum niveum is a species of flowering plant in the buckwheat family known by the common name snow buckwheat. It is native to the Pacific Northwest of North America, where it occurs in British Columbia, Washington, Oregon, and Idaho. It flowers late in the summer.

== Description ==
This wild buckwheat is quite variable in appearance. It has spreading stems that grow usually grow erect, but may be decumbent or prostrate along the ground. It forms a hairy mat generally up to 40 to 60 centimetres (16 to 24 inches) tall and wide, but it can reach a height and width of one meter at times. Most of the leaves are in a tuft on the woody base of the plant. They are up to 6 centimeters long and have a woolly texture. The inflorescence is a series of branching stems with sparse clumps of small white, pink, or reddish flowers.

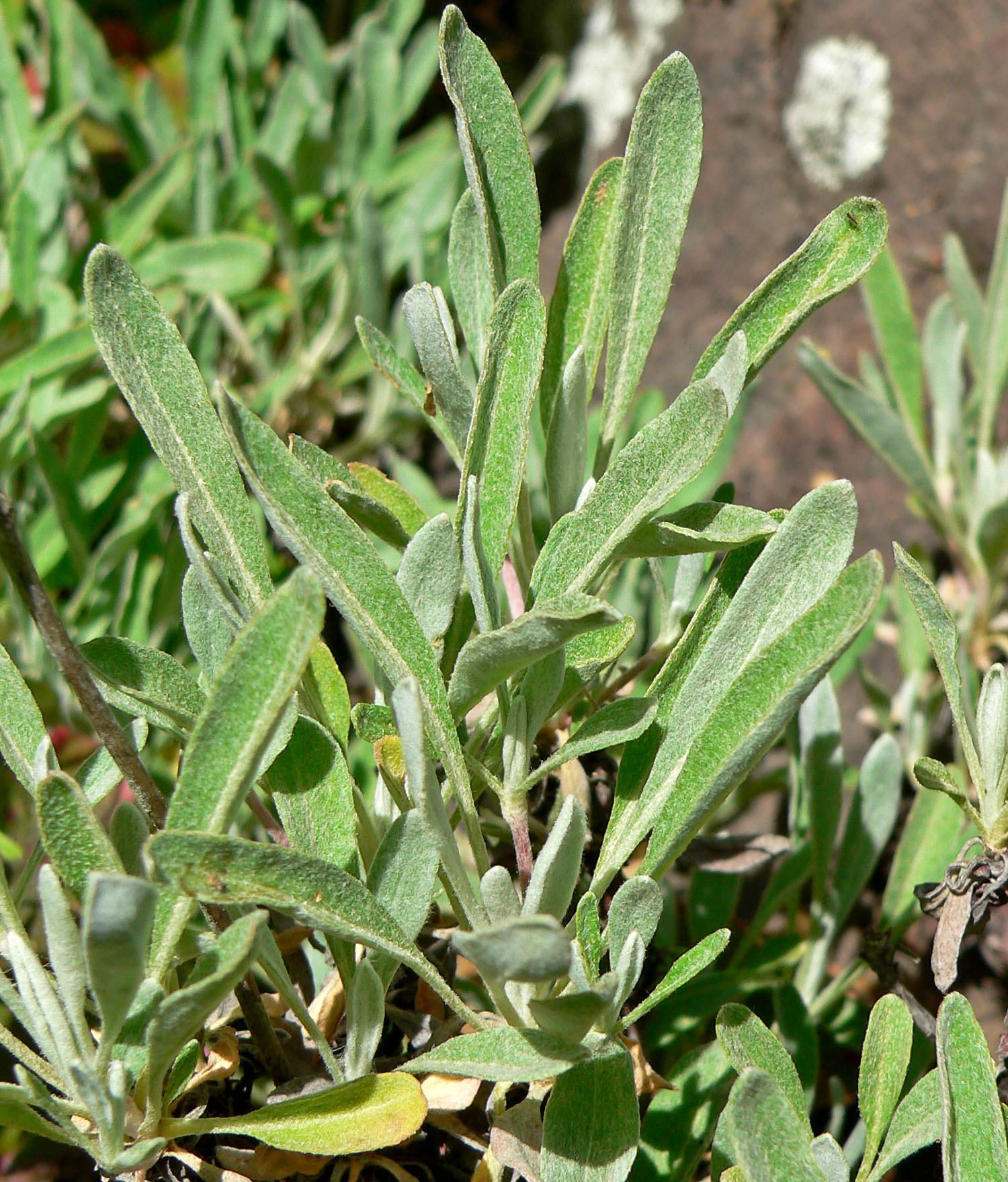
Eriogonum heracleoides, the parsnipflower buckwheat

Native American groups had several medicinal uses for this plant. It was used as a remedy for colds and cuts. The roots of this plant and Eriogonum heracleoides were brewed into a tea which was taken to treat diarrhea. This plant grows on grassy plains, sagebrush deserts, and ponderosa pine forests mainly east of the Cascade Range. It is a pioneer species, taking hold in thin, dry soils where other plants have not yet established. Other plants in the habitat may include Artemisia tridentata, Purshia tridentata, Juniperus occidentalis, Pseudoroegneria spicata, Sporobolus airoides, Elymus wawawaiensis, Poa secunda, Achnatherum hymenoides, and Nassella comata.

This plant can be cultivated. It can be planted in areas that have little soil, such as mine spoils. It can be used in xeriscaping. The cultivar 'Umatilla' is used for rangeland restoration and soil stabilization.

In the wild this plant provides food for mule deer and bighorn sheep. It is also utilized by the rare Mormon metalmark butterfly.
