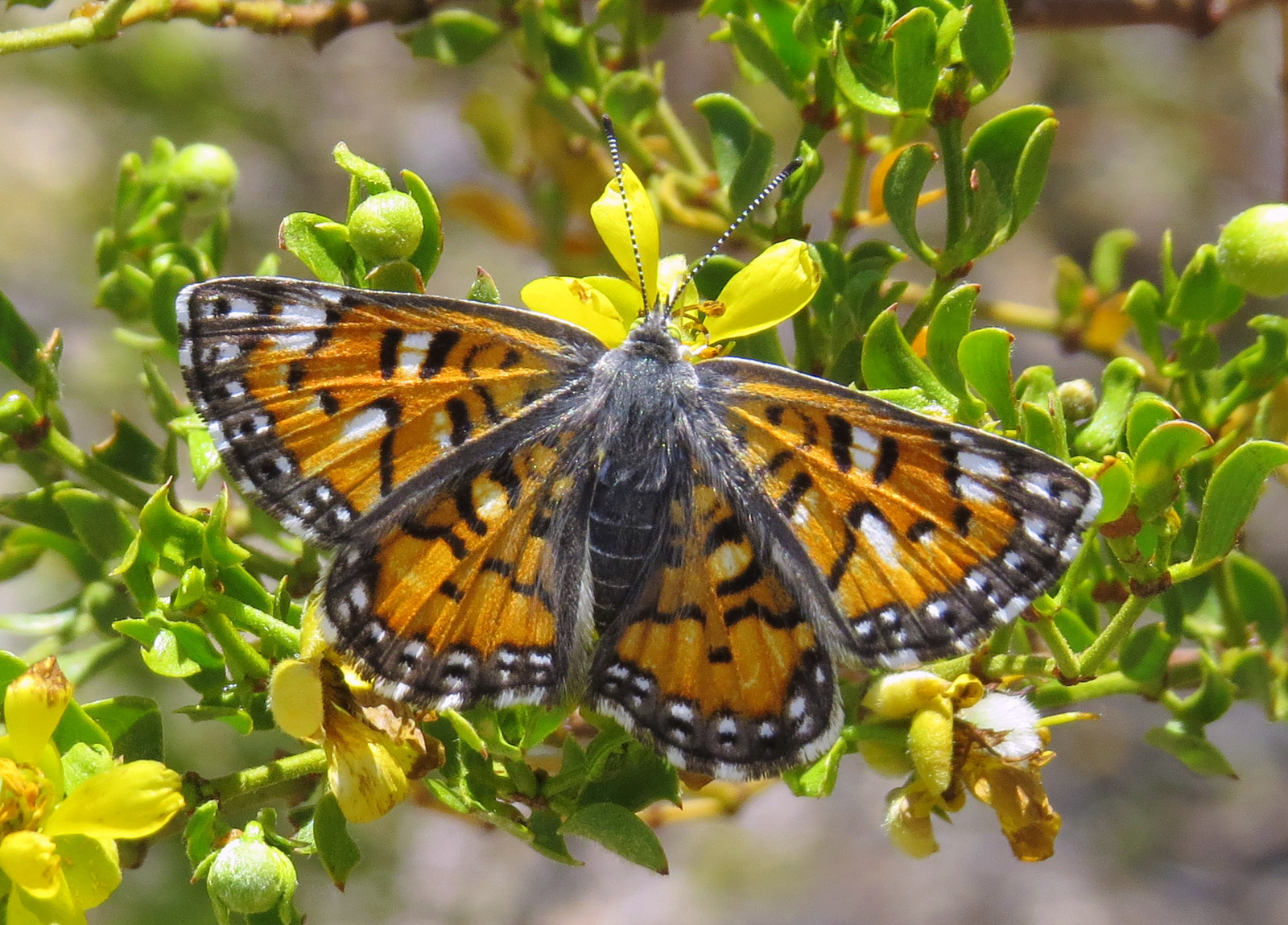

Scientific classification
- Domain: Eukaryota
- Kingdom: Animalia
- Phylum: Arthropoda
- Class: Insecta
- Order: Lepidoptera
- Family: Riodinidae
- Tribe: Emesidini
- Genus: Apodemia
- Species: A. duryi

Binomial name
- Apodemia duryi (W. H. Edwards, 1882)

= Apodemia duryi =

Species of butterfly

Apodemia duryi, known generally as the Organ Mountain metalmark or Mexican metalmark, is a species of metalmark in the butterfly family Riodinidae.

The MONA or Hodges number for Apodemia duryi is 4402.3.
