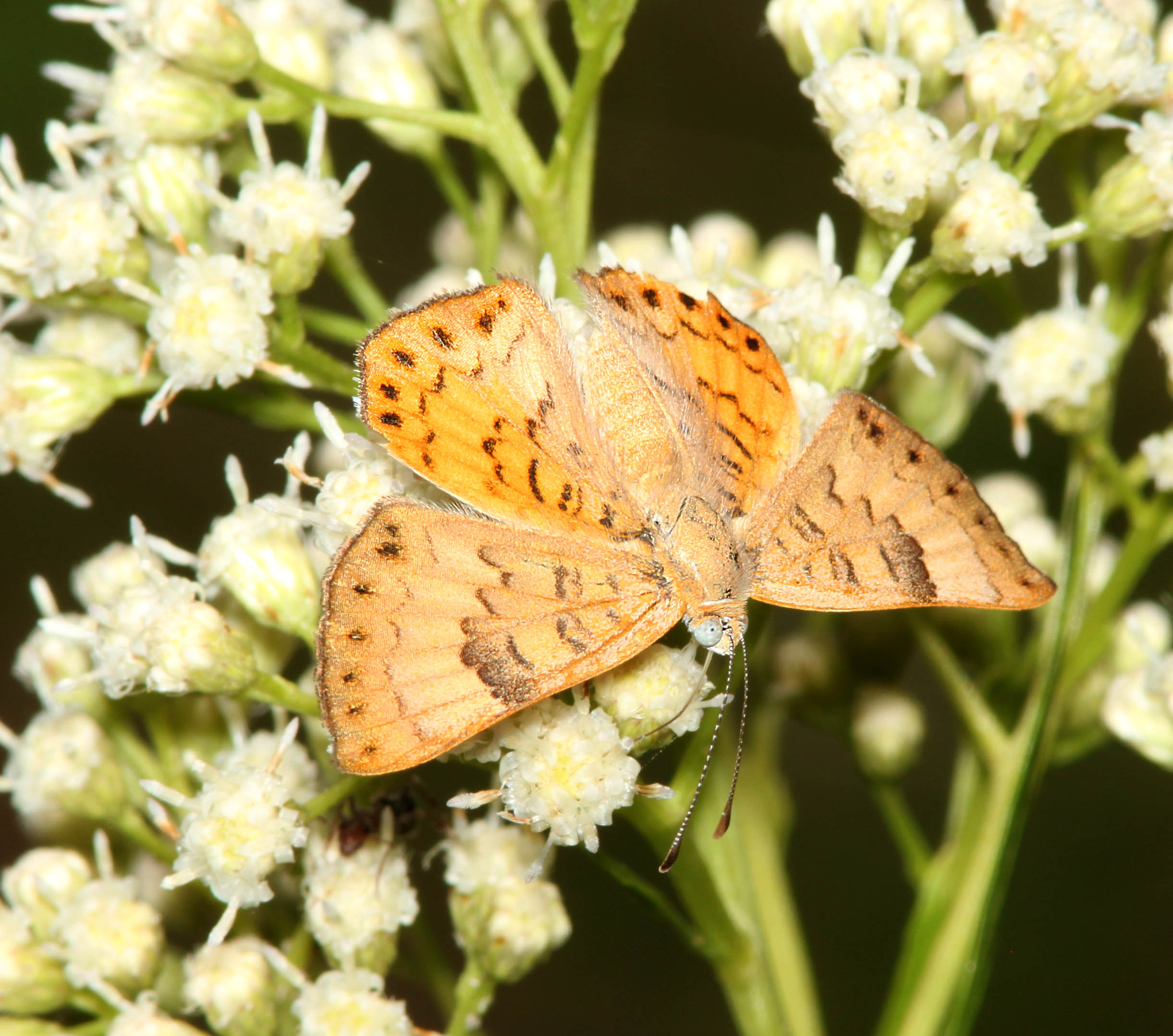

Scientific classification
- Kingdom: Animalia
- Phylum: Arthropoda
- Class: Insecta
- Order: Lepidoptera
- Family: Riodinidae
- Genus: Apodemia
- Species: A. zela

Binomial name
- Apodemia zela (Butler, 1870)

Synonyms
- Emesis zela Butler, 1870

= Apodemia zela =

Species of butterfly

Apodemia zela, the zela metalmark, is a species of metalmark in the butterfly family Riodinidae. It is found in North America.

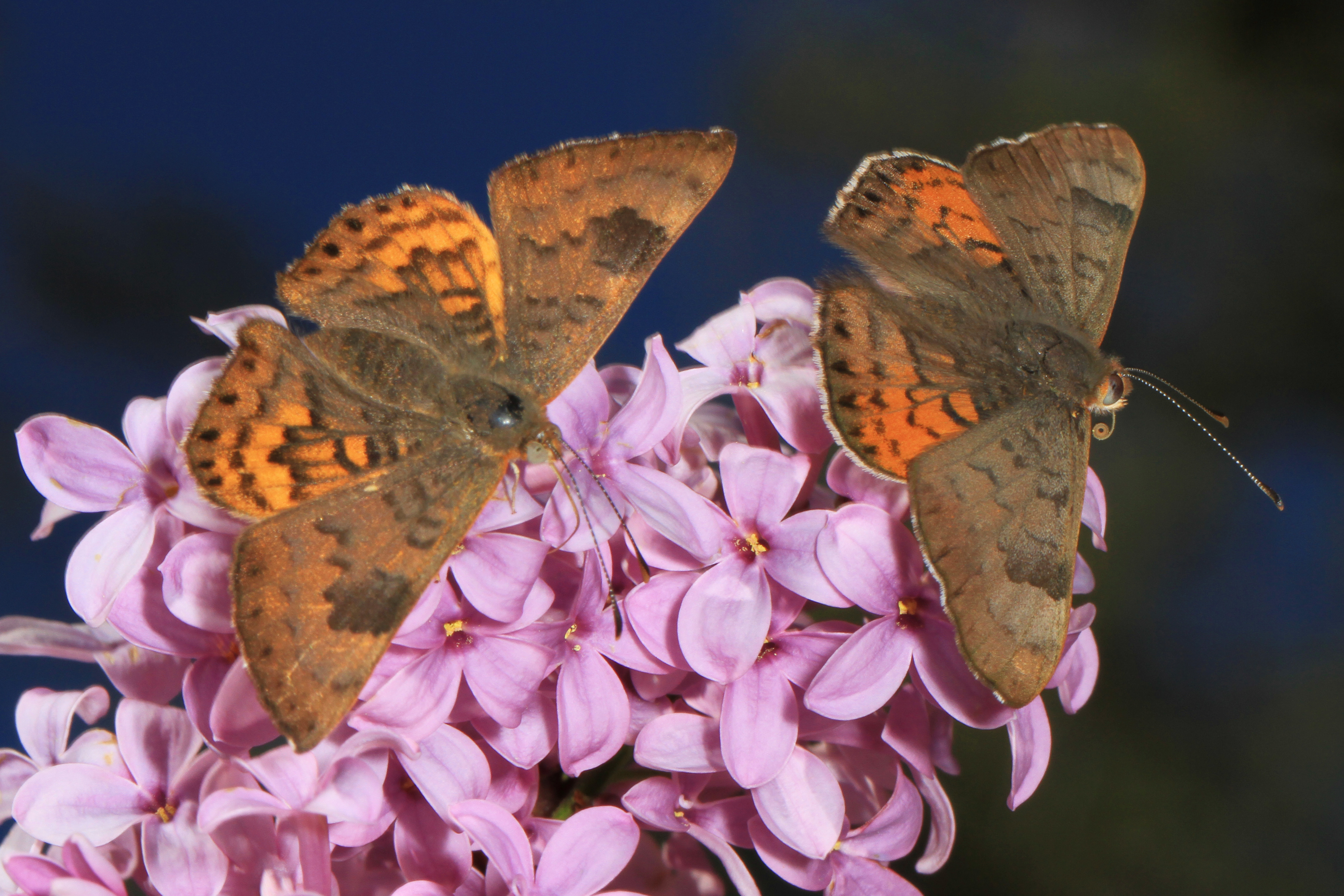
Zela metalmark, Apodemia zela

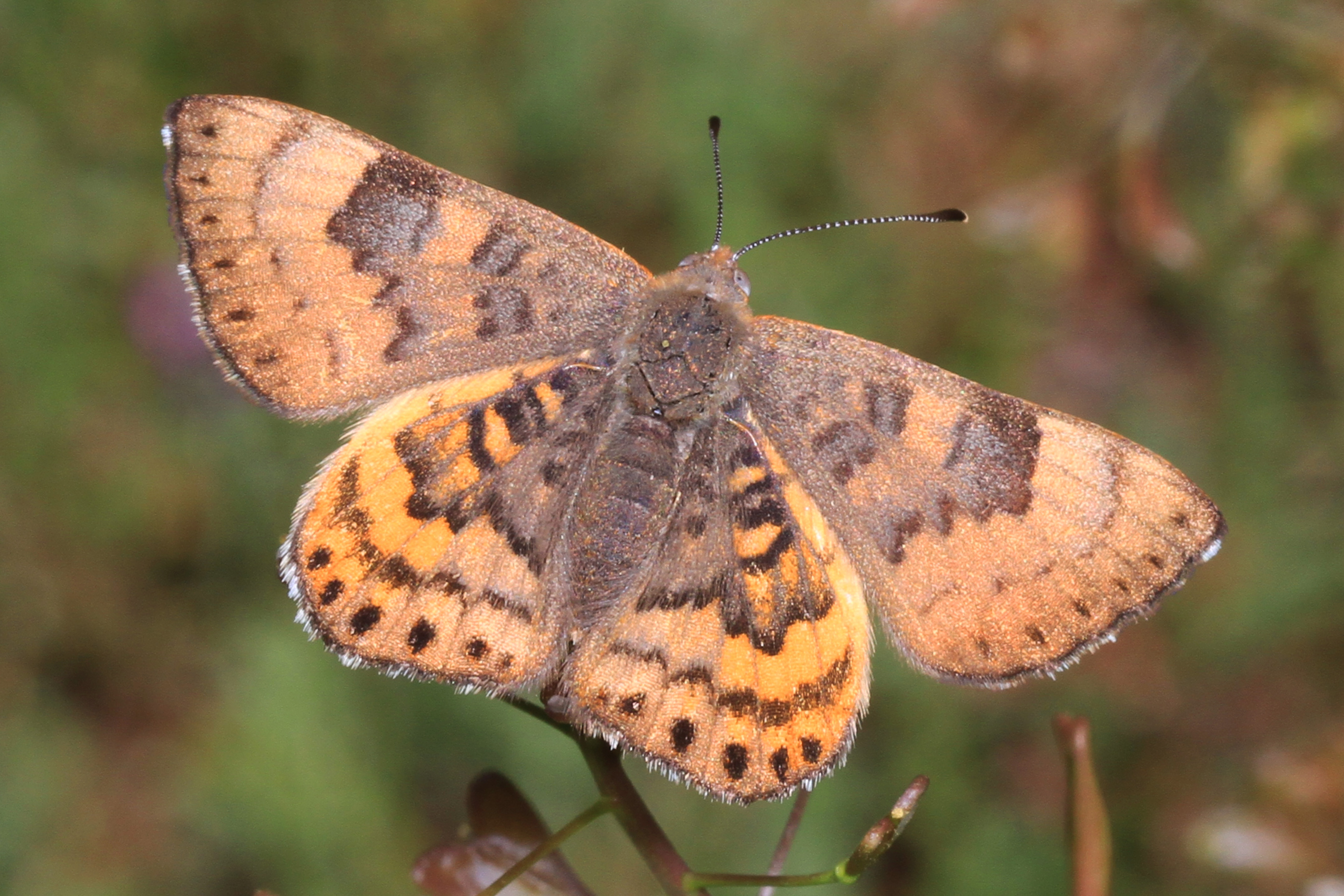
Zela metalmark, Apodemia zela

== Subspecies ==
- Apodemia zela cleis (W. H. Edwards, 1882)
- Apodemia zela zela Butler, 1870

(= Apodemia zela aureola Stichel, 1926)
