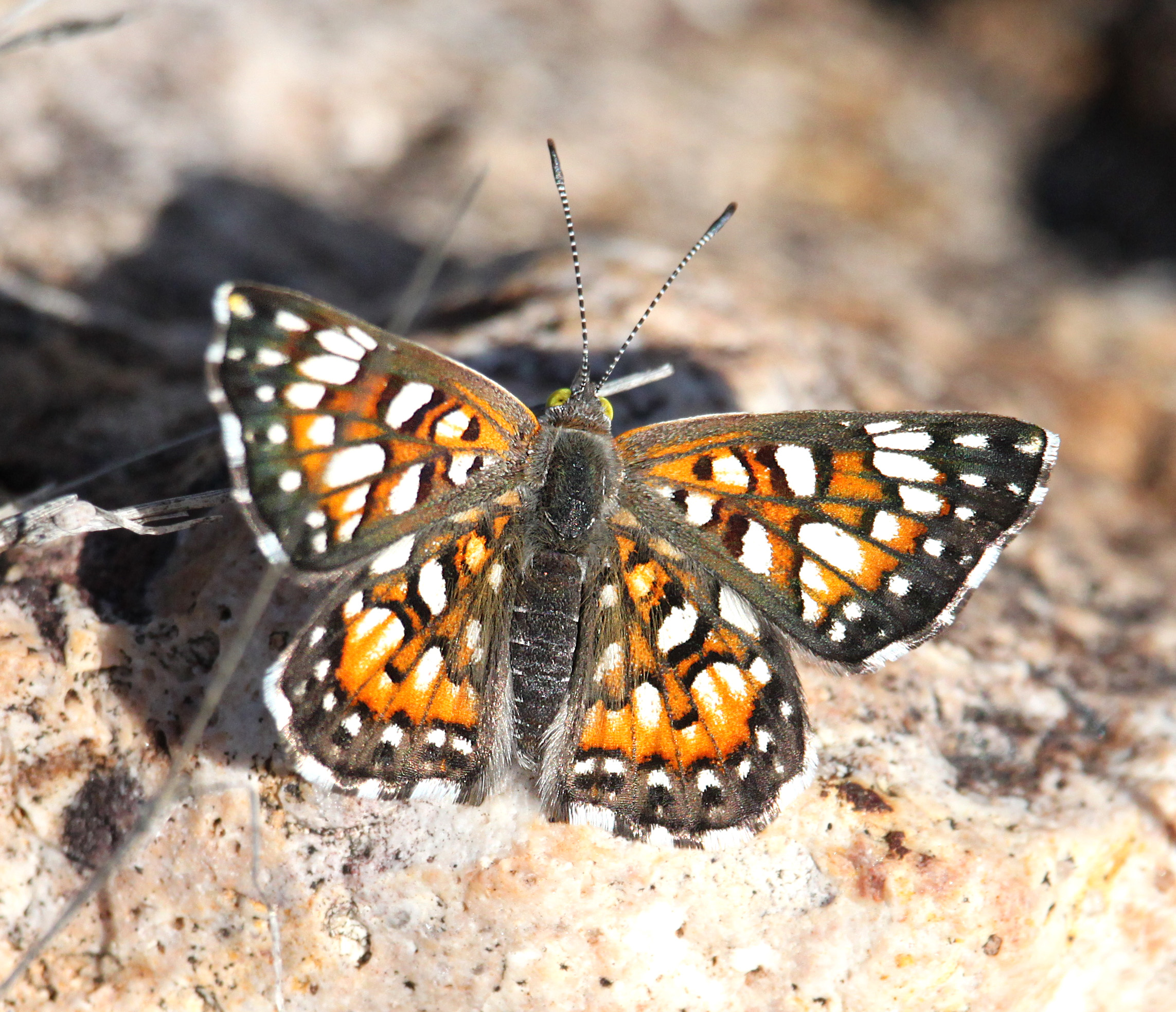
- Apodemia mejicanus

Scientific classification
- Domain: Eukaryota
- Kingdom: Animalia
- Phylum: Arthropoda
- Class: Insecta
- Order: Lepidoptera
- Family: Riodinidae
- Subfamily: Riodininae
- Tribe: Emesiini; Stichel, 1911

= Emesiini =

Tribe of butterflies

Emesiini is a tribe of metalmark butterflies in the family Riodinidae. There are at least 2 genera and about 15 described species in Emesiini.

== Genera ==
These two genera belong to the tribe Emesiini:

- Apodemia C. & R. Felder, [1865]
- Emesis Fabricius, 1807
