= Antioch Dunes National Wildlife Refuge =

Protected natural area in California, United States

- IUCN category IV (habitat/species management area)
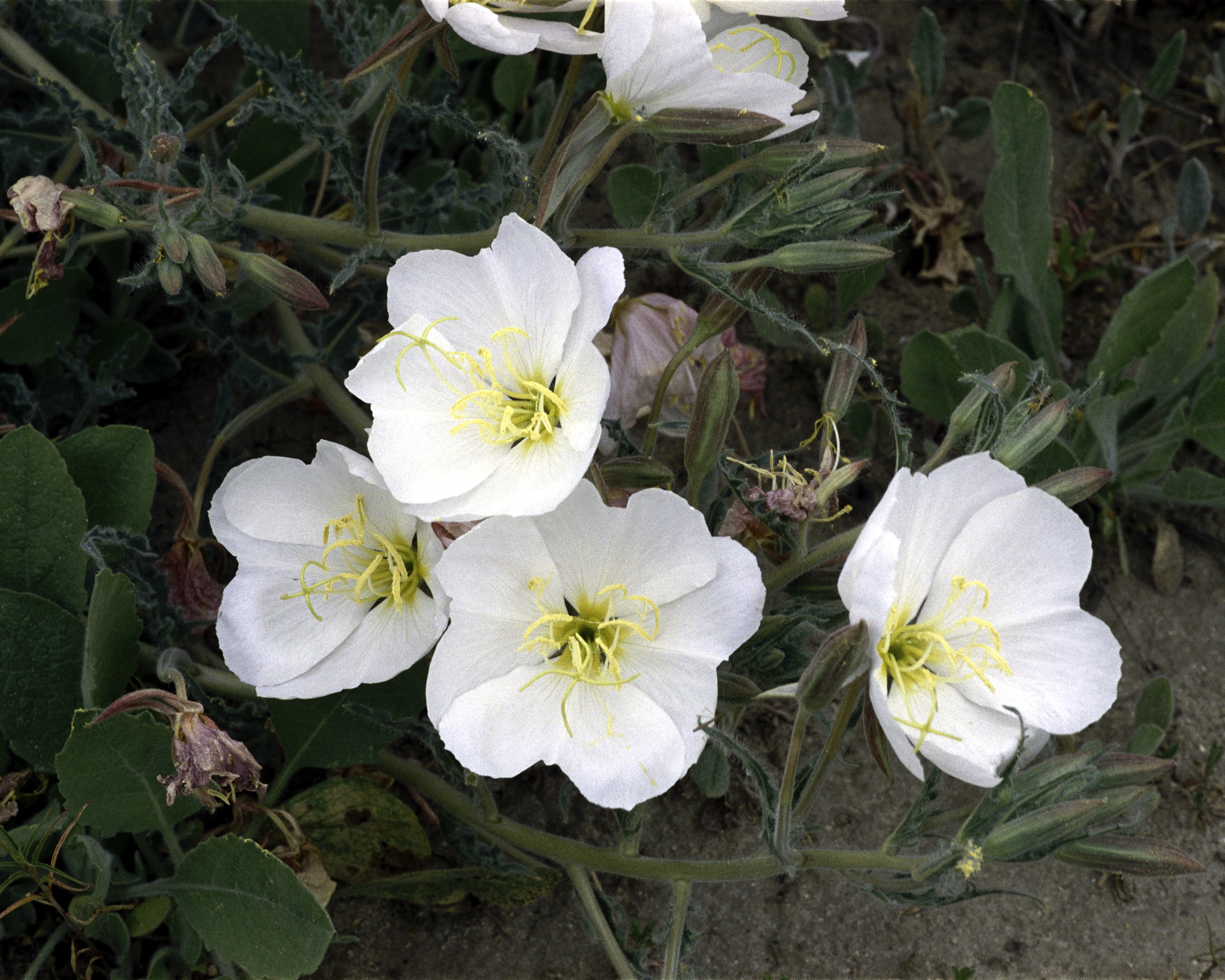
- Antioch Dunes evening primrose

- Location within California Location within the United States
- Interactive map of Antioch Dunes National Wildlife Refuge
- Location: Contra Costa County, California, United States
- Nearest city: Antioch, California
- Coordinates: 38.0151989°N 121.7938444°W
- Area: 55 acres (0.22 km^{2})
- Established: 1980
- Governing body: U.S. Fish and Wildlife Service
- Website: Official website

Antioch Dunes National Wildlife Refuge is a sensitive sand dune habitat located near the city of Antioch, California on the south shore of the San Joaquin River-Stockton Deepwater Shipping Channel. It serves as a refuge for three endangered species of plants and insects, and is closed to the public except for tours and events supervised by Refuge staff. The Refuge was established in 1980. It is managed by the U.S. Fish and Wildlife Service.

== Habitat restoration project ==
A project to restore wildlife habitat, sponsored by the Port of Stockton and implemented by the U.S. Army Corps of Engineers, began during 2013. This work involves dredging sandy spoil from the San Joaquin River and pumping it to the Antioch Dunes. The purpose is to spur population growth of the Lange's metalmark butterfly The process employs a hydraulic cutter-suction dredger, which pumps the sand-water mixture through a fish screen. The mixture flows through a series of berms, which separate the sand from the water, which is pumped back to the river. The sand is then distributed onshore. When the sand is in place, the project will replant it with buckwheat and two endangered plants.

== Endangered species ==
The species protected at Antioch Dunes are Lange's metalmark butterfly, the Antioch Dunes evening primrose, and the Contra Costa wallflower. See the Lange's metalmark article for some background on the decline of the Antioch Dunes habitat prior to the formation of the Refuge. The number of metalmark butterflies has declined from 2,342 in 1999 to 45 in 2006. There were 78 in 2013.

== Sources ==
This article incorporates public domain material from websites or documents of the United States Fish and Wildlife Service.

- Refuge profile
- Refuge website
