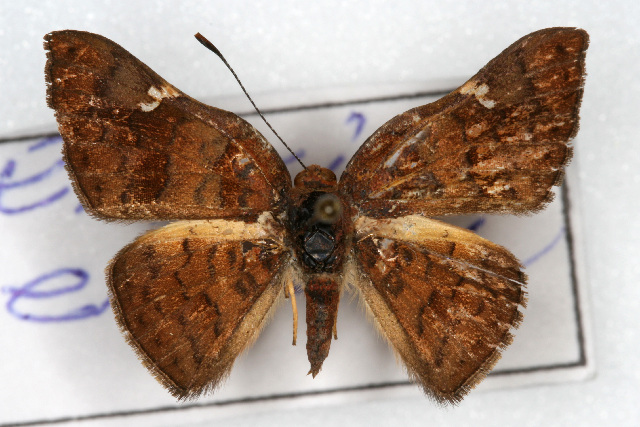

Scientific classification
- Kingdom: Animalia
- Phylum: Arthropoda
- Class: Insecta
- Order: Lepidoptera
- Family: Riodinidae
- Tribe: Emesidini
- Genus: Curvie
- Species: C. emesia

Binomial name
- Curvie emesia (Hewitson, 1867)

Synonyms
- Symmachia emesia Hewitson, 1867; Emesis emesia (Hewitson, 1867); Symmachia yucatanensis Godman & Salvin, 1886

= Curvie emesia =

Species of butterfly

Curvie emesia, the curve-winged metalmark, is a species of metalmark in the butterfly family Riodinidae. It is found in North America.

== Subspecies ==
These two subspecies belong to the species Emesis emesia:

- Emesis emesia emesia
- Emesis emesia yucatanensis Godman & Salvin, 1886
