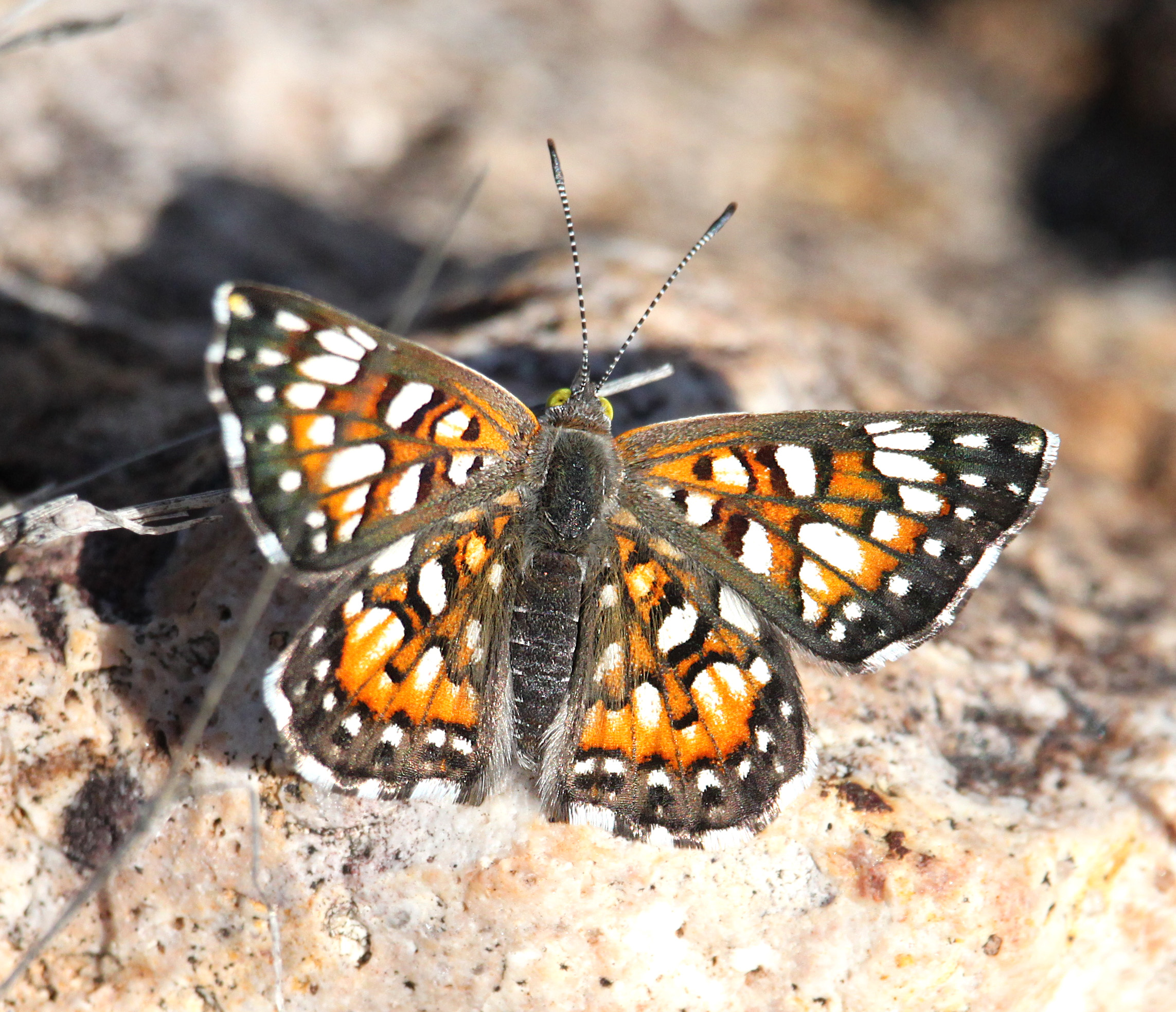

Scientific classification
- Domain: Eukaryota
- Kingdom: Animalia
- Phylum: Arthropoda
- Class: Insecta
- Order: Lepidoptera
- Family: Riodinidae
- Genus: Apodemia
- Species: A. mejicanus

Binomial name
- Apodemia mejicanus (Behr, 1865)

= Apodemia mejicanus =

Species of butterfly

Apodemia mejicanus, the Mexican metalmark or Sonoran metalmark, is a species of butterfly in the family Riodinidae (the metalmarks). It was first described by Hans Hermann Behr in 1865. It is found in North America.

== Subspecies ==
Three subspecies belong to Apodemia mejicanus:

- Apodemia mejicanus deserti Barnes & McDunnough, 1918^{i}
- Apodemia mejicanus mejicanus (Behr, 1865)^{i b}
- Apodemia mejicanus pueblo Scott, 1998^{i b}

Data sources: i = ITIS, c = Catalogue of Life, g = GBIF, b = BugGuide
