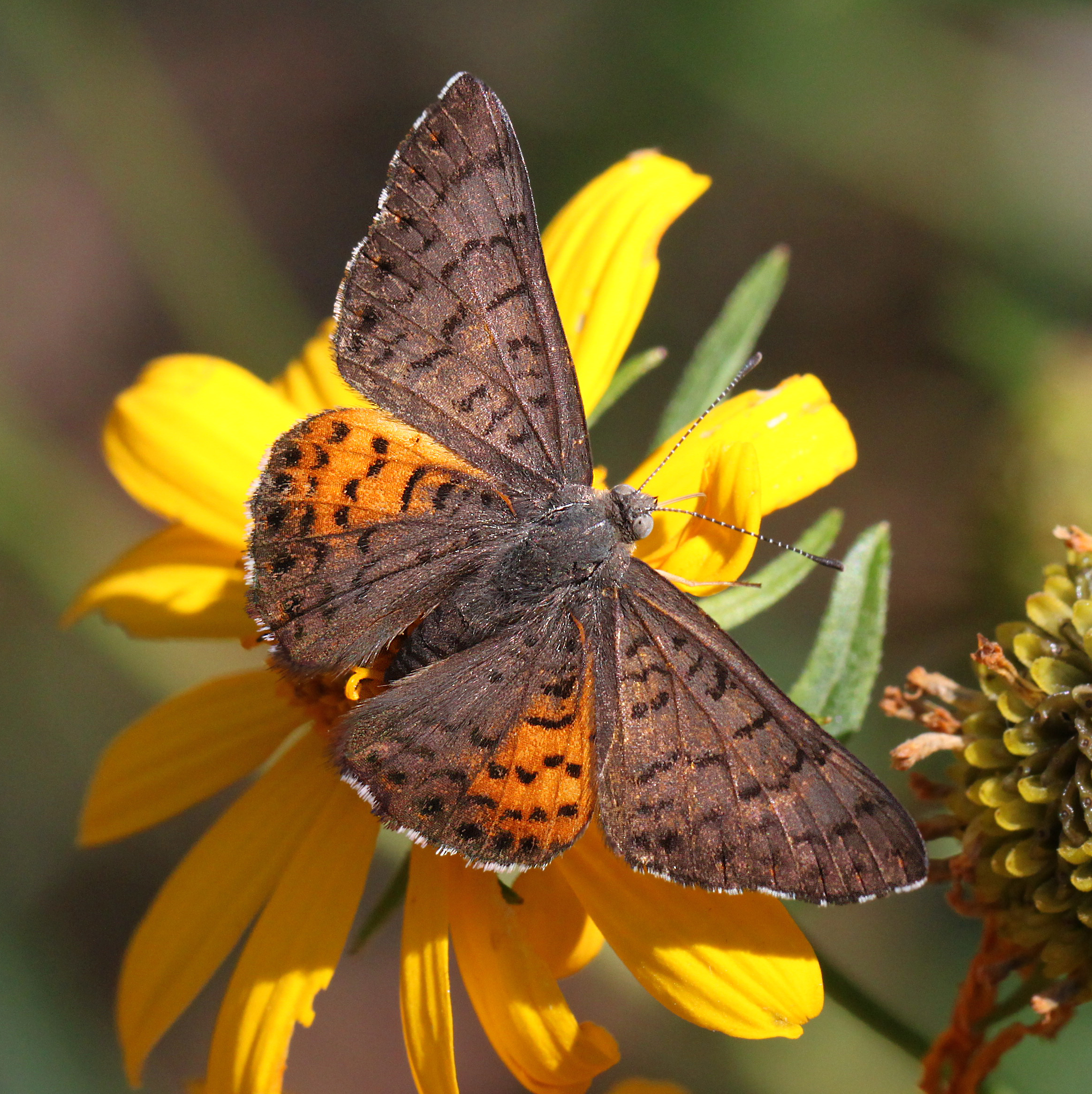

Scientific classification
- Domain: Eukaryota
- Kingdom: Animalia
- Phylum: Arthropoda
- Class: Insecta
- Order: Lepidoptera
- Family: Riodinidae
- Tribe: Emesidini
- Genus: Apodemia
- Species: A. ares

Binomial name
- Apodemia ares (W. H. Edwards, 1882)

Synonyms
- Emesis ares W. H. Edwards, 1882

= Apodemia ares =

Species of butterfly

Apodemia ares, the ares metalmark, is a species of metalmark in the butterfly family Riodinidae. It is found in North America.
