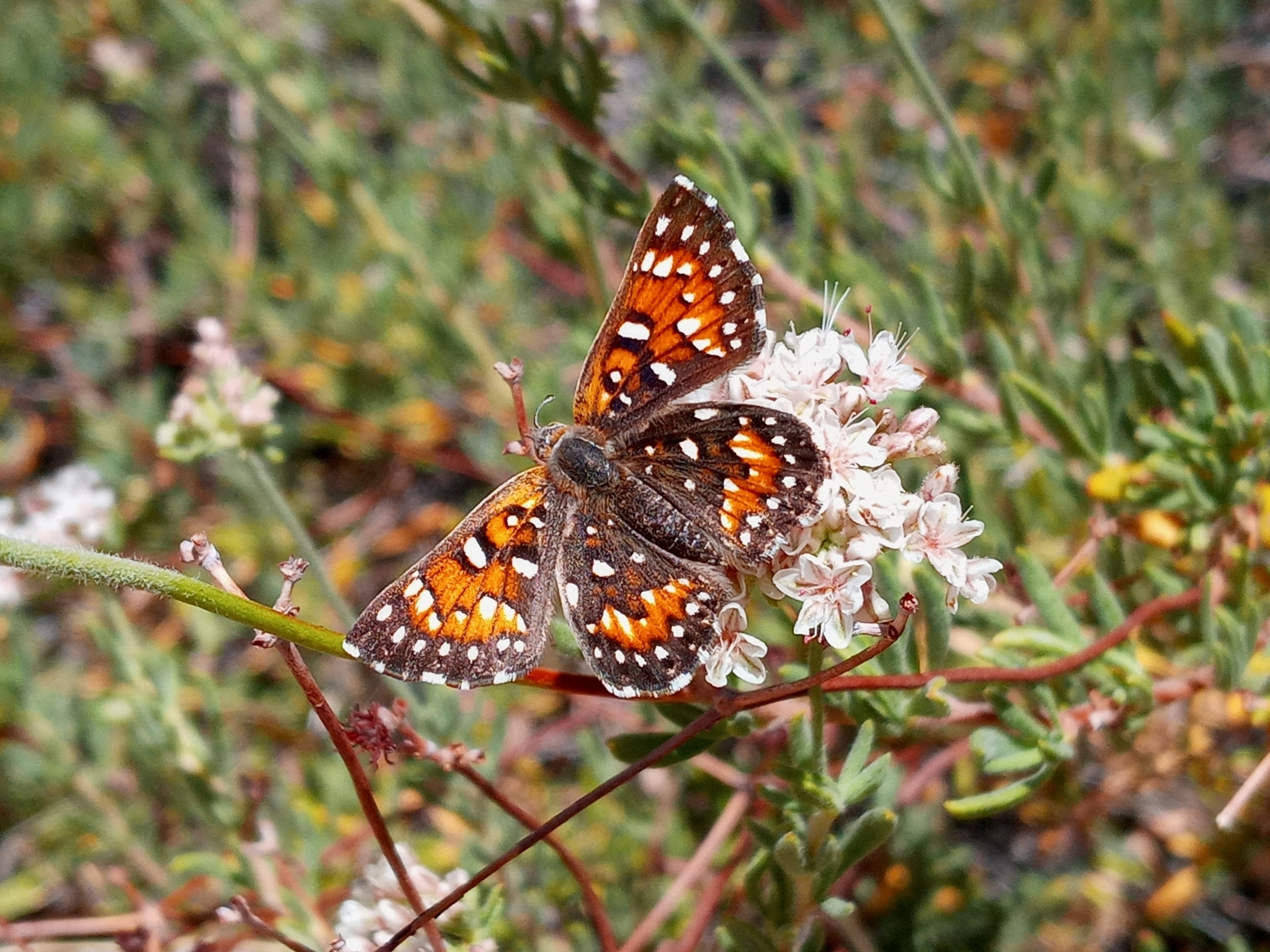
- Santa Clarita Valley, 2021

Scientific classification
- Domain: Eukaryota
- Kingdom: Animalia
- Phylum: Arthropoda
- Class: Insecta
- Order: Lepidoptera
- Family: Riodinidae
- Tribe: Emesidini
- Genus: Apodemia
- Species: A. virgulti

Binomial name
- Apodemia virgulti (Behr, 1865)

= Apodemia virgulti =

Species of butterfly

Apodemia virgulti, or Behr's metalmark, is a species of metalmark in the butterfly family Riodinidae.

== Subspecies ==
These eight subspecies belong to the species Apodemia virgulti:

- Apodemia virgulti arenaria J. Emmel & T. Emmel in T. Emmel, 1998
- Apodemia virgulti davenporti J. Emmel, T. Emmel & Pratt in T. Emmel, 1998
- Apodemia virgulti dialeucoides J. Emmel, T. Emmel & Pratt in T. Emmel, 1998
- Apodemia virgulti mojavelimbus J. Emmel, T. Emmel & Pratt in T. Emmel, 1998
- Apodemia virgulti nigrescens J. Emmel & T. Emmel in T. Emmel, 1998
- Apodemia virgulti peninsularis J. Emmel, T. Emmel & Pratt in T. Emmel, 1998
- Apodemia virgulti pratti J. Emmel & T. Emmel in T. Emmel, 1998
- Apodemia virgulti virgulti (Behr, 1865)
