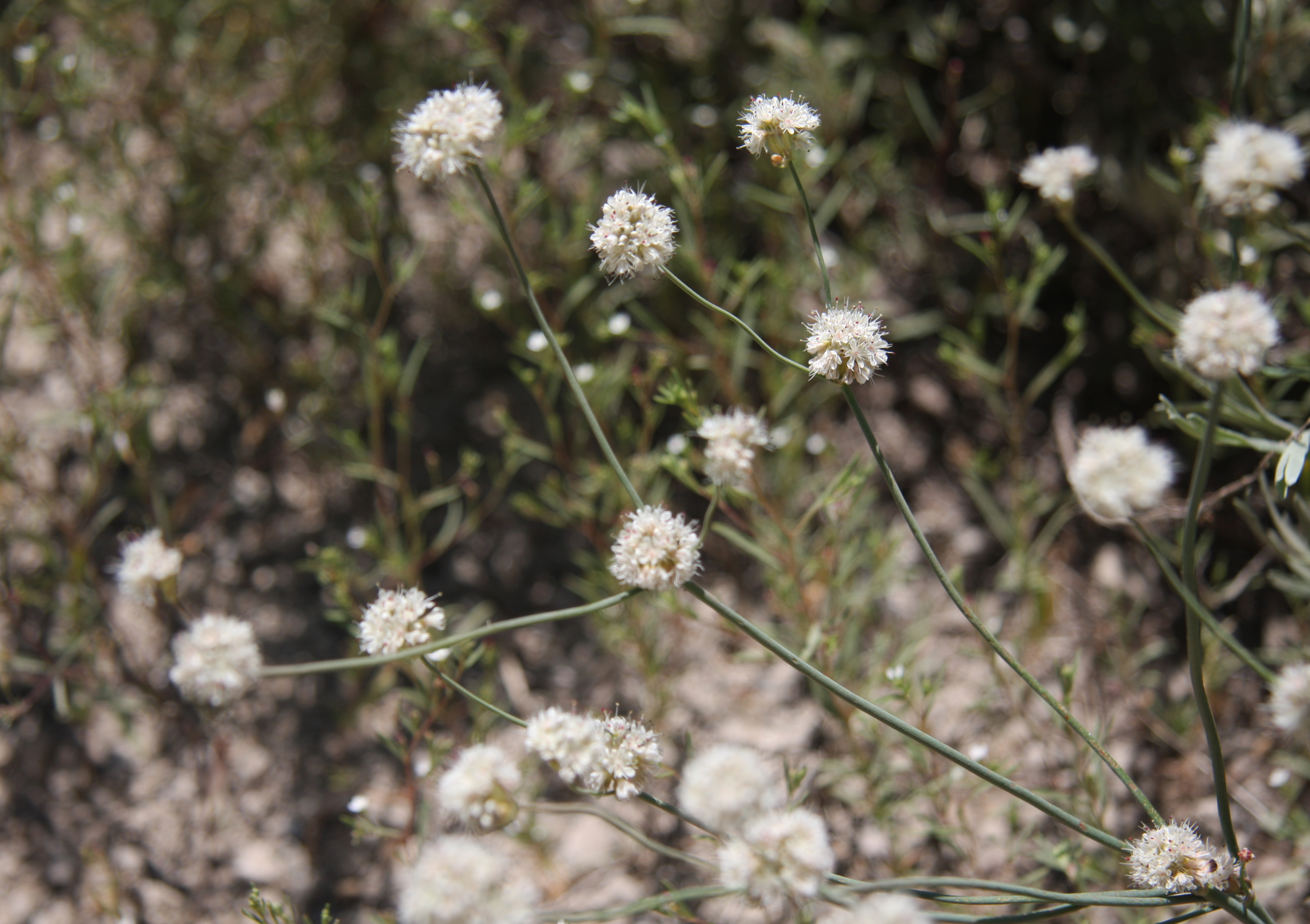

Scientific classification
- Kingdom: Plantae
- Clade: Tracheophytes
- Clade: Angiosperms
- Clade: Eudicots
- Order: Caryophyllales
- Family: Polygonaceae
- Genus: Eriogonum
- Species: E. nudum

Binomial name
- Eriogonum nudum Dougl. ex Benth.

= Eriogonum nudum =

Species of wild buckwheat

Eriogonum nudum is a perennial shrub of the wild buckwheat genus which is known by the common name naked buckwheat or nude buckwheat.

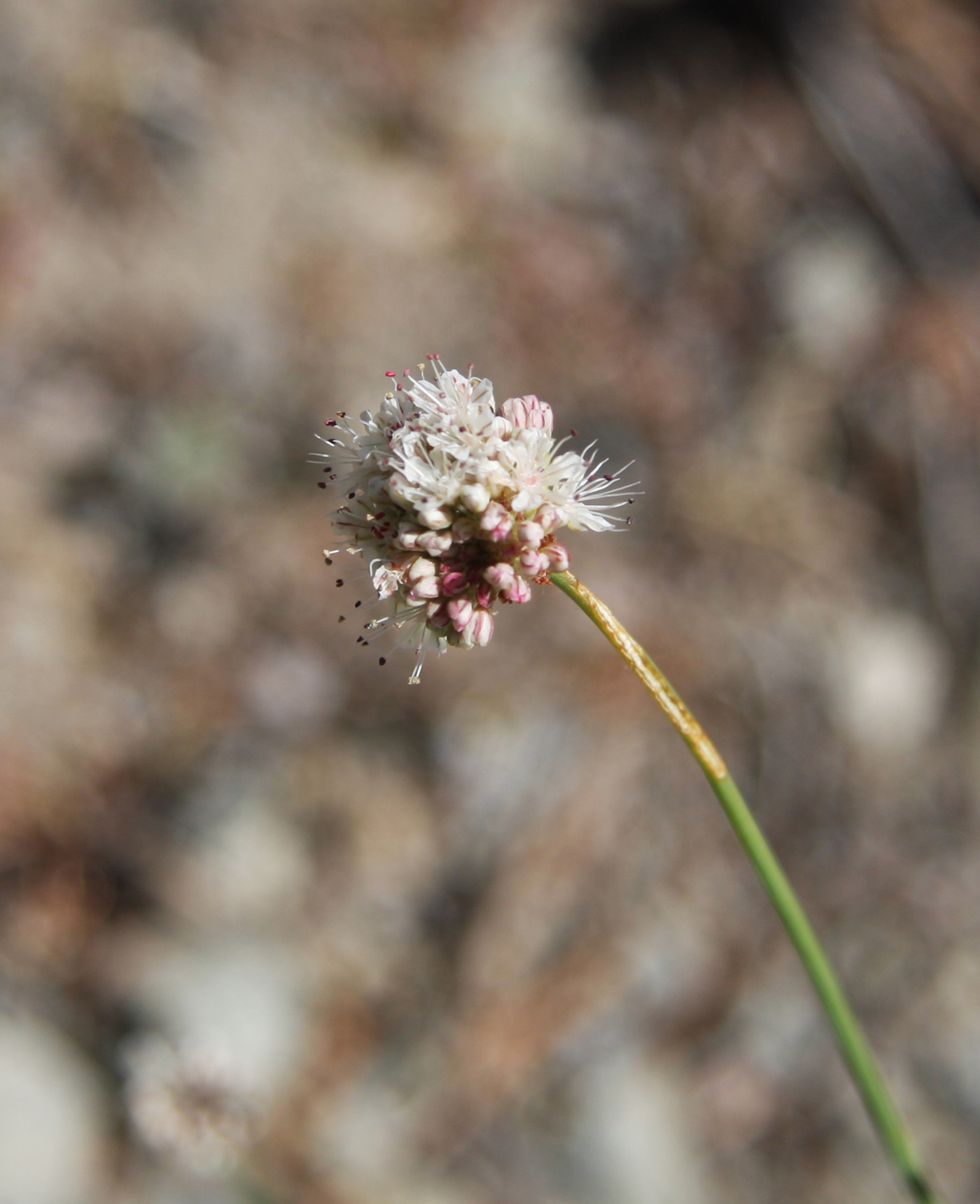
Eriogonum nudum flowerhead, close

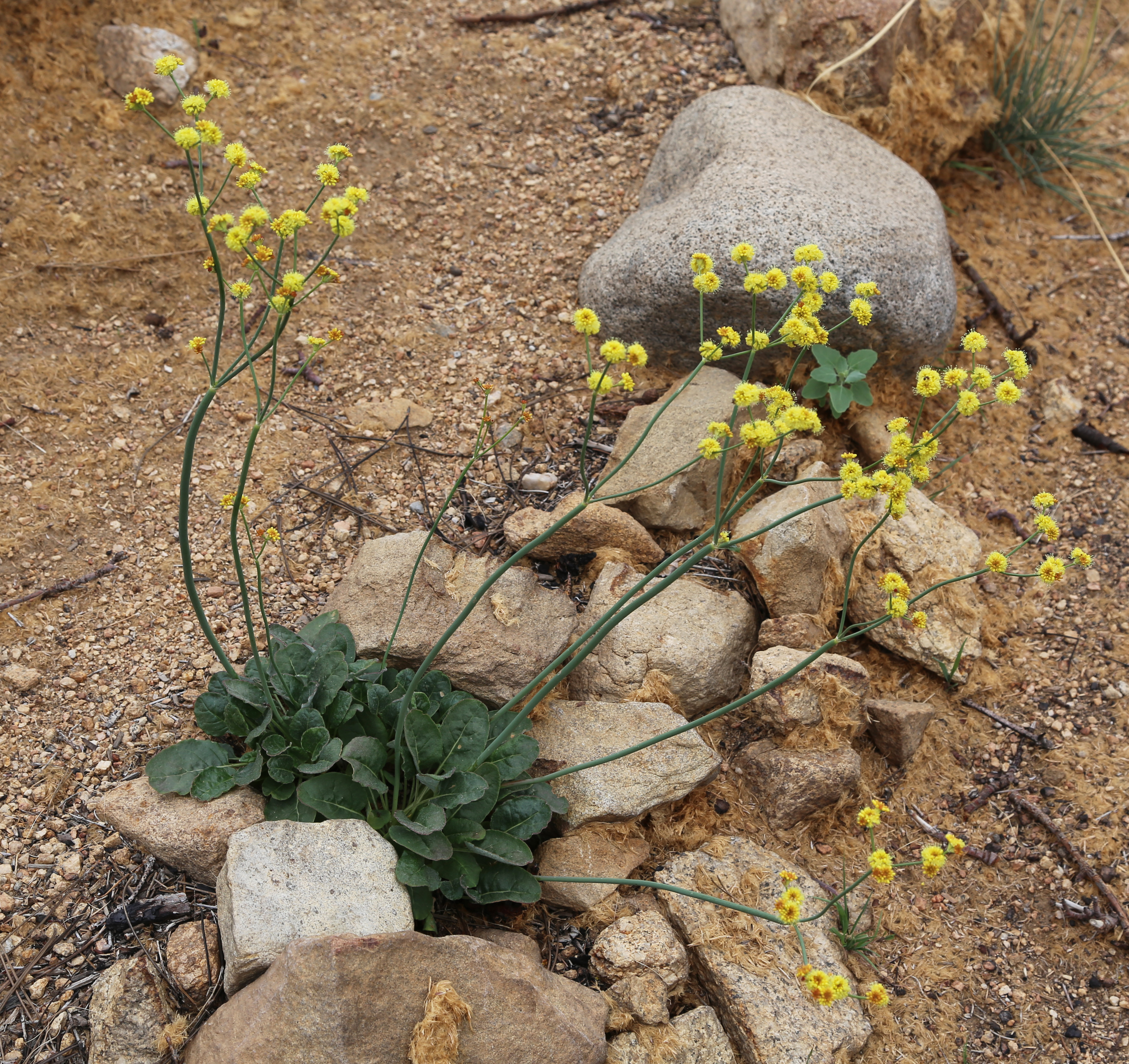
Nude buckwheat (var westonii), showing basal leaves and bare stems

== Description ==
The Eriogonum nudum plant is a tall, bare, leafless stem, bifurcating into more stems, each topped with rounded clusters of white or pale pink or yellow flowers growing up to six feet from a basal rosette at the ground, where the flat green leaves are located. An striking characteristic is that flower clusters typically occur at the branch as well as the branch tips. The naked stem gives the plant its common name.

== Distribution ==
Naked buckwheat can be found scattered around the west coast of the United States. This species has one of the widest ecological distributions of all of the buckwheats. It can be found at wet coastal sea level locales and the coldest, driest elevations of the Sierra Nevada, as well as many areas in between.

The species is not uncommon, but some specific varieties are quite rare.

== Butterflies ==
Nectar-feeding insects such as butterflies are attracted to buckwheat flowers. At least one butterfly subspecies (Apodemia mormo langei) uses naked buckwheat as its primary food source.

The complex of varieties and subspecies of naked buckwheat includes:

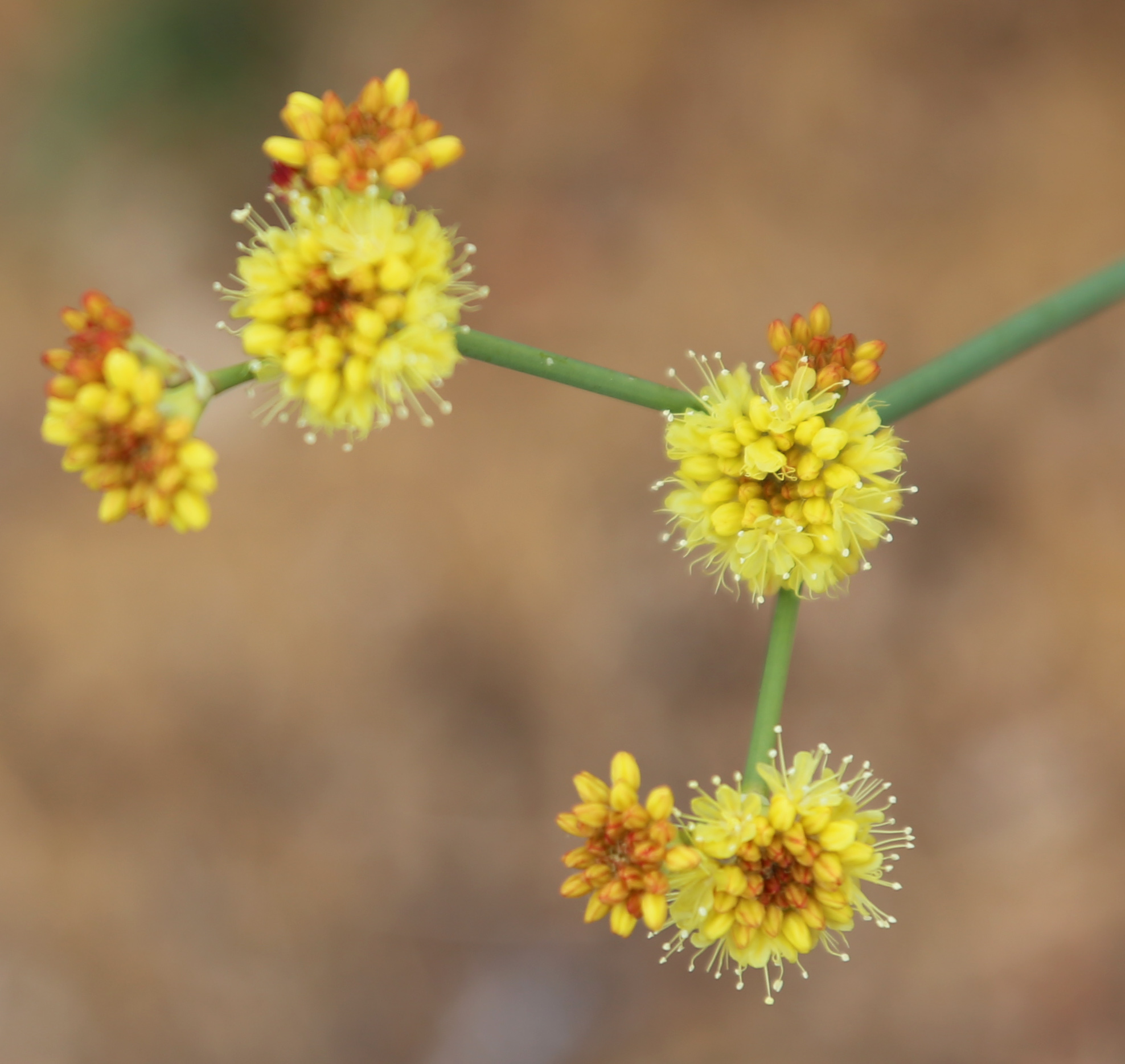
E. nudum var. westonii, yellow flowers at branch nodes & tips

- Eriogonum nudum var. auriculatum - eared naked buckwheat
- Eriogonum nudum var. decurrens - Ben Lomond buckwheat
- Eriogonum nudum var. deductum
- Eriogonum nudum var. indictum - protruding buckwheat
- Eriogonum nudum var. murinum - mouse buckwheat
- Eriogonum nudum var. nudum
- Eriogonum nudum var. oblongifolium - oblong-leaved buckwheat
- Eriogonum nudum var. paralinum - Del Norte buckwheat
- Eriogonum nudum ssp. pauciflorum - few-flowered naked buckwheat
- Eriogonum nudum var. psychicola - Antioch Dunes buckwheat
- Eriogonum nudum var. pubiflorum - hairy-flowered buckwheat
- Eriogonum nudum var. regirivum - Kings River buckwheat
- Eriogonum nudum var. scapigerum
- Eriogonum nudum var. westonii - Weston's buckwheat
- Eriogonum nudum var. gramineu
- Eriogonum nudum ssp. saxicola
