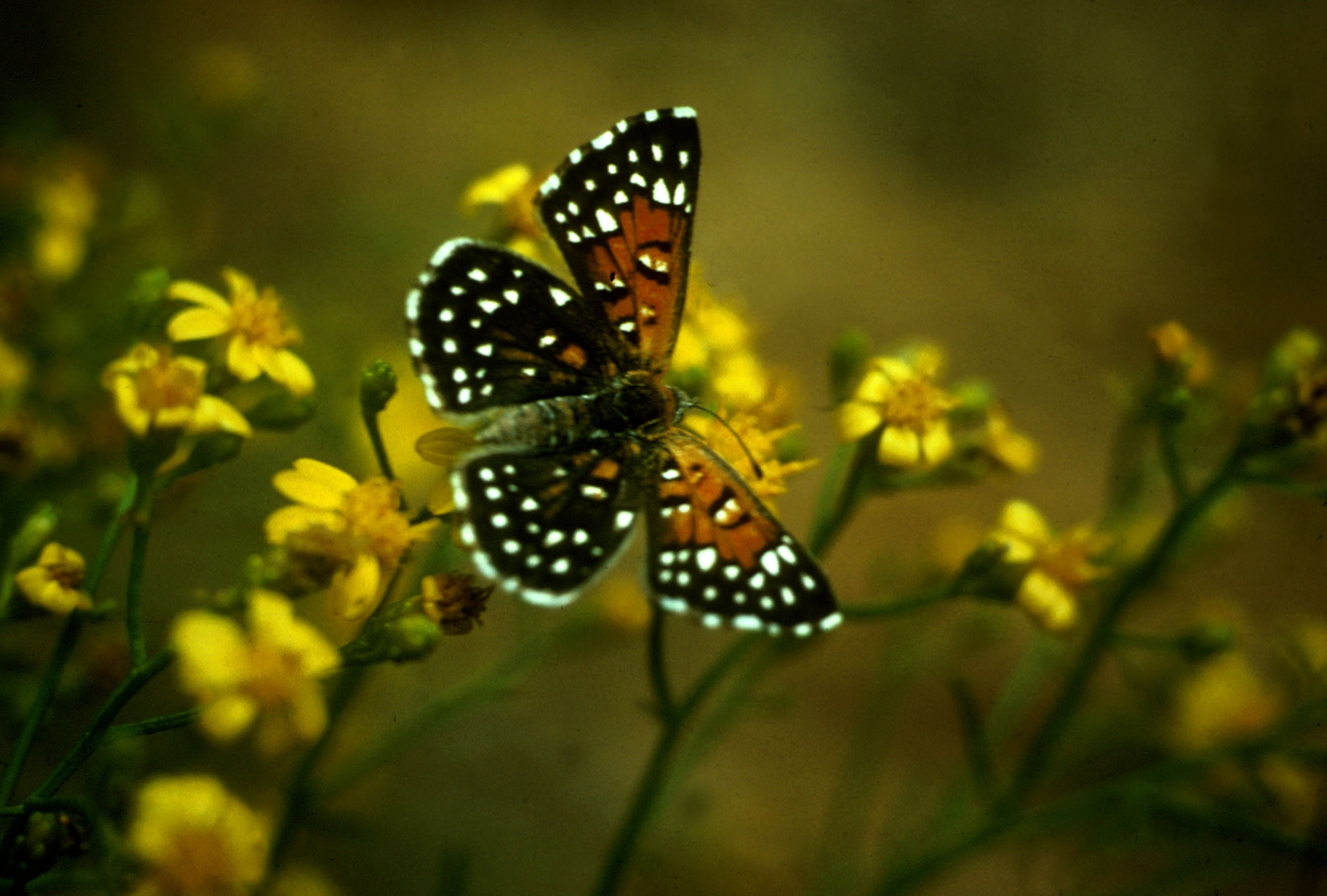
- Lange's metalmark (Apodemia mormo langei)

Scientific classification
- Domain: Eukaryota
- Kingdom: Animalia
- Phylum: Arthropoda
- Class: Insecta
- Order: Lepidoptera
- Family: Riodinidae
- Tribe: Emesidini
- Genus: Apodemia (C. Felder & R. Felder, 1865)

Type species
- Lemonias mormo (C. & R. Felder, 1859)

Species
- See text

Synonyms
- Chrysobia Boisduval, 1869; Polystigma Godman & Salvin, 1886

= Apodemia =

Genus of butterflies

Apodemia is a New World genus of metalmark butterflies found from Canada to Brazil.

== Species ==
Apodemia contains the following species:

- Apodemia arnacis (Stichel, 1928)
- Apodemia ares (Edwards, 1882)
- Apodemia chisosensis Freeman, 1964 – Chisos metalmark
- Apodemia duryi (Edwards, 1882) – Mexican metalmark
- Apodemia hepburni Godman & Salvin, 1886 – Hepburn's metalmark
- Apodemia hypoglauca (Godman & Salvin, 1878) – falcate metalmark
- Apodemia mejicanus (Behr, 1865) – Sonoran metalmark or Mexican metalmark
- Apodemia mormo (C. & R. Felder, 1859) – Mormon metalmark (type species)
- Apodemia multiplaga Schaus, 1902 – narrow-winged metalmark
- Apodemia murphyi Austin, 1988 – Murphy's metalmark
- Apodemia nais (Edwards, 1876) – nais metalmark
- Apodemia palmeri (Edwards, 1870) – Palmer's metalmark or gray metalmark
- Apodemia planeca R. de la Maza & J. de la Maza, 2017
- Apodemia selvatica R. de la Maza & J. de la Maza, 2017
- Apodemia virgulti (Behr, 1865) – Behr's metalmark
- Apodemia walkeri Godman & Salvin, 1886 – Walker's metalmark
- Apodemia zela (Butler, 1870)
