= List of butterflies of Mexico =

Location of Mexico

This is a list of butterflies of Mexico. According to this list, there are 2,045 butterfly species present in Mexico.

== Papilionidae ==
=== Baroniinae ===
- Baronia brevicornis brevicornis – baronia
- Baronia brevicornis rufodiscalis – baronia

=== Papilioninae ===
==== Troidini ====
- Battus eracon – West-Mexican swallowtail
- Battus ingenuus – Dyar's swallowtail
- Battus laodamas copanae – green-patch swallowtail
- Battus laodamas iopas – green-patch swallowtail
- Battus lycidas – Cramer's swallowtail
- Battus philenor acauda – Yucatán pipevine swallowtail
- Battus philenor insularis – Revillagigedo pipevine swallowtail
- Battus philenor orsua – Tres Marias pipevine swallowtail
- Battus philenor philenor – pipevine swallowtail
- Battus polydamas polydamas – Polydamas swallowtail
- Parides alopius – white-dotted cattleheart
- Parides anchises marthilia – Chiapas cattleheart
- Parides childrenae childrenae – green-celled cattleheart
- Parides erithalion polyzelus – variable cattleheart
- Parides erithalion trichopus – variable cattleheart
- Parides eurimedes mylotes – true cattleheart
- Parides iphidamas iphidamas – Iphidamas cattleheart
- Parides montezuma – Montezuma's cattleheart
- Parides panares lycimenes – wedge-spotted cattleheart
- Parides panares panares – wedge-spotted cattleheart
- Parides photinus – pink-spotted cattleheart
- Parides sesostris zestos – emerald-patched cattleheart

==== Leptocircini ====
- Eurytides agesilaus fortis – short-lined kite-swallowtail
- Eurytides agesilaus neosilaus – short-lined kite-swallowtail
- Eurytides calliste calliste – yellow kite-swallowtail
- Eurytides dioxippus lacandones – thick-bordered kite-swallowtail
- Eurytides epidaus epidaus – Mexican kite-swallowtail
- Eurytides epidaus fenochionis – Mexican kite-swallowtail
- Eurytides epidaus tepicus – Mexican kite-swallowtail
- Eurytides macrosilaus penthesilaus – five-striped kite-swallowtail
- Eurytides marcellus – zebra swallowtail
- Eurytides philolaus philolaus – dark kite-swallowtail
- Eurytides salvini – Salvin's kite-swallowtail
- Eurytides thyastes marchandii – orange kite-swallowtail
- Eurytides thyastes occidentalis – orange kite-swallowtail
- Mimoides ilus branchus – Ilus swallowtail
- Mimoides ilus occiduus – Ilus swallowtail
- Mimoides phaon phaon – variable swallowtail
- Mimoides thymbraeus aconophos – white-crescent swallowtail
- Mimoides thymbraeus thymbraeus – white-crescent swallowtail

==== Papilionini ====
- Papilio alexiares alexiares – Mexican tiger swallowtail
- Papilio alexiares garcia – Garcia tiger swallowtail
- Papilio anchisiades idaeus – ruby-spotted swallowtail
- Papilio androgeus epidaurus – Androgeus swallowtail
- Papilio astyalus bajaensis – broad-banded swallowtail
- Papilio astyalus pallas – broad-banded swallowtail
- Papilio cresphontes – giant swallowtail
- Papilio erostratus erostratinus – Erostratus swallowtail
- Papilio erostratus erostratus – Erostratus swallowtail
- Papilio erostratus vazquezae – Erostratus swallowtail
- Papilio esperanza – Esperanza swallowtail
- Papilio eurymedon – pale tiger swallowtail
- Papilio garamas abderus – magnificent swallowtail
- Papilio garamas baroni – magnificent swallowtail
- Papilio garamas electryon – magnificent swallowtail
- Papilio garamas garamas – magnificent swallowtail
- Papilio glaucus glaucus – eastern tiger swallowtail
- Papilio indra pergamus – Indra swallowtail
- Papilio machaon bairdii – Baird's swallowtail
- Papilio multicaudata grandiosus – two-tailed tiger swallowtail
- Papilio multicaudata multicaudata – two-tailed tiger swallowtail
- Papilio multicaudata pusillus – two-tailed tiger swallowtail
- Papilio ornythion – ornythion swallowtail
- Papilio palamedes leontis – Palamedes swallowtail
- Papilio pilumnus – three-tailed tiger swallowtail
- Papilio polyxenes asterius – black swallowtail
- Papilio polyxenes coloro – desert swallowtail
- Papilio rogeri pharnaces – pink-spotted swallowtail
- Papilio rogeri rogeri – pink-spotted swallowtail
- Papilio rutulus – western tiger swallowtail
- Papilio thoas autocles – Thoas swallowtail
- Papilio torquatus mazai – Torquatus swallowtail
- Papilio torquatus tolus – Torquatus swallowtail
- Papilio victorinus morelius – victorine swallowtail
- Papilio victorinus victorinus – victorine swallowtail
- Papilio zelicaon – anise swallowtail

== Pieridae ==
=== Dismorphinae ===
- Dismorphia amphione isolda – tiger mimic-white
- Dismorphia amphione lupita – tiger mimic-white
- Dismorphia amphione praxinoe – tiger mimic-white
- Dismorphia crisia alvarezi – crisia mimic-white
- Dismorphia crisia virgo – crisia mimic-white
- Dismorphia eunoe chamula – Eunoe mimic-white
- Dismorphia eunoe eunoe – Eunoe mimic-white
- Dismorphia eunoe popoluca – Eunoe mimic-white
- Dismorphia theucharila fortunata – clearwinged mimic-white
- Enantia albania albania – costa-spotted mimic-white
- Enantia jethys – Jethys mimic-white
- Enantia lina marion – white mimic-white
- Enantia lina virna – white mimic-white
- Enantia mazai diazi – De la Maza's mimic-white
- Enantia mazai mazai – De la Maza's mimic-white
- Lieinix lala lala – dark mimic-white
- Lieinix lala turrenti – dark mimic-white
- Lieinix neblina – Guerrero mimic-white
- Lieinix nemesis atthis – frosted mimic-white
- Lieinix nemesis nayaritensis – frosted mimic-white
- Pseudopieris nehemia irma – clean mimic-white

=== Coliadinae ===
- Abaeis nicippe – sleepy orange
- Anteos clorinde – white angled-sulphur
- Anteos maerula – yellow angled-sulphur
- Aphrissa boisduvalii – Boisduval's sulphur
- Aphrissa schausi – Schaus' sulphur
- Aphrissa statira statira – statira sulphur
- Colias eurytheme – orange sulphur
- Colias harfordii – Harford's sulphur
- Colias philodice eriphyle – clouded sulphur
- Colias philodice guatemalena – Guatemalan sulphur
- Eurema agave millerorum – agave yellow
- Eurema albula celata – white yellow
- Eurema boisduvaliana – Boisduval's yellow
- Eurema daira eugenia – barred yellow
- Eurema daira sidonia – barred yellow
- Eurema mexicana mexicana – Mexican yellow
- Eurema salome jamapa – Salome yellow
- Eurema xantochlora xanthochlora – tropical yellow
- Kricogonia lyside – lyside sulphur
- Nathalis iole – dainty sulphur
- Phoebis agarithe agarithe – large orange sulphur
- Phoebis agarithe fisheri – large orange sulphur
- Phoebis argante – apricot sulphur
- Phoebis neocypris virgo – tailed sulphur
- Phoebis philea philea – orange-barred sulphur
- Phoebis sennae marcellina – cloudless sulphur
- Prestonia clarki – West-Mexican sulphur
- Pyrisitia dina westwoodi – dina yellow
- Pyrisitia lisa centralis – little yellow
- Pyrisitia nise nelphe – mimosa yellow
- Pyrisitia proterpia – tailed orange
- Rhabdodryas trite – straight-lined sulphur
- Zerene cesonia cesonia – southern dogface
- Zerene eurydice – California dogface

=== Pierinae ===
==== Anthocharidini ====
- Anthocharis cethura bajacalifornia – desert orangetip
- Anthocharis cethura cethura – desert orangetip
- Anthocharis cethura pima – Pima orangetip
- Anthocharis lanceolata australis – gray marble
- Anthocharis lanceolata desertolimbus – gray marble
- Anthocharis limonea – Mexican orangetip
- Anthocharis midea texana – falcate orangetip
- Anthocharis sara sara – Sara orangetip
- Anthocharis thoosa inghami – southwestern orangetip
- Euchloe guaymasensis – Sonoran marble
- Euchloe hyantis – desert marble
- Euchloe lotta – desert marble
- Hesperocharis costaricensis pasion – Costa Rican white
- Hesperocharis crocea crocea – orange white
- Hesperocharis crocea jaliscana – orange white
- Hesperocharis graphites avivolans – marbled white
- Hesperocharis graphites graphites – marbled white

==== Pierini ====
- Archonias brassolis approximata – cattleheart white
- Ascia monuste monuste – great southern white
- Ascia monuste raza – great southern white
- Catasticta flisa flisa – narrow-banded dartwhite
- Catasticta flisa flisandra – narrow-banded dartwhite
- Catasticta flisa flisella – narrow-banded dartwhite
- Catasticta nimbice nimbice – Mexican dartwhite
- Catasticta nimbice ochracea – Mexican dartwhite
- Catasticta teutila flavifasciata – pure-banded dartwhite
- Catasticta teutila teutila – pure-banded dartwhite
- Charonias eurytele nigrescens – tiger white
- Eucheira socialis socialis – social white
- Eucheira socialis westwoodi – social white
- Ganyra howarthi – Howarth's white
- Ganyra josephina josepha – giant white
- Ganyra phaloe tiburtia – Godart's white
- Glutophrissa drusilla tenuis – Florida white
- Itaballia demophile centralis – black-banded white
- Itaballia pandiosa kicaha – brown-bordered white
- Leptophobia aripa elodia – mountain white
- Melete lycimnia isandra – creamy white
- Melete polyhymnia florinda – golden white
- Melete polyhymnia serrana – golden white
- Neophasia terlooii – Mexican pine white
- Pereute charops charops – darkened white
- Pereute charops leonilae – darkened white
- Pereute charops nigricans – darkened white
- Pereute charops sphocra – darkened white
- Perrhybris pamela chajulensis – Chiapan white
- Perrhybris pamela mapa – Chiapan white
- Pieriballia viardi viardi – viardi white
- Pieris rapae rapae – cabbage white
- Pontia beckerii – Becker's white
- Pontia protodice – checkered white
- Pontia sisymbrii sisymbrii – spring white
- Pontia sisymbrii transversa – spring white

== Lycaenidae ==
=== Miletinae ===
- Feniseca tarquinius tarquinius – harvester (expected)

=== Lycaeninae ===
- Iophanus pyrrhias – Guatemalan copper
- Lycaena arota arota – tailed copper
- Lycaena gorgon gorgon – gorgon copper
- Lycaena helloides – purplish copper
- Lycaena hermes – Hermes copper
- Lycaena xanthoides xanthoides – great copper

=== Theclinae ===
==== Theclini ====
- Habrodais grunus grunus – golden hairstreak
- Habrodais poodiae – Baja hairstreak
- Hypaurotis crysalus crysalus – Colorado hairstreak

==== Eumaeini ====
- Allosmaitia strophius – Strophius hairstreak
- Apuecla maeonis – Maeonis hairstreak
- Apuecla upupa – upupa hairstreak
- Arawacus hypocrita – pallid hairstreak
- Arawacus jada – creamy hairstreak
- Arawacus sito – fine-lined hairstreak
- Arawacus togarna – togarna hairstreak
- Arcas cypria – Mexican arcas
- Arcas imperialis – imperial arcas
- Arumecla galliena – red-based groundstreak
- Arumecla nisaee – nisaee groundstreak
- Atlides carpasia – jeweled hairstreak
- Atlides gaumeri – white-tipped hairstreak
- Atlides halesus corcorani – great blue hairstreak
- Atlides inachus – spying hairstreak
- Atlides polybe – black-veined hairstreak
- Atlides rustan – Rustan hairstreak
- Aubergina hicetas – Hicetas hairstreak
- Aubergina paetus – Paetus hairstreak
- Aubergina species – Bob's hairstreak
- Brangas carthaea – green-spotted brangas
- Brangas coccineifrons – black-veined brangas
- Brangas getus – bright brangas
- Brangas neora – common brangas
- Brevianta busa – white-scalloped hairstreak
- Brevianta tolmides – white-frosted hairstreak
- Callophrys affinis apama – Apama hairstreak
- Callophrys affinis chapmani – Apama hairstreak
- Callophrys augustinus annettae – brown elfin
- Callophrys augustinus iroides – brown elfin
- Callophrys dospassosi dospassosi – Dos Passos' hairstreak
- Callophrys dospassosi searsi – Dos Passos' hairstreak
- Callophrys eryphon eryphon – western pine elfin
- Callophrys estela – Estela hairstreak
- Callophrys gryneus "nelsoni" – Guadalupe Island juniper hairstreak
- Callophrys gryneus castalis – Texas juniper hairstreak
- Callophrys gryneus cedrosensis – Cedar Island juniper hairstreak
- Callophrys gryneus loki – Loki juniper hairstreak
- Callophrys gryneus siva – Siva juniper hairstreak
- Callophrys gryneus turkingtoni – Chihuahuan juniper hairstreak
- Callophrys guatemalena – Guatemalan hairstreak
- Callophrys henrici solatus – Henry's elfin
- Callophrys mcfarlandi – Sandia hairstreak
- Callophrys perplexa perplexa – lotus hairstreak
- Callophrys scaphia – Chiapas hairstreak
- Callophrys spinetorum millerorum – thicket hairstreak
- Callophrys spinetorum spinetorum – thicket hairstreak
- Callophrys xami texami – xami hairstreak
- Callophrys xami xami – xami hairstreak
- Calycopis atnius – atnius groundstreak
- Calycopis calus – calus groundstreak
- Calycopis cerata – cerata groundstreak
- Calycopis clarina – white-striped groundstreak
- Calycopis demonassa – shining groundstreak
- Calycopis drusilla – Drusilla groundstreak
- Calycopis isobeon – dusky-blue groundstreak
- Calycopis origo – origo groundstreak
- Calycopis pisis – Pisis groundstreak
- Calycopis tamos – Tamos hairstreak
- Calycopis trebula – Trebula groundstreak
- Calycopis xeneta – brilliant groundstreak
- Camissecla vespasianus – Vespasianus groundstreak
- Celmia celmus – celmus hairstreak
- Celmia conoveria – conoveira hairstreak
- Chalybs hassan – Hassan greenstreak
- Chalybs janias – Janias greenstreak
- Chlorostrymon simaethis sarita – silver-banded hairstreak
- Chlorostrymon telea telea – Telea hairstreak
- Contrafacia ahola – half-blue hairstreak
- Contrafacia bassania – white-etched hairstreak
- Contrafacia imma – imma hairstreak
- Cyanophrys agricolor – stained greenstreak
- Cyanophrys amyntor – Amyntor greenstreak
- Cyanophrys fusius – brown greenstreak
- Cyanophrys goodsoni – Goodson's greenstreak
- Cyanophrys herodotus – tropical greenstreak
- Cyanophrys longula – mountain greenstreak
- Cyanophrys miserablis – Clench's greenstreak
- Dicya carnica – carnica hairstreak
- Dicya dicaea – Dicaea hairstreak
- Dicya lollia – Lollia hairstreak
- Dicya lucagus – lucagus hairstreak
- Electrostrymon hugon – ruddy hairstreak
- Electrostrymon joya – muted hairstreak
- Electrostrymon mathewi – Mathew's groundstreak
- Enos falerina – Falerina hairstreak
- Enos thara – Thara hairstreak
- Erora aura – Aura hairstreak
- Erora carla – Carla hairstreak
- Erora gabina – Gabina hairstreak
- Erora muridosca – muridosca hairstreak
- Erora nitetis – Nitetis hairstreak
- Erora opisena – opisena hairstreak
- Erora quaderna – Arizona hairstreak
- Erora subflorens – emerald hairstreak
- Eumaeus childrenae – great cycadian
- Eumaeus toxea – Mexican cycadian
- Evenus batesii – Bates' hairstreak
- Evenus coronata – crowned hairstreak
- Evenus regalis – regal hairstreak
- Gargina caninius – caninus hairstreak
- Gargina gargophia – gargophia hairstreak
- Gargina gnosia – gnosia hairstreak
- Gargina thoria – thoria hairstreak
- Hypostrymon asa – Asa hairstreak
- Hypostrymon critola – Sonoran hairstreak
- Iaspis castitas – castitas hairstreak
- Iaspis temesa – Temesa hairstreak
- Iaspis species – Robert's hairstreak
- Ignata gadira – gadira hairstreak
- Ignata norax – Norax hairstreak
- Ignata species – quasigadira hairstreak
- Ipidecla miadora – West-Mexican ipidecla
- Ipidecla schausi – Schaus' ipidecla
- Janthecla janthina – janthina hairstreak
- Janthecla janthodonia – janthodonia hairstreak
- Janthecla rocena – Rocena hairstreak
- Kolana ligurina – ligurina hairstreak
- Kolana lyde – Lyde hairstreak
- Lamprospilus arza – single-banded groundstreak
- Lamprospilus collucia – two-toned groundstreak
- Lamprospilus sethon – large groundstreak
- Lamprospilus tarpa – double-banded groundstreak
- Lamprospilusspecies – Robbins' groundstreak
- Laothus barajo – barajo hairstreak
- Laothus erybathis – erybathis hairstreak
- Laothus oceia – oceia hairstreak
- Lathecla latagus – latagus hairstreak
- Lathecla species – quasilatagus hairstreak
- Magnastigma elsa – Elsa hairstreak
- Megathecla cupentus – cupenthus hairstreak
- Micandra cyda – cyda hairstreak
- Micandra tongida – tongida hairstreak
- Michaelus hecate – Hecate hairstreak
- Michaelus ira – ira hairstreak
- Michaelus jebus – variegated hairstreak
- Michaelus phoenissa – two-banded hairstreak
- Michaelus thordesa – thordesa hairstreak
- Ministrymon arola – arola ministreak
- Ministrymon azia – gray ministreak
- Ministrymon cleon – Cleon ministreak
- Ministrymon clytie – Clytie ministreak
- Ministrymon inoa – Veracruzan ministreak
- Ministrymon leda – Leda ministreak
- Ministrymon phrutus – purple-webbed ministreak
- Ministrymon una scopas – pale ministreak
- Ministrymon zilda – square-spotted ministreak
- Ministrymon species – quasileda ministreak
- Ministrymon species – Yucatán ministreak
- Mithras species – pale-patched hairstreak
- Nesiostrymon calchinia – calachinia hairstreak
- Nesiostrymon celona – Celona hairstreak
- Nesiostrymon dodava – dodava hairstreak
- Nicolaea dolium – dolium hairstreak
- Nicolaea heraldica – heraldica hairstreak
- Nicolaea ophia – ophia hairstreak
- Nicolaea velina – garnet-patched hairstreak
- Nicolaea species – Oaxacan hairstreak
- Ocaria arpoxais – blue-spotted hairstreak
- Ocaria clenchi – Clench's hairstreak
- Ocaria ocrisia – black hairstreak
- Ocaria petelina – Petelina hairstreak
- Ocaria thales – Thales blackstreak
- Ocaria species – Robbins' hairstreak
- Oenomaus atesa – atesa hairstreak
- Oenomaus ortygnus – aquamarine hairstreak
- Ostrinotes halciones – halciones hairstreak
- Ostrinotes keila – keila hairstreak
- Ostrinotes species – cryptic hairstreak
- Paiwarria antinous – Felders' hairstreak
- Paiwarria umbratus – thick-tailed hairstreak
- Panthiades bathildis – zebra-striped hairstreak
- Panthiades bitias – Bitias hairstreak
- Panthiades ochus – Ochus hairstreak
- Panthiades phaleros – Phaleros hairstreak
- Parrhasius moctezuma – Mexican-M hairstreak
- Parrhasius orgia – variable hairstreak
- Parrhasius polibetes – black-spot hairstreak
- Phaeostrymon alcestis alcestis – soapberry hairstreak
- Phaeostrymon alcestis oslari – soapberry hairstreak
- Pseudolycaena damo – sky-blue hairstreak
- Rekoa marius – Marius hairstreak
- Rekoa meton – Meton hairstreak
- Rekoa palegon – gold-bordered hairstreak
- Rekoa stagira – smudged hairstreak
- Rekoa zebina – Zebina hairstreak
- Satyrium auretorum spadix – gold-hunter's hairstreak
- Satyrium californica californica – California hairstreak
- Satyrium favonius autolycus – southern hairstreak
- Satyrium ilavia – Ilavia hairstreak
- Satyrium polingi – Poling's hairstreak
- Satyrium saepium chalcis – hedgerow hairstreak
- Satyrium sylvinus desertorum – sylvan hairstreak
- Satyrium tetra – mountain mahogany hairstreak
- Semonina semones – semones hairstreak
- Siderus leucophaeus – white-spotted hairstreak
- Siderus philinna – bold-spotted hairstreak
- Strephonota ambrax – Ambrax hairstreak
- Strephonota syedra – Syedra hairstreak
- Strephonota tephraeus – pearly-gray hairstreak
- Strymon albata – white scrub-hairsreak
- Strymon alea – Lacey's scrub-hairstreak
- Strymon astiocha – gray-spotted scrub-hairstreak
- Strymon bazochii – lantana scrub-hairstreak
- Strymon bebrycia – red-lined scrub-hairstreak
- Strymon cestri – tailless scrub-hairstreak
- Strymon gabatha – great scrub-hairstreak
- Strymon istapa clarionica – mallow scrub-hairstreak
- Strymon istapa clenchi – mallow scrub-hairstreak
- Strymon istapa istapa – mallow scrub-hairstreak
- Strymon istapa socorroica – mallow scrub-hairstreak
- Strymon megarus – Megarus scrub-hairstreak
- Strymon clarionensis – gray hairstreak
- Strymon melinus franki – gray hairstreak
- Strymon melinus pudica – gray hairstreak
- Strymon mulucha – mottled scrub-hairstreak
- Strymon rufofusca – red-crescent scrub-hairstreak
- Strymon serapio – bromeliad scrub-hairstreak
- Strymon yojoa – Yojoa scrub-hairstreak
- Strymon ziba – Ziba scrub-hairstreak
- Strymon species – puente colossal hairstreak
- Symbiopsis species – Colima hairstreak
- Temecla heraclides – Heraclides hairstreak
- Temecla paron – Paron hairstreak
- Thaeides theia – brown-barred hairstreak
- Theclopsis mycon – mycon hairstreak
- Theorema eumenia – pale-tipped cycadian
- Thepytus echelta – velvet hairstreak
- Thereus cithonius – pale-lobed hairstreak
- Thereus lausus – Lausus hairstreak
- Thereus oppia – Oppia hairstreak
- Thereus orasus – crimson-spot hairstreak
- Thereus ortalus – Ortalus hairstreak
- Theritas augustinula – augustinula hairstreak
- Theritas hemon – pale-clubbed hairstreak
- Theritas lisus – Lisus hairstreak
- Theritas mavors – deep-green hairstreak
- Theritas theocritus – pearly hairstreak
- Tmolus crolinus – crolinus hairstreak
- Tmolus cydrara – Cydrara hairstreak
- Tmolus echion echiolus – red-spotted hairstreak
- Tmolus mutina – Mutina midistreak
- Ziegleria ceromia – ceromia groundstreak
- Ziegleria denarius – coppery groundstreak
- Ziegleria guzanta – orange-crescent groundstreak
- Ziegleria hesperitis – hesperitis groundstreak
- Ziegleria hoffmani – Hoffmann's groundstreak
- Ziegleria micandriana – micandriana groundstreak
- Ziegleria syllis – sky-blue groundstreak

=== Polyommatinae ===
- Brephidium exilis exilis – western pygmy-blue
- Brephidium exilis yucateca – western pygmy-blue
- Celastrina echo subspecies – Baja azure
- Celastrina echo cinerea – southwestern azure
- Celastrina echo echo – Pacific azure
- Celastrina gozora – Mexican azure
- Cupido amyntula amyntula – western tailed-blue
- Cupido amyntula herri – western tailed-blue
- Cupido comyntas texana – eastern tailed-blue
- Echinargus huntingtoni hannoides – Huntington's blue
- Echinargus isola – Reakirt's blue
- Euphilotes bernardino bernardino – Bernardino blue
- Euphilotes bernardino garthi – Cedar Island Bernardino blue
- Euphilotes bernardino martini – Martin's Bernardino blue
- Euphilotes enoptes cryptorufes – cryptorufes dotted blue
- Euphilotes enoptes dammersi – Dammers dotted blue
- Euphilotes rita rita – Rita's blue
- Glaucopsyche lygdamus arizonensis – silvery blue
- Glaucopsyche lygdamus australis – silvery blue
- Glaucopsyche lygdamus maritima – silvery blue
- Glaucopsyche piasus umbrosa – arrowhead blue
- Hemiargus ceraunus astenidas – Ceraunus blue
- Hemiargus ceraunus gyas – Ceraunus blue
- Leptotes cassius cassidula – Cassius blue
- Leptotes marina – marine blue
- Philotes sonorensis sonorensis – Sonoran blue
- Philotiella speciosa speciosa – small blue
- Icaricia acmon – Acmon blue
- Icaricia icarioides buchholzi – Boisduval's blue
- Icaricia icarioides evius – Boisduval's blue
- Icaricia lupini monticola – monticola blue
- Icaricia lupini texanus – Texas blue
- Icaricia saepiolus hilda – greenish blue
- Plebejus melissa mexicana – Melissa blue
- Plebejus melissa paradoxa – Melissa blue
- Zizula cyna – cyna blue

== Riodinidae ==
=== Euselasiinae ===
- Euselasia argentea – orange-spotted euselasia
- Euselasia aurantiaca aurantiaca – fiery euselasia
- Euselasia aurantiaca aurum – fiery euselasia
- Euselasia cataleuca – black-edged euselasia
- Euselasia chrysippe – golden euselasia
- Euselasia eubule – dusky euselasia
- Euselasia eucrates leucorrhoa – Godman's euselasia
- Euselasia eurypus – tee-banded euselasia
- Euselasia hieronymi hieronymi – red-rayed euselasia
- Euselasia inconspicua – inconspicuous euselasia
- Euselasia mystica – mystical euselasia
- Euselasia pontasis – pontasis euselasia
- Euselasia procula – orange-costa euselasia
- Euselasia pusilla mazai – pearly euselasia
- Euselasia pusilla pusilla – pearly euselasia
- Euselasia regipennis regipennis – purple-topped euselasia
- Euselasia sergia sergia – Sergia euselasia
- Hades noctula – white-rayed metalmark

=== Riodininae ===
- Adelotypa eudocia – tiny metalmark
- Ancyluris inca inca – Inca metalmark
- Ancyluris jurgensenii jurgensenii – costa-spotted metalmark
- Anteros carausius – carousing anteros
- Anteros chrysoprasta roratus – elegant anteros
- Anteros formosus micon – black-bellied anteros
- Apodemia chisosensis – Chisos metalmark
- Apodemia duryi – Dury's metalmark
- Apodemia hepburni hepburni – Hepburn's metalmark
- Apodemia hepburni remota – Hepburn's metalmark
- Apodemia hypoglauca hypoglauca – falcate metalmark
- Apodemia hypoglauca wellingi – falcate metalmark
- Apodemia mejicanus deserti – desert Mexican metalmark
- Apodemia mejicanus maxima – giant Mexican metalmark
- Apodemia mejicanus mejicanus – Mexican metalmark
- Apodemia multiplaga – narrow-winged metalmark
- Apodemia murphyi – Murphy's metalmark
- Apodemia nais – nais metalmark
- Apodemia palmerii arizona – Palmer's metalmark
- Apodemia palmerii australis – Palmer's metalmark
- Apodemia palmerii palmerii – Palmer's metalmark
- Apodemia phyciodoides – crescent metalmark
- Apodemia virgulti dialeuca – Baja metalmark
- Apodemia virgulti peninsularis – peninsular metalmark
- Apodemia virgulti virgulti – Behr's metalmark
- Apodemia walkeri – Walker's metalmark
- Argyrogrammana stilbe holosticta – dotted metalmark
- Baeotis barce barce – Barce metalmark
- Baeotis sulphurea macularia – sulphur metalmark
- Baeotis sulphurea sulphurea – sulphur metalmark
- Baeotis zonata zonata – bumblebee metalmark
- Behemothia godmanii – Godman's metalmark
- Brachyglenis dodone – orange-bellied metalmark
- Calephelis acapulcoensis – Acapulco calephelis
- Calephelis argyrodines – argyrodines calephelis
- Calephelis arizonensis – Arizona calephelis
- Calephelis azteca – Aztec calephelis
- Calephelis bajaensis – Baja calephelis
- Calephelis browni – Brown's calephelis
- Calephelis costaricicola – Costa Rican calephelis
- Calephelis dreisbachi – Dreisbach's calephelis
- Calephelis freemani – Freeman's calephelis
- Calephelis fulmen – fulmen calephelis
- Calephelis huasteca – Huastecan calephelis
- Calephelis laverna laverna – Laverna calephelis
- Calephelis matheri – Mather's calephelis
- Calephelis maya – Mayan calephelis
- Calephelis mexicana – Mexican calephelis
- Calephelis montezuma – Montezuma's calephelis
- Calephelis nemesis australis – fatal calephelis
- Calephelis nemesis dammersi – fatal calephelis
- Calephelis nemesis nemesis – fatal calephelis
- Calephelis perditalis donahuei – rounded calephelis
- Calephelis perditalis perditalis – rounded calephelis
- Calephelis rawsoni – Rawson's calephelis
- Calephelis sacapulas – Sacapulas calephelis
- Calephelis sinaloensis nuevoleon – Sinaloan calephelis
- Calephelis sinaloensis sinaloensis – Sinaloan calephelis
- Calephelis sixola – greater calephelis
- Calephelis stallingsi – Stallings' calephelis
- Calephelis tikal – Tikal calephelis
- Calephelis velutina – dark calephelis
- Calephelis wellingi – Welling's calephelis
- Calephelis wrighti – Wright's calephelis
- Calephelis yautepequensis – Morelos calephelis
- Calephelis yucatana – Yucatán calephelis
- Calicosama lilina – white-posted metalmark
- Calociasma nycteus – brown-and-white metalmark
- Calospila pelarge – Pelarge metalmark
- Calydna sturnula – sturnula metalmark
- Calydna venusta venusta – venusta metalmark
- Caria domitianus vejento – small-patched metalmark
- Caria ino ino – red-bordered metalmark
- Caria ino melicerta – red-bordered metalmark
- Caria mantinea lampeto – Lampeto metalmark
- Caria melino – Melino metalmark
- Caria rhacotis – Honduran metalmark
- Caria stillaticia – gold-headed metalmark
- Chalodeta chaonitis – orange-stitched metalmark
- Chamaelimnas cydonia – Cydonia metalmark
- Chimastrum argentea argentea – silvery metalmark
- Cremna actoris – actoris metalmark
- Cremna thasus subrutila – Thasus metalmark
- Emesia cypria paphia – orange-striped emesis
- Emesis ares – Ares emesis
- Emesis arnacis – Miahuatlan emesis
- Emesis aurimna – white-spotted emesis
- Emesis emesia – curve-winged emesis
- Emesis fatimella nobilata – fatimella emesis
- Emesis liodes – liodes emesis
- Emesis lupina lupina – lupina emesis
- Emesis mandana furor – great emesis
- Emesis ocypore aethalia – dark emesis
- Emesis poeas – thorn-scrub emesis
- Emesis saturata – Oaxacan emesis
- Emesis tegula – tegula emesis
- Emesis tenedia – falcate emesis
- Emesis toltec – Toltec emesis
- Emesis vimena – Schaus' emesis
- Emesis vulpina – pale emesis
- Emesis zela cleis – Zela emesis
- Emesis zela zela – Zela emesis
- Esthemopsis alicia alicia – Alicia's metalmark
- Esthemopsis clonia – Clonia metalmark
- Esthemopsis pherephatte perephatte – Godart's metalmark
- Eurybia elvina elvina – blind eurybia
- Eurybia lycisca – blue-winged eurybia
- Eurybia patrona persona – great eurybia
- Exoplisia azuleja – occidental metalmark
- Exoplisia hypochalybe hypochalybe – many-banded metalmark
- Hermathena oweni – white metalmark
- Hypophylla sudias sudias – white-banded metalmark
- Hypophylla zeurippa – zeurippa metalmark
- Isapis agyrtus hera – yellow-based metalmark
- Juditha caucana – Caucana metalmark
- Lamphiotes velazquezi – brown-tipped metalmark
- Lasaia agesilas callaina – shining-blue lasaia
- Lasaia maria anna – blue-gray lasaia
- Lasaia maria maria – blue-gray lasaia
- Lasaia meris – variegated lasaia
- Lasaia sessilis – gray lasaia
- Lasaia sula peninsularis – blue lasaia
- Lasaia sula sula – blue lasaia
- Lemonias caliginea – Butler's metalmark
- Leucochimona lepida nivalis – satyr metalmark
- Leucochimona vestalis vestalis – Vestalis metalmark
- Lyropteryx lyra cleadas – lyra metalmark
- Melanis acroleuca acroleuca – white-rayed metalmark
- Melanis acroleuca huasteca – white-tipped metalmark
- Melanis cephise – white-tipped metalmark
- Melanis pixe pixe – pixie
- Menander menander purpurata – Menander metalmark
- Menander pretus picta – Cramer's metalmark
- Mesene croceella – Guatemalan metalmark
- Mesene leucopus – white-legged metalmark
- Mesene margaretta margaretta – zebra-tipped metalmark
- Mesene oriens – Oriens metalmark
- Mesene phareus – cell-barred metalmark
- Mesene silaris – yellow metalmark
- Mesosemia gaudiolum – gaudy eyed-metalmark
- Mesosemia gemina – turquoise eyed-metalmark
- Mesosemia lamachus – purple-washed eyed-metalmark
- Napaea eucharila picina – white-stitched metalmark
- Napaea theages theages – white-spotted metalmark
- Necyria larunda – Duellona metalmark
- Notheme erota diadema – tawny metalmark
- Nymphidium ascolia ascolia – creamy metalmark
- Nymphidium onaeum – Hewitson's metalmark
- Pachythone gigas gigas – Gigas metalmark
- Panaropsis elegans – fire-banded metalmark
- Periplacis glaucoma isthmica – glaucoma metalmark
- Perophthalma lasus – Lasus metalmark
- Pheles eulesca – Dyar's metalmark
- Pheles melanchroia – melancholy metalmark
- Pheles strigosa strigosa – strigosa metalmark
- Pirascca tyriotes – golden-banded metalmark
- Pseudonymphidia agave agave – agave metalmark
- Pseudonymphidia clearista – clearista metalmark
- Rhetus arcius beutelspacheri – long-tailed metalmark
- Rhetus arcius thia – long-tailed metalmark
- Rhetus periander naevianus – Periander metalmark
- Sarota chrysus – Stoll's sarota
- Sarota craspediodonta – Veracruzan sarota
- Sarota estrada estrada – Schaus' sarota
- Sarota gamelia gamelia – Panamanian sarota
- Sarota gyas – Guyanese sarota
- Sarota myrtea – Godman's sarota
- Sarota psaros psaros – Guatemalan sarota
- Setabis lagus jansoni – northern setabis
- Symmachia accusatrix – accused metalmark
- Symmachia probetor championi – Champion's metalmark
- Symmachia rubina rubina – Rubina metalmark
- Symmachia triclor – tricolored metalmark
- Synargis mycone – rusty metalmark
- Synargis nymphidioides septentrionalis – greater metalmark
- Synargis ochra – ochra metalmark
- Theope bacenis – curve-lined theope
- Theope barea – Panamanian theope
- Theope cratylus – scallop-patched theope
- Theope devriesi – DeVries' theope
- Theope eupolis – Veracruzan theope
- Theope pedias – yellow-bottomed theope
- Theope phaeo – falcate theope
- Theope pieridoides – white theope
- Theope pseudopedias – Hall's theope
- Theope publius incompositus – shaded theope
- Theope villai – West-Mexican theope
- Theope virgilius – blue-based theope
- Thisbe irenea belides – Irenia metalmark
- Thisbe lycorias lycorias – banner metalmark
- Voltinia danforthi – ancient metalmark
- Voltinia umbra – quilted metalmark

== Nymphalidae ==
=== Libytheinae ===
- Libytheana carinenta larvata – American snout
- Libytheana carinenta mexicana – American snout
- Libytheana carinenta streckeri – American snout

=== Danainae ===
==== Danaini ====
- Anetia thirza thirza – cloud-forest king
- Danaus eresimus montezuma – soldier
- Danaus gilippus thersippus – queen
- Danaus plexippus plexippus – monarch
- Lycorea halia atergatis – tiger mimic-queen
- Lycorea ilione albescens – clearwing mimic-queen

==== Ithomiini ====
- Aeria eurimedia pacifica – Pacific tigerwing
- Callithomia hezia hedila – hezia clearwing
- Callithomia hezia wellingi – hezia clearwing
- Ceratinia tutia – tutia clearwing
- Dircenna dero – dero clearwing
- Dircenna jemina – Jemina clearwing
- Dircenna klugii – Klug's clearwing
- Episcada salvinia portilla – rusted Salvin's clearwing
- Episcada salvinia salvinia – Salvin's clearwing
- Godyris nero – Nero clearwing
- Godyris zavaleta sosunga – variegated clearwing
- Greta andromica lyra – lyra clearwing
- Greta annette annette – white-spotted clearwing
- Greta annette moschion – rusted white-spotted clearwing
- Greta morgane morgane – rusty clearwing
- Greta morgane oto – darkened rusty clearwing
- Hypoleria lavinia cassotis – Cassotis clearwing
- Hyposcada virginiana virginiana – Virginiana clearwing
- Hypothyris euclea valora – euclea tigerwing
- Hypothyris lycaste dionaea – Lycaste tigerwing
- Ithomia leila – Leila's clearwing
- Ithomia patilla – Patilla clearwing
- Mechanitis lysimnia utemaia – lysimnia tigerwing
- Mechanitis menapis doryssus – menapis tigerwing
- Mechanitis polymnia lycidice – Polymnia tigerwing
- Melinaea lilis flavicans – mimic tigerwing
- Melinaea lilis imitata – mimic tigerwing
- Napeogenes tolosa tolosa – Tolosa tigerwing
- Oleria paula – Paula's clearwing
- Oleria zea diazi – rusted zea clearwing
- Oleria zea zea – zea clearwing
- Olyras theon – rusty tigerwing
- Pteronymia alcmena – Alcmena clearwing
- Pteronymia artena artena – Artena clearwing
- Pteronymia artena praedicta – rusted Artena clearwing
- Pteronymia cotytto – Cotytto clearwing
- Pteronymia parva – parva clearwing
- Pteronymia rufocincta – West-Mexican clearwing
- Pteronymia simplex fenochioi – simple clearwing
- Pteronymia simplex timagenes – simple clearwing
- Pteronymia species – Lamas' clearwing
- Thyridia psidii melantho – Melantho tigerwing
- Tithorea harmonia hippothous – Harmonia tigerwing
- Tithorea harmonia salvadoris – Harmonia tigerwing
- Tithorea tarricina duenna – cream-spotted tigerwing

=== Limenitidinae ===
- Adelpha barnesia leucas – Leucas sister
- Adelpha basiloides – spot-celled sister
- Adelpha boeotia oberthurii – Oberthur's sister
- Adelpha bredowii – Mexican sister
- Adelpha californica – California sister
- Adelpha cocala lorzae – Lorza's sister
- Adelpha cytherea marcia – Marcia sister
- Adelpha delinita utina – Utina sister
- Adelpha diazi – Diaz's sister
- Adelpha diocles creton – short-tailed sister
- Adelpha donysa donysa – Donysa sister
- Adelpha erotia erotia – Lerna sister
- Adelpha erymanthis esperanza – Esperanza sister
- Adelpha ethelda – Ethelda sister
- Adelpha eulalia – Arizona sister
- Adelpha felderi – Felder's sister
- Adelpha fessonia fessonia – band-celled sister
- Adelpha iphicleola iphicleola – iphicleola sister
- Adelpha iphiclus iphiclus – Iphiclus sister
- Adelpha leuceria leuceria – yellow-striped sister
- Adelpha leucerioides leucerioides – tawny-striped sister
- Adelpha lycorias melanthe – rayed sister
- Adelpha malea fundania – Fundania sister
- Adelpha milleri – Miller's sister
- Adelpha naxia naxia – Naxia sister
- Adelpha nea sentia – Sentia sister
- Adelpha paraena massilia – Massilia sister
- Adelpha paroeca paroeca – paroeca sister
- Adelpha phylaca phylaca – phylaca sister
- Adelpha pithys – pithy sister
- Adelpha salmoneus salmonides – golden-banded sister
- Adelpha salus – Salus sister
- Adelpha seriphia godmani – Godman's sister
- Adelpha serpa celerio – celerio sister
- Limenitis archippus hoffmanni – viceroy
- Limenitis archippus obsoleta – viceroy
- Limenitis arthemis arizonensis – Arizona red-spotted purple
- Limenitis lorquini powelli – Lorquin's admiral
- Limenitis weidemeyerii siennafascia – Weidemeyer's admiral

=== Heliconiinae ===
==== Acraeini ====
- Actinote anteas – anteas actinote
- Actinote guatemalena guatemalena – Guatemalan actinote
- Actinote guatemalena guerrerensis – Guatemalan actinote
- Actinote guatemalena veraecrucis – Guatemalan actinote
- Actinote lapitha calderoni – pale actinote
- Actinote lapitha lapitha – pale actinote
- Actinote melampeplos melampeplos – bow-winged actinote
- Altinote ozomene nox – lamplight actinote
- Altinote stratonice oaxaca – orange-disked actinote

==== Heliconiini ====
- Agraulis vanillae incarnata – Gulf fritillary
- Dione juno huascuma – Juno longwing
- Dione moneta poeyii – Mexican silverspot
- Dryadula phaetusa – banded longwing
- Dryas iulia moderata – Julia
- Eueides aliphera gracilis – Aliphera longwing
- Eueides isabella eva – Isabella's longwing
- Eueides isabella nigricornis – Isabella's longwing
- Eueides lineata – thick-edged longwing
- Eueides procula asidia – Procula longwing
- Eueides vibilia vialis – vibilia longwing
- Heliconius charithonia vazquezae – zebra longwing
- Heliconius cydno galanthus – cydno longwing
- Heliconius doris viridis – Doris longwing
- Heliconius erato cruentus – crimson-patched longwing
- Heliconius erato petiverana – crimson-patched longwing
- Heliconius hecale fornarina – Hecale longwing
- Heliconius hecale zuleika – Hecale longwing
- Heliconius hecalesia octavia – five-spotted longwing
- Heliconius hortense – Mexican longwing
- Heliconius ismenius telchinia – tiger-striped longwing
- Heliconius sapho leuce – Sapho longwing
- Heliconius sara veraepacis – Sara longwing
- Philaethria diatonica – northern green longwing

==== Argynnini ====
- Euptoieta claudia – variegated fritillary
- Euptoieta hegesia meridiania – Mexican fritillary
- Speyeria callippe comstocki – callippe fritillary
- Speyeria coronis semiramis – Coronis fritillary
- Speyeria nokomis coerulescens – Nokomis fritillary
- Speyeria nokomis melaena – Nokomis fritillary
- Speyeria nokomis wenona – Nokomis fritillary

=== Apaturinae ===
- Asterocampa celtis antonia – hackberry emperor
- Asterocampa clyton louisa – tawny emperor
- Asterocampa clyton texana – tawny emperor
- Asterocampa idyja argus – cream-banded dusky emperor
- Asterocampa leilia – Empress Leilia
- Doxocopa callianira – Nicaraguan emperor
- Doxocopa cyane mexicana – Mexican emperor
- Doxocopa laure laure – silver emperor
- Doxocopa laurentia cherubina – turquoise emperor
- Doxocopa pavon theodora – pavon emperor

=== Biblidinae ===
==== Biblidini ====
- Biblis hyperia aganisa – red rim

==== Eurytelini ====
- Mestra amymone – northern mestra

==== Catonephelini ====
- Catonephele cortesi – West-Mexican banner
- Catonephele mexicana – East-Mexican banner
- Catonephele numilia esite – blue-frosted banner
- Catonephele numilia immaculata – blue-frosted banner
- Eunica alcmena alcmena – dark purplewing
- Eunica alpais excelsa – shining purplewing
- Eunica caelina agusta – mottled purplewing
- Eunica caelina agustina – mottled purplewing
- Eunica malvina albida – rayed purplewing
- Eunica malvina almae – rayed purplewing
- Eunica monima – dingy purplewing
- Eunica mygdonia omoa – blind purplewing
- Eunica sydonia caresa – plain purplewing
- Eunica tatila tatila – Florida purplewing
- Eunica volumna venusia – blue-celled purplewing
- Myscelia cyananthe cyananthe – blackened bluewing
- Myscelia cyananthe diaziana – blackened bluewing
- Myscelia cyananthe skinneri – blackened bluewing
- Myscelia cyananthe streckeri – blackened bluewing
- Myscelia cyaniris alvaradia – whitened bluewing
- Myscelia cyaniris cyaniris – whitened bluewing
- Myscelia ethusa chiapensis – Mexican bluewing
- Myscelia ethusa cyanecula – Mexican bluewing
- Myscelia ethusa ethusa – Mexican bluewing
- Nessaea aglaura aglaura – northern nessaea

==== Ageroniini ====
- Ectima erycinoides – northern ectima
- Hamadryas amphinome mazai – red cracker
- Hamadryas amphinome mexicana – red cracker
- Hamadryas atlantis atlantis – black-patched cracker
- Hamadryas atlantis lelaps – black-patched cracker
- Hamadryas februa ferentina – gray cracker
- Hamadryas feronia farinulenta – variable cracker
- Hamadryas fornax fornacalia – orange cracker
- Hamadryas glauconome glauconome – glaucous cracker
- Hamadryas glauconome grisea – glaucous cracker
- Hamadryas guatemalena guatemalena – Guatemalan cracker
- Hamadryas guatemalena marmarice – Guatemalan cracker
- Hamadryas iphthime joannae – brownish cracker
- Hamadryas julitta – Yucatán cracker
- Hamadryas laodamia saurites – starry cracker

==== Epiphelini ====
- Bolboneura sylphis beatrix – variable banner
- Bolboneura sylphis lacandona – variable banner
- Bolboneura sylphis sylphis – variable banner
- Bolboneura sylphis veracruzana – variable banner
- Epiphile adrasta adrasta – common banner
- Epiphile adrasta escalantei – common banner
- Epiphile hermosa – beautiful banner
- Epiphile iblis plutonia – plutonia banner
- Nica flavilla bachiana – little banner
- Pyrrhogyra edocla edocla – green-spotted banner
- Pyrrhogyra edocla paradisea – green-spotted banner
- Pyrrhogyra neaerea hypsenor – banded banner
- Pyrrhogyra otolais otolais – double-banded banner
- Temenis laothoe hondurensis – orange banner
- Temenis laothoe quilapayunia – orange banner

==== Eubagini ====
- Dynamine artemisia – small-eyed sailor
- Dynamine ate – little sailor
- Dynamine dyonis – blue-eyed sailor
- Dynamine postverta mexicana – Mexican sailor
- Dynamine theseus – white sailor

==== Callicorini ====
- Callicore astarte casta – blue-stitched eighty-eight
- Callicore astarte patelina – blue-stitched eighty-eight
- Callicore lyca lyca – six-spotted eighty-eight
- Callicore pitheas – two-eyed eighty-eight
- Callicore texa heroica – yellow-rimmed eighty-eight
- Callicore texa loxicha – yellow-rimmed eighty-eight
- Callicore texa tacana – yellow-rimmed eighty-eight
- Callicore texa titania – yellow-rimmed eighty-eight
- Callicore tolima guatemalena – blue-and-orange eighty-eight
- Callicore tolima pacifica – blue-and-orange eighty-eight
- Callicore tolima tehuana – blue-and-orange eighty-eight
- Diaethria anna anna – Anna's eighty-eight
- Diaethria anna mixteca – Anna's eighty-eight
- Diaethria anna salvadorensis – Anna's eighty-eight
- Diaethria astala astala – Astala eighty-eight
- Diaethria astala asteroide – Astala eighty-eight
- Diaethria asteria – West-Mexican eighty-eight
- Diaethria bacchis – white-patched eighty-eight
- Diaethria pandama – orange-striped eighty-eight

=== Nymphalinae ===
==== Incertae sedis ====
- Pycina zamba zelys – cloud-forest beauty

==== Cyrestini ====
- Marpesia chiron marius – many-banded daggerwing
- Marpesia corita corita – orange-banded daggerwing
- Marpesia corita phiale – orange-banded daggerwing
- Marpesia harmonia – pale daggerwing
- Marpesia petreus – ruddy daggerwing
- Marpesia zerynthia dentigera – waiter daggerwing

==== Coeini ====
- Baeotus beotus – graphic beauty
- Historis acheronta acheronta – tailed cecropian
- Historis odius dious – Orion cecropian

==== Nymphalini ====
- Aglais milberti subpallida – Milbert's tortoiseshell
- Colobura annulata – new beauty
- Colobura dirce dirce – Dirce beauty
- Hypanartia dione disjuncta – banded mapwing
- Hypanartia godmanii – Godman's mapwing
- Hypanartia lethe – orange mapwing
- Hypanartia trimaculata autumna – reddish mapwing
- Nymphalis antiopa antiopa – mourning coak
- Nymphalis californica – California tortoiseshell
- Nymphalis cyanomelas – Mexican tortoiseshell
- Polygonia g-argenteum – Mexican anglewing
- Polygonia gracilis zephyrus – zephyr anglewing
- Polygonia haroldii – spotless anglewing
- Polygonia interrogationis – question mark
- Polygonia satyrus satyrus – satyr anglewing
- Smyrna blomfildia datis – Blomfild's beauty
- Smyrna karwinskii – Karwinski's beauty
- Tigridia acesta – tiger beauty
- Vanessa annabella – West Coast lady
- Vanessa atalanta rubria – red admiral
- Vanessa cardui – painted lady
- Vanessa virginiensis – American lady

==== Victorinini ====
- Anartia fatima colima – banded peacock
- Anartia fatima fatima – banded peacock
- Anartia jatrophae luteipicta – white peacock
- Siproeta epaphus epaphus – rusty-tipped page
- Siproeta stelenes biplagiata – malachite
- Siproeta superba superba – broad-banded page

==== Junoniini ====
- Hypolimnas misippus – mimic
- Junonia coenia coenia – northern buckeye
- Junonia coenia grisea – northern buckeye
- Junonia evarete nigrosuffusa – dark buckeye
- Junonia genoveva – mangrove buckeye

==== Melitaeini ====
- Anthanassa ardys ardys – Ardys crescent
- Anthanassa ardys subota – Ardys crescent
- Anthanassa argentea – chestnut crescent
- Anthanassa atronia – brown crescent
- Anthanassa dracaena phlegias – notched crescent
- Anthanassa drusilla lelex – orange-patched crescent
- Anthanassa drymaea – weak-banded crescent
- Anthanassa nebulosa alexon – Alexon crescent
- Anthanassa nebulosa nebulosa – nebulosa crescent
- Anthanassa otanes cyno – blackened crescent
- Anthanassa otanes oaxaca – blackened crescent
- Anthanassa otanes otanes – blackened crescent
- Anthanassa ptolyca amator – darkened crescent
- Anthanassa ptolyca ptolyca – darkened crescent
- Anthanassa sitalces cortes – montane crescent
- Anthanassa sitalces sitalces – montane crescent
- Anthanassa texana texana – Texan crescent
- Anthanassa tulcis – pale-banded crescent
- Castilia chiapaensis – Chiapas crescent
- Castilia chinantlensis – Chinantlan crescent
- Castilia eranites – mimic crescent
- Castilia griseobasalis – gray-based crescent
- Castilia myia – Mayan crescent
- Castilia ofella – white-dotted crescent
- Chlosyne acastus sabina – sagebrush checkerspot
- Chlosyne californica – California patch
- Chlosyne cyneas – Cyneas checkerspot
- Chlosyne cynisca – Oaxacan checkerspot
- Chlosyne definita anastasia – definite checkerspot
- Chlosyne definita definita – definite checkerspot
- Chlosyne ehrenbergii – white-rayed checkerspot
- Chlosyne endeis endeis – banded checkerspot
- Chlosyne endeis pardelina – banded checkerspot
- Chlosyne erodyle erodyle – erodyle checkerspot
- Chlosyne eumeda – Eumeda checkerspot
- Chlosyne fulvia coronado – Fulvia checkerspot
- Chlosyne fulvia fulvia – Fulvia checkerspot
- Chlosyne gabbii gabbii – Gabb's checkerspot
- Chlosyne gaudialis gaudialis – gaudy checkerspot
- Chlosyne gaudialis wellingi – Welling's gaudy checkerspot
- Chlosyne hippodrome hippodrome – simple checkerspot
- Chlosyne janais gloriosa – glorious checkerspot
- Chlosyne janais janais – crimson-patch checkerspot
- Chlosyne janais marianna – crimson-patch checkerspot
- Chlosyne kendallorum – Kendall's checkerspot
- Chlosyne lacinia adjutrix – bordered patch
- Chlosyne lacinia crocale – bordered patch
- Chlosyne lacinia lacinia – bordered patch
- Chlosyne leanira austrima – Leanira checkerspot
- Chlosyne leanira wrightii – Leanira checkerspot
- Chlosyne marina – marina checkerspot
- Chlosyne melanarge – black checkerspot
- Chlosyne melitaeoides – melitaeoides checkerspot
- Chlosyne rosita browni – Rosita checkerspot
- Chlosyne rosita mazarum – Rosita checkerspot
- Chlosyne rosita montana – Rosita checkerspot
- Chlosyne rosita riobalsensis – Rosita checkerspot
- Chlosyne rosita rosita – Rosita checkerspot
- Chlosyne theona bollii – Theona checkerspot
- Chlosyne theona brocki – Theona checkerspot
- Chlosyne theona chinatiensis – Theona checkerspot
- Chlosyne theona minimus – Theona checkerspot
- Chlosyne theona mullinsi – Theona checkerspot
- Chlosyne theona thekla – Theona checkerspot
- Chlosyne theona theona – Theona checkerspot
- Dymasia dymas chara – tiny checkerspot
- Dymasia dymas dymas – tiny checkerspot
- Dymasia dymas imperialis – tiny checkerspot
- Eresia clio clio – Clio crescent
- Eresia phillyra phillyra – longwing crescent
- Euphydryas anicia hermosa – Anicia checkerspot
- Euphydryas chalcedona chalcedona – Chalcedon checkerspot
- Euphydryas chalcedona hennei – Chalcedon checkerspot
- Euphydryas editha quino – Edith's checkerspot, Quino checkerspot
- Microtia elva elva – elf
- Microtia elva horni – elf
- Phyciodes graphica – Vesta crescent
- Phyciodes mylitta arizonensis – Mylitta crescent
- Phyciodes mylitta mexicana – Mylitta crescent
- Phyciodes mylitta mylitta – Mylitta crescent
- Phyciodes mylitta thebais – Mylitta crescent
- Phyciodes pallescens – Mexican crescent
- Phyciodes phaon jalapeno – Phaon crescent
- Phyciodes phaon maya – Phaon crescent
- Phyciodes phaon phaon – Phaon crescent
- Phyciodes picta canace – painted crescent
- Phyciodes tharos tharos – pearl crescent
- Poladryas arachne nympha – Arachne checkerspot
- Poladryas minuta minuta – dotted checkerspot
- Tegosa anieta cluvia – black-bordered crescent
- Tegosa anieta luka – black-bordered crescent
- Tegosa claudina – Claudina crescent
- Tegosa guatemalena – Guatemalan crescent
- Tegosa nigrella nigrella – nigrella crescent
- Texola anomalus – anomalus checkerspot
- Texola coracara – coracara checkerspot
- Texola elada elada – Elada checkerspot
- Texola elada hepburni – Elada checkerspot
- Texola elada ulrica – Elada checkerspot
- Texola perse – Arizona checkerspot

=== Charaxinae ===
==== Anaeini ====
- Anaea aidea – tropical leafwing
- Anaea andria – goatweed leafwing
- Consul electra adustus – pearly leafwing
- Consul electra electra – pearly leafwing
- Consul excellens excellens – black-veined leafwing
- Consul excellens genini – black-veined leafwing
- Consul fabius cecrops – tiger-striped leafwing
- Fountainea eurypyle confusa – pointed leafwing
- Fountainea eurypyle glanzi – pointed leafwing
- Fountainea glycerium glycerium – angled leafwing
- Fountainea glycerium yucatanum – angled leafwing
- Fountainea halice martinezi – thorn-scrub leafwing
- Fountainea halice maya – Yucatán thorn-scrub leafwing
- Fountainea halice tehuana – West-Mexican thorn-scrub leafwing
- Fountainea nobilis nobilis – noble leafwing
- Fountainea nobilis rayoensis – noble leafwing
- Fountainea ryphea ryphea – ryphea leafwing
- Hypna clytemnestra mexicana – silver-studded leafwing
- Memphis arginussa eubaena – mottled leafwing
- Memphis artacaena – white-patched leafwing
- Memphis aureola – aureola leafwing
- Memphis dia dia – Dia leafwing
- Memphis forreri – Forrer's leafwing
- Memphis hedemanni – Hedemann's leafwing
- Memphis herbacea – herbacea leafwing
- Memphis mora orthesia – orthesia leafwing
- Memphis moruus boisduvali – Boisduval's leafwing
- Memphis neidhoeferi – wavy-edged leafwing
- Memphis oenomais – edge leafwing
- Memphis perenna perenna – Perenna leafwing
- Memphis philumena xenica – orange-striped leafwing
- Memphis pithyusa pithyusa – pale-spotted leafwing
- Memphis proserpina proserpina – Proserpina leafwing
- Memphis schausiana – great leafwing
- Memphis wellingi – Welling's leafwing
- Memphis xenocles carolina – Carolina leafwing
- Siderone galanthis – red-striped leafwing
- Siderone syntyche syntyche – red-patched leafwing
- Zaretis callidryas – pale leafwing
- Zaretis ellops – seasonal leafwing
- Zaretis isidora – Isidora leafwing
- Zaretis itys itys – Itys leafwing

==== Preponini ====
- Agrias aedon rodriguezi – great agrias
- Agrias amydon lacandona – white-spotted agrias
- Agrias amydon oaxacata – white-spotted agrias
- Archaeoprepona amphimachus amphiktion – white-spotted prepona
- Archaeoprepona amphimachus baroni – white-spotted prepona
- Archaeoprepona demophon centralis – one-spotted prepona
- Archaeoprepona demophon occidentalis – one-spotted prepona
- Archaeoprepona demophoon gulina – two-spotted prepona
- Archaeoprepona demophoon mexicana – two-spotted prepona
- Archaeoprepona meander phoebus – three-toned prepona
- Archaeoprepona phaedra aelia – falcate prepona
- Prepona deiphile brooksiana – orange-spotted prepona
- Prepona deiphile diaziana – orange-spotted prepona
- Prepona deiphile escalantiana – orange-spotted prepona
- Prepona deiphile ibarra – orange-spotted prepona
- Prepona deiphile lambertoana – orange-spotted prepona
- Prepona dexamenus medinai – least prepona
- Prepona laertes octavia – yellow-tufted prepona
- Prepona pylene philetas – mottled prepona

=== Morphinae ===
==== Morphini ====
- Antirrhea philoctetes casta – northern antirrhea
- Morpho helenor montezuma – common morpho
- Morpho helenor octavia – common morpho
- Morpho helenor guerrerensis – common morpho
- Morpho polyphemus polyphemus – white morpho
- Morpho polyphemus luna – white morpho
- Morpho theseus justitiae – stub-tailed morpho
- Morpho theseus oaxacensis – stub-tailed morpho
- Morpho theseus schweizeri – stub-tailed morpho

==== Brassolini ====
- Caligo brasiliensis sulanus – sulanus owl-butterfly
- Caligo oedipus fruhstorferi – Fruhstorfer's owl-butterfly
- Caligo telamonius memmon – pale owl-butterfly
- Caligo uranus – gold-edged owl-butterfly
- Dynastor darius stygianus – daring owl-butterfly
- Dynastor macrosiris strix – green-eyed owl-butterfly
- Eryphanis aesacus aesacus – double-spotted owl-butterfly
- Mielkella singularis – singular owl-butterfly
- Mimoblepia staudingeri mexicana – Staudinger's owl-butterfly
- Narope minor – small owl-butterfly
- Narope testacea – brown owl-butterfly
- Opsiphanes blythekitzmillerae – Minerva's owl-butterfly
- Opsiphanes boisduvallii – orange owl-butterfly
- Opsiphanes cassiae mexicana – Cassia's owl-butterfly
- Opsiphanes cassina fabricii – split-banded owl-butterfly
- Opsiphanes invirae relucens – lowland owl-butterfly
- Opsiphanes quiteria quirinus – scalloped owl-butterfly
- Opsiphanes tamarindi tamarindi – narrow-banded owl-butterfly

=== Satyrinae ===
- Cepheuptychia glaucina – dirty-blue satyr
- Cercyonis meadii damei – Mead's wood-nymph
- Cercyonis meadii melania – Mead's wood-nymph
- Cercyonis pegala texana – common wood-nymph
- Cercyonis sthenele behrii – Great Basin wood-nymph
- Chloreuptychia sericeella – blue-topped satyr
- Cissia cleophes – Cleophes satyr
- Cissia confusa – confused satyr
- Cissia labe – Labe satyr
- Cissia palladia – Butler's satyr
- Cissia pompilia – plain satyr
- Cissia pseudoconfusa – gold-stained satyr
- Cissia similis – one-pupil satyr
- Cissia terrestris – terrestrial satyr
- Cissia themis – two-pupil satyr
- Coenonympha tullia california – California ringlet
- Cyllopsis caballeroi – cowboy gemmed-satyr
- Cyllopsis clinas – falcate gemmed-satyr
- Cyllopsis diazi – Diaz's gemmed-satyr
- Cyllopsis dospassosi – dos Passos' gemmed-satyr
- Cyllopsis gemma freemani – Freeman's gemmed-satyr
- Cyllopsis guatemalena – Guatemalan gemmed-satyr
- Cyllopsis hedemanni hedemanni – stub-tailed gemmed-satyr
- Cyllopsis hedemanni tamaulipensis – stub-tailed gemmed-satyr
- Cyllopsis hilaria – two-toned gemmed-satyr
- Cyllopsis jacquelineae – Jacqueline's gemmed-satyr
- Cyllopsis nayarit – Nayarit gemmed-satyr
- Cyllopsis pallens – pallid gemmed-satyr
- Cyllopsis parvimaculata – weak-marked gemmed-satyr
- Cyllopsis pephredo – big-spiked gemmed-satyr
- Cyllopsis perplexa – perplexing gemmed-satyr
- Cyllopsis pertepida avicula – canyonland gemmed-satyr
- Cyllopsis pertepida intermedia – canyonland gemmed-satyr
- Cyllopsis pertepida maniola – canyonland gemmed-satyr
- Cyllopsis pertepida pertepida – canyonland gemmed-satyr
- Cyllopsis pseudopephredo – Chermock's gemmed-satyr
- Cyllopsis pyracmon henshawi (form nabokovi) – Nabokov's satyr
- Cyllopsis pyracmon henshawi – Nabokov's satyr
- Cyllopsis pyracmon pyracmon – Nabokov's satyr
- Cyllopsis schausi – Schaus' gemmed-satyr
- Cyllopsis steinhauserorum – Steinhauser's gemmed-satyr
- Cyllopsis suivalenoides – big-eyed gemmed-satyr
- Cyllopsis suivalens escalantei – Dyar's gemmed-satyr
- Cyllopsis suivalens suivalens – Dyar's gemmed-satyr
- Cyllopsis whiteorum – dark gemmed-satyr
- Cyllopsis windi – Wind's gemmed-satyr
- Drucina championi championi – blue-spotted satyr
- Eretris maria – Maria's satyr
- Euptychia fetna – orange-patched satyr
- Euptychia hilara – tawny-cornered satyr
- Euptychia jesia – Jesia satyr
- Euptychia rubrofasciata – red-webbed satyr
- Euptychia westwoodi – Westwood's satyr
- Forsterinaria neonympha umbracea – white-dotted satyr
- Gyrocheilus patrobas patrobas – red-bordered satyr
- Gyrocheilus patrobas tritonia – red-bordered satyr
- Hermeuptychia hermes – Hermes satyr
- Hermeuptychia sosybius – Carolina satyr
- Hermeuptychia hermybius
- Lymanopoda cinna – blue-stained satyr
- Magneuptychia alcinoe – simple satyr
- Magneuptychia libye – blue-gray satyr
- Manataria hercyna maculata – white-spotted satyr
- Megeuptychia antonoe – Cramer's satyr
- Megisto rubricata anabelae – red satyr
- Megisto rubricata cheneyorum – red satyr
- Megisto rubricata pseudocleophes – red satyr
- Megisto rubricata rubricata – red satyr
- Megisto rubricata smithorum – red satyr
- Oxeoschistus hilara (Guerrero) – dot-banded satyr
- Oxeoschistus hilara hilaria – dot-banded satyr
- Oxeoschistus tauropolis tauropolis – yellow-patched satyr
- Paramacera allyni – Arizona pine-satyr
- Paramacera chinanteca – Oaxacan pine-satyr
- Paramacera copiosa – Guerrero pine-satyr
- Paramacera xicaque rubrosuffusa – Mexican pine-satyr
- Paramacera xicaque xicaque – Mexican pine-satyr
- Pareuptychia metaleuca metaleuca – white-banded satyr
- Pareuptychia ocirrhoe – white satyr
- Pedaliodes circumducta – circumducta satyr
- Pedaliodes dejecta dejecta – dejected satyr
- Pedaliodes napaea – Napaea satyr
- Pedaliodes species – West-Mexican satyr
- Pierella luna rubecula – moon satyr
- Pindis squamistriga – variable satyr
- Pseudodebis zimri – Butler's satyr
- Pseudomaniola gigas – orange-bordered satyr
- Satyrotaygetis satyrina – wide-bordered satyr
- Splendeuptychia kendalli – Kendall's satyr
- Taygetis inconspicua – inconspicuous satyr
- Taygetis kerea – kerea satyr
- Taygetis mermeria excavata – great satyr
- Taygetis mermeria griseomarginata – great satyr
- Taygetis rufomarginata – rufous-margined satyr
- Taygetis sosis – Sosis satyr
- Taygetis thamyra – Thamyra satyr
- Taygetis uncinata – hook-lined satyr
- Taygetis uzza – Uzza satyr
- Taygetis virgilia – stub-tailed satyr
- Taygetis weymeri – Mexican satyr
- Yphthimoides renata – Renata satyr
- Zischkaia lupita – Lupita's satyr
- Zischkaia pellonia – plateau satyr

== Hesperiidae ==
=== Eudaminae ===
- Achalarus albociliatus albociliatus – white-edged cloudywing
- Achalarus casica – desert cloudywing
- Achalarus lyciades – hoary edge
- Achalarus tehuacana – Tehuacan cloudywing
- Achalarus toxeus – coyote cloudywing
- Aguna albistria leucogramma – white-striped aguna
- Aguna asander asander – gold-spotted aguna
- Aguna aurunce hypozonius – Hewitson's aguna
- Aguna claxon – emerald aguna
- Aguna coeloides – Austin's aguna
- Aguna metophis – long-tailed aguna
- Astraptes alardus latia – frosted flasher
- Astraptes alector hopfferi – Gilbert's flasher
- Astraptes anaphus annetta – yellow-tipped flasher
- Astraptes apastus apastus – broad-banded flasher
- Astraptes aulestis – aulestis flasher
- Astraptes brevicauda – short-tailed flasher
- Astraptes chiriquensis chiriquensis – Chiriqui flasher
- Astraptes creteus crana – whitened flasher
- Astraptes egregius egregius – small-spotted flasher
- Astraptes enotrus – white-spotted flasher
- Astraptes fulgerator azul – two-barred flasher, flashing astraptes
- Astraptes janeira – Schaus' flasher
- Astraptes latimargo bifascia – green-headed flasher
- Astraptes megalurus – long-tailed flasher
- Astraptes phalaecus – yellow-edged flasher
- Astraptes talus – green flasher
- Astraptes tucuti – Tucuti flasher
- Astraptes weymeri – Weymer's flasher
- Astraptes species – Steinhauser's flasher
- Autochton bipunctatus – Gmelin's banded-skipper
- Autochton cellus – golden banded-skipper
- Autochton cincta – Chisos banded-skipper
- Autochton longipennis – spike banded-skipper
- Autochton neis – broad banded-skipper
- Autochton pseudocellus – Sonoran banded-skipper
- Autochton siermadror – East-Mexican banded-skipper
- Autochton vectilucis – Central American banded-skipper
- Autochton zarex – sharp banded-skipper
- Bungalotis astylos – dark-cheeked scarlet-eye
- Bungalotis erythus – spotted scarlet-eye
- Bungalotis midas – white-cheeked scarlet-eye
- Bungalotis milleri – Miller's scarlet-eye
- Bungalotis qudratum quadratum – pallid scarlet-eye
- Cabares potrillo potrillo – Potrillo skipper
- Calliades zeutus – zeutus banded-skipper
- Cephise aelius – longtailed scarlet-eye
- Cephise guatemalaensis – Guatemalan scarlet-eye
- Cephise mexicanus – Mexican scarlet-eye
- Cephise nuspesez – Burns' scarlet-eye
- Chioides albofasciatus – white-striped longtail
- Chioides zilpa – Zilpa longtail
- Chrysoplectrum epicincea – stub-tailed skipper
- Codatractus alcaeus alcaeus – white-crescent mottled-skipper
- Codatractus arizonensis – Arizona mottled-skipper
- Codatractus bryaxis – golden mottled-skipper
- Codatractus carlos carlos – Carlos' mottled-skipper
- Codatractus cyda – cyda mottled-skipper
- Codatractus cyledis – cyledis mottled-skipper
- Codatractus hyster – hyster skipper
- Codatractus melon – melon mottled-skipper
- Codatractus sallyae – Sally's mottled-skipper
- Codatractus uvydixa – variable mottled-skipper
- Codatractus valeriana – valeriana skipper
- Codatractus yucatanus – Yucatán mottled-skipper
- Cogia aventinus – trimmed skipper
- Cogia caicus caicus – gold-costa skipper
- Cogia caicus moschus – gold-costa skipper
- Cogia cajeta cajeta – yellow-haired skipper
- Cogia cajeta eluina – darkened yellow-haired skipper
- Cogia calchas – mimosa skipper
- Cogia hippalus hippalus – acacia skipper
- Cogia hippalus hiska – East-Mexican acacia skipper
- Cogia hippalus peninsularis – Baja acacia skipper
- Cogia mala – Guatemalan skipper
- Cogia outis – Outis skipper
- Drephalys dumeril – Dumeril skipper
- Drephalys oria – Oria skipper
- Drephalys oriander – oriander skipper
- Dyscophellus nicephorus – two-spotted scarlet-eye
- Dyscophellus phraxanor lama – big-spotted scarlet-eye
- Dyscophellus porcius porcius – fiery scarlet-eye
- Dyscophellus ramusis ramon – plain scarlet-eye
- Entheus crux – Mexican entheus
- Entheus matho matho – giant entheus
- Epargyreus aspina – spineless silverdrop
- Epargyreus brodkorbi – barely-spotted silverdrop
- Epargyreus clarus californicus – California silver-spotted skipper
- Epargyreus clarus clarus – silver-spotted skipper
- Epargyreus clarus huachuca – Arizona silver-spotted skipper
- Epargyreus clavicornis gaumeri – small-spotted silverdrop
- Epargyreus deleoni – long-spotted silverdrop
- Epargyreus exadeus cruza – broken silverdrop
- Epargyreus socus orizaba – round-spotted silverdrop
- Epargyreus spina spina – spined silverdrop
- Epargyreus spinosa – suffused silverdrop
- Epargyreus windi – Wind's silverdrop
- Hyalothyrus neleus pemphigargyra – dimorphic skipper
- Naracosius samson – Samson flasher
- Narcosius colossus colossus – colossal flasher
- Narcosius nazaraeus – Nazareus flasher
- Narcosius parisi helen – steely flasher
- Nascus broteas – Broteas scarlet-eye
- Nascus paulliniae – least scarlet-eye
- Nascus phintias – Schaus' scarlet-eye
- Nascus phocus – common scarlet-eye
- Nascus solon corilla – Corilla scarlet-eye
- Ocyba calathana calanus – yellow-rimmed scarlet-eye
- Phanus albiapicalis – white-tipped phanus
- Phanus confusis – confusing phanus
- Phanus marshallii – common phanus
- Phanus obscurior obscurior – dark phanus
- Phanus rilma – West-Mexican phanus
- Phanus vitreus – widespread phanus
- Phocides belus – Belus skipper
- Phocides pigmalion pigmalion – Pigmalion skipper
- Phocides polybius lilea – guava skipper
- Phocides thermus thermus – Thermus skipper
- Phocides urania urania – Urania skipper
- Polygonus leo arizonensis – hammock skipper
- Polygonus savigny savigny – Manuel's skipper
- Polythrix asine – Asine longtail
- Polythrix auginus – Auginus longtail
- Polythrix caunus – four-spotted longtail
- Polythrix kanshul – Kanshul longtail
- Polythrix metallescens – metallescens skipper
- Polythrix mexicanus – Mexican longtail
- Polythrix octomaculata – eight-spotted longtail
- Proteides mercurius mercurius – Mercurial skipper
- Ridens allyni – Allyn's ridens
- Ridens crison crison – many-spotted ridens
- Ridens mephitis – Hewitson's ridens
- Ridens mercedes – white-tailed ridens
- Ridens miltas – Mexican ridens
- Ridens toddi – Todd's skipper
- Spathilepia clonius – falcate skipper
- Telemiades avitus – yellow-spotted telemiades
- Telemiades choricus – Mexican telemiades
- Telemiades delalande – Delalande skipper
- Telemiades fides – small telemiades
- Telemiades megallus – orange telemiades
- Telemiades nicomedes – dark telemiades
- Thessia jalapus – jalapus cloudywing
- Thorybes drusius – Drusius cloudywing, white-fringed cloudywing
- Thorybes mexicana dobra – Mexican cloudywing
- Thorybes mexicana mexicana – Mexican cloudywing
- Thorybes pylades albosuffusa – northern cloudywing
- Thorybes pylades indistinctus – northern cloudywing
- Thorybes pylades pylades – northern cloudywing
- Typhedanus ampyx – gold-tufted skipper
- Typhedanus salas – Salas skipper
- Typhedanus undulatus – mottled longtail
- Udranomia kikkawai – nervous skipper
- Udranomia orcinus – Orcinus skipper
- Urbanus albimargo albimargo – white-edged longtail
- Urbanus belli – Bell's longtail
- Urbanus dorantes calafia – Dorantes longtail
- Urbanus dorantes dorantes – Dorantes longtail
- Urbanus doryssus chales – white-tailed longtail
- Urbanus esmeraldus – Esmeralda longtail
- Urbanus esta – esta longtail
- Urbanus evona – turquoise longtail
- Urbanus procne – brown longtail
- Urbanus prodicus – montane longtail
- Urbanus pronta – spot-banded longtail
- Urbanus pronus – pronus longtail
- Urbanus proteus proteus – long-tailed skipper
- Urbanus simplicius – plain longtail
- Urbanus tanna – Tanna longtail
- Urbanus teleus – Teleus longtail
- Urbanus velinus – Velinus skipper
- Urbanus viridis – rare longtail
- Urbanus viterboana – bluish longtail
- Venada species – cryptic scarlet-eye
- Zestusa dorus – short-tailed skipper (northern zestusa)
- Zestusa elwesi – Mexican zestusa
- Zestusa levona – Levona's zestusa
- Zestusa staudingeri – southern zestusa
- Zestusa species – Transvolcanic zestusa
- Zestusa species – unfolded zestusa

=== Pyrginae ===
==== Pyrrhopygini ====
- Amysoria galgala – red-banded firetip
- Apyrrothrix araxes araxes – Araxes skipper
- Apyrrothrix araxes arizonae – Arizona Araxes skipper
- Azonax typhaon – Typhaon skipper
- Chalypyge chalybea chalybea – orange-rimmed skipper
- Chalypyge chalybea chloris – orange-rimmed skipper
- Elbella miodesmiata – Rober's skipper
- Elbella patrobas mexicana – Patrobas skipper
- Elbella scylla – Scylla firetip
- Jemadia pseudognetus – dot-collared skipper
- Jonaspyge jonas – scallop-edged firetip
- Jonaspyge tzotzili – Freeman's firetip
- Melanopyge erythrosticta – red-dotted skipper
- Melanopyge hoffmanni – Hoffmann's skipper
- Melanopyge mulleri – red-spotted skipper
- Melanopyge species
- Myscelus amystis hages – widespread myscelus
- Myscelus assaricus michaeli – fiery myscelus
- Myscelus belti – Belt's myscelus
- Myscelus perissodora – Dyar's myscelus
- Mysoria affinis – red-collared firetip
- Mysoria amra – blue-collared firetip
- Mysoria barcatus ambigua – ambigua firetip
- Oxynetra hopfferi – Hopffer's firetip
- Parelbella macleannani – Macleannan's skipper
- Pyrrhopyge crida – white-banded firetip
- Pyrrhopyge zenodorus – red-headed firetip
- Zonia zonia pama – Pama skipper

==== Celaenorrhinini ====
- Celaenorrhinus cynapes cynapes – small flat
- Celaenorrhinus fritzgaertneri – Fritzgaertner's flat
- Celaenorrhinus monartus – dotted flat
- Celaenorrhinus stallingsi – Stallings' flat
- Celaenorrhinus stola – stola flat

==== Carcharodini ====
- Arteurotia tractipennis tractipennis – starred skipper
- Bolla brennus brennus – obscure sootywing
- Bolla clytius – mottled sootywing
- Bolla cupreiceps – copper-headed sootywing
- Bolla cybele – Veracruzan sootywing
- Bolla cyclops – Cyclops sootywing
- Bolla cylindus – checkered sootywing
- Bolla eusebius – spatulate sootywing
- Bolla evippe – rough-tipped sootywing
- Bolla fenestra – Oaxacan sootywing
- Bolla guerra – Guerrero sootywing
- Bolla imbras – rounded sootywing
- Bolla litus – many-spotted sootywing
- Bolla oriza – Orizaba sootywing
- Bolla orsines – hook-tipped sootywing
- Bolla solitaria – solitary sootywing
- Bolla subapicatus – fin-tipped sootywing
- Bolla zorilla – zorilla sootywing
- Cyclosemia anastomosis – northern eyed-skipper
- Hesperopsis alpheus alpheus – saltbush sootywing
- Hesperopsis alpheus texana – saltbush sootywing
- Hesperopsis gracielae – MacNeill's sootywing
- Hesperopsis libya libya – Mojave sootywing
- Mictris crispus caerula – crisp skipper
- Mimia chiapaensis – Chiapan skipper
- Mimia phidyle phidyle – Phidyle skipper
- Myrinia myris – Myris skipper
- Myrinia raymundo – Raymundo's skipper
- Nisoniades castolus – Castolus tufted-skipper
- Nisoniades ephora – ephora tufted-skipper
- Nisoniades godma – godma tufted-skipper
- Nisoniades laurentina – dark tufted-skipper
- Nisoniades macarius – Macarius tufted-skipper
- Nisoniades rubescens – purplish tufted-skipper
- Noctuana lactifera bipuncta – cryptic skipper
- Noctuana stator – red-studded skipper
- Pachyneuria licisca – immaculate tufted-skipper
- Pellicia angra angra – rare tufted-skipper
- Pellicia arina – glazed tufted-skipper
- Pellicia dimidiata – morning glory tufted-skipper
- Pholisora catullus – common sootywing
- Pholisora mejicanus – Mexican sootywing
- Polyctor cleta – Cleta tufted-skipper
- Polyctor enops – Enops tufted-skipper
- Staphylus ascalaphus – Central American sootywing
- Staphylus azteca – Aztec sootywing
- Staphylus ceos – golden-headed sootywing
- Staphylus iguala – Iguala sootywing
- Staphylus lenis – lenis sootywing
- Staphylus mazans – Mazans sootywing
- Staphylus tepeca – grizzled sootywing
- Staphylus tierra – West-Mexican sootywing
- Staphylus vincula – mountain sootywing
- Staphylus vulgata – golden-snouted sootywing
- Windia windi – Wind's skipper

==== Erynnini ====
- Anastrus luctuosus – West-Mexican anastrus
- Anastrus meliboea meliboea – scarce anastrus
- Anastrus neaeris neaeris – brilliant anastrus
- Anastrus petius peto – Peto skipper
- Anastrus sempiternus sempiternus – common anastrus
- Anastrus tolimus tolimus – blurry anastrus
- Anastrus virens albopannus – Austin's anastrus
- Camptopleura auxo – Auxo bent-skipper
- Camptopleura oaxaca – Oaxacan bent-skipper
- Camptopleura theramenes – Mabille's bent-skipper
- Chiomara georgina georgina – white-patched skipper
- Chiomara georgina pelagica – white-patched skipper
- Chiomara mithrax – mithrax duskywing
- Cycloglypha thrasibulus thrasibulus – widespread bent-skipper
- Cycloglypha tisias – Tisias bent-skipper
- Ebrietas anacreon anacreon – common bent-skipper
- Ebrietas elaudia livius – plain bent-skipper
- Ebrietas evanidus – blurred bent-skipper
- Ebrietas osyris – yellow-patched bent-skipper
- Ebrietas sappho – sappho bent-skipper
- Erynnis afranius – Afranius duskywing
- Erynnis brizo brizo – sleepy duskywing
- Erynnis brizo burgessi – Rocky Mountain sleepy duskywing
- Erynnis brizo lacustra – Lacustra sleepy duskywing
- Erynnis brizo mulleri – white-fringed sleepy duskywing
- Erynnis funeralis – funereal duskywing
- Erynnis horatius – Horace's duskywing
- Erynnis juvenalis clitus – Clitus duskywing
- Erynnis juvenalis juvenalis – Juvenal's duskywing
- Erynnis mercurius – Mexican duskywing
- Erynnis meridianus fieldi – white-fringed meridian duskywing
- Erynnis meridianus meridianus – meridian duskywing
- Erynnis pacuvius callidus – Californian Pacuvius duskywing
- Erynnis pacuvius pacuvius – Pacuvius duskywing
- Erynnis propertius – Propertius duskywing
- Erynnis scudderi – Scudder's duskywing
- Erynnis tristis pattersoni – dark-fringed mournful duskywing
- Erynnis tristis tatius – Mexican mournful duskywing
- Erynnis tristis tristis – mournful duskywing
- Gesta invisus – false duskywing
- Gorgythion begga pyralina – variegated skipper
- Gorgythion vox – crab's-claw skipper
- Grais stigmaticus stigmaticus – hermit skipper
- Helias cama – squared bent-skipper
- Mylon ander – narrow-winged mylon
- Mylon cajus hera – cryptic mylon
- Mylon cristata – Austin's mylon
- Mylon jason – Jason's mylon
- Mylon lassia – bold mylon
- Mylon maimon – common mylon
- Mylon pelopidas – pale mylon
- Mylon salvia – Evans' mylon
- Potamanaxas unifasciata – Felder's skipper
- Sostrata nordica – blue-studded skipper
- Theagenes aegides – white-centered bent-skipper
- Timochares ruptifasciata – brown-banded skipper
- Timochares trifasciata trifasciata – many-banded skipper
- Tosta gorgus – Gorgus skipper
- Tosta platypterus – platypterus skipper

==== Achlyodidini ====
- Achlyodes busirus heros – giant sicklewing
- Achlyodes pallida – pale sicklewing
- Aethilla chiapa – highlands skipper
- Aethilla echina echina – echina skipper
- Aethilla lavochrea – yellow-rimmed skipper
- Atarnes sallei – orange-spotted skipper
- Doberes anticus – dark doberes
- Doberes hewitsonius – pale doberes
- Doberes sobrinus – West-Mexican doberes
- Eantis tamenund – northern sicklewing (sickle-winged skipper)
- Eantis thraso – southern sicklewing
- Gindanes brebisson panaetius – white-trailed skipper
- Gindanes brontinus brontinus – straight-edged skipper
- Ouleus bubaris – Bubaris skipper
- Ouleus cyrna – hidden-yellow skipper
- Ouleus salvina – Salvin's skipper
- Pythonides grandis assecla – many-spotted blue-skipper
- Pythonides jovianus amaryllis – variable blue-skipper
- Pythonides mundo – Freeman's blue-skipper
- Pythonides proxenus – proxenus blue-skipper
- Pythonides pteras – narrow-winged blue-skipper
- Pythonides rosa – Steinhauser's blue-skipper
- Quadrus cerialis – common blue-skipper
- Quadrus contubernalis anicius – Guatemalan' striped blue-skipper
- Quadrus contubernalis contubernalis – striped blue-skipper
- Quadrus francesius – Chiapan blue-skipper
- Quadrus lugubris – tanned blue-skipper
- Zera belti – belti skipper
- Zera difficilis – difficult skipper
- Zera eboneus – eboneus skipper
- Zera hyacinthinius hyacinthinus – bruised skipper
- Zera phila hosta – hosta skipper
- Zera tetrastigma tetrastigma – tetrastigma skipper

==== Pyrgini ====
- Anisochoria bacchus – northern snout-skipper
- Antigonus corrosus – small spurwing
- Antigonus emorsa – white spurwing
- Antigonus erosus – common spurwing
- Antigonus funebris – West-Mexican spurwing
- Antigonus nearchus – large spurwing
- Carrhenes calidius – rain-forest hoary-skipper
- Carrhenes callipetes – cloud-forest hoary-skipper
- Carrhenes canescens canescens – hoary skipper
- Carrhenes fuscescens fuscescens – tanned hoary-skipper
- Celotes limpia – West-Texas streaky-skipper
- Celotes nessus – common streaky-skipper
- Clito aberrans – northern clito
- Clito zelotes – Hewitson's clito
- Diaeus varna – camouflaged skipper
- Eracon paulinus – tear-drop skipper
- Heliopetes alana – Alana white-skipper
- Heliopetes arsalte – veined white-skipper
- Heliopetes ericetorum – northern white-skipper
- Heliopetes laviana laviana – Laviana white-skipper
- Heliopetes macaira macaira – Turk's-cap white-skipper
- Heliopyrgus domicella domicella – Erichson's white-skipper
- Heliopyrgus sublinea – East-Mexican white-skipper
- Onenses hyalophora – crystal-winged skipper
- Paches loxus gloriosus – glorious blue-skipper
- Paches polla – polla blue-skipper
- Pyrgus adepta – Central American checkered-skipper
- Pyrgus albescens – white checkered-skipper
- Pyrgus communis – common checkered-skipper
- Pyrgus oileus – tropical checkered-skipper
- Pyrgus orcus – Orcus checkered-skipper
- Pyrgus philetas – desert checkered-skipper
- Pyrgus scriptura apertorum – small checkered-skipper
- Systasea microsticta – rare spurwing
- Systasea pulverulenta – Texas powdered-skipper
- Systasea zampa – Arizona powdered-skipper
- xenophanes tryxus – glassy-winged skipper
- Zobera albopunctata – Coliman zobera
- Zobera marginata – western zobera
- Zobera oaxaquena – Oaxacan zobera
- Zopyrion sandace – sandy skipper

=== Heteropterinae ===
- Dalla bubobon – bubobon skipperling
- Dalla dividuum – Dyar's skipperling
- Dalla faula – West-Mexican skipperling
- Dalla freemani – Freeman's skipperling
- Dalla kemneri – Pelon skipperling
- Dalla lalage – Godman's skipperling
- Dalla lethaea – Schaus' skipperling
- Dalla ligilla – ligilla skipperling
- Dalla mentor – Guerrero skipperling
- Dalla nubes – Chiapan skipperling
- Dalla ramirezi – gold-rayed skipperling
- Dalla steinhauseri – Steinhauser's skipperling
- Dardarina dardaris – Dardaris skipperling
- Piruna aea aea – many-spotted skipperling
- Piruna aea mexicana – many-spotted skipperling
- Piruna brunnea – chocolate skipperling
- Piruna ceracates – Veracruz skipperling
- Piruna cyclosticta – plateau skipperling
- Piruna dampfi – violet-dusted skipperling
- Piruna gyrans – variable skipperling
- Piruna haferniki – Chisos skipperling
- Piruna jonka – Oaxacan skipperling
- Piruna kemneri – Kemner's skipperling
- Piruna maculata – Sinaloan skipperling
- Piruna microsticta – Southwest-Mexican skipperling
- Piruna millerorum – Millers' skipperling
- Piruna mullinsi – Mullins' skipperling
- Piruna penaea – hour-glass skipperling
- Piruna polingii – four-spotted skipperling
- Piruna purepecha – Purepecha skipperling
- Piruna roeveri – Roever's skipperling
- Piruna sina – fine-spotted skipperling

=== Hesperiinae ===
==== Incertae sedis ====
- Adlerodea petrovna – Petrovna skipper
- Amblyscirtes aenus erna – bronze roadside-skipper
- Amblyscirtes aenus megamacula – bronze roadside-skipper
- Amblyscirtes anubis – half-edged roadside-skipper
- Amblyscirtes brocki – Brock's roadside-skipper
- Amblyscirtes cassus – cassus roadside-skipper
- Amblyscirtes celia – Celia's roadside-skipper
- Amblyscirtes elissa arizonae – Elissa roadside-skipper
- Amblyscirtes elissa elissa – Elissa roadside-skipper
- Amblyscirtes eos – dotted roadside-skipper
- Amblyscirtes exoteria – large roadside-skipper
- Amblyscirtes fimbriata fimbriata – orange-edged roadside-skipper
- Amblyscirtes fimbriata pallida – white-edged roadside-skipper
- Amblyscirtes fluonia – brassy roadside-skipper
- Amblyscirtes folia – larger roadside-skipper
- Amblyscirtes nereus – slaty roadside-skipper
- Amblyscirtes novimmaculatus – immaculate roadside-skipper
- Amblyscirtes nysa – Nysa roadside-skipper
- Amblyscirtes oslari – Oslar's roadside-skipper
- Amblyscirtes patriciae – Patricia's roadside-skipper
- Amblyscirtes phylace – orange-headed roadside-skipper
- Amblyscirtes raphaeli – giant roadside-skipper
- Amblyscirtes texanae – Texas roadside-skipper
- Amblyscirtes tolteca prenda – Toltec roadside-skipper
- Amblyscirtes tolteca tolteca – Toltec roadside-skipper
- Anthoptus epictetus – trailside skipper
- Anthoptus inculta – inculta skipper
- Anthoptus insignis – immaculate skipper
- Anthoptus macalpinei – McAlpine's skipper
- Arita arita – arita skipper
- Callimormus juventus – Juventus skipper
- Callimormus radiola radiola – radiant skipper
- Callimormus saturnus – Saturnus skipper
- Cantha roraimae – Roraima skipper
- Cobalopsis autumna – autumna skipper
- Cobalopsis nero – Nero skipper
- Corticea corticea – redundant skipper
- Corticea lysias lysias – Lysias skipper
- Corticea similea – similar skipper
- Cymaenes alumna – alumna skipper
- Cymaenes fraus – frosty-banded skipper
- Cymaenes laurelolus laureolus – Laureolus skipper
- Cymaenes theogenis – Theogenis skipper
- Cymaenes trebius – fawn-spotted skipper
- Enosis achelous – ferruginous skipper
- Enosis immaculata immaculata – immaculata skipper
- Enosis matheri – Mather's skipper
- Eprius veleda veleda – Veleda skipper
- Eutocus facilis – facilis skipper
- Eutychide complana – compliant skipper
- Eutychide paria – gold-dot skipper
- Eutychide subcordata ochus – Ochus skipper
- Falga sciras – Sciras skipper
- Flaccilla aecas – aecas ruby-eye
- Halotus jonaveriorum – John-and-Avery's skipper
- Halotus rica – Costa Rican skipper
- Inglorius mediocris – mediocre skipper
- Joanna joanna – Joanna's skipper
- Justinia norda – false saliana
- Lento hermione hermione – Hermione skipper
- Lerema accius accius – clouded skipper
- Lerema liris – Liris skipper
- Lerema lumina – overcast skipper
- Lerodea arabus – violet-clouded skipper
- Lerodea eufala eufala – Eufala skipper
- Lycas argentea – silvered ruby-eye
- Methion melas – rusty skipper
- Methionopsis dolor – dolor skipper
- Methionopsis ina – Ina skipper
- Methionopsis typhon – Typhon skipper
- Mnaseas bicolor – dull skipper
- Mnasicles geta – violet-frosted skipper
- Mnasicles hicetaon – gray skipper
- Mnasilus allubita – Butler's skipper
- Mnasinous patage – black-veined skipper
- Mnasitheus cephoides – cephoides skipper
- Mnasitheus chrysophrys – chrysophrys skipper
- Mnasitheus nitra – Nitra skipper
- Moeris hyagnis hyagnis – Hyagnis skipper
- Moeris striga stroma – flag skipper
- Monca crispinus – violet-patched skipper
- Monca jera – jera skipper
- Monca telata – Telata skipper
- Morys lyde – violet-studded skipper
- Morys micythus – Micythus skipper
- Morys valda – Valda skipper
- Mucia zygia – black-dotted skipper
- Naevolus orius – Orius skipper
- Nastra julia – Julia's skipper
- Nastra leucone leucone – Leucone skipper
- Niconiades comitana – Comitana skipper
- Niconiades incomptus – half-tailed skipper
- Niconiades nikko – Nikko skipper
- Niconiades viridis vista – vista skipper
- Onophas columbaria columbaria – blue-glossed skipper
- Orses cynisca – yellow-edged ruby-eye
- Papias dictys – bottom-spotted skipper
- Papias phaeomelas – Hubner's skipper
- Papias phainis – somber skipper
- Papias subcostulata – jungle skipper
- Paracarystus hypargyra – hypargyra skipper
- Parphorus decora – decora skipper
- Parphorus storax – storax skipper
- Parphorus species – Nayarit skipper
- Parphorus species – Tamaulipas skipper
- Perichares lotus – lotus ruby-eye
- Perichares philetes adela – green-backed ruby-eye
- Phanes aletes – jeweled skipper
- Phanes almoda – almoda skipper
- Pheraeus covadonga covadonga – eastern Covadonga skipper
- Pheraeus covadonga loxicha – western Covadonga skipper
- Phlebodes campo sifax – Sifax skipper
- Remella duena – Guatemalan remella
- Remella remus – black-spot remella
- Remella rita – Rita's remella
- Remella vopiscus – cryptic remella
- Repens florus – false roadside-skipper
- Rhinthon osca – Osca skipper
- Saturnus reticulata obscurus – Bell's skipper
- Styriodes dedecora – dedecora skipper
- Sucova sucova – Sucova skipper
- Synapte pecta – northern faceted-skipper
- Synapte salenus – Salenus faceted-skipper
- Synapte shiva – faded faceted-skipper
- Synapte silius – rain-forest faceted-skipper
- Synapte silna – Southwest-Mexican faceted-skipper
- Synapte syraces – bold faceted-skipper
- Thargella caura caura – round-winged skipper
- Thoon modius – moody skipper
- Tigasis nausiphanes – cloud-forest skipper
- Tigasis simplex – simple skipper
- Vehilius inca – Inca skipper
- Vehilius stictomenes illudens – pasture skipper
- Vertica ibis – ibis skipper
- Vertica subrufescens – subrufescens skipper
- Vertica verticalis coatepeca – vertical skipper
- Vettius coryna argentus – Chiapan silver-plated skipper
- Vettius coryna conka – silver-plated skipper
- Vettius fantasos – fantastic skipper
- Vettius lafrenaye pica – two-toned skipper
- Vettius marcus – Marcus skipper
- Vettius onaca – Onaca skipper
- Vettius tertianus – blurry skipper
- Vidius perigenes – pale-rayed skipper
- Vinius tryhana tryhana – gold-washed skipper
- Vinpeius tinga – Freeman's skipper
- Virga clenchi – Clench's skipper
- Virga virginius – Virginius skipper
- Zariaspes mys – mys skipper
- Zariaspes mythecus – Godman's skipper

==== Megathymini ====
- Aegiale hesperiaris – tequila giant-skipper
- Agathymus aryxna – Arizona giant-skipper
- Agathymus belli – Bell's giant-skipper
- Agathymus comstocki – Comstock's giant-skipper
- Agathymus dawsoni – Dawson's giant-skipper
- Agathymus escalantei – Escalante's giant-skipper
- Agathymus estelleae estelleae – Estelle's giant-skipper
- Agathymus evansi – Huachuca giant-skipper
- Agathymus fieldi – Field's giant-skipper
- Agathymus hoffmanni – Hoffmann's giant-skipper
- Agathymus indecisa – Guatemalan giant-skipper
- Agathymus juliae – Julia's giant-skipper
- Agathymus mariae – Mary's giant-skipper
- Agathymus micheneri – Michener's giant-skipper
- Agathymus neumoegeni – Neumoegen's giant-skipper
- Agathymus remingtoni – Remington's giant-skipper
- Agathymus rethon – black giant-skipper
- Agathymus ricei – Rice's giant-skipper
- Agathymus stephensi – California giant-skipper
- Agathymus species
- Megathymus beulahae beulahae – broad-banded giant-skipper
- Megathymus beulahae gayleae – broad-banded giant-skipper
- Megathymus ursus ursus – ursine giant-skipper
- Megathymus ursus violae – ursine giant-skipper
- Megathymus yuccae arizonae – yucca giant-skipper
- Megathymus yuccae harbisoni – yucca giant-skipper
- Megathymus yuccae louiseae – yucca giant-skipper
- Megathymus yuccae reubeni – yucca giant-skipper
- Megathymus yuccae wilsonorum – yucca giant-skipper
- Stallingsia jacki – Chiapan giant-skipper
- Stallingsia maculosus – Manfreda giant-skipper
- Stallingsia smithi – Smith's giant-skipper
- Turnerina hazelae – Guerrero giant-skipper
- Turnerina mejicanus – Turner's giant-skipper

==== Hesperiini ====
- Adopaeoides bistriata – silver-rayed skipper
- Adopaeoides prittwitzi – sunrise skipper
- Aides brilla – brilliant silverpatch
- Aides dysoni – Dyson's silverpatch
- Anatrytone logan lagus – Delaware skipper
- Anatrytone mazai – De la Maza's skipper
- Anatrytone mella – Mella skipper
- Anatrytone potosiensis – Potosi skipper
- Ancyloxypha arene – tropical least skipper
- Ancyloxypha numitor – least skipper
- Argon lota – argon skipper
- Atalopedes campestris campestris – sachem
- Atalopedes campestris huron – sachem
- Atrytonopsis cestus – cestus skipper
- Atrytonopsis deva – Deva skipper
- Atrytonopsis edwardsii – sheep skipper
- Atrytonopsis frappenda – Pedegral skipper
- Atrytonopsis lunus – moon-marked skipper
- Atrytonopsis ovinia – Ovinia skipper
- Atrytonopsis pittacus – white-barred skipper
- Atrytonopsis python – python skipper
- Atrytonopsis vierecki – Viereck's skipper
- Atrytonopsis zweifeli – Zweifel's skipper
- Calpodes ethlius – Brazilian skipper
- Carystoides abrahami – Abraham's ruby-eye
- Carystoides basoches – basoches ruby-eye
- Carystoides escalantei – Escalante's ruby-eye
- Carystoides floresi – Freeman's ruby-eye
- Carystoides hondura – Honduran ruby-eye
- Carystoides lila – Lila ruby-eye
- Carystoides mexicana – Mexican ruby-eye
- Carystoides sicania orbius – yellow-spotted ruby-eye
- Carystus phorcus phorcus – white-patched ruby-eye
- Cobalus virbius fidicula – white-centered ruby-eye
- Conga chydaea – hidden-ray skipper
- Copaeodes aurantiaca – orange skipperling
- Copaeodes minima – southern skipperling
- Cynea anthracinus – anthracinus skipper
- Cynea corope – corope skipper
- Cynea cynea – cynea skipper
- Cynea diluta – diluted skipper
- Cynea irma – fogged skipper
- Cynea megalops – megalops skipper
- Cynea nigricola – nigricola skipper
- Damas clavus – violet-washed skipper
- Decinea decinea huasteca – Huastecan skipper
- Decinea lucifer – Lucifer skipper
- Decinea mustea – Muste skipper
- Decinea percosius – double-dotted skipper
- Decinea rindgei – Rindge's skipper
- Dubiella fiscella belpa – yellow-striped ruby-eye
- Ebusus ebusus nigrior – Ebusus skipper
- Euphyes ampa – ampa skipper
- Euphyes antra – Antra skipper
- Euphyes canda – Candelaria skipper
- Euphyes chamuli – Chamul skipper
- Euphyes dion – Dion skipper
- Euphyes peneia – guardpost skipper
- Euphyes vestris harbisoni – dun skipper
- Euphyes vestris metacomet – dun skipper
- Hesperia colorado leussleri – western branded skipper
- Hesperia juba – Juba skipper
- Hesperia pahaska (Baja California Norte) – Pahaska skipper
- Hesperia pahaska williamsi – Pahaska skipper
- Hesperia uncas gilberti – Uncas skipper
- Hesperia uncas lasus – Uncas skipper
- Hesperia uncas uncas – Uncas skipper
- Hesperia viridis – green skipper
- Hesperia woodgatei – Apache skipper
- Hylephila phyleus phyleus – fiery skipper
- Librita heras – heras skipper
- Librita librita – librita skipper
- Lindra brasus – Brasus skipper
- Lychnuchoides saptine – golden-banded ruby-eye
- Metron chrysogastra chrysogastra – orange-headed metron
- Metron zimra – olive metron
- Neoxeniades luda – Luda skipper
- Neoxeniades molion – blue-based skipper
- Notamblyscirtes simius – simius skipper
- Nyctelius nyctelius nyctelius – violet-banded skipper, nyctelius skipper
- Oarisma edwardsii – Edwards' skipperling
- Oarisma era – bold-veined skipperling
- Oarisma garita calega – garita skipperling
- Ochlodes agricola agricola – rural skipper
- Ochlodes samenta – Samenta skipper
- Ochlodes sylvanoides sylvanoides – woodland skipper
- Oeonus pyste – Veracruzan skipper
- Onespa nubis – nubis skipper
- Orthos gabina – Gabina skipper
- Orthos lycortas – Lycortas skipper
- Oxynthes corusca – corusca skipper
- Panoquina errans – wandering skipper
- Panoquina evadnes – Evadnes skipper
- Panoquina evansi – Evans' skipper
- Panoquina hecebolus – Hecebolus skipper
- Panoquina lucas – purple-washed skipper
- Panoquina ocola ocola – ocola skipper
- Panoquina panoquinoides panoquinoides – beach skipper
- Panoquina pauper pauper – pauper skipper
- Paratrytone aphractoia – snowball-spotted skipper
- Paratrytone decepta – Morelos skipper
- Paratrytone gala – Gala skipper
- Paratrytone kemneri – Kemner's skipper
- Paratrytone omiltemensis – Omiltemi skipper
- Paratrytone pilza – Pilza skipper
- Paratrytone polyclea – Polyclea skipper
- Paratrytone raspa – raspa skipper
- Paratrytone rhexenor – crazy-spotted skipper
- Paratrytone snowi – Snow's skipper
- Phemiades species – phemiades skipper
- Poanes benito – Benito's skipper
- Poanes inimica – yellow-stained skipper
- Poanes melane melane – umber skipper
- Poanes melane poa – Central American umber skipper
- Poanes melane vitellina – Mexican umber skipper
- Poanes monticola – oyamel skipper
- Poanes niveolimbus – snow-fringed skipper
- Poanes taxiles – Taxiles skipper
- Poanes ulphila – ulphila skipper
- Poanes zabulon – Zabulon skipper
- Polites carus – Carus skipper
- Polites norae – Guaymas skipper
- Polites pupillus – pupilled skipper
- Polites puxillius – Mabille's skipper
- Polites rhesus – rhesus skipper
- Polites sabuleti margaretae – sandhill skipper
- Polites sabuleti sabuleti – sandhill skipper
- Polites sonora sonora – Sonoran skipper
- Polites subreticulata – subreticulate skipper
- Polites vibex praeceps – whirlabout
- Pompeius dares – Dares skipper
- Pompeius pompeius – Pompeius skipper
- Pompeius verna sequoyah – little glassywing
- Pseudocopaeodes eunus eunus – alkali skipper
- Quasimellana agnesae – coastal mellana
- Quasimellana andersoni – Anderson's mellana
- Quasimellana aurora – bright mellana
- Quasimellana balsa – sullied mellana
- Quasimellana eulogius – common mellana
- Quasimellana fieldi – Field's mellana
- Quasimellana mexicana – Mexican mellana
- Quasimellana mulleri – Muller's mellana
- Quasimellana myron – greenish mellana
- Quasimellana nayana – Nayarit mellana
- Quasimellana servilius – green mellana
- Quasimellana siblinga – sibling mellana
- Quinta cannae – Canna skipper
- Saliana antoninus – persistent saliana
- Saliana esperi esperi – perching saliana
- Saliana fusta – suffused saliana
- Saliana hewitsoni – green saliana
- Saliana longirostris – shy saliana
- Saliana saladin saladin – violet-tipped saliana
- Saliana salius – sullied saliana
- Saliana severus – dark saliana
- Saliana triangularis – triangular saliana
- Stinga morrisoni – Morrison's skipper
- Synale cynaxa – black-veined ruby-eye
- Talides alternata – alternate ruby-eye
- Talides cantra – cantra ruby-eye
- Talides sergestus – Sergestus ruby-eye
- Telles arcalaus – yellow-spotted ruby-eye
- Thespieus aspernatus – aspernatus skipper
- Thespieus dalman – chalk-marked skipper
- Thespieus macareus – chestnut-marked skipper
- Thracides phidon – jewel-studded skipper
- Thracides thrasea – Thrasea skipper
- Tirynthia conflua – conflua skipper
- Tromba xanthura – yellow-washed ruby-eye
- Turesis complanula – complanula skipper
- Turesis tabascoensis – Tabasco skipper
- Turesis theste – Theste skipper
- Vacerra cervara – Cervara skipper
- Vacerra gayra – Gayra skipper
- Vacerra litana – Litana skipper
- Wallengrenia otho clavus – pale southern broken-dash
- Wallengrenia otho otho – southern broken-dash
- Xeniades chalestra pteras – band-spotted skipper
- Xeniades orchamus orchamus – smear-spotted skipper
- Zenis jebus hemizona – purple-stained skipper
- Zenis minos – Minos skipper
