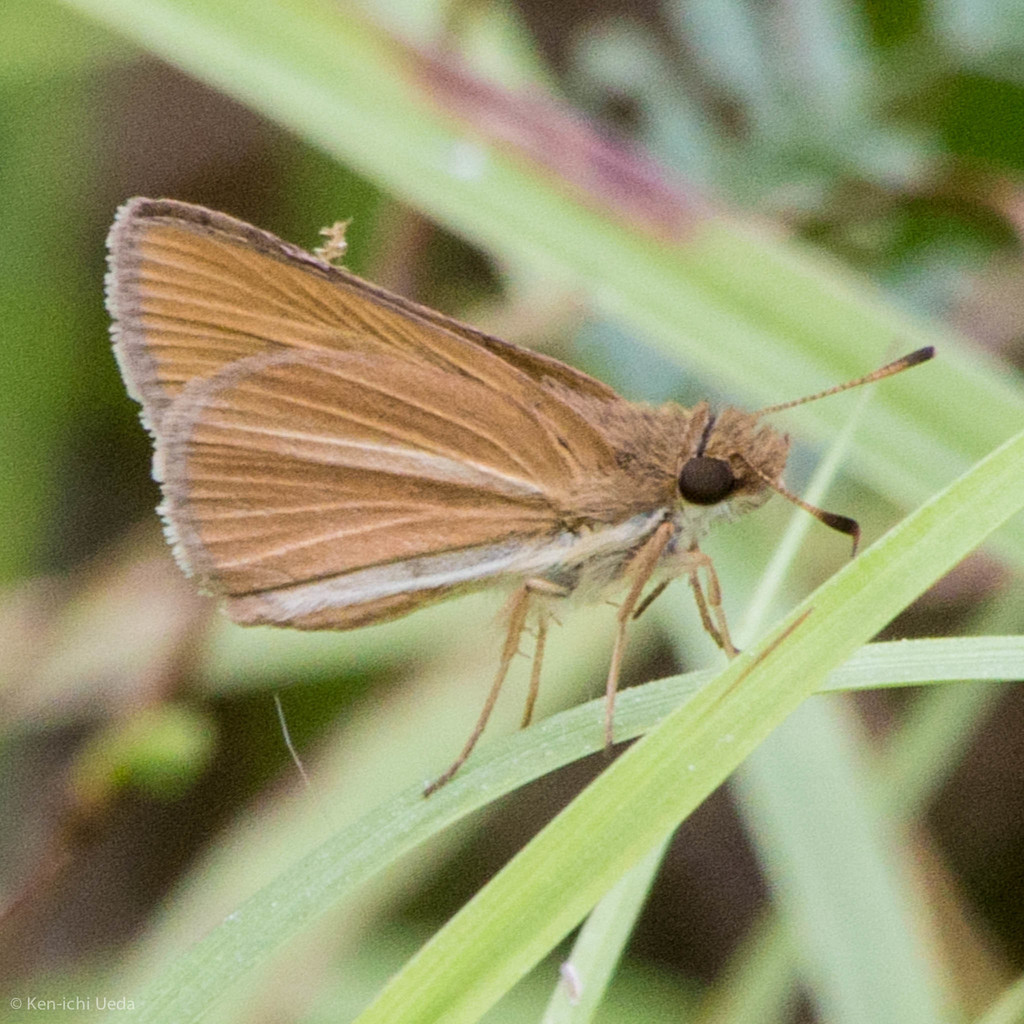

Scientific classification
- Kingdom: Animalia
- Phylum: Arthropoda
- Class: Insecta
- Order: Lepidoptera
- Family: Hesperiidae
- Genus: Vidius
- Species: V. perigenes

Binomial name
- Vidius perigenes (Godman, 1900)

= Vidius perigenes =

Species of butterfly

Vidius perigenes, known generally as the pale-rayed skipper or perigenes skipper, is a species of grass skipper in the butterfly family Hesperiidae. It is found in Central America, North America, and South America.

The MONA or Hodges number for Vidius perigenes is 3991.

== Description ==
The upperside of the butterfly is brown with no markings. The underside of the hindwing is yellow-brown with a white streak running from the base to the tip. The wingspan ranges from 7/8 to 1 1/8 inches, which is 2.2 to 2.9 centimeters.
