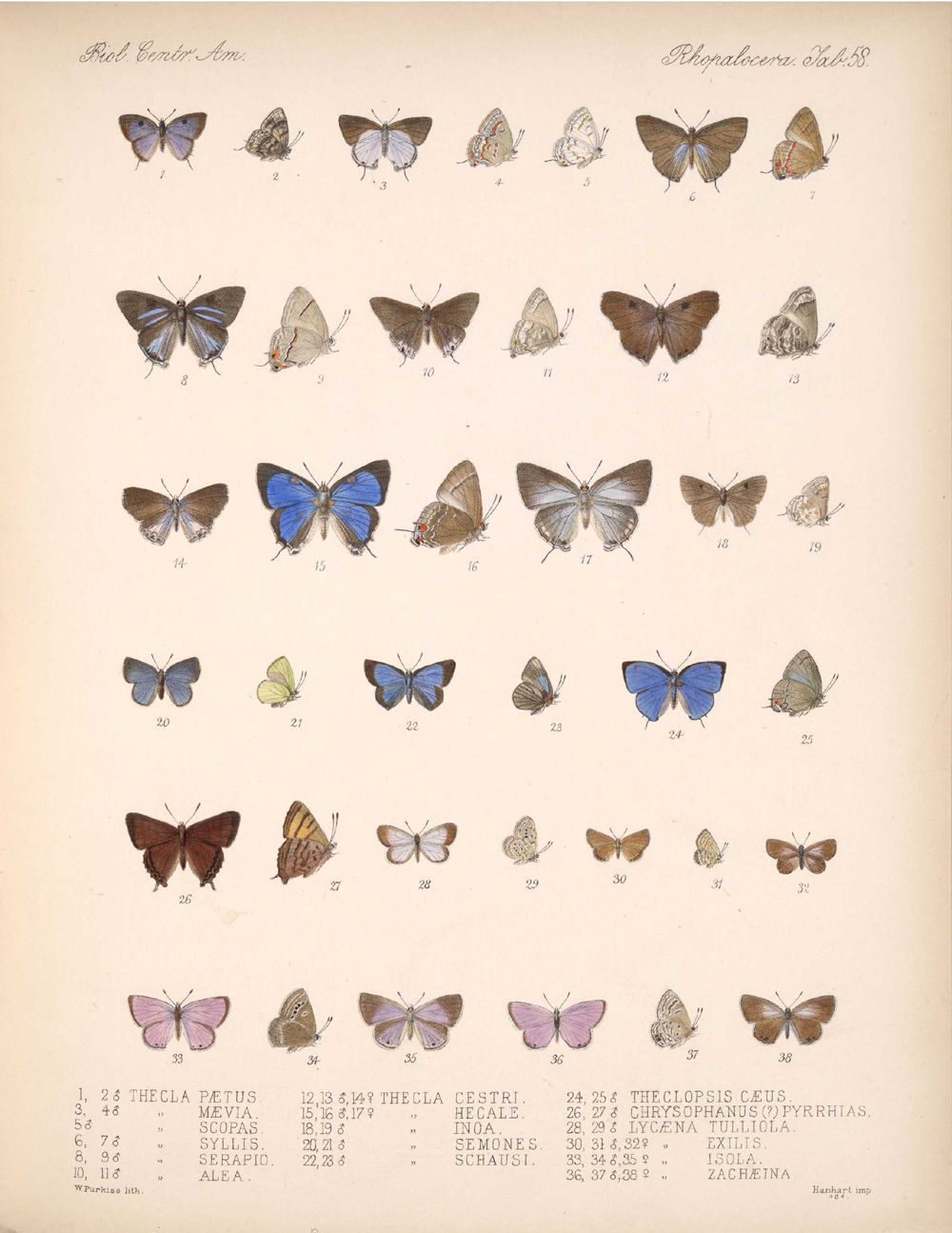
- Aubergina paetus, figures 1 and 2

Scientific classification
- Domain: Eukaryota
- Kingdom: Animalia
- Phylum: Arthropoda
- Class: Insecta
- Order: Lepidoptera
- Family: Lycaenidae
- Tribe: Eumaeini
- Genus: Aubergina; K. Johnson, 1991

= Aubergina =

Butterfly genus in family Lycaenidae

Aubergina is a genus of butterflies in the family Lycaenidae. The species of this genus are found in the Neotropical realm.

== Species ==
- Aubergina vanessoides (Prittwitz, 1865)
- Aubergina paetus (Godman & Salvin, [1887])
- Aubergina hicetas (Godman & Salvin, [1887])
- Aubergina alda (Hewitson, 1868)
- Aubergina hesychia (Godman & Salvin, [1887])
