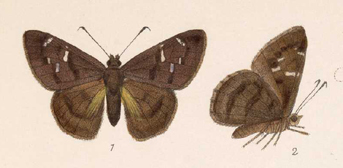

Scientific classification
- Kingdom: Animalia
- Phylum: Arthropoda
- Class: Insecta
- Order: Lepidoptera
- Family: Hesperiidae
- Genus: Cogia
- Species: C. cajeta

Binomial name
- Cogia cajeta (Herrich-Schäffer, 1869)

Synonyms
- Eudamus cajeta Herrich-Schäffer, 1869; Thorybes thedea Dyar, 1912; Cogia eluina Godman & Salvin, [1894]

= Cogia cajeta =

Yellow-haired skipper

Species of butterfly

Cogia cajeta, the yellow-haired skipper, is a species of butterfly of the family Hesperiidae. Subspecies cajeta is found in Mexico in southern Veracruz, eastern Oaxaca, Tabasco and north-eastern Chiapas. Subspecies eluina is found from Jalisco and the Yucatan Peninsula south to Costa Rica.

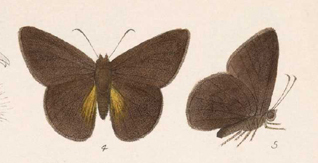

== Subspecies ==
- Cogia cajeta cajeta (Mexico)
- Cogia cajeta eluina (Mexico, Guatemala, Nicaragua)
