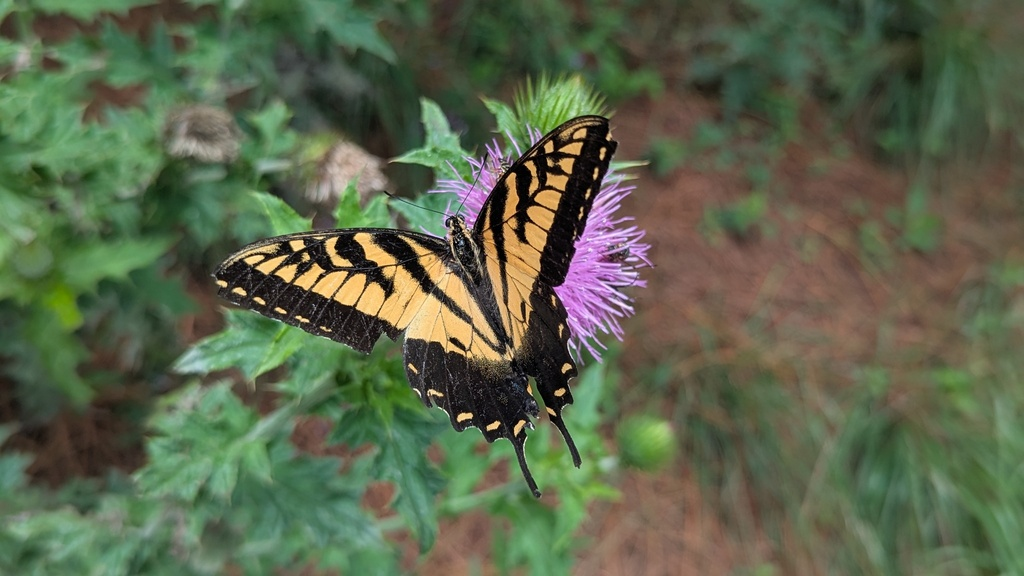
- Papilio alexiares garcia

Scientific classification
- Kingdom: Animalia
- Phylum: Arthropoda
- Clade: Pancrustacea
- Class: Insecta
- Order: Lepidoptera
- Family: Papilionidae
- Genus: Papilio
- Species: P. alexiares

Binomial name
- Papilio alexiares Höpffer, 1866

= Papilio alexiares =

Species of butterfly

Papilio alexiares, the Mexican tiger swallowtail, is a species of swallowtail butterfly from the genus Papilio that is found in Mexico and southern Texas.

== Subspecies ==
- Papilio alexiares alexiares (east-central Mexico)
- Papilio alexiares garcia Rothschild & Jordan, 1906 north-eastern Mexico, western Texas

== Taxonomy ==
It is sometimes listed as a subspecies of Papilio glaucus.
