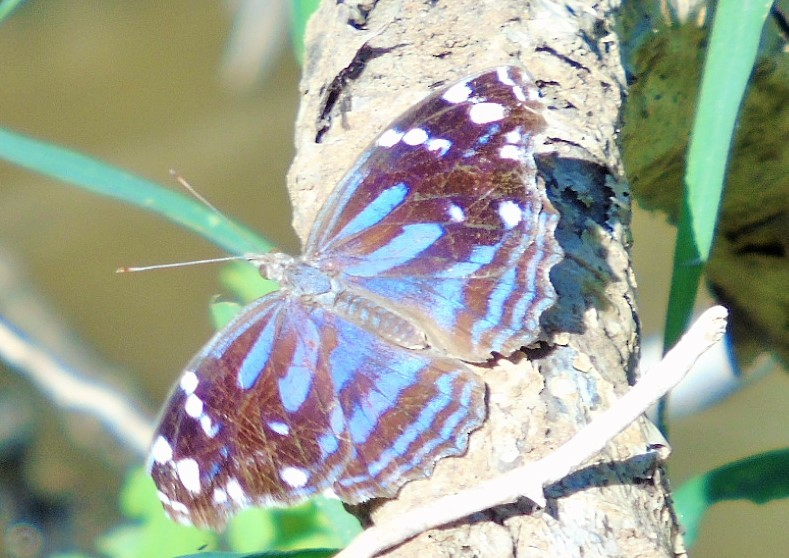

Scientific classification
- Kingdom: Animalia
- Phylum: Arthropoda
- Clade: Pancrustacea
- Class: Insecta
- Order: Lepidoptera
- Family: Nymphalidae
- Genus: Myscelia
- Species: M. cyananthe

Binomial name
- Myscelia cyananthe (C. Felder & R. Felder, 1867)

= Myscelia cyananthe =

Species of butterfly

Myscelia cyananthe, the blackened bluewing, is a species of tropical brushfoot in the butterfly family Nymphalidae. It is found in North America.

== Subspecies ==
These three subspecies belong to the species Myscelia cyananthe:

- Myscelia cyananthe cyananthe
- Myscelia cyananthe skinneri Mengel, 1894
- Myscelia cyananthe streckeri Skinner, 1889
