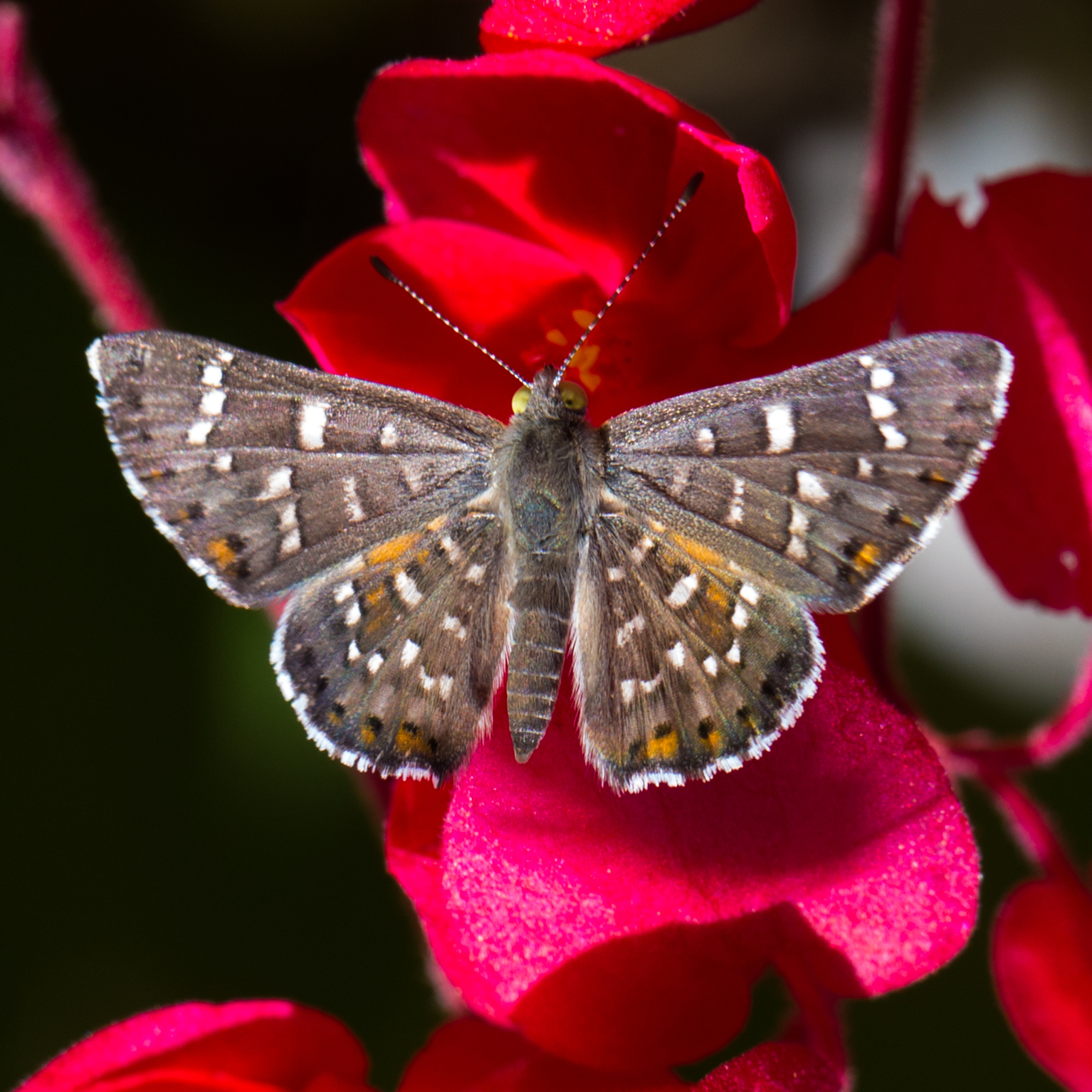

Scientific classification
- Domain: Eukaryota
- Kingdom: Animalia
- Phylum: Arthropoda
- Class: Insecta
- Order: Lepidoptera
- Family: Riodinidae
- Tribe: Emesidini
- Genus: Apodemia
- Species: A. hepburni

Binomial name
- Apodemia hepburni Godman & Salvin, 1886

= Apodemia hepburni =

Species of butterfly

Apodemia hepburni, or Hepburn's metalmark, is a species of metalmark in the family of butterflies known as Riodinidae. It is found in North America.

The MONA or Hodges number for Apodemia hepburni is 4404.
