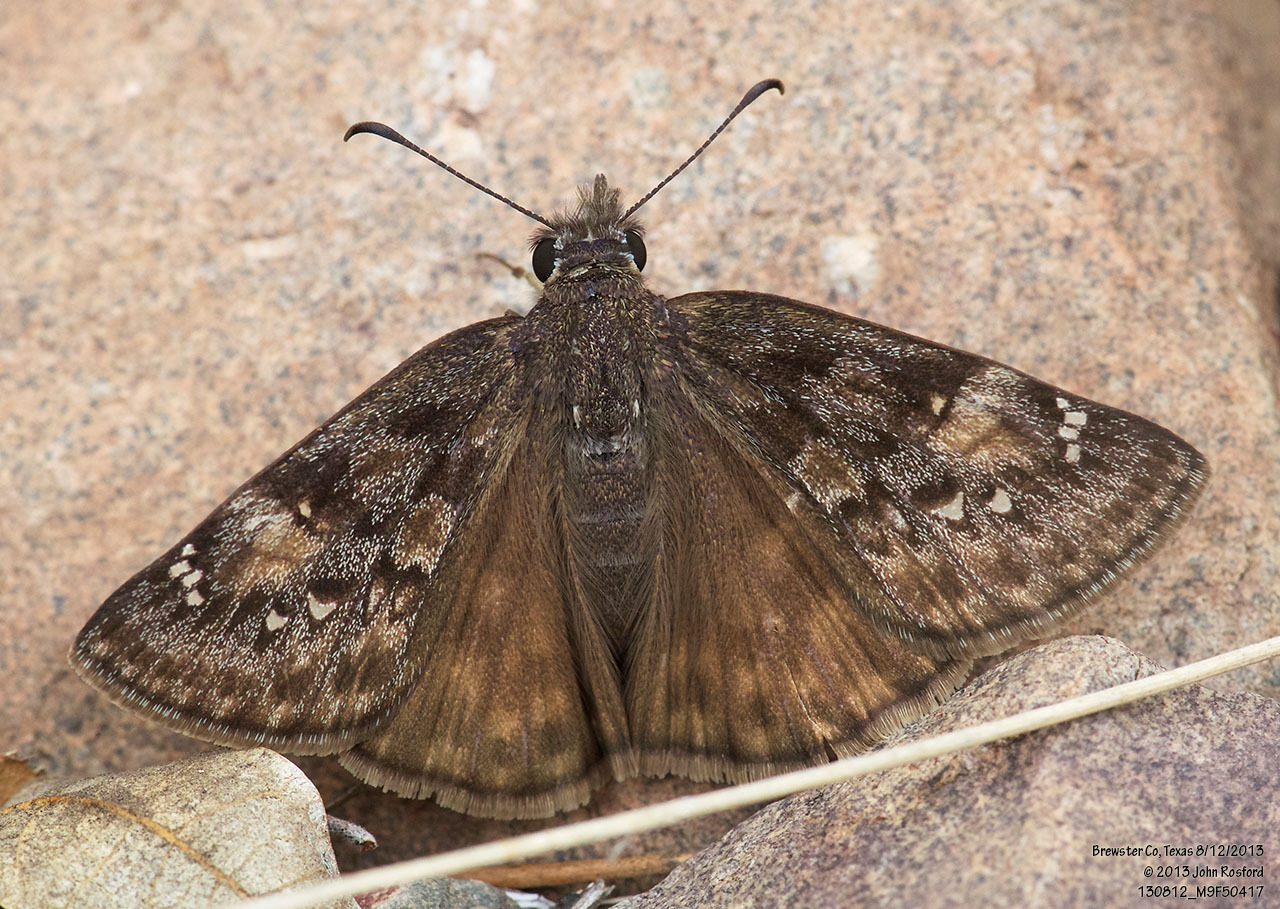

Scientific classification
- Domain: Eukaryota
- Kingdom: Animalia
- Phylum: Arthropoda
- Class: Insecta
- Order: Lepidoptera
- Family: Hesperiidae
- Genus: Erynnis
- Species: E. meridianus

Binomial name
- Erynnis meridianus E. Bell, 1927

= Erynnis meridianus =

Species of butterfly

Erynnis meridianus, the meridian duskywing, is a species of spread-wing skipper in the butterfly family Hesperiidae. It is found in Central America and North America.

== Subspecies ==
These two subspecies belong to the species Erynnis meridianus:

- Erynnis meridianus fieldi Burns, 1964^{c g}
- Erynnis meridianus meridianus E. Bell, 1927^{i g}

Data sources: i = ITIS, c = Catalogue of Life, g = GBIF, b = Bugguide.net
