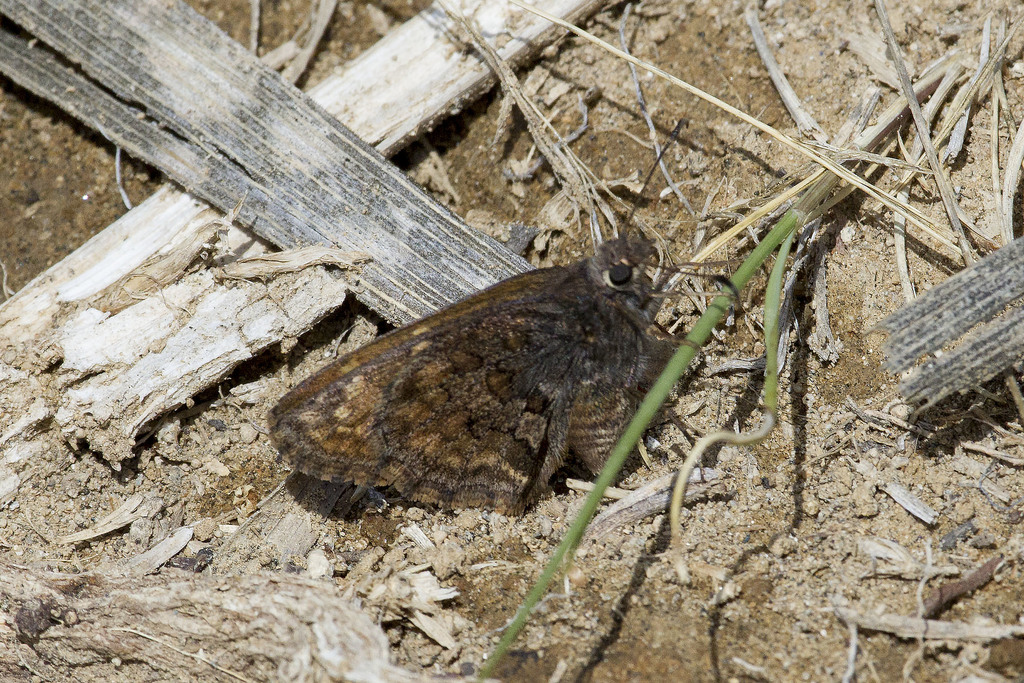

Scientific classification
- Kingdom: Animalia
- Phylum: Arthropoda
- Class: Insecta
- Order: Lepidoptera
- Family: Hesperiidae
- Genus: Lobotractus
- Species: L. valeriana

Binomial name
- Lobotractus valeriana (Plötz, 1881)

Synonyms
- List: Codatractus mysie (Dyar, 1904); Eudamus valeriana Plötz, 1881; Thorybes mysie Dyar, 1904; Codatractus valeriana (Plötz, 1881)

= Lobotractus valeriana =

Species of butterfly

Lobotractus valeriana, the valeriana skipper, is a species of dicot skipper in the butterfly family Hesperiidae. It is found in Central America and North America.
