= Chlosyne definita =

- Chlosyne definita

Scientific classification
- Domain: Eukaryota
- Kingdom: Animalia
- Phylum: Arthropoda
- Class: Insecta
- Order: Lepidoptera
- Family: Nymphalidae
- Genus: Chlosyne
- Species: C. definita

Binomial name
- Chlosyne definita (E. Aaron, 1885)

Species of butterfly

Chlosyne definita, known generally as the definite patch or definite checkerspot, is a species of checkerspot in the family Nymphalidae. It is found in North America.

The MONA or Hodges number for Chlosyne definita is 4500.

== Subspecies ==
- Chlosyne definita anastasia (Hemming, 1934)
- Chlosyne definita definita (E. Aaron, 1885)
