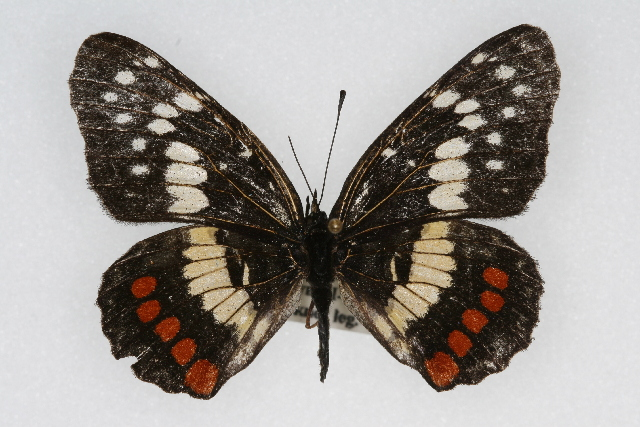
- Chlosyne marina eumeda

Scientific classification
- Domain: Eukaryota
- Kingdom: Animalia
- Phylum: Arthropoda
- Class: Insecta
- Order: Lepidoptera
- Family: Nymphalidae
- Genus: Chlosyne
- Species: C. marina

Binomial name
- Chlosyne marina (Geyer, 1837)

Synonyms
- Chlosyne eumeda (Godman & Salvin, 1894); Araschnia marina Geyer, 1837; Synchloe marina; Synchloe hylaeus Godman & Salvin, 1894; Synchloe melitaeoides C. & R. Felder, [1867]; Synchloe eumeda Godman & Salvin, 1894; Synchloe dryope Godman & Salvin, 1894; Chlosyne fasciata Röber, [1914]

= Chlosyne marina =

Species of butterfly

Chlosyne marina, the red-spotted patch or marina checkerspot, is a butterfly of the family Nymphalidae. It is found in Mexico. Rare strays can be found as far north as southern Arizona and southern Texas.

The wingspan is 33–35 mm. Adults feed on flower nectar.

== Subspecies ==
- Chlosyne marina marina (Mexico)
- Chlosyne marina melitaeoides (C. & R. Felder, 1867) (Mexico)
- Chlosyne marina eumeda (Godman & Salvin, 1894) (Mexico)
