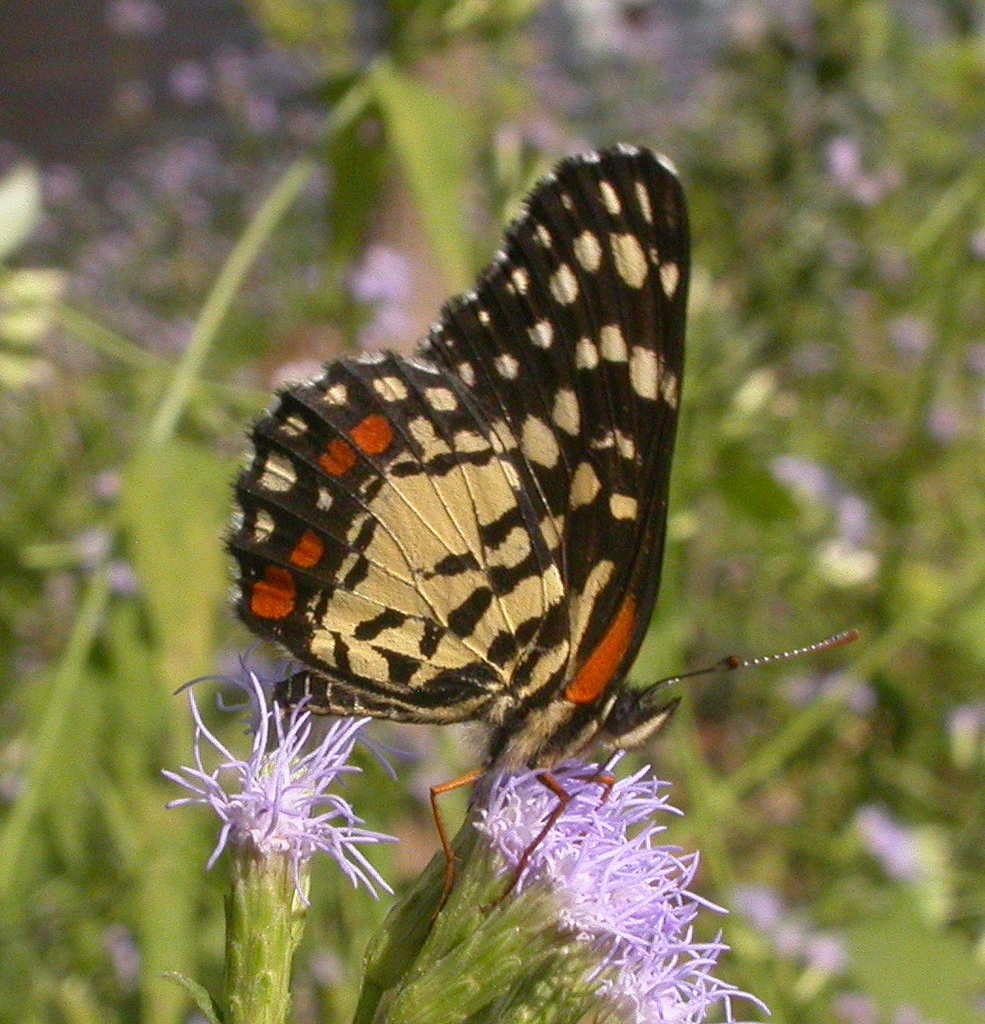

Scientific classification
- Domain: Eukaryota
- Kingdom: Animalia
- Phylum: Arthropoda
- Class: Insecta
- Order: Lepidoptera
- Family: Nymphalidae
- Subtribe: Chlosynina
- Genus: Chlosyne
- Species: C. melitaeoides

Binomial name
- Chlosyne melitaeoides (C. Felder & R. Felder, 1867)

= Chlosyne melitaeoides =

Species of butterfly

Chlosyne melitaeoides, the red-spotted patch, is a species of crescents, checkerspots, anglewings, etc. in the butterfly family Nymphalidae.

The MONA or Hodges number for Chlosyne melitaeoides is 4501.1.
