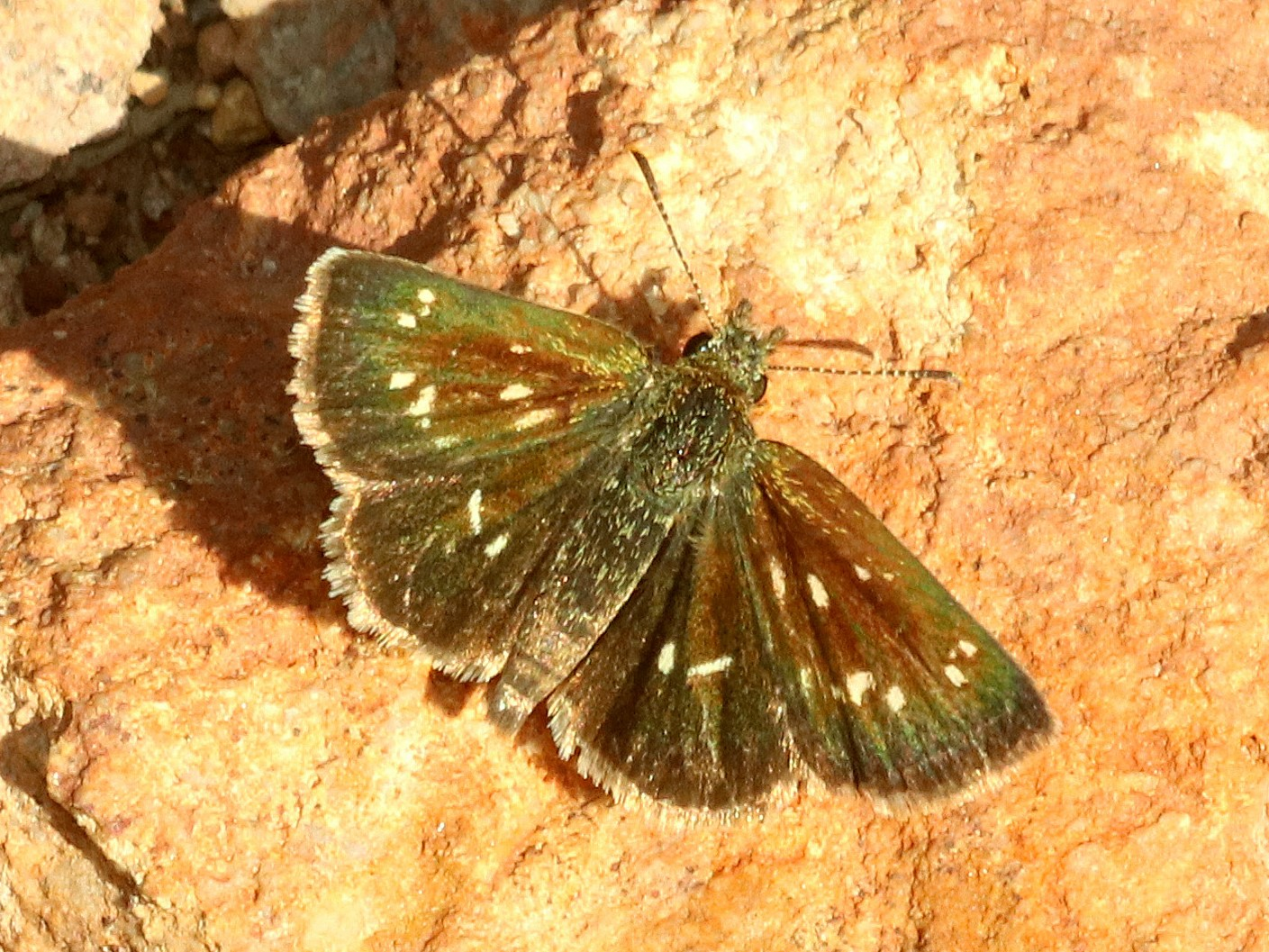

Scientific classification
- Kingdom: Animalia
- Phylum: Arthropoda
- Clade: Pancrustacea
- Class: Insecta
- Order: Lepidoptera
- Family: Hesperiidae
- Genus: Piruna
- Species: P. aea

Binomial name
- Piruna aea (Dyar, 1912)

Synonyms
- Piruna cingo Evans, 1955

= Piruna aea =

Species of butterfly

Piruna aea, the many-spotted skipperling, is a species of intermediate skipper in the butterfly family Hesperiidae. It is found in Central America and North America.

== Subspecies ==
These two subspecies belong to the species Piruna aea:

- Piruna aea aea
- Piruna aea mexicana H. Freeman, 1979
