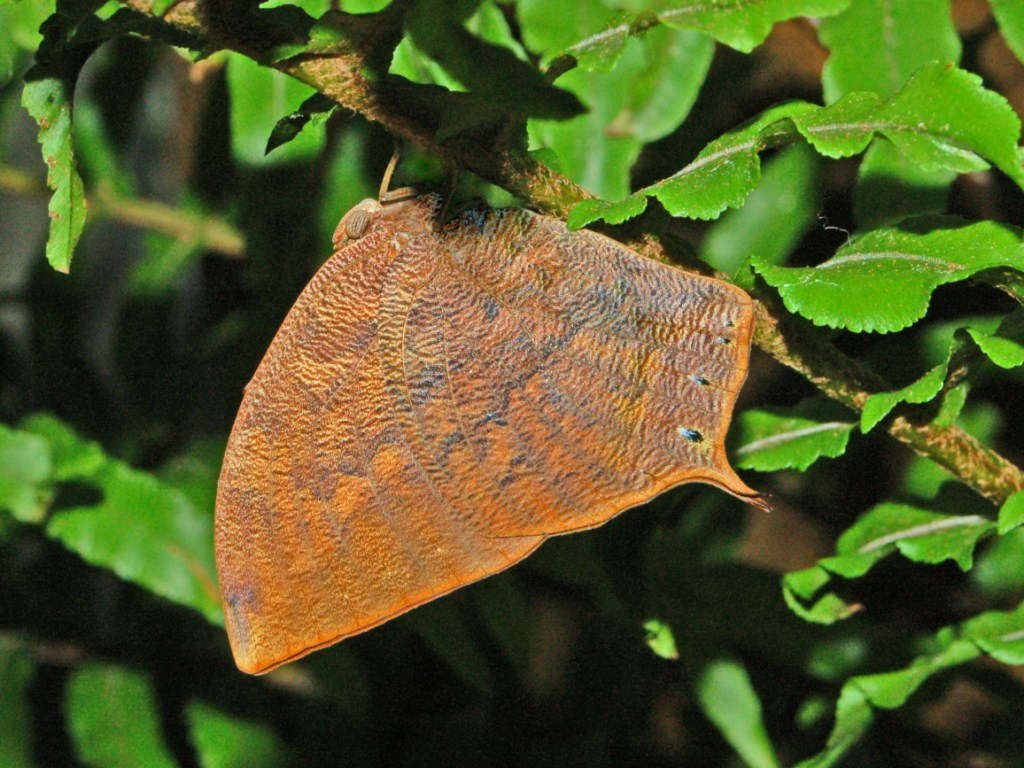
- Ventral view

Scientific classification
- Kingdom: Animalia
- Phylum: Arthropoda
- Clade: Pancrustacea
- Class: Insecta
- Order: Lepidoptera
- Family: Nymphalidae
- Genus: Fountainea
- Species: F. nobilis

Binomial name
- Fountainea nobilis (Bates, 1864)

Synonyms
- Anaea nobilis Godman & Salvin, 1884; Paphia nobilis Bates, 1864; Nymphalis titan C. & R. Felder, [1867]

= Fountainea nobilis =

Species of butterfly

Fountainea nobilis, the noble leafwing, is a species of Neotropical butterfly belonging to the family Nymphalidae, Charaxinae subfamily.

== Description ==
Fountainea nobilis is a quite rare "leaf butterfly". The dorsal sides of the upperwings are reddish with dark brown edges. In the females the dorsal sides are usually brown, with clearer edges. On the hindwings there are a few small white and black eyespots. The undersides mimic dead leaves, ranging from pale brown to grey.

== Distribution ==
Fountainea nobilis can be found from Southern Mexico (south-western Chiapas) to Colombia, Venezuela and Peru.

== Subspecies ==
- F. n. nobilis - Guatemala
- F. n. titan (C. & R. Felder, [1867]) - Costa Rica, Colombia, Peru
- F. n. caudata (Röber, 1916) - Colombia
- F. n. peralta (Hall, 1929) - Costa Rica
- F. n. rayoensis (Maza & Díaz, 1978) - Mexico (Oaxaca)
- F. n. romeroi (Descimon, 1988) – Venezuela
