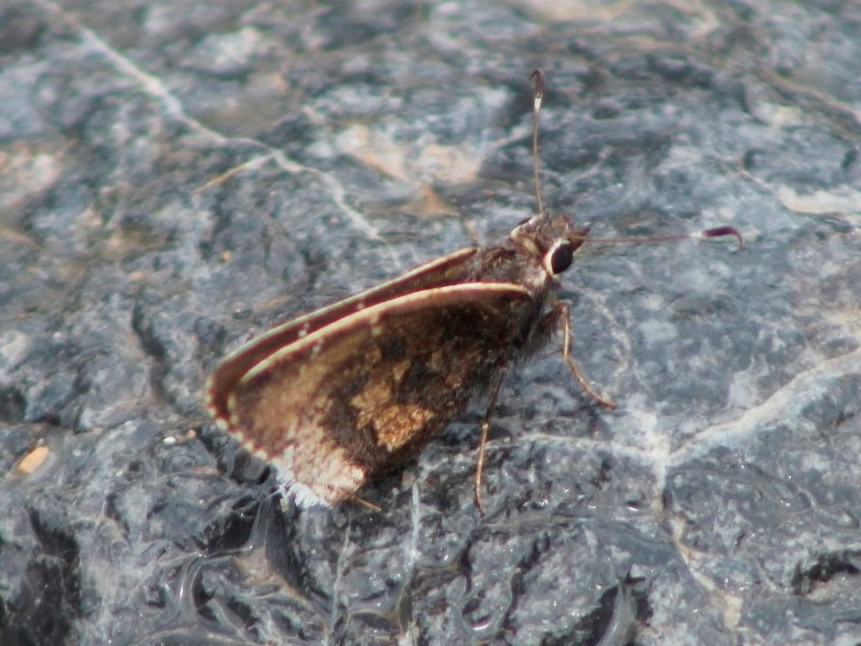

Scientific classification
- Kingdom: Animalia
- Phylum: Arthropoda
- Class: Insecta
- Order: Lepidoptera
- Family: Hesperiidae
- Genus: Cogia
- Species: C. caicus

Binomial name
- Cogia caicus (Herrich-Schäffer, 1869)

= Cogia caicus =

Species of butterfly

Cogia caicus, known generally as the gold-costa skipper or caicus skipper, is a species of dicot skipper in the butterfly family Hesperiidae.

== Subspecies ==
These two subspecies belong to the species Cogia caicus:

- Cogia caicus caicus (Herrich-Schäffer, 1869)
- Cogia caicus moschus (W. H. Edwards, 1882)
