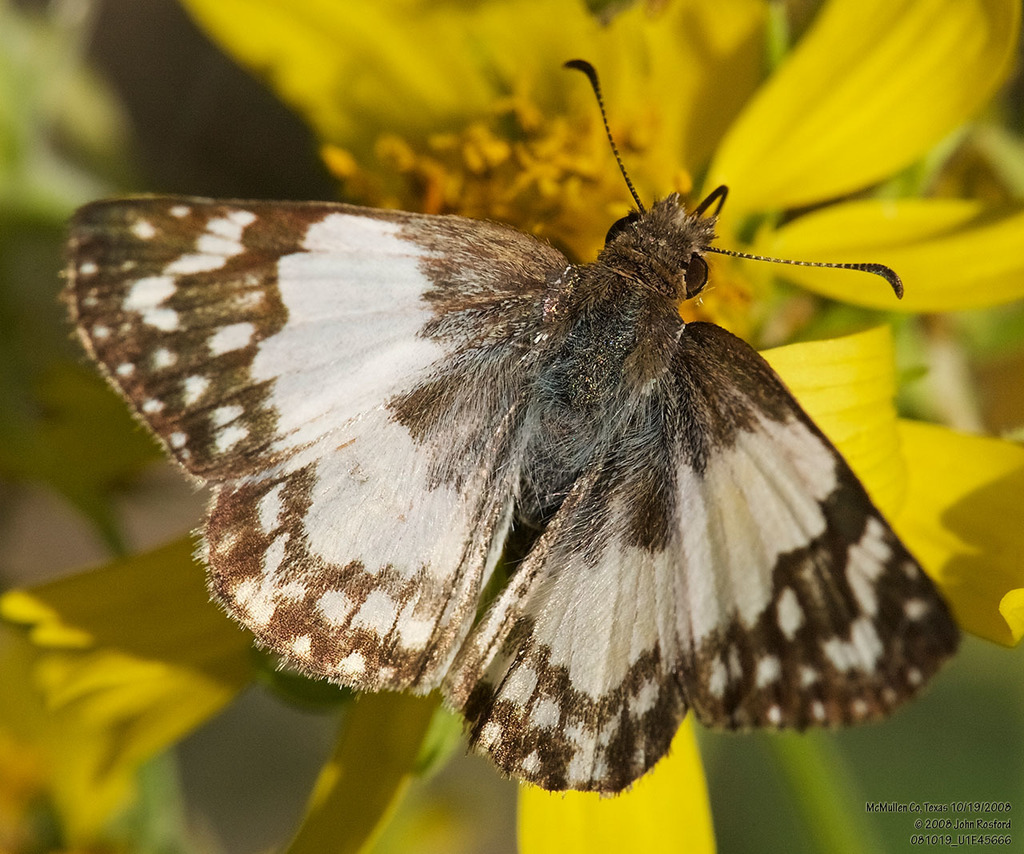

Scientific classification
- Kingdom: Animalia
- Phylum: Arthropoda
- Clade: Pancrustacea
- Class: Insecta
- Order: Lepidoptera
- Family: Hesperiidae
- Genus: Heliopyrgus
- Species: H. sublinea

Binomial name
- Heliopyrgus sublinea (Schaus, 1902)

= Heliopyrgus sublinea =

Species of butterfly

Heliopyrgus sublinea, the east-Mexican white-skipper, is a species of spread-wing skipper in the butterfly family Hesperiidae.
