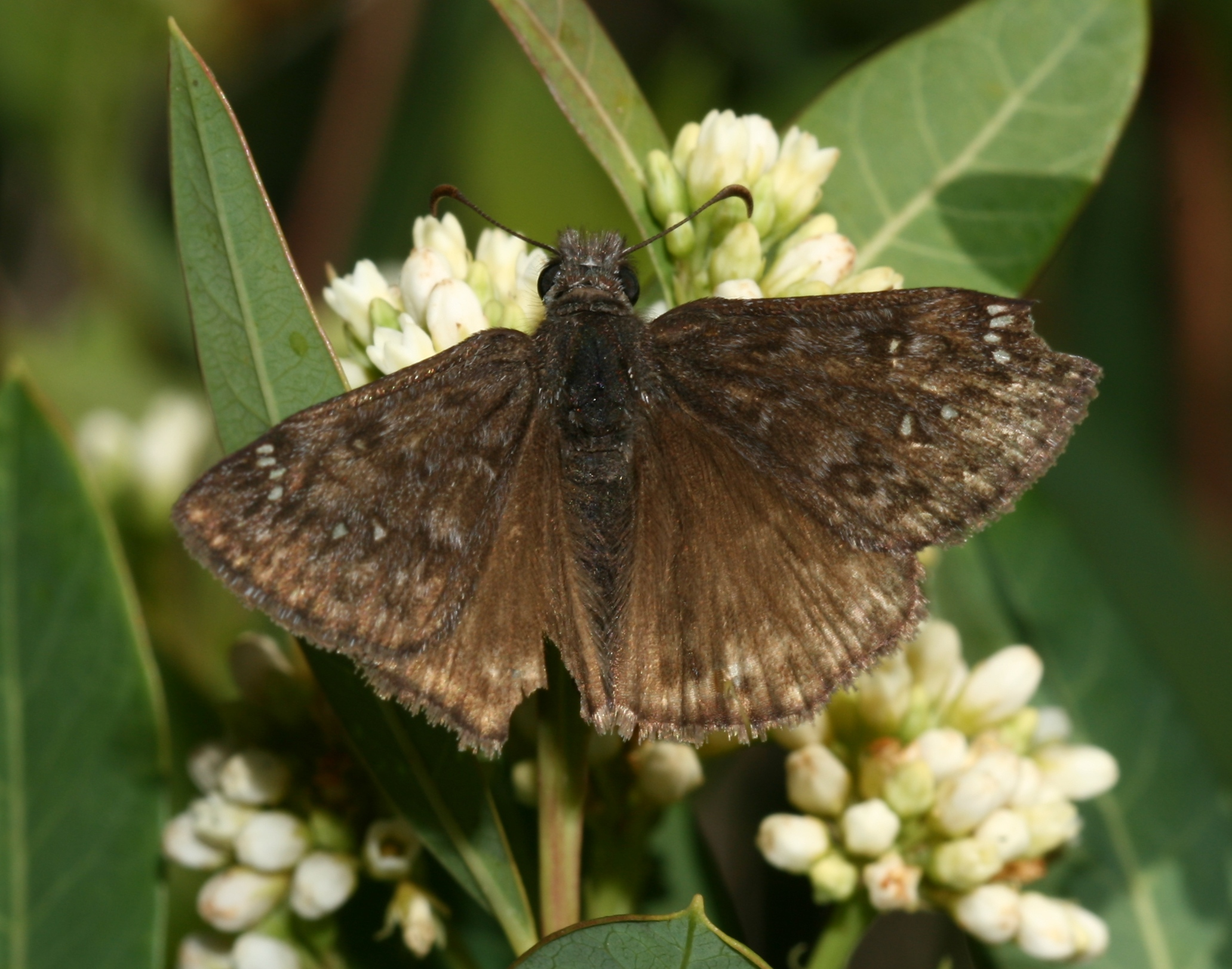

Scientific classification
- Kingdom: Animalia
- Phylum: Arthropoda
- Clade: Pancrustacea
- Class: Insecta
- Order: Lepidoptera
- Family: Hesperiidae
- Genus: Erynnis
- Species: E. propertius

Binomial name
- Erynnis propertius (Scudder & Burgess, 1870)

Synonyms
- Nisoniades propertius Scudder & Burgess, 1870; Nisoniades tibullus Scudder & Burgess, 1870; Thanaos propertius Lintner, 1881

= Erynnis propertius =

Species of butterfly

Erynnis propertius, commonly known as Propertius duskywing, is a species of butterfly in the family Hesperiidae. Propertius duskywings are members of the Pyrginae subfamily. It is found in along the west coast of North America from southern British Columbia south along the Pacific Slope to Baja California Norte. It is one of the most commonly seen skippers in California.

The species was formally described and named by entomologists Samuel Hubbard Scudder and Edward Burgess in 1870. E. propertius was occasionally recorded under different names that are now considered synonymous. These include: Nisoniades propertius, Nisoniades tibullus, and Thanaos propertius.

Larvae E. propertius feed on oaks, particularly Garry oak (Quercus garryana) at the northern edge of the range. Adults E. propertius drink nectar from wildflowers and sometimes feed on damp soil for minerals.

E. propertius is known for its close association with oak woodland habitats and localized populations with fragmented oak ecosystems.

== Physical description ==
E. propertius are physically characterized as small-sized skipper butterflies that have stout bodies, relatively small wings, and hooked antenna tips. E. propertius has rapid, darting flight and mottled brown wing coloration that provides camouflage against bark and leaf litter in oak woodland habitats. The wingspan is 35–45 mm.

Adult E. propertius are dark brown- grayish with some pale spots on the forewings and more uniformly dusky hindwings. Females are typically slightly larger and paler than males.

E. propertius share similar appearance with duskywing Erynnis tristis and Erynnis funeralis with all three species having dark-colored dorsal wings. E. propertius can be differentiated from E. tristis and E. funeralis by their grizzled appearance, the presence of two subapical spots on the ventral hindwing, and lack of white hindwing fringe.

Larvae E. propertius vary by instar. At first instar, caterpillars are typically pale cream or greenish with dark head capsules, while later instars become more green or brown.

== Geographic range ==
The distribution of E. propertius aligned with its host, Garry oak, primarily in southwestern British Columbia, Canada; the southern and northern Puget Sound and the eastern slopes of the Cascade Mountains in Washington; western Oregon; and northwestern California. In Washington, E. propertius exists only in small, isolated populations. It has also been observed in Mason County, San Juan County, Scamaria County, and Thurston County.

E. propertius is frequently found in oak-dominated habitats, such as open woodlands, forest edges, and savanna habitats that contain Garry oak. It is closely associated with Quercus garryana ecosystems in British Colombia, which are naturally fragmented and have limited distribution. The scattered presence of these habitats has resulted in limited local population structure and interpopulation dispersal. In the southern part of its range, E. propertius feeds on other oak species.

== Habitat ==
E. propertius are common in their habitat of open oak woodlands and forest openings, but are absent in the deserts or the hot central valleys. The Garry oak (Quercus garryana) is the obligate host of E. propertius whose larvae feed on the oak's leaves. A primary nectar source for E. propertius is the common camas (Camassia quamash).

E. propertius inhabits low-elevation (up to 2000 feet) open-canopied oak woodlands and savannas. In western Washington, oak forests are sparse and are declining. Research is needed to determine the specific requirements of the Garry oak understory environment for overwintering and pupal development of this species. The leaf litter layer is crucial for protecting the larvae during hibernation.

== Life cycle ==
E. propertius go through one life cycle per year. Unlike some other butterfly species that migrate, E. propertius usually stay within a hundred meters of their birthplace. These butterflies stay in the same site all year, whether they are eggs, larvae, pupae, or adult butterflies.

Larvae feed on the leaves of Garry oaks. They conceal themselves in silken nests and primarily forage at night. Their large cocoons made of folded oak leaves fall to the ground during winter, where they overwinter as sixth instar caterpillars. The larvae pupate in early spring in the oak leaf nest. Adult E. propertius typically emerge from the pupae during April and May. The males come out first, then the females. Late-season individuals are primarily female.

== Mating and reproduction ==
Male E. propertius perch on low-lying plants to find mates, then quickly fly out to observe passing butterflies. Once a male detects female butterflies, it will begin courtship behavior. If a male spots another male, it will engage in territorial defense behavior.

Female E. propertius fly slowly and hover above the host plant to find a place to lay their eggs. They then curve their abdomen to glue a single egg onto the leaf. This method of laying solitary eggs is an evolutionary strategy designed to maximize the survival rate of the caterpillars.

== Social behaviors ==
Erynnis propertius is a highly solitary species. E. propertius larvae live alone in silken nests to forage and evade predators, as there is no cooperative feeding.

Adults are also primarily solitary. While adults may gather at shared nectar sources, they do not form a long-term social group. During mating periods, males typically perch on low vegetation while waiting for females to pass by. When another male enters the area, territorial interactions such as short-distance chases and upward spiraling flight may occur. These behaviors are seen as mate competition and territorial defense.

== Threats and conservation ==
Erynnis propertius is considered relatively stable across most of its range. However, it remains vulnerable to habitat loss as it strongly depends on oak forest and savanna ecosystems. Climate change may also affect the long-term distribution of E. propertius. While studies have shown that larval development and host plant growth are not well-matched at the northern edge of its range, its northward expansion is limited by the lack of suitable oak host plants outside its existing range. This may reduce the species’ ability to adapt to changes in its range due to rising temperatures. One major conservation challenge is the destruction of oak forest and savanna habitats by invasive species. Non-native species such as shrubs and grasses compete for resources and the invasion of native trees such as Douglas fir reduce the open woodland. Habitat restoration action include using herbicides, mechanically restore native prairie, removing invasive trees, and seeding native oak woodland.
