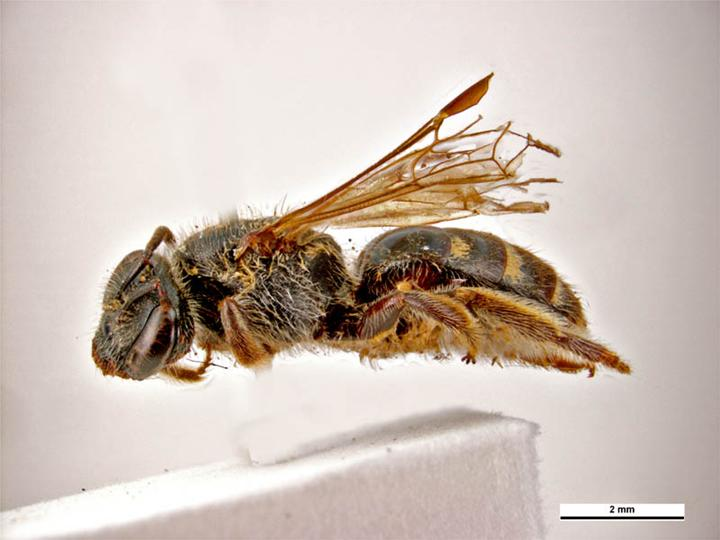
- Female

Scientific classification
- Kingdom: Animalia
- Phylum: Arthropoda
- Clade: Pancrustacea
- Class: Insecta
- Order: Hymenoptera
- Family: Halictidae
- Genus: Lasioglossum
- Species: L. gilesi

Binomial name
- Lasioglossum gilesi (Cockerell, 1905)

Synonyms
- Halictus gilesi Cockerell, 1905; Halictus circumdatus Cockerell, 1914; Halictus evasus Cockerell, 1930; Halictus milleri Rayment, 1935

= Lasioglossum gilesi =

Species of bee

Lasioglossum gilesi, or Lasioglossum (Chilalictus) gilesi, is a species of bee in the family Halictidae and subfamily Halictinae. It is endemic to Australia. It was described by British-American entomologist Theodore Dru Alison Cockerell in 1905.

== Description ==
Female body length is about 8 mm. Integumental colouration is mainly black.

== Distribution and habitat ==
The species occurs in south-eastern Australia. Type localities include Rutherglen and Bayswater in Victoria, and Coolangatta in south-eastern Queensland.

== Behaviour ==
The adults are flying mellivores that nest gregariously in soil. Flowering plants visited by the bees include Acacia, Angophora, Atalaya, Bauera, Borago, Brachyscome, Bursaria, Callistemon, Cassia, Cotoneaster, Daviesia, Dichopogon, Diplarrena, Eucalyptus, Exocarpos, Gladiolus, Hibbertia, Jacksonia, Juniperus, Lagunaria, Malva, Medicago, Melaleuca, Pultenaea, Schinus, Senecio and Thomasia species.

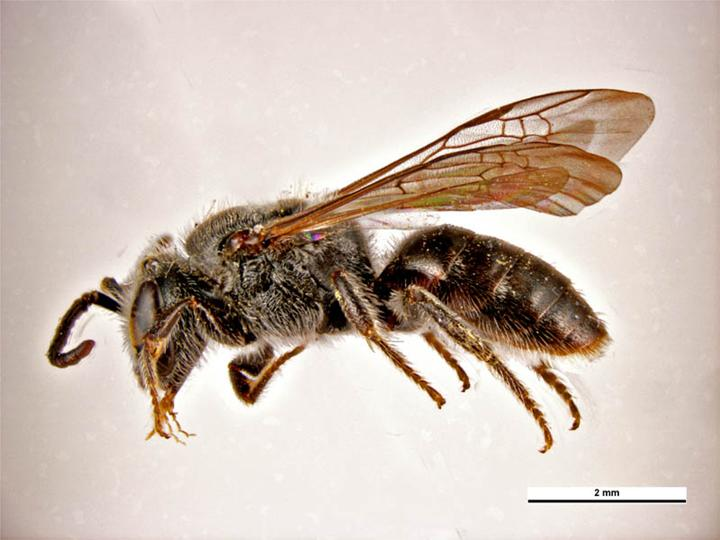
Male
