= Rock lily =

Rock lily is a common name for several plants and may refer to:

- Aquilegia canadensis, a regional common name from New Hampshire for the North American plant more often known as Canadian columbine
- Arthropodium cirratum, native to New Zealand
- Dendrobium speciosum, native to Australia
