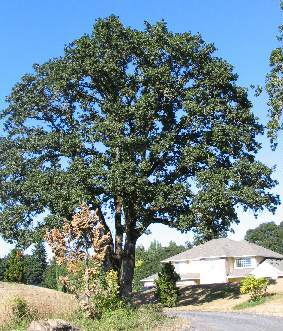
- Mature Oregon white oak
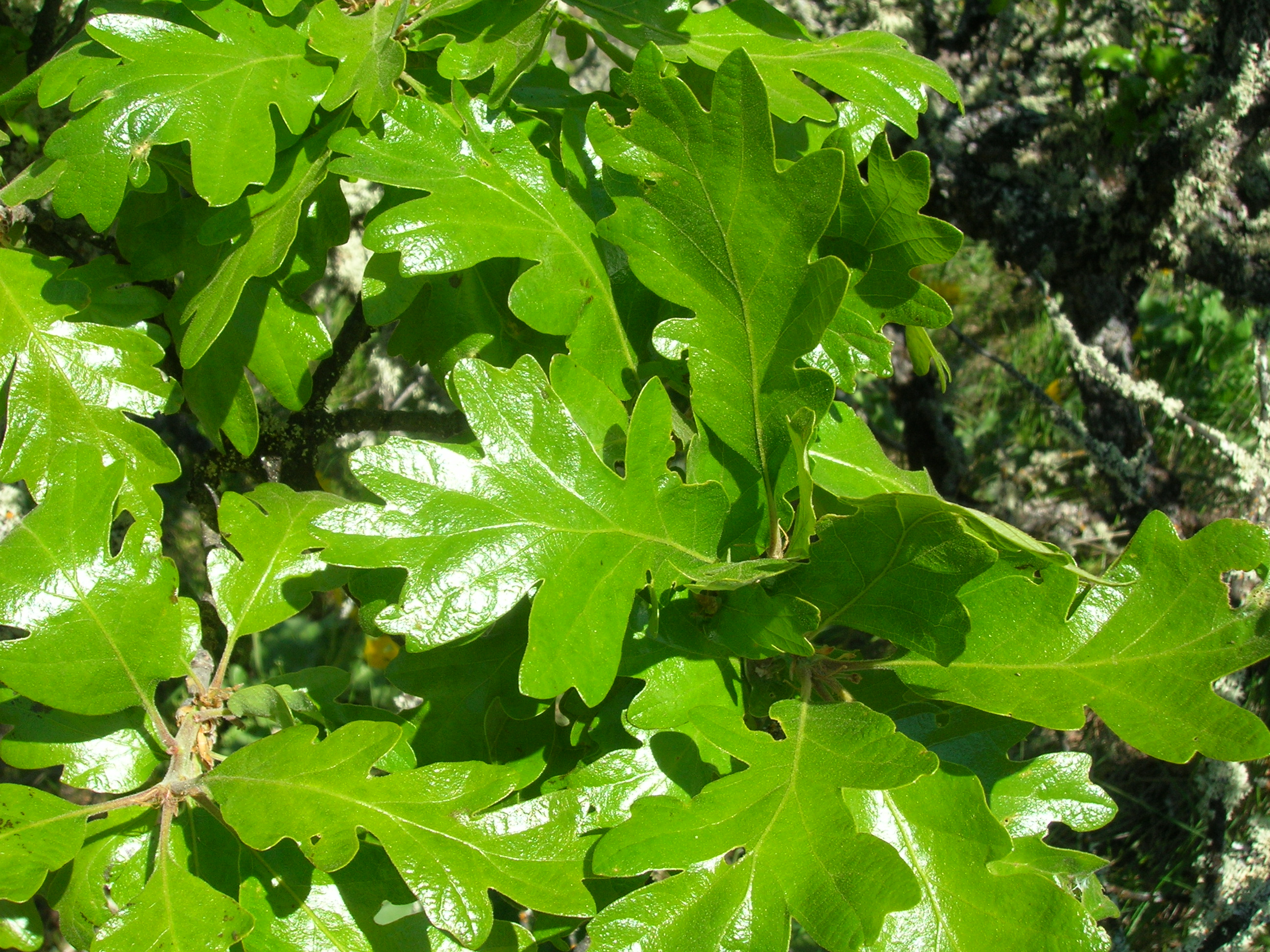

Conservation status
- Least Concern (IUCN 3.1)

Scientific classification
- Kingdom: Plantae
- Clade: Tracheophytes
- Clade: Angiosperms
- Clade: Eudicots
- Clade: Rosids
- Order: Fagales
- Family: Fagaceae
- Genus: Quercus
- Subgenus: Quercus subg. Quercus
- Section: Quercus sect. Quercus
- Species: Q. garryana

Binomial name
- Quercus garryana Douglas ex Hook.

Varieties
- Quercus garryana var. breweri (Engelm.) Jeps.; Quercus garryana var. garryana; Quercus garryana var. semota Jeps.
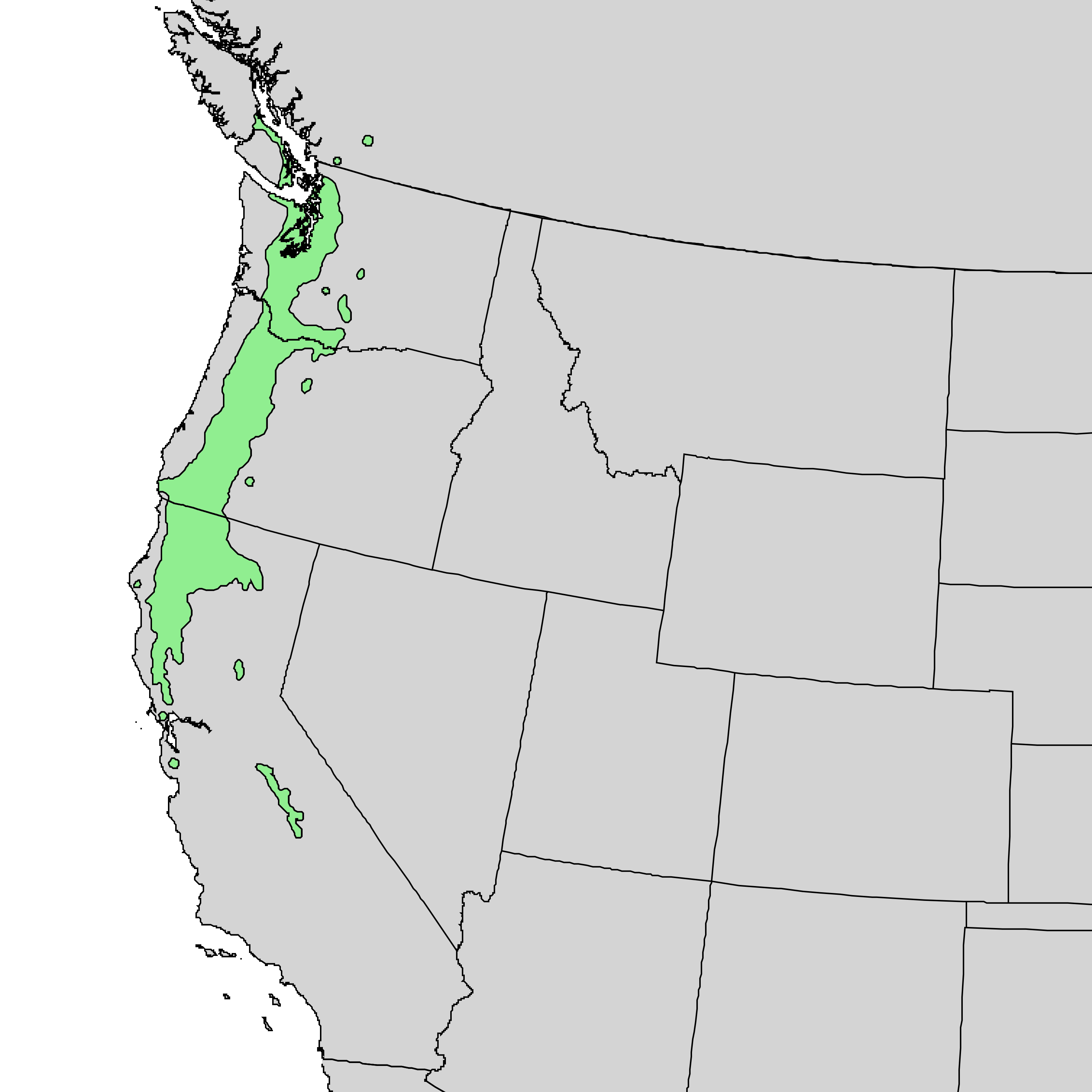
- Natural range

Synonyms
- List: synonyms of var. breweri: Quercus breweri Engelm.; Quercus garryana subsp. breweri (Engelm.) A.E.Murray; Quercus garryana var. fruticosa (Engelm.) Govaerts; Quercus lobata var. breweri (Engelm.) Wenz.; Quercus lobata subsp. fruticosa Engelm. synonyms of var. garryana: Quercus douglasii var. neaei (Liebm.) A.DC.; Quercus garryana var. jacobi (R.Br.ter) Zabel; Quercus jacobi R.Br.ter; Quercus neaei Liebm.; Quercus patula G.Hansen synonyms of var. semota: Quercus garryana subsp. semota (Jeps.) A.E.Murray; Quercus oerstediana R.Br.ter

= Quercus garryana =

Oregon white oak

Species of oak tree

Quercus garryana is an oak tree species found most commonly in the Pacific Northwest, with a range stretching from southern California to southwestern British Columbia. It is commonly known as the Garry oak, Oregon white oak or Oregon oak. It is named for Nicholas Garry, deputy governor of the Hudson's Bay Company.

== Description ==
Quercus garryana is typically of medium height, growing slowly to around 80 feet (24 metres) and occasionally as high as 100 ft (30 m), or in shrub form to 10 to 15 ft (3.0 to 4.6 m) tall. The trunks grow to 3 ft (0.91 m) thick, exceptionally 5 ft (2 m). The bark is gray and fissured. It has the characteristic oval profile of other oaks when solitary, but is also known to grow in groves close enough together that crowns may form a canopy. The leaves are deciduous, 2–6 in (5.1–15 cm) long and 1–3 in broad, with 3–7 deep lobes on each side, darker green on top and finely haired below. The flowers are catkins. The fruit a small acorn (Note: These are often abundant in alternating years.) 3/4–1 in (19–25 mm) long, rarely 1 1/2 in, and 1/2–3/4 in (13–19 mm) broad, with shallow, scaly cups. Its fall color is unspectacular, with many trees turning plain brown.

The Oregon white oak is commonly found in the Willamette Valley hosting the mistletoe Phoradendron flavescens. It is also commonly found hosting galls created by wasps in the family Cynipidae. 'Oak apples', green or yellow ball of up to 5 cm in size, are the most spectacular. They are attached to the undersides of leaves. One common species responsible for these galls is Cynips maculipennis. Another common predator is the oak twig gall wasp (Bassettia ligni), which causes dead twigs and small branches, especially near the tips of branches. Its effects are cyclic, with successive years producing highly variable amounts of oak twig die-back. Other species create other galls on stems and leaves. Shapes vary from spheres to mushroom-shaped to pencil-shaped.

Individual specimens can grow to around 500 years in age, such as those on Sauvie Island near Portland, Oregon.

The genus name Quercus comes from Latin meaning "oak tree." The Garry Oak (Quercus garryana), also called Oregon white oak, ranges from British Columbia to California. The latin scientific name, Quercus garryana, was bestowed by Botanist David Douglas in the early 1800's to honor his friend, Nicholas Garry, an officer in the Hudson Bay Trading Company. The Garry oak (Quercus garryana) is one of 20 native oak species found on the Pacific Coast of Northern America, but the only native oak found in western Washington or British Columbia.

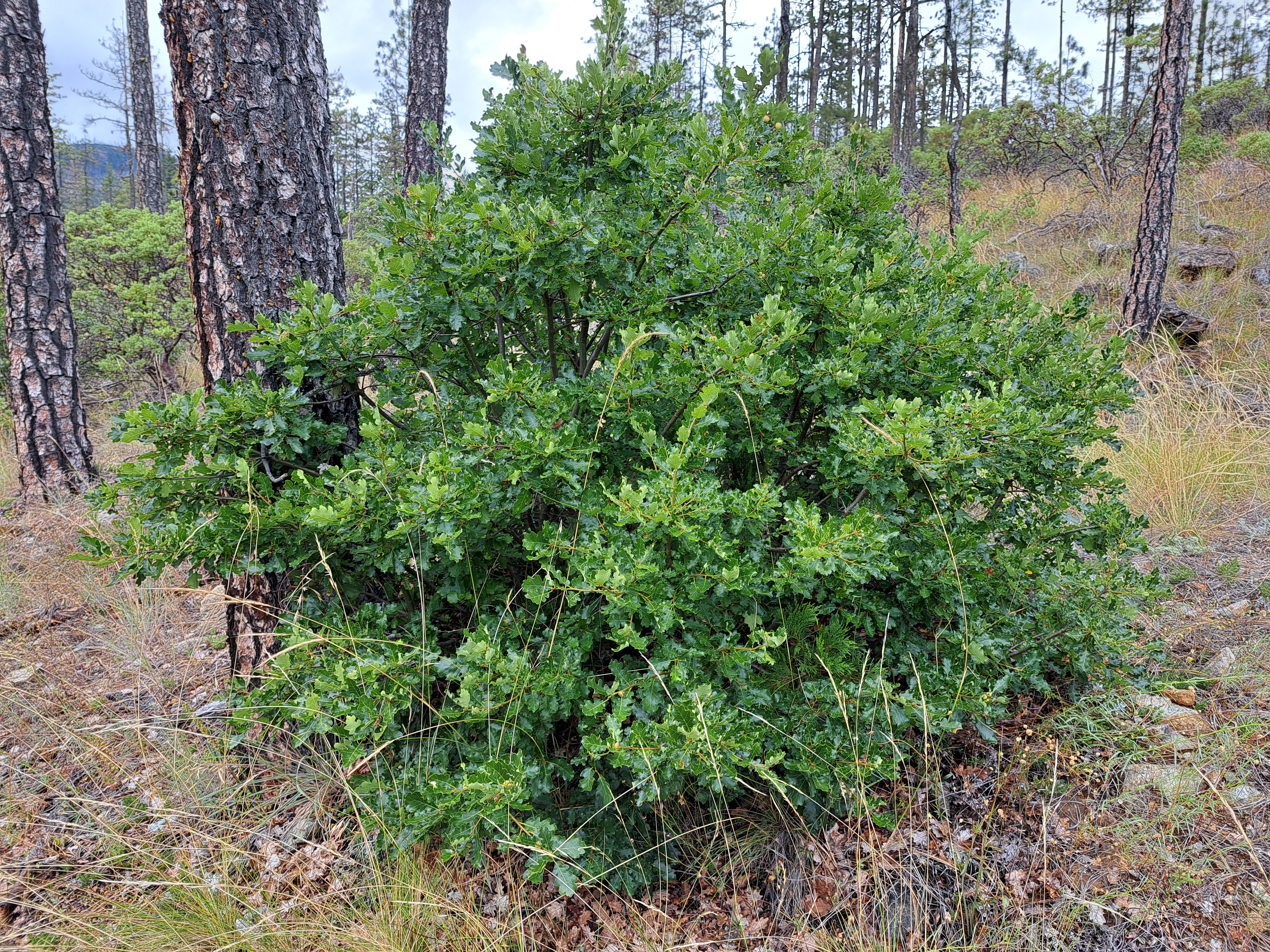
The shrub-like form of Oregon white oak (Quercus garryana var. breweri) growing in serpentine soils in southwest Oregon.

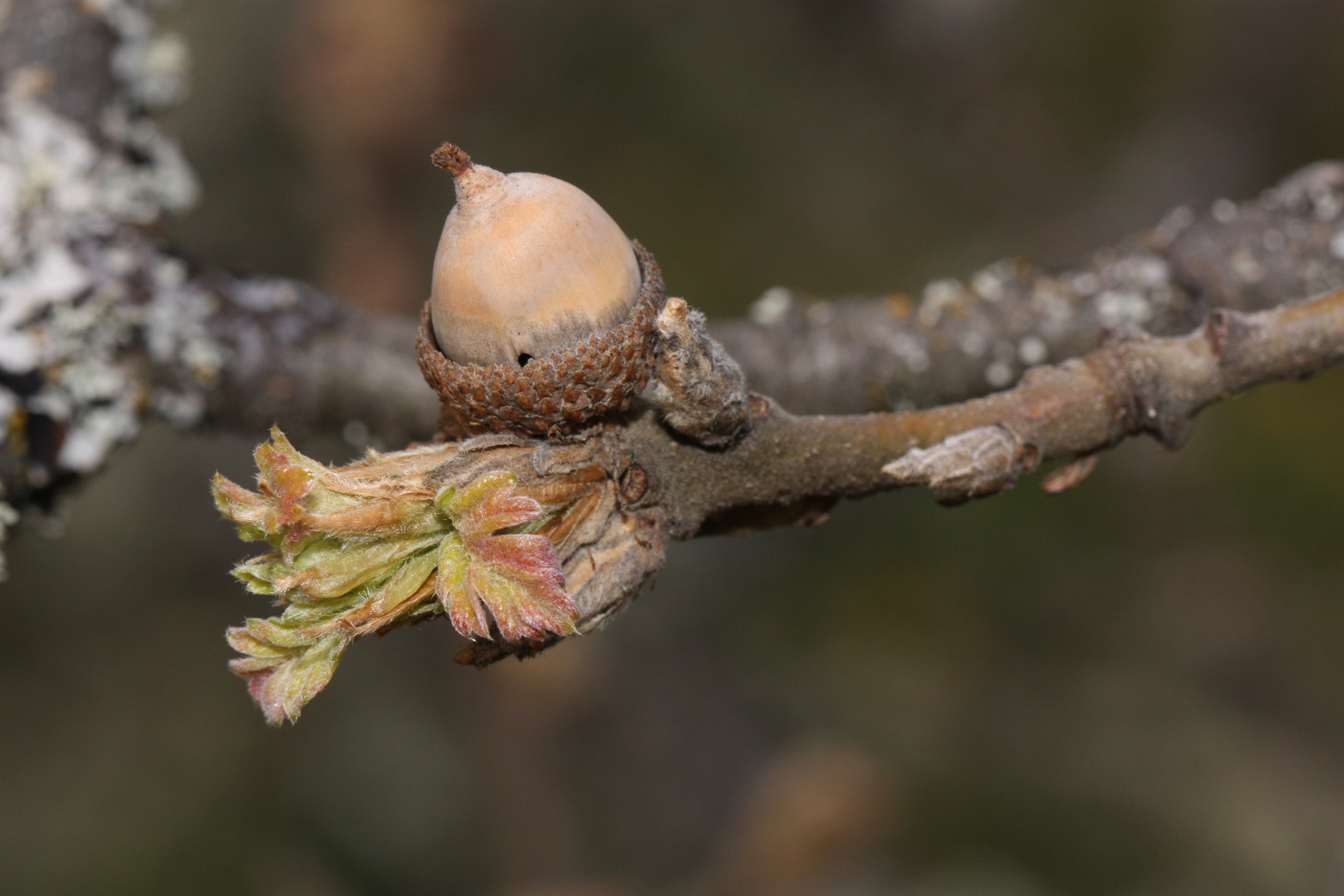
As the fruit matures, the involucre hardens and becomes a shallow receptacle that contains an acorn.

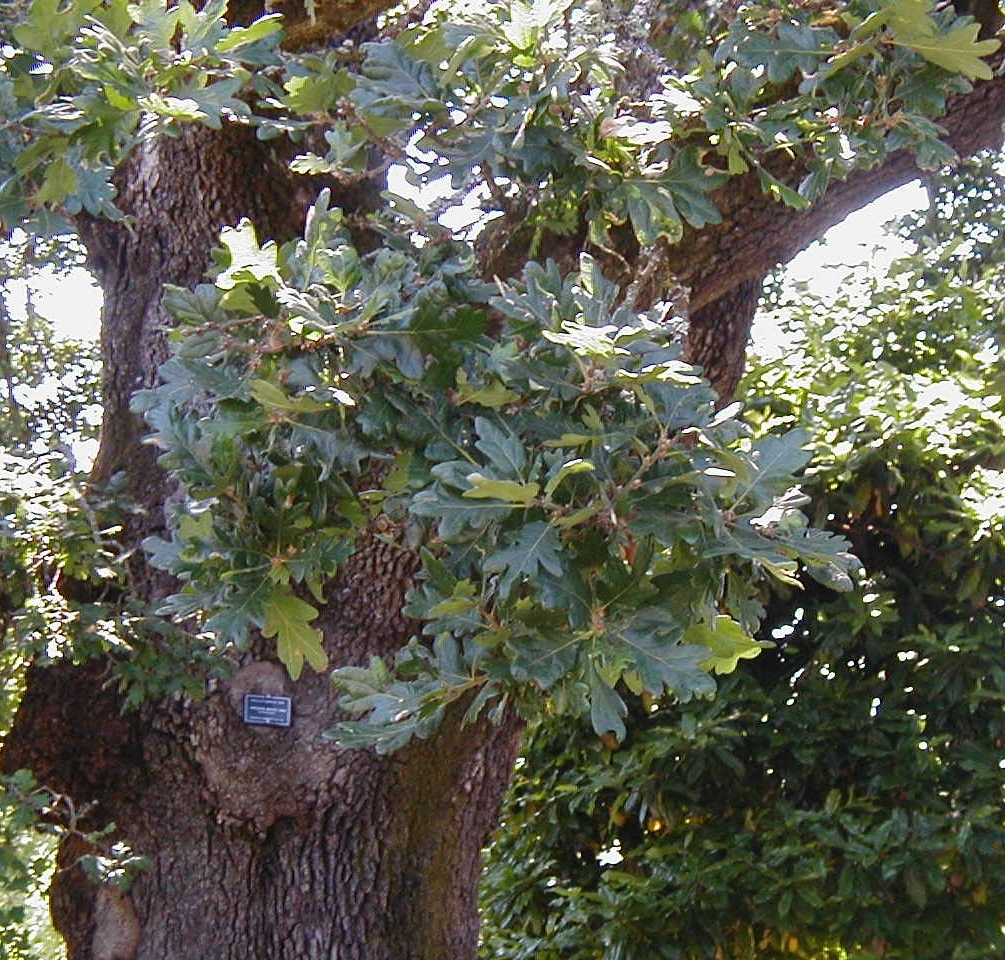
Oregon white oak leaves

== Taxonomy ==
=== Taxonomic history ===
David Douglas was the first non-native person to record the species. Quercus garryana is named after Nicholas Garry, who was deputy governor of the Hudson's Bay Company from 1822 to 1835 and a supporter of Douglas.

=== Varieties ===
There are three varieties of Garry oak:

- Quercus garryana var. garryana – tree to 65 (100) ft. British Columbia south along the Cascades to the California Coast Ranges.
- Quercus garryana var. breweri – shrub to 15 ft; leaves velvety underneath. Siskiyou Mountains.
- Quercus garryana var. semota – shrub to 15 ft; leaves not velvety underneath. Sierra Nevada.

== Distribution and habitat ==
It grows from sea level to an elevation of 690 ft (210 m) in the northern part of its range, and from 980 to 5,900 ft (300 to 1,800 m) in the south of the range in California.

In British Columbia, the Garry oak grows on the Gulf Islands and southeastern Vancouver Island, from west of Victoria along the east side of the island up to the Campbell River area. There are also small populations along the Fraser River on the British Columbia mainland. The northernmost population of Garry oak can be found just below 50°N on Savary Island, in the northern stretches of the Strait of Georgia. The Garry oak is the only oak native to British Columbia, and one of only two oaks (along with the bur oak) native to western Canada.

In Washington, the tree grows on the west side of the Cascade Range, particularly in the Puget Sound lowlands, the northeastern Olympic Peninsula, Whidbey Island, the Chehalis river valley, and the San Juan Islands. It also grows in the foothills of the southeastern Cascades and along the Columbia River Gorge.

In Oregon, the tree grows on the west side of the Cascade Range, primarily in the Willamette, Umpqua and Rogue river valleys, and along the Columbia River Gorge, as well as in canyons adjacent to the gorge.

In California, the garryana variety grows in the foothills of the Siskiyou and Klamath Mountains, the Coast Ranges of Northern California, and of the west slope of the Cascades. The semota variety grows in the Sierra Nevada and Coast Ranges as far south as Los Angeles County.

== Ecology ==
It is a drought-tolerant tree. Older specimens are often affected by heart rot.

The acorns are consumed by wildlife and livestock. David Douglas recorded that bears consumed them. The Garry oak is the obligate host plant of the butterfly Erynnis propertius in the northern third of its range.

In British Columbia, the Garry oak can be infested by three nonnative insects: the jumping gall wasp Neuroterus saltatorius, the oak leaf phylloxeran, and the spongy moth.

While the invasive plant disease commonly called sudden oak death attacks other Pacific Coast native oaks, it has not yet been found on the Oregon white oak. Most oak hosts of this disease are in the red oak group, while Oregon white oak is in the white oak group.

=== Quercus garryana woodlands ===
Oregon white oak is the only native oak species in British Columbia, Washington, and northern Oregon. In these areas, oak woodlands are seral, or early-successional; they depend on disturbance to avoid being overtaken by Douglas-fir (Pseudotsuga menziesii). The disturbance allowing oak to persist in an area that would otherwise succeed to coniferous forest was primarily fire. Natural wildfires are relatively common in the drier portions of the Pacific Northwest where Oregon white oak is found, but fire suppression has made such events much less common. In addition, tribal histories, soil surveys, and early settlers' records indicate that deliberate burning was widely practiced by the indigenous people of these areas. Fire perpetuated the grasslands that produced food sources such as camas, chocolate lily, bracken fern, and oak; and that provided grazing and easy hunting for deer and elk. Mature Oregon white oaks are fire-resistant, and so would not be severely harmed by grass fires of low intensity. Such fires prevented Douglas-fir and most other conifer seedlings from becoming established, allowing bunch grass prairie and oak woodland to persist. Fire also kept oak woodlands on drier soils free of a shrub understory. Wetter oak woodlands historically had a substantial shrub understory, primarily snowberry.

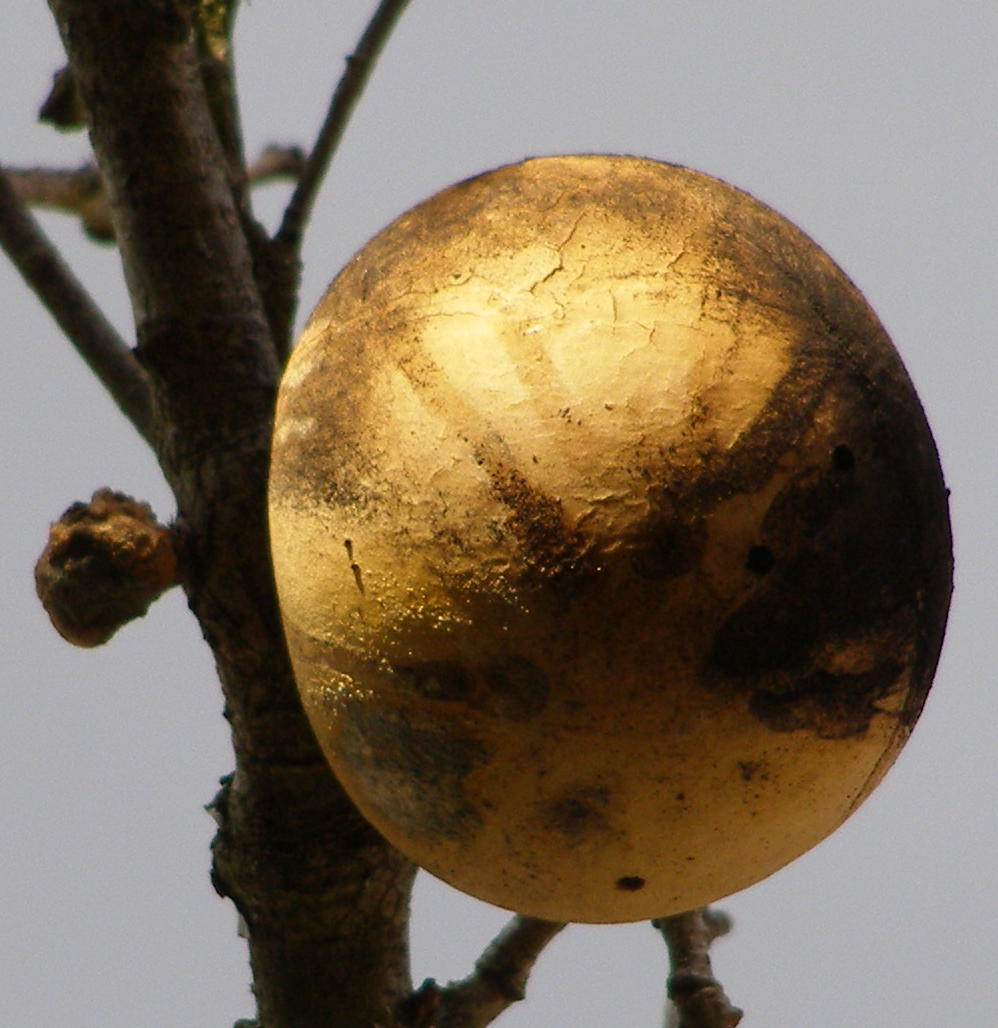
Gall on Oregon white oak, Sonoma County

Oregon white oak woodlands in British Columbia and Washington are critical habitats for a number of species - plant, animal, and bryophyte - that are rare or extirpated in these areas:

- Propertius duskywing butterfly Erynnis propertius, sole larval food plant is oak
- Bucculatrix zophopasta leaf-mining moth, sole larval food plant is oak
- Lewis's woodpecker Melanerpes lewis
- Slender-billed nuthatch (subspecies of white-breasted nuthatch) Sitta carolinensis aculeata
- Sharp tailed snake Contia tenuis
- Western gray squirrel Sciurus griseus
- Western tanager Piranga ludoviciana
- Western wood peewee Contopus sordidulus
- Western bluebird Sialia mexicana
- Sessile trillium Trillium parviflorum
- Banded cord-moss Entosthodon fascicularis
- Apple moss Bartramia stricta
- (liverwort) Riccia ciliata
- Golden Paintbrush Castilleja levisecta

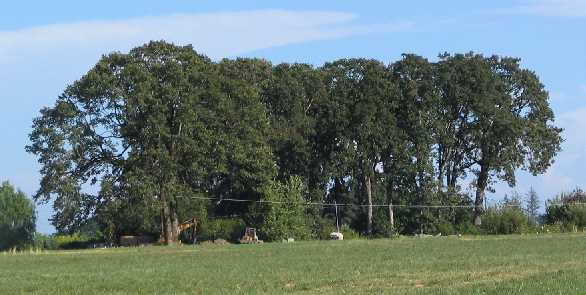
An Oregon white oak grove

Quercus garryana woodlands create a landscape mosaic of grassland, savanna, woodland, and closed-canopy forest. This mosaic of varied habitats, in turn, allows many more species to live in this area than would be possible in coniferous forest alone. Parks Canada states that Garry oak woodlands support more species of plants than any other terrestrial ecosystem in British Columbia. It grows in a variety of soil types, for instance, rocky outcrops, glacial gravelly outwash, deep grassland soils, and seasonally flooded riparian areas.

The Donation Land Claim Act of 1850 encouraged settlement of Washington and Oregon by the United States and marked the beginning of the end of regular burning by native peoples of the area. The arrival of Europeans also reduced the number of natural fires that took place in Oregon white oak habitat. With fire suppression and conversion to agriculture, oak woodlands and bunch grass prairies were invaded by Douglas-fir, Oregon ash (Fraxinus latifolia), and imported pasture grasses. Oaks were logged to clear land for pasture, and for firewood and fence posts. Livestock grazing trampled and consumed oak seedlings. By the 1990s, more than half the Oregon white oak woodland habitat in the South Puget Sound area of Washington was gone. On Vancouver Island, more than 90% was gone, and on Whidbey Island up to 99% of native understory Oregon white oak habitat is gone. Remaining Oregon white oak woodlands are threatened by urbanization, conversion to Douglas-fir woodland, and invasion by shrubs, both native and nonnative (Scotch broom Cytisus scoparius, sweetbriar rose Rosa eglanteria, snowberry Symphoricarpos albus, Indian plum Oemleria cerasiformis, poison-oak Toxicodendron diversilobum, English holly Ilex aquifolium, bird cherry Prunus avium). Conversely, oak groves in wetter areas that historically had closed canopies of large trees are becoming crowded with young oaks that grow thin and spindly, due to lack of fires that would clear out seedlings.

Chionodes petalumensis caterpillars feed on oak leaves, including those of Quercus garryana and valley oak (Q. lobata).

== Conservation ==
Oregon white oaks and their ecosystems are the focus of conservation efforts, including communities such as Tacoma, Washington, where an Oak Tree Park has been established; Oak Bay, British Columbia, which is named after the tree; and Corvallis, Oregon, which has protected the oak savannah remnants around Bald Hill. Oak Harbor, Washington, named after the tree and home to Smith Park that contains a dense grove of mature Garry Oak trees, formed the Oak Harbor Garry Oak Society to pursue conservation of the city's namesake tree.

In Southwest Washington, significant acreages of Oregon white oaks are preserved in the Scatter Creek Wildlife Area, in sites such as the Scatter Creek Unit, which contain some of the few remaining areas of south Puget Sound prairie.

In Oak Bay, British Columbia, a fine of up to $10,000 may be issued for each Garry oak tree cut or damaged.

== Uses ==
The mildly sweet (but perhaps unpalatable) acorns are edible, ideally after leaching. The bitterness of the toxic tannic acid would likely prevent anyone from eating enough to become ill. Native Americans ate the acorns raw and roasted, also using them to make a kind of flour.

The hardwood is hard and heavily ring-porous. It has distinctive growth rings and prominent rays. Heartwood can be a deep chocolate brown color and sapwood will vary from golden brown to nearly white. This makes it particularly attractive to woodworkers; however, it can be difficult to use in woodworking without experiencing warping and cracking. Although it was popularly used around the turn of the 20th century, historically the tree has not been regarded as having significant commercial value and is frequently destroyed as land is cleared for development. The wood is suitable for making fence posts. With similar qualities to those of other white oaks, the wood has been used experimentally in Oregon for creating casks in which to age wine. In Washington, it has been used for aging single malt whiskey since the 2010s. Oregon white oak barrels are said to give the whiskey "burnt sugar notes, marshmallow sweetness, and a light floral character that showcases the best of the Garry oak". When used as firewood, Oregon white oak produces 28 million British thermal units per cord (2.3 MWh/m^{3}) burned.
