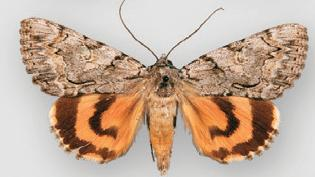
- Lectotype of Catocala beutenmuelleri, now considered a synonym of Catocala verrilliana
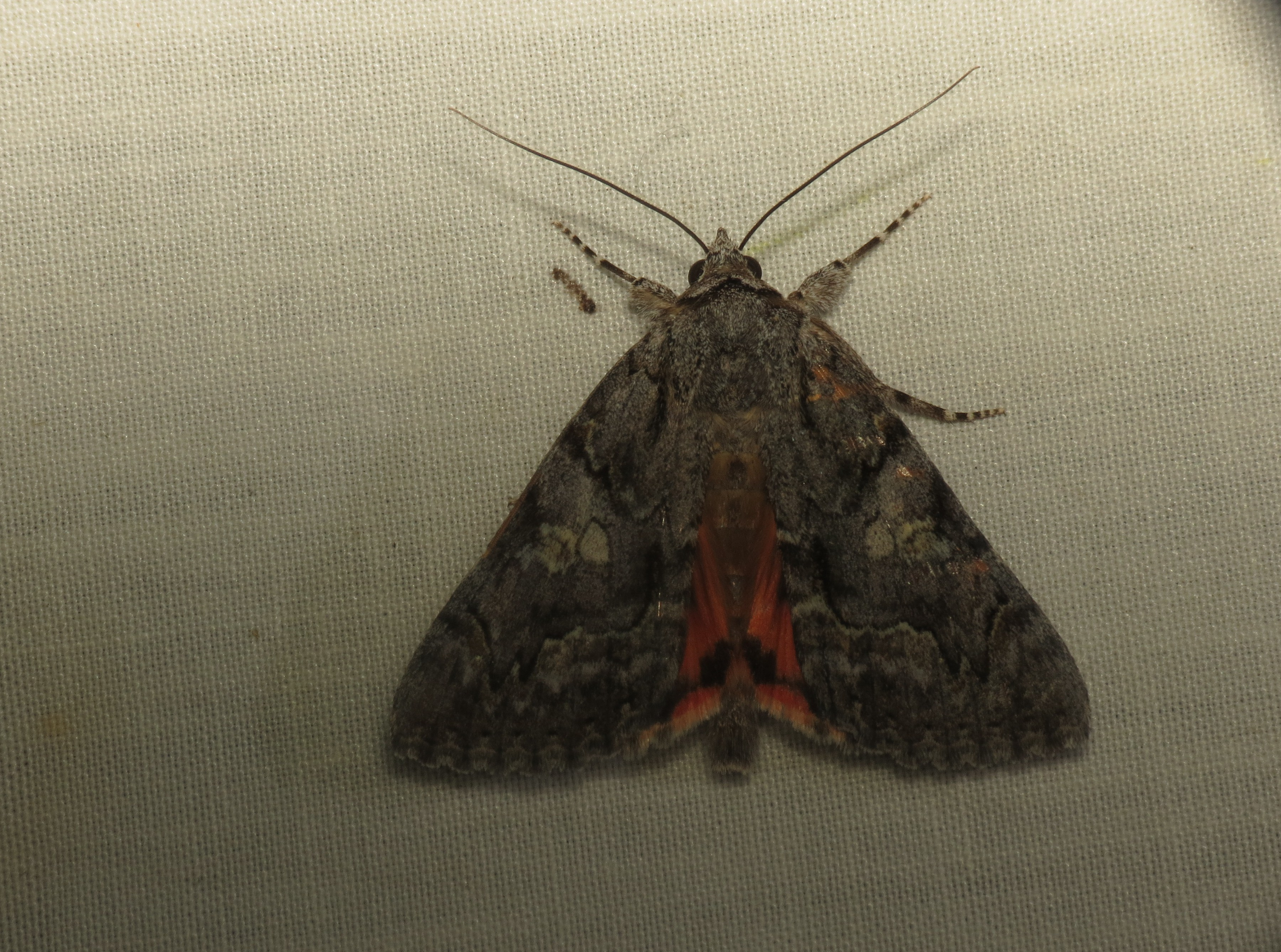

Scientific classification
- Kingdom: Animalia
- Phylum: Arthropoda
- Class: Insecta
- Order: Lepidoptera
- Superfamily: Noctuoidea
- Family: Erebidae
- Genus: Catocala
- Species: C. verrilliana

Binomial name
- Catocala verrilliana Grote, 1875

Synonyms
- Catocala werneri Biederman, 1909; Catocala verneri; Catocala beutenmuelleri Barnes & McDunnough, 1910; Catocala verrilliana var. votiva Hulst, 1884

= Catocala verrilliana =

Verrill's underwing

Species of moth

Catocala verrilliana, or Verrill's underwing, is a moth of the family Erebidae. The species was first described by Augustus Radcliffe Grote in 1875. It is found in the US from Washington and Oregon to Colorado and south to California, Arizona and Texas, and Cimarron County in western Oklahoma.

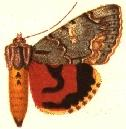
Illustration

The wingspan is 45–60 mm. Adults are on wing from May to September depending on the location. There is probably one generation per year.

The larvae feed on Quercus macrocarpa, Quercus alba and Quercus garryana.

== Subspecies ==
Catocala verrilliana beutenmulleri, recorded from Utah, is now considered a synonym.
