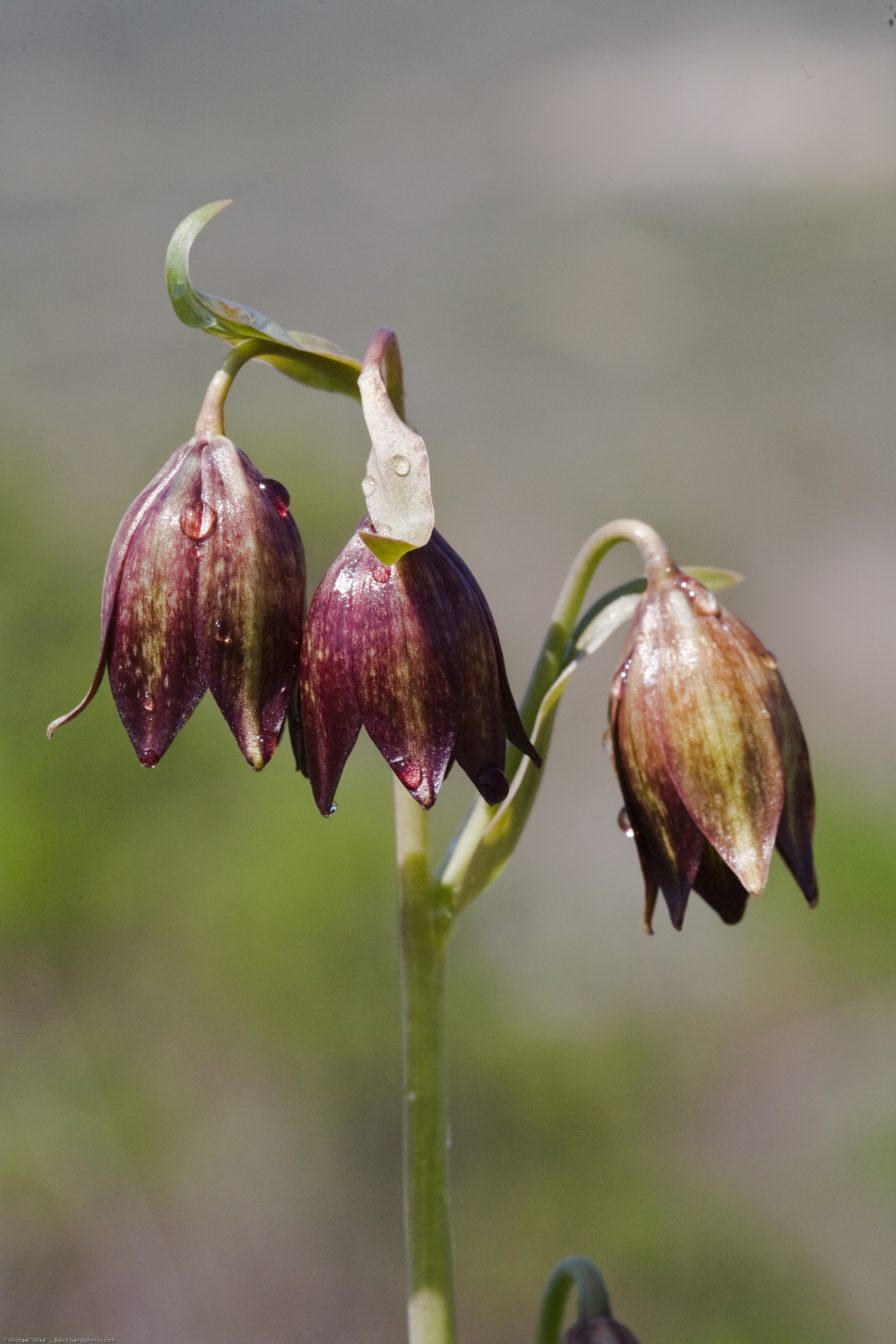

Scientific classification
- Kingdom: Plantae
- Clade: Tracheophytes
- Clade: Angiosperms
- Clade: Monocots
- Order: Liliales
- Family: Liliaceae
- Subfamily: Lilioideae
- Tribe: Lilieae
- Genus: Fritillaria
- Species: F. biflora

Binomial name
- Fritillaria biflora Lindl.

Synonyms
- Amblirion lanceolatum Sweet; Fritillaria biflora var. inflexa Jeps.; Fritillaria kamtschatcensis Torr. (not Fritillaria camschatcensis (L.) Ker Gawler); Fritillaria lanceolata Torr.; Fritillaria succulenta Elmer; Liliorhiza viridis Kellogg

= Fritillaria biflora =

Species of flowering plant

Fritillaria biflora, the chocolate lily or mission bells, is a species of fritillary native to western California, US, and northern Baja California, Mexico. It occurs in the chaparral and woodlands ecoregion, often in serpentine soil formations and hillside grassland habitats.

Fritillaria biflora is a bulbous herbaceous perennial up to 60 cm tall. It is called "chocolate lily" because its flowers can resemble the color of chocolate, although sometimes they are greenish purple or yellowish green. Flowers bloom in March and April.

Fritillaria biflora should not be confused with Arthropodium strictum, which is also called "chocolate lily". In the latter, the scent is reminiscent of chocolate, rather than the color. The Kamchatka fritillary (F. camschatcensis) is sometimes also called "chocolate lily" in Alaska.

== Varieties ==
Two varieties are recognized:

- Fritillaria biflora var. biflora—leaves widely lanceolate, most of the species range
- Fritillaria biflora var. ineziana Jeps., Fl. Calif. 1: 306 (1922). -- leaves narrowly lanceolate, endangered taxon known only from one location in San Mateo County
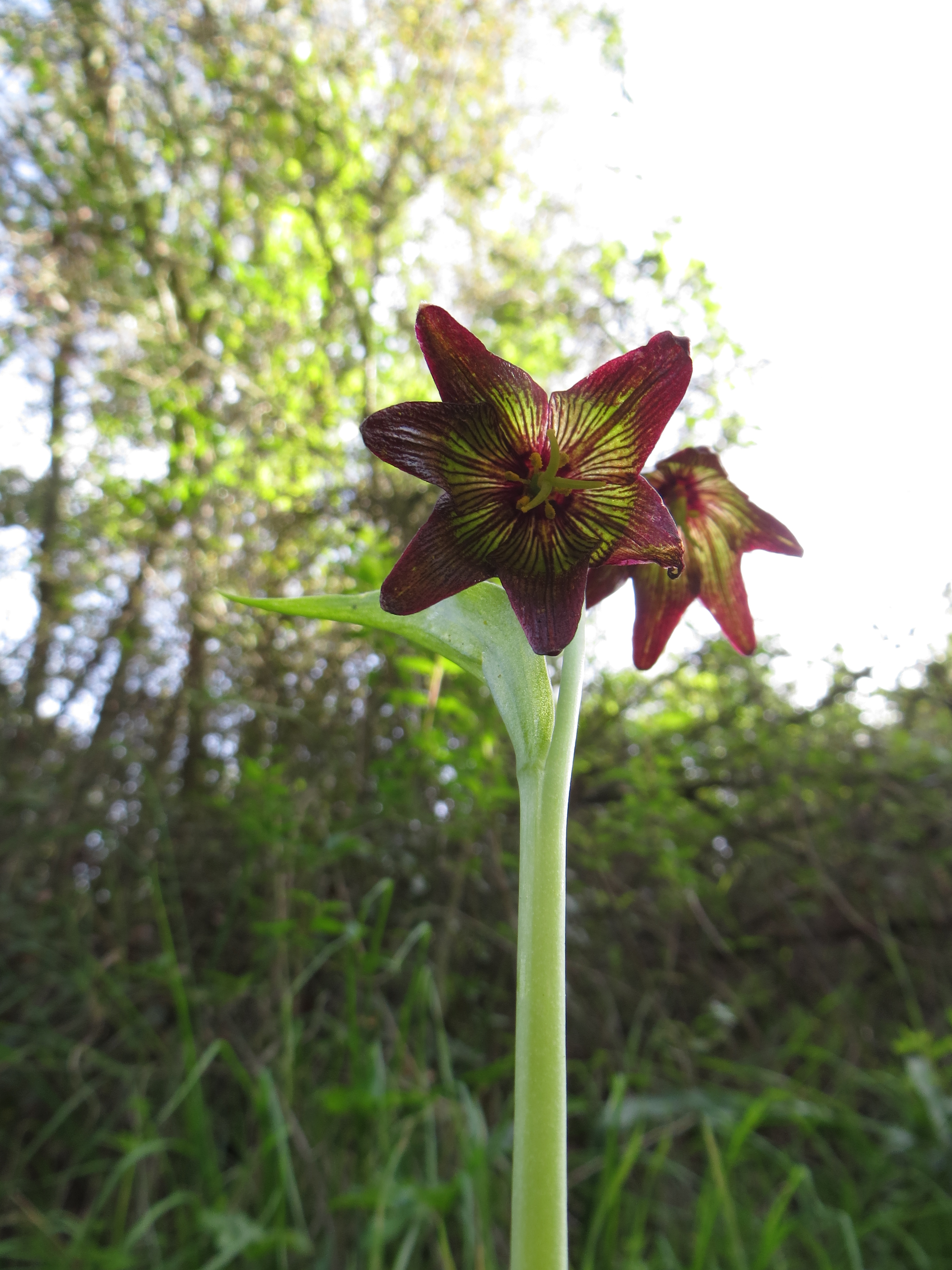

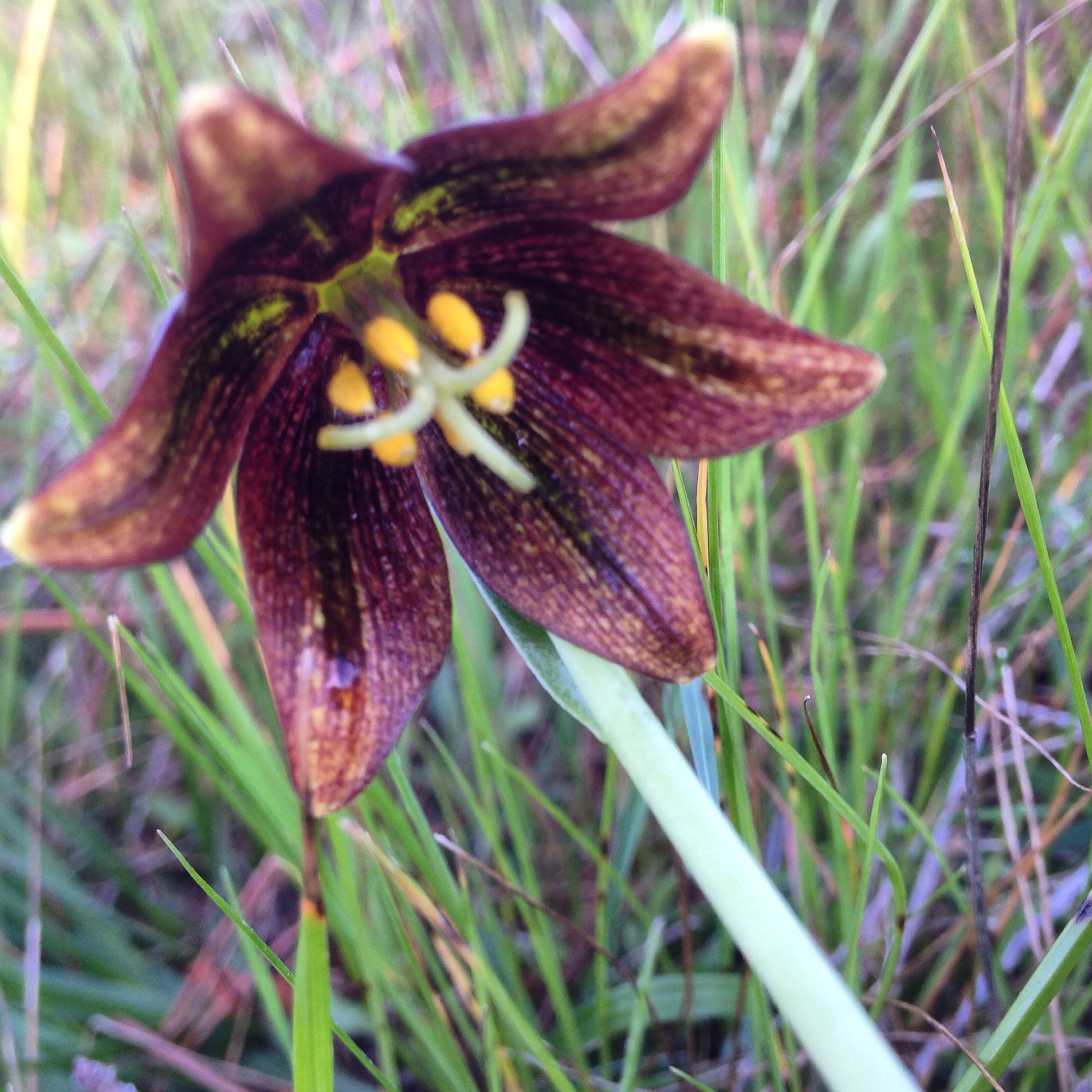

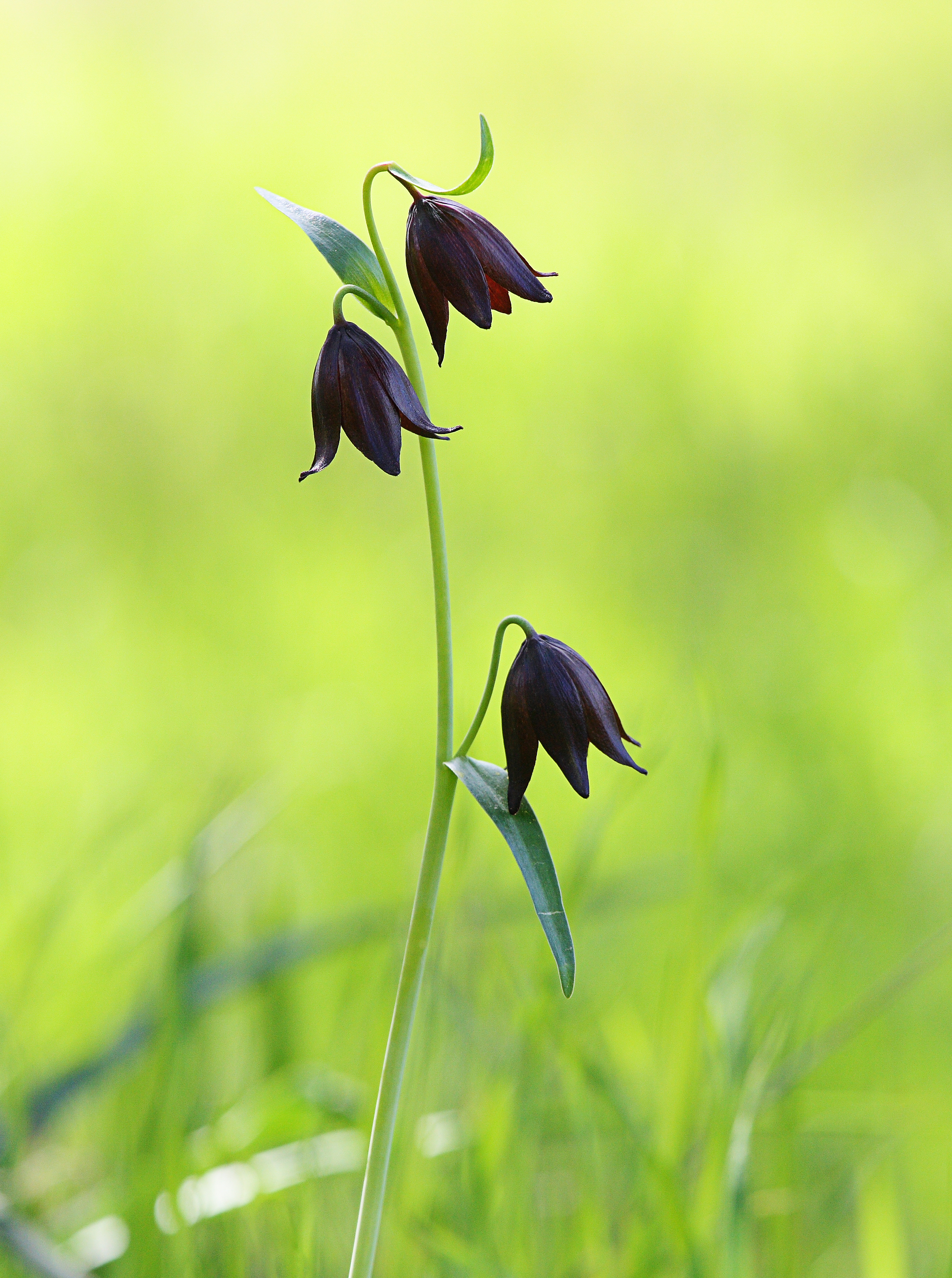

== See also ==
- California chaparral and woodlands
- California montane chaparral and woodlands
- List of plants known as lily

== References and external links ==
- Jepson Manual Treatment - Fritillaria biflora
- USDA Plants Profile; Fritillaria biflora
- Fritillaria biflora - U.C. Photo gallery
- Theodore Payne Foundation: Chocolate Lily
