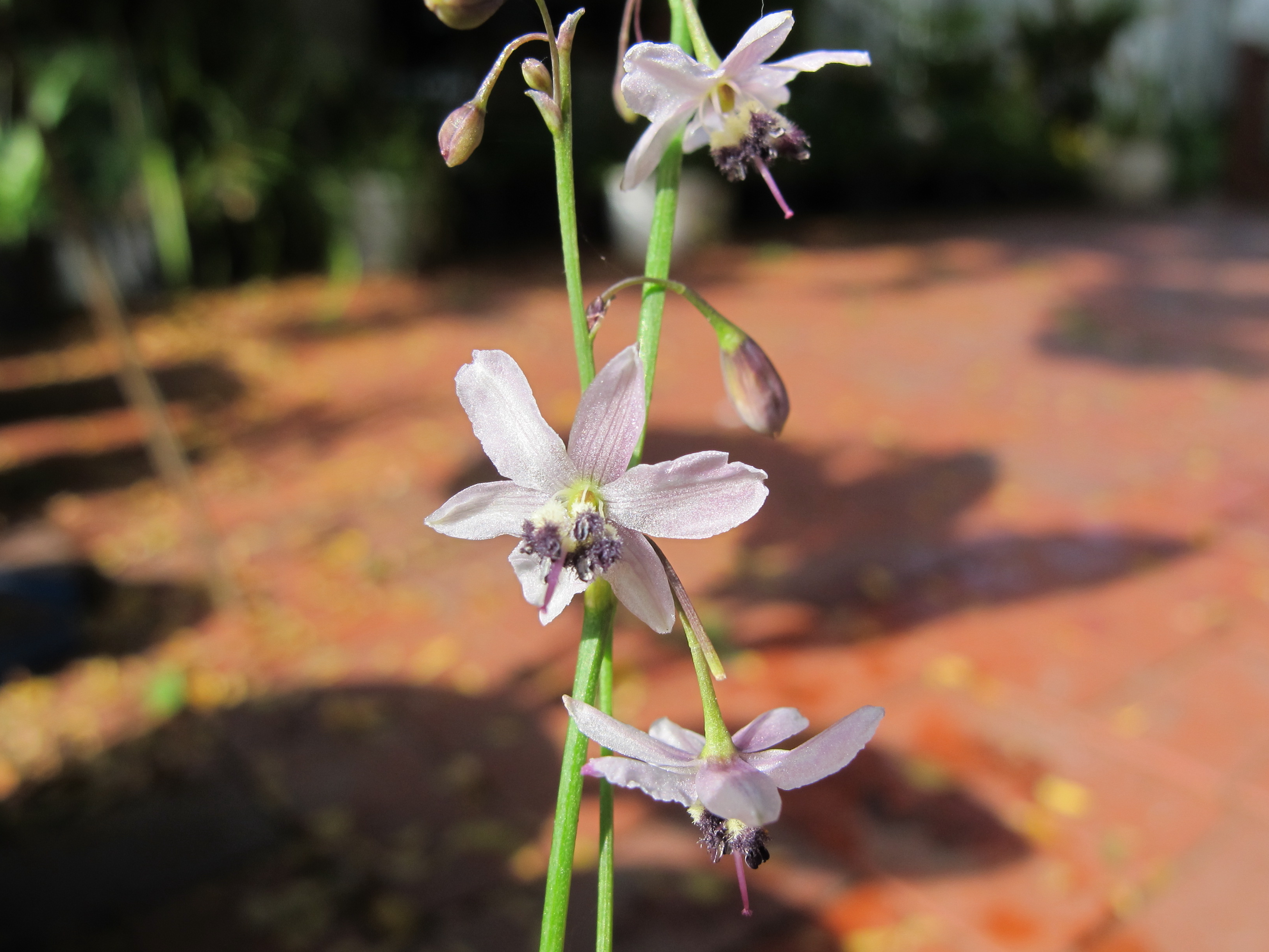

Scientific classification
- Kingdom: Plantae
- Clade: Tracheophytes
- Clade: Angiosperms
- Clade: Monocots
- Order: Asparagales
- Family: Asparagaceae
- Subfamily: Lomandroideae
- Genus: Arthropodium
- Species: A. milleflorum

Binomial name
- Arthropodium milleflorum (DC.) J.F.Macbr.

Synonyms
- Anthericum milleflorum DC. Anthericum pendulum Hornem. Arthropodium lindleyi Kunth; Arthropodium paniculatum Andrews; Arthropodium pendulum (Andrews) R.Br. Phalangium pendulum (Hornem.) D.Delaroche

= Arthropodium milleflorum =

Species of plant

Arthropodium milleflorum, the pale vanilla lily, is a species of herbaceous perennial plants native to Australia. It occurs in various habitats including alpine areas and grows to height of between 0.3 and 1.3 metres hand a width of and 0.3 metres. The fleshy tubers were eaten by Aboriginal Australians. The plant emits a strong vanilla fragrance, which becomes more noticeable on warm days.

Flowering stems appear in late spring and summer, with two or more pendulous white, pale blue, or pink flowers at each node. The tubers are typically 20–30 mm long and 3–5 mm in diameter. Arthropodium minus is a related but smaller species, producing only one flower per node.

Plants may be propagated from seeds or by dividing the tubers.
