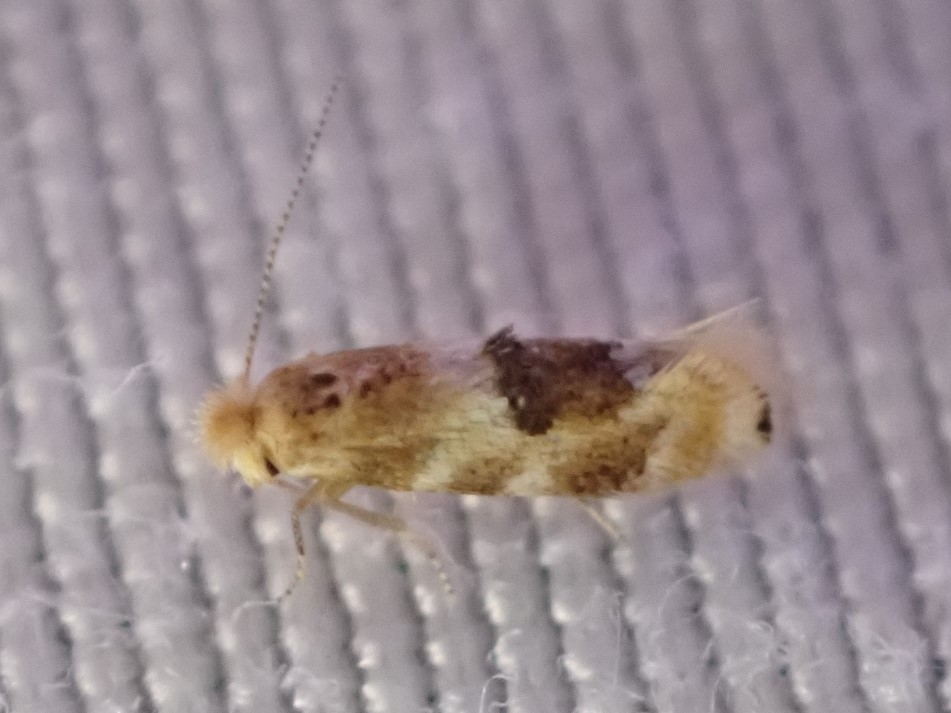

Scientific classification
- Kingdom: Animalia
- Phylum: Arthropoda
- Clade: Pancrustacea
- Class: Insecta
- Order: Lepidoptera
- Family: Bucculatricidae
- Genus: Bucculatrix
- Species: B. zophopasta

Binomial name
- Bucculatrix zophopasta Braun, 1963

= Bucculatrix zophopasta =

Species of moth

Bucculatrix zophopasta is a species of moth in the family Bucculatricidae. It was described by Annette Frances Braun in 1963 and is found in western North America, where it has been recorded from British Columbia, Oregon and California.

Adults have been recorded on wing in March, June and August.

The larvae feed on Quercus garryana and possibly Quercus lobata.
