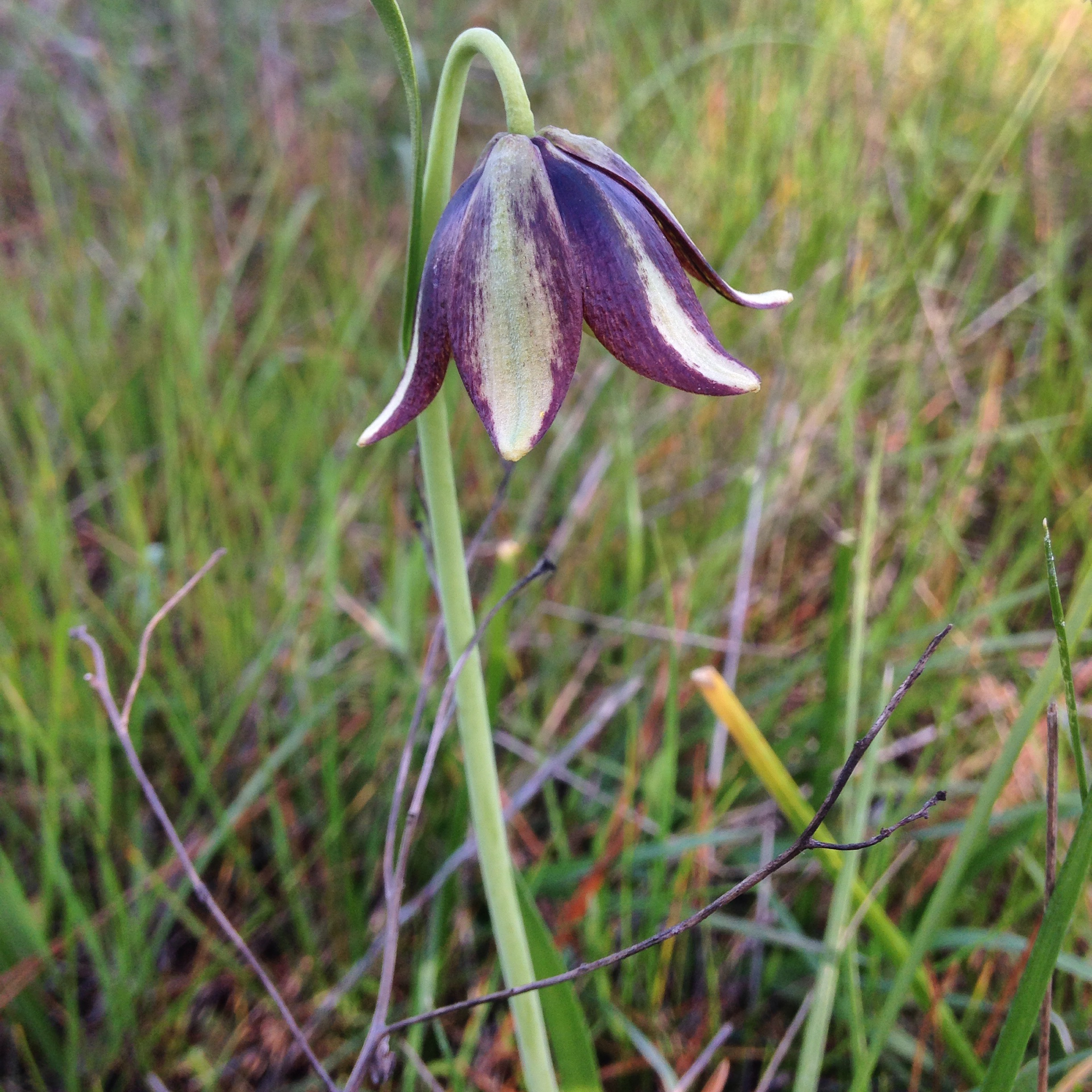

Conservation status
- Critically Imperiled (NatureServe)

Scientific classification
- Kingdom: Plantae
- Clade: Tracheophytes
- Clade: Angiosperms
- Clade: Monocots
- Order: Liliales
- Family: Liliaceae
- Subfamily: Lilioideae
- Tribe: Lilieae
- Genus: Fritillaria
- Species: F. biflora
- Variety: F. b. var. ineziana

Trinomial name
- Fritillaria biflora var. ineziana Jeps.

= Fritillaria biflora var. ineziana =

Variety of flowering plant

Fritillaria biflora var. ineziana, the Hillsborough chocolate lily, is a species of fritillary endemic to San Mateo County, California. It grows on serpentinite in cismontane woodland and valley and foothill grassland at elevations that range from 295 to 525 feet (90 to 160 meters) It is typically found on serpentine soils, and it is defined as a "broad endemic" (5.4/6.2 affinity) where 85-94% of occurrences are expected to occur on ultramafic soils.

== Description ==
Fritillaria biflora var. ineziana is a perennial bulbiferous herb growing to a maximum height of 4 to 10 inches tall. The stem is stout and slender and bears 1-2 yellow-green, green-purple, or dark brown flowers that possess an unpleasant odor. The linear oblong leaves are often faintly mottled with yellow. The holotype specimen was collected by Inez Smith on Mar 12, 1914, and it is presently cataloged at the Jepson Herbarium (Specimen number JEPS4952). An isotype exists at the Rancho Santa Ana Botanic Garden Herbarium (Specimen number: RSA279408).

== Distribution ==
Fritillaria biflora var. ineziana is endemic to California and only known to occur in the Hillsborough area of San Mateo County in the San Francisco Bay Area. The California Natural Diversity Database only has two known locations of this species - one from the Montara Mountain/San Mateo 7.5 minute USGS quadrangles and the other one from the San Mateo quadrangle.

== Conservation ==
The California Native Plant Society ranks F. biflora var. ineziana as a 1B.1 rare plant rank - seriously endangered in California.
