= Chocolate lily =

Chocolate lily refers to any of a number of flowering plant species:

- Dichopogon strictus (syn. Arthropodium strictum), whose flowers smell of chocolate
- Fritillaria affinis, also called rice-root or checker lily, from western North America
- Fritillaria biflora, with chocolate-brown flowers, in California
- Fritillaria camschatcensis (Kamchatka fritillary), with chocolate-brown flowers, in Alaska
