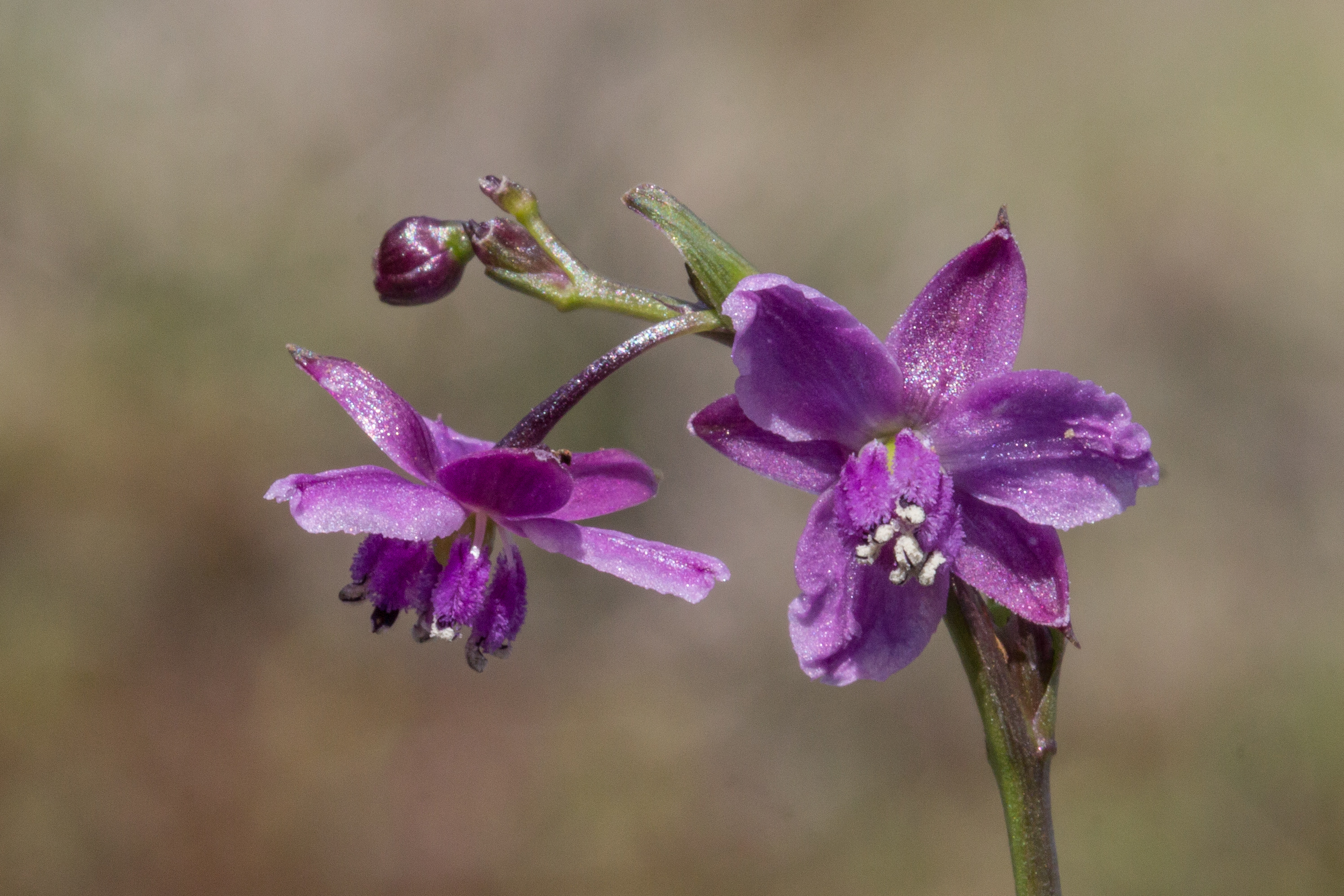

Scientific classification
- Kingdom: Plantae
- Clade: Tracheophytes
- Clade: Angiosperms
- Clade: Monocots
- Order: Asparagales
- Family: Asparagaceae
- Subfamily: Lomandroideae
- Genus: Arthropodium
- Species: A. minus

Binomial name
- Arthropodium minus R.Br.

= Arthropodium minus =

Species of plant

Arthropodium minus, the small vanilla lily, is a species of herbaceous perennial plants native to the Southern Hemisphere. Valued as bush tucker as the roots are edible raw. Found in a variety of habitats from the coast to alpine areas of eastern Australia. Eucalyptus forests, woodlands and sub-alpine meadows, favouring drier habitats than Arthropodium milleflorum.

The grasslike leaves have a strong scent of vanilla. The plant is deciduous in drought, and resprouts after fire. Some 35 cm in height, the flowers which appear September–December are purple or pink. The fruit matures during January–February and contains about 16 seeds. A. minus is a garden ornamental easily cultivated from seed.
