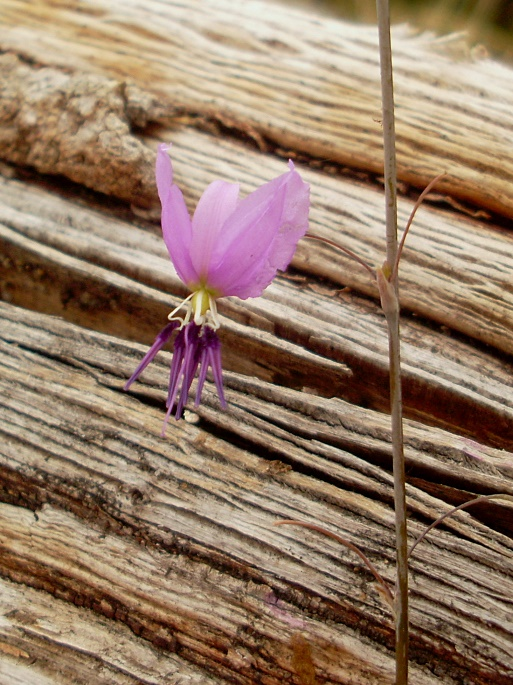
- Dichopogon capillipes

Scientific classification
- Kingdom: Plantae
- Clade: Tracheophytes
- Clade: Angiosperms
- Clade: Monocots
- Order: Asparagales
- Family: Asparagaceae
- Subfamily: Lomandroideae
- Genus: Dichopogon; Kunth

Synonyms
- Siona Salisb.

= Dichopogon =

Genus of flowering plants

Dichopogon is a genus of perennial herbs, native to Australia and New Guinea. It is included in the genus Arthropodium by some authorities, although recognized as a distinct genus by others. In the APG III classification system, it is placed in the family Asparagaceae, subfamily Lomandroideae (formerly the family Laxmanniaceae).

The name is derived from the Greek words δίχα (dicha, "duplicate") and πώγων (pogon, "barb").

Species

- Dichopogon capillipes (Endl.) Brittan - Western Australia
- Dichopogon fimbriatus (R.Br.) J.F.Macbr. = Arthropodium fimbriatum R.Br. - New South Wales, South Australia, Victoria, Western Australia
- Dichopogon preissii (Endl.) Brittan - Western Australia
- Dichopogon strictus (R.Br.) Baker = Arthropodium strictum R.Br. New Guinea, New South Wales, South Australia, Victoria
- Dichopogon tyleri Brittan - Western Australia
