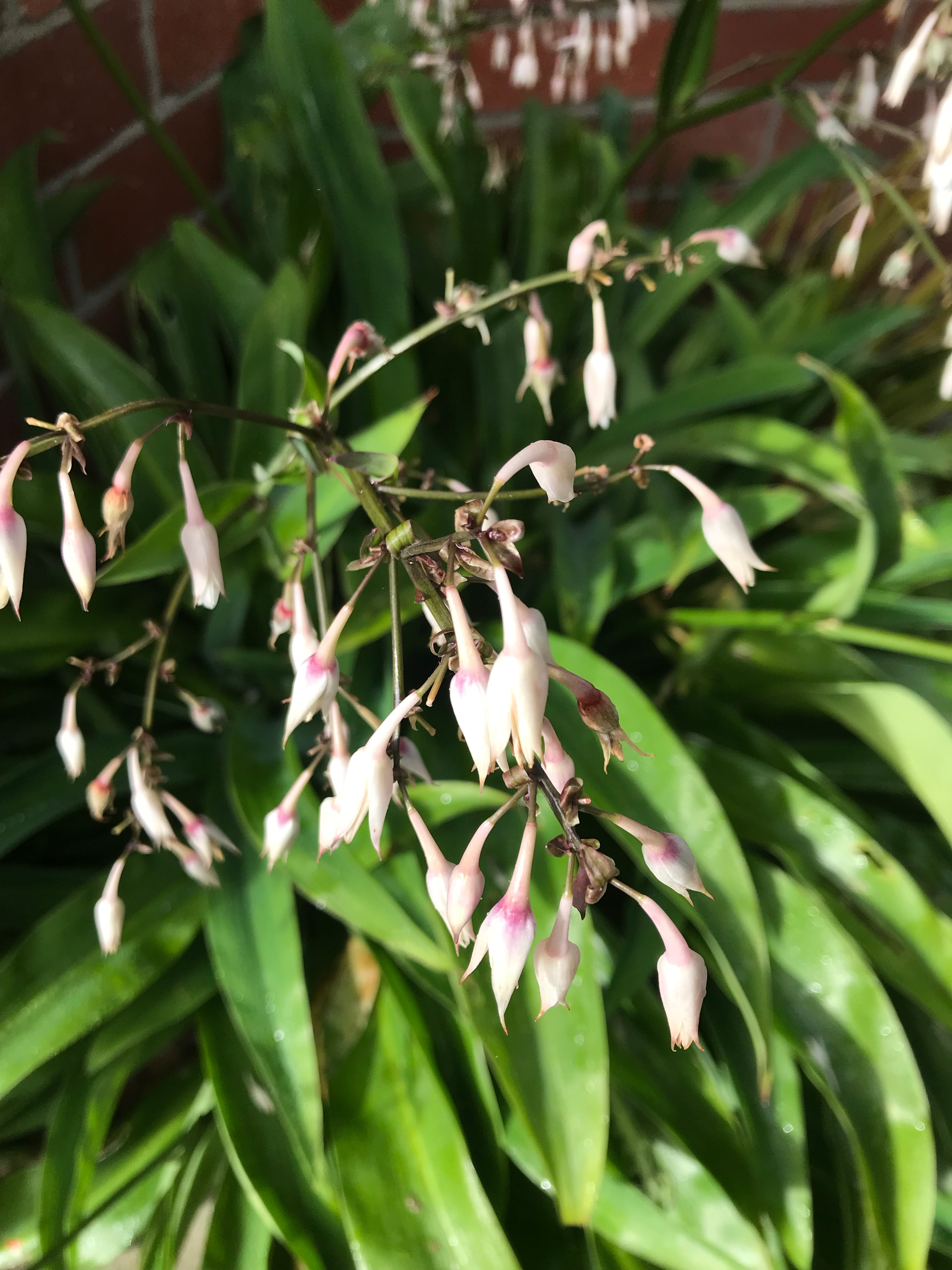

Scientific classification
- Kingdom: Plantae
- Clade: Tracheophytes
- Clade: Angiosperms
- Clade: Monocots
- Order: Asparagales
- Family: Asparagaceae
- Subfamily: Lomandroideae
- Genus: Arthropodium
- Species: A. cirratum

Binomial name
- Arthropodium cirratum (G.Forst.) R.Br.

Synonyms
- Anthericum cirratum G.Forst. Anthericum latifolium Banks & Sol. ex Kunth

= Arthropodium cirratum =

Species of flowering plant

Arthropodium cirratum commonly known as rengarenga, renga lily, New Zealand rock lily, or maikaika, is a species of herbaceous perennial plant, endemic to New Zealand, where it may once have been farmed. It is used for medicine as well as food, and has symbolic importance in traditional Māori culture.

The Māori name rengarenga is a reduplication of Proto-Polynesian *renga which in other related languages corresponds to turmeric, especially its powdered form (see Samoan: lega, Hawaiian: lena); this association is due to both plants' similar stem and root characteristics.

== Description ==
The leaves are 30–60 cm (12–24 in) long and 3–10 cm (1.2–3.9 in) wide. The flower stalk often reaches one metre, and bears many white six-petalled flowers, in groups of two or three, each about 2 cm (0.8 in) across. The stamens are tricoloured - purple and white, with yellow at the curled end. The roots are 2–3 cm (0.8–1.2 in) wide.

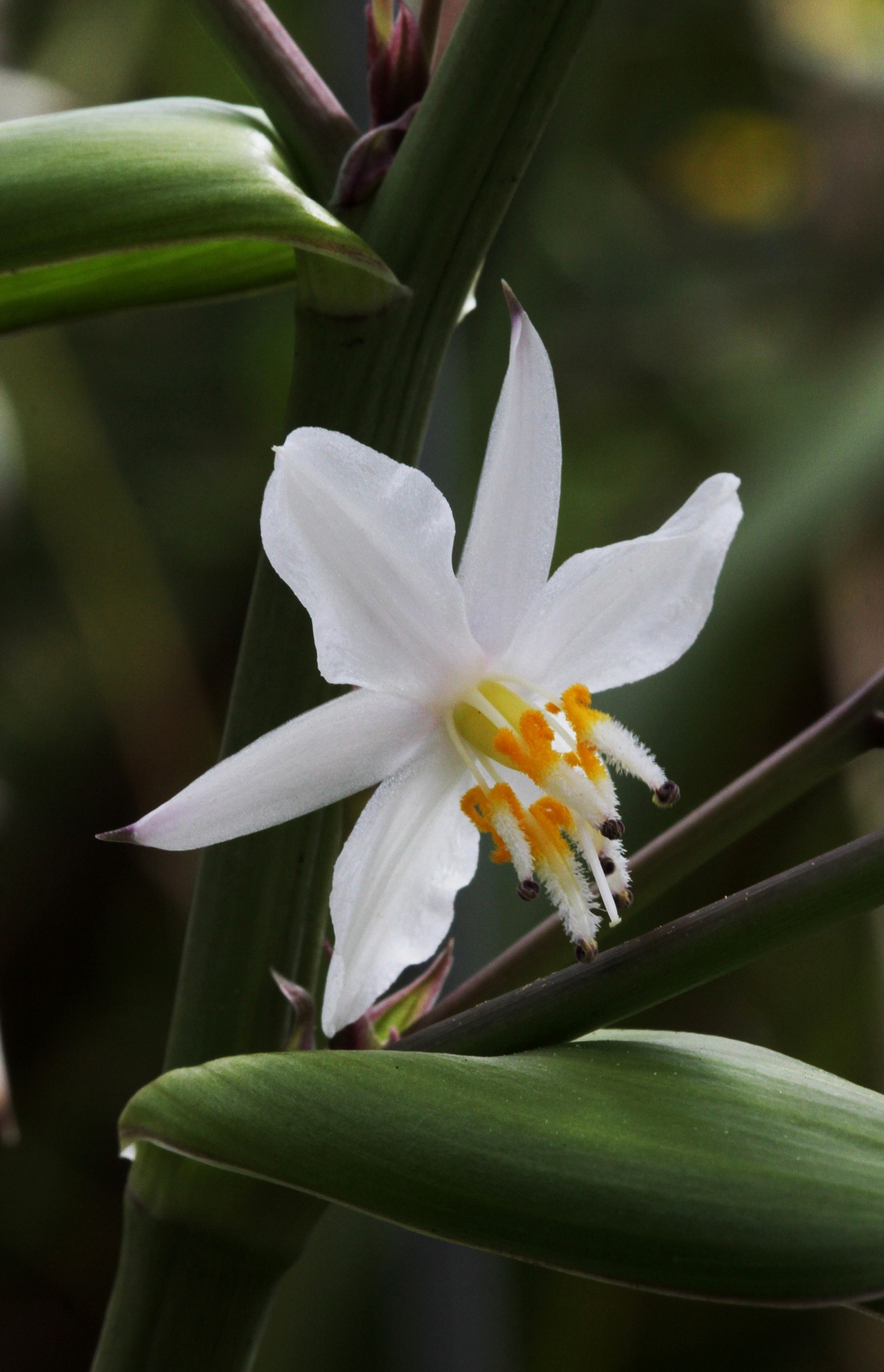
Rengarenga flower

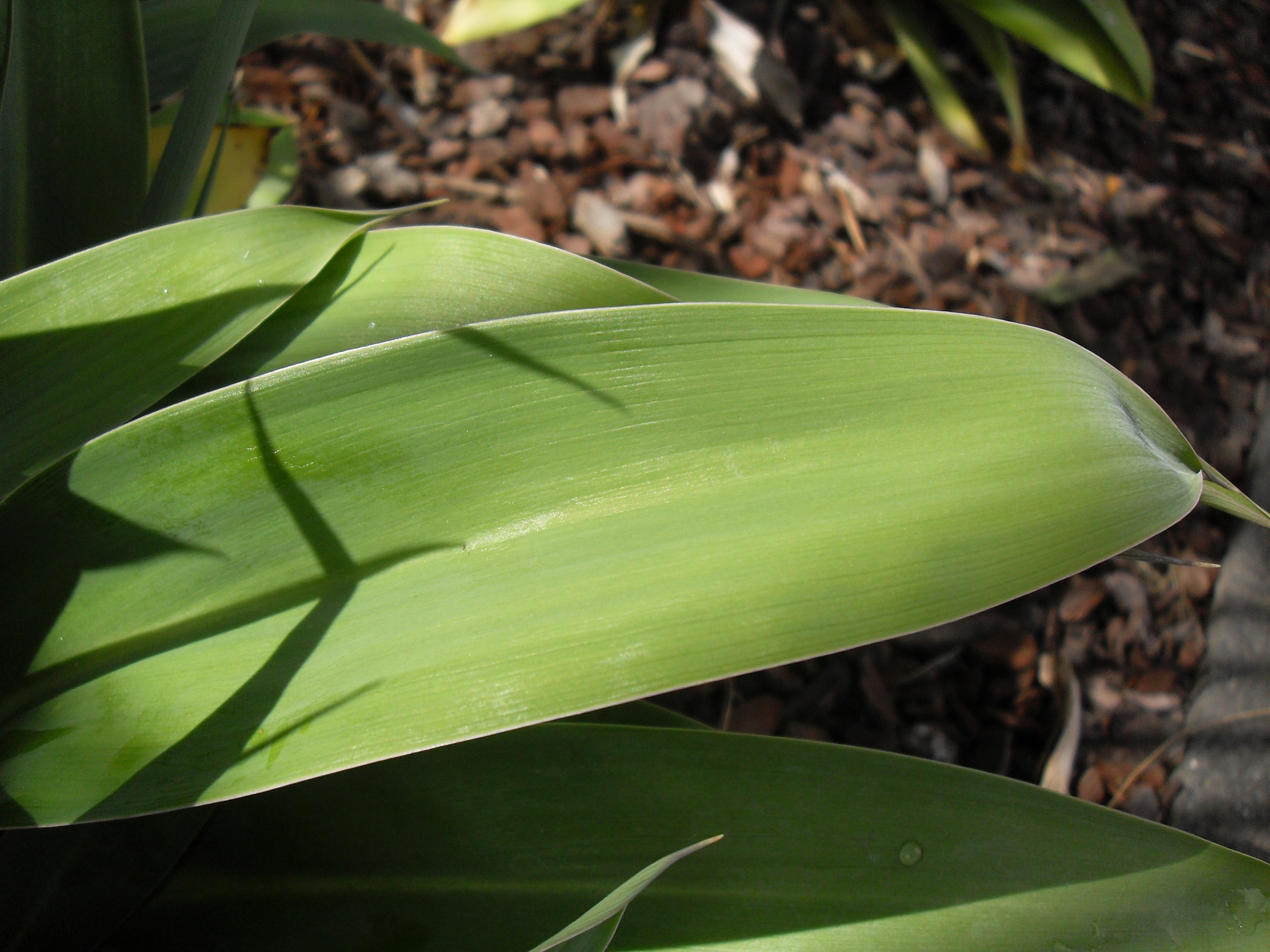
Rengarenga leaves

== Taxonomy ==
It was first described in 1786 as Anthericum cirrhatum by Georg Forster. In 1822, Robert Brown assigned it to the genus, Arthropodium, resulting in the name, Arthropodium cirrhatum (now A. cirratum.)

== Distribution and habitat ==
It occurs naturally north of Greymouth and Kaikōura near the sea and, as the name suggests, usually on rocks.

== Cultivation and uses ==
It is often grown as an ornamental plant. The rhizomes are edible when cooked and can be found throughout the year. The rhizomes were once eaten by the Māori after being cooked in a hāngī. William Colenso believed, for two reasons, that this plant was once cultivated by them: firstly, the plant grows much larger under cultivation than it usually does in the wild; and secondly it was often found near old deserted Māori homes and plantations. However, he lists it as only fourteenth in importance, in his list of eighteen kinds of wild vegetable food used by the Māori.
