= Nicholas Garry =

British trader in western Canada (1782–1852)

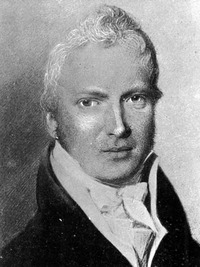
- Nicholas Garry, deputy Governor of the HBC.
- Born: 1782; Great Britain
- Died: December 7, 1852 (aged 69–70); Claygate, Surrey, England
- Occupations: merchant and Deputy Governor of HBC

Nicholas Garry (1782–1852) was a British trader who toured the remote trading posts of the Hudson's Bay Company after it merged with its younger rival, the North West Company. After the directors of the two companies agreed to end decades of rivalry and violence with a merger, each firm needed to send a director out to the major trading posts to explain the merger to the trading posts' managers. Garry was chosen by the HBC, in part due to his relative youth and good health, as the travel would be arduous.

Garry maintained a diary during his travels, which his grandson, Francis Garry, edited for posterity. Contemporary historians continue to use his diary.

Fort Garry's name honours Garry. The major Canadian city of Winnipeg, Manitoba developed around Fort Garry.
