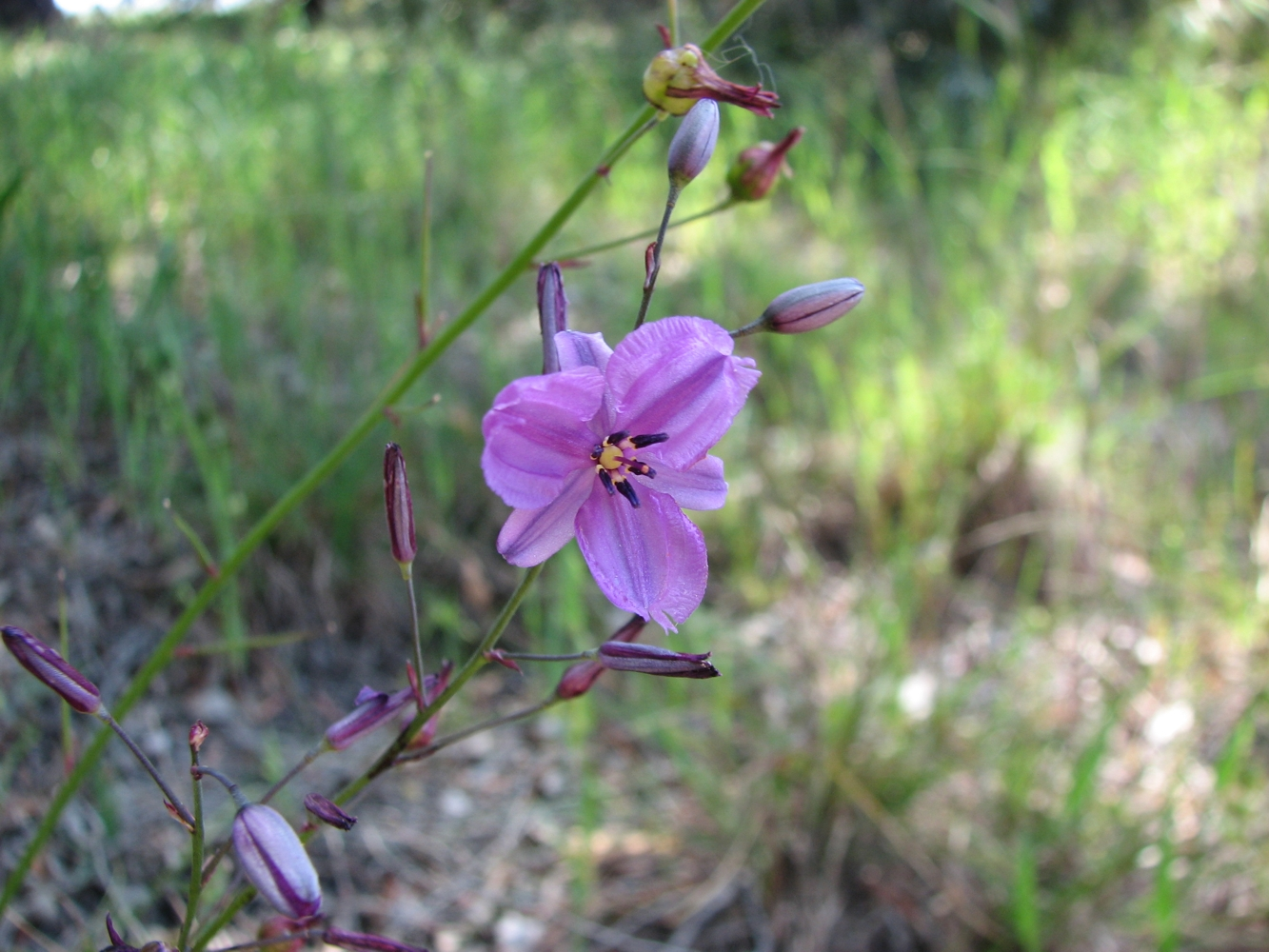

Scientific classification
- Kingdom: Plantae
- Clade: Tracheophytes
- Clade: Angiosperms
- Clade: Monocots
- Order: Asparagales
- Family: Asparagaceae
- Subfamily: Lomandroideae
- Genus: Dichopogon
- Species: D. strictus

Binomial name
- Dichopogon strictus (R.Br.) Baker

Synonyms
- Arthropodium strictum R.Br.; Arthropodium stricta

= Dichopogon strictus =

Species of plant

Dichopogon strictus (syn. Arthropodium strictum), commonly known as chocolate lily, is a herbaceous perennial plant species native to Australia.

== Description ==
The species has up to 12 leaves that are linear or lanceolate in shape and are up to 65 cm long and 1–12 mm wide. The racemose inflorescence is up to 1 metre high. This appears between August and January in the species' native range. The individual, drooping flowers range in colour from pale mauve to dark purple. The common name chocolate lily alludes to the scent of the flowers which resembles chocolate, caramel or vanilla.

The tubers, which are juicy and slightly bitter in taste, are eaten by Indigenous Australians.

== Taxonomy ==
The species was formally described in 1810 by Scottish botanist Robert Brown, based on plant material collected at Port Dalrymple in Tasmania. Brown gave it the name Arthropodium strictum. In 1876, English botanist John Gilbert Baker transferred it to the genus Dichopogon. The name is treated as Dichopogon strictus in the World Checklist of Selected Plant Families and by the National Herbarium of New South Wales, while the name Arthropodium strictum is used in the Northern Territory, Queensland, South Australia, Victoria and Tasmania as well as in the 2006 Australian Plant Census.

== Cultivation ==
Plants prefer a well-drained situation with partial to full sun exposure. In drought conditions, plants may shrivel back to the tuber then resprout with autumn rains, whereas in situations where steady moisture levels are maintained in the soil, the summer flowering period will be extended. The species is suited to group plantings under trees or may be grown in containers.

== See also ==
- List of plants known as lily
