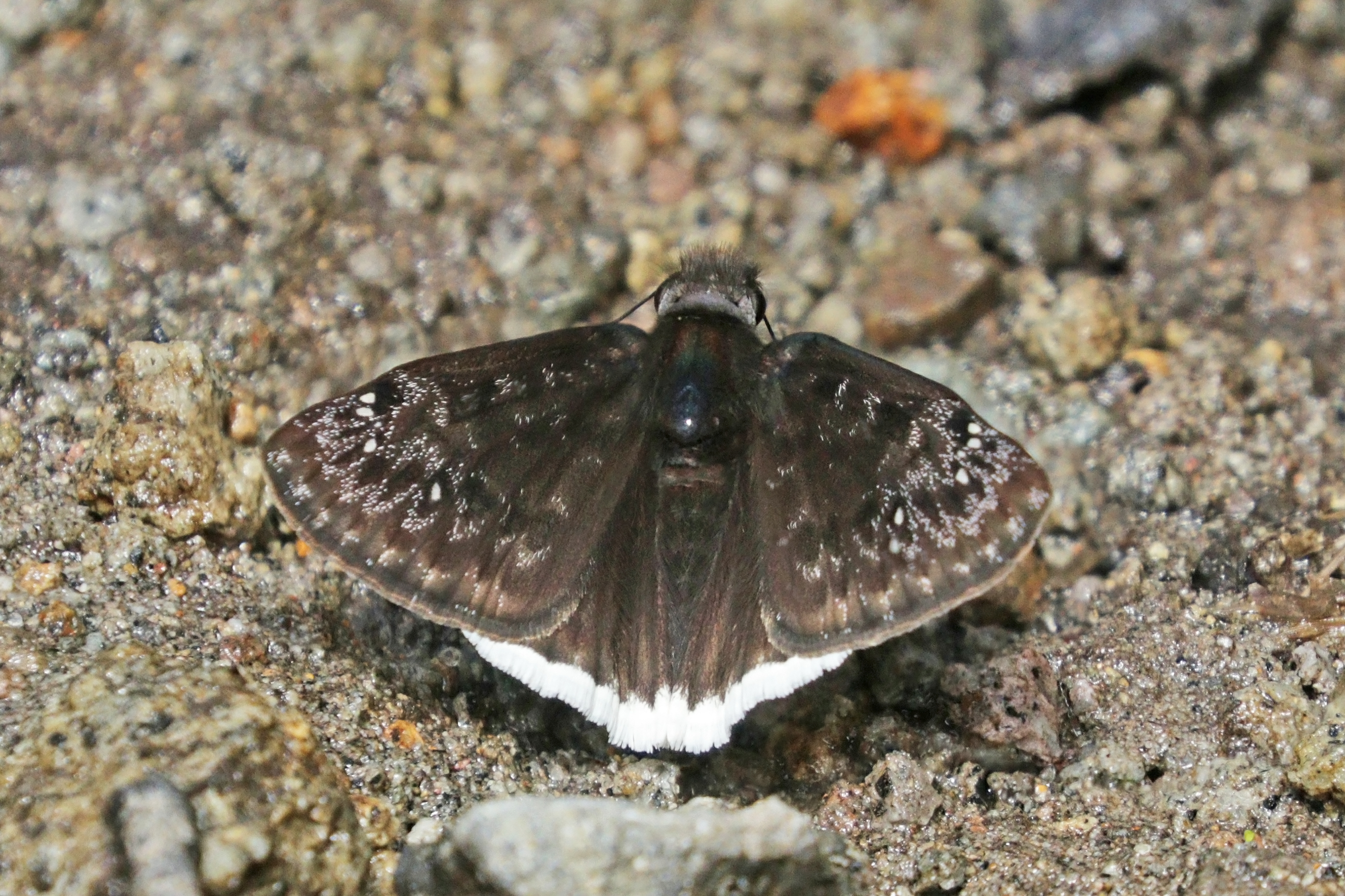
- Erynnis tristis tatius Panama

Scientific classification
- Kingdom: Animalia
- Phylum: Arthropoda
- Clade: Pancrustacea
- Class: Insecta
- Order: Lepidoptera
- Family: Hesperiidae
- Genus: Erynnis
- Species: E. tristis

Binomial name
- Erynnis tristis (Boisduval, 1852)

= Erynnis tristis =

Mournful duskywing

Species of butterfly

Erynnis tristis, commonly known as the mournful duskywing, is a species of spread-wing skipper in the butterfly family Hesperiidae that is commonly found in North America in oak woodlands. It is mottled brown with a white fringe on the hind wings. It is commonly mistaken for Erynnis funeralis due to both species having a white fringe on the hindwing. Erynnis tristis relies heavily on a variety of oak species as a hostplant, where the larvae feed on oak while the adults nectar from a variety of wild and garden flowers. This butterfly mates through hill-topping, where males perch on various objects to attract females.

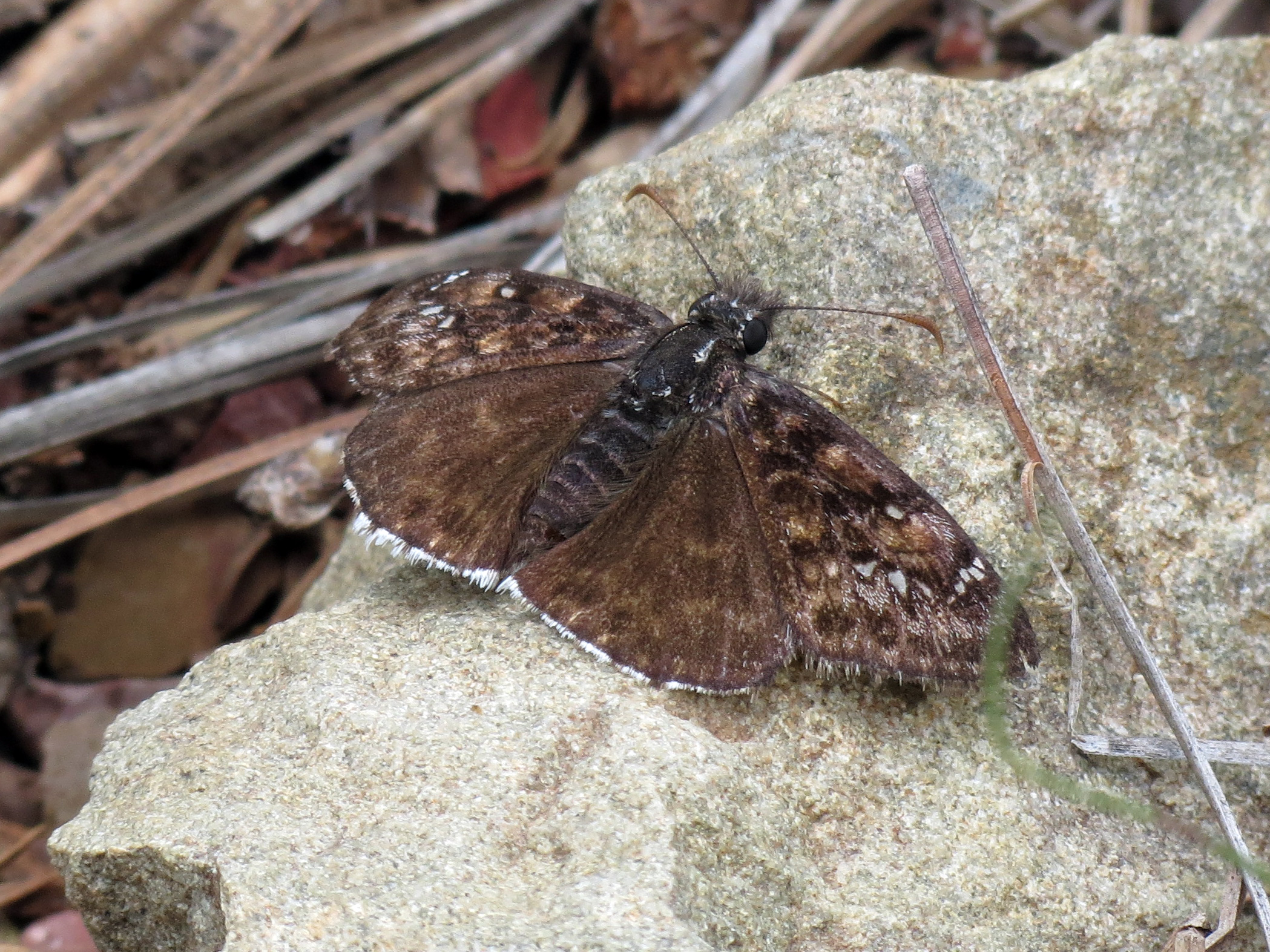
Mournful duskywing, Erynnis tristis

== Description ==
The spherical eggs are laid on the terminal end of a hostplant. While initially yellow, the eggs will turn deep orange with maturation. Rather than being laid in clusters or groups, females will lay their eggs singly in separate locations. Once the egg progresses to the larval stage, the larvae are gray-green, covered with white spots throughout its body, and has lateral yellow stripes. The head has a brown coloration. The pupa are gray-green and are hairy.

The majority of the vestiture on the wings of the adults consists of primarily a brown coloration, with black spots on the part of the wing closer to the body. Adults have scales with a white coloration on the fringe of their hindwing that distinguishes them from most butterfly species. This white coloration typically reaches to the base of the scale.

Its appearance is similar to Erynnis funeralis, which is the only other species of the Erynnis genus that also has a white fringe on the hindwing. Furthermore, Erynnis funeralis and Erynnis tristis significantly overlap in spatial distribution in California and Arizona. However, Erynnis funearlis has a longer and more narrow forewing than Erynnis tristis. Erynnis funeralis typically grows to a wing span size of 33 to 38 mm, while adults of Erynnis tristis are 28 to 31 mm in length. Males of Erynnis funeralis possess a metatibial tuft, a cluster of scales on the tibia of the hind leg that stores pheromones associated with mating. The metatibial tuft is a feature not observed in males of Erynnis tristis.

== Habitat ==
E. tristis prefers forest clearings and oak woodlands. E. tristis has an urban presence as well, representing its adaptation and flexibility to human disturbances. In Palo Alto, E. tristis was observed frequenting primarily open-space recreation areas, with a smaller presence in nature preserves and office parks. This represents a disconnected distribution in the urban gradient, where E. tristis was not found in residential areas or golf courses.

== Host plants ==
Erynnis tristis have a variety of different oak species as host plants, such as the coast live oak (Quercus agrifolia), valley oak (Quercus lobata), blue oak (Quercus douglasii), and interior live oak (Quercus wislizeni). The larvae consume the leaves of the host plants, while the adults have been observed to partake in puddling, or sipping mud to ingest essential minerals, as well as sipping from flower nectar as a nutrient source. Thus, Erynnis tristis is typically found in the vicinity of oak plants.

In addition to the listed host plants, they have adapted to using the exotic plant species cork oak (Quercus suber) as a host as well. The cork oak falls in the same genus as the other host plants of the mournful duskywing, which explains the compatibility of the insect with cork oak as its host.

== Mating behavior ==
The butterflies practice the hill-topping mating system, in which males will wait on various perches for receptive females to mate with. The males have been observed perching on various plants, including foothills paloverde (Parkinsonia microphylla), barrel cactus (Ferocactus wislezni), and creosote (Larrea tridentata). Though the perches are commonly plants and shrubs, males have also been observed perching on boulders as well. The butterflies have been observed periodically flying around the perch and landing at the area prior to the flight. Males will leave their perch either to pursue passing butterflies, or to chase rival males in a competition for the perching location. The interaction with two males includes a descending flight to the ground, where the butterflies turn about one another. The butterfly lower to the ground will fly away from the other male and the perching location.

With a receptive female, the male will fly behind the female. Subsequently, the two will then land and mate on the ground. In contrast, females that reject the male's advances to mate will fly vertically. It was observed that 98% of the females at the perches are virgins, indicating that the females visiting the perches primarily do so to mate. To aid in choosing a mate of the right species, the males and females have their respective scent scales, where the males have scent scales on the fore wing, while the females have scent scales on their abdomen.

== Subspecies ==
The species Erynnis tristis has 3 subspecies: Erynnis tristis tatius, Erynnis tristis tristis, and Erynnis tristis pattersoni.

=== Erynnis tristis pattersoni ===
This subspecies is the newest subspecies of Erynnis tristis, discovered by John Burns in 1964. This subspecies has an extremely small spatial distribution relative to the other subspecies, being found only in Southern Baja California in the Cape District.

=== Erynnis tristis tatius ===
This subspecies has been found in the Navajo mountain peak of Arizona, Edwards plateau of Texas, and central/southeastern Utah, and southwestern New Mexico. Overall, the spatial distribution of Erynnis tristis tatius is generally to the East compared to the distribution of E. t. pattersoni and E. t. tristis. This subspecies is multivoltine, having two distinct phenotypes. Both Arizona and Texas have three generations, where the month of May is the time separating individuals of phenotype one (March to May) from phenotype 2 (June to September). Phenotype two is larger than phenotype one, and has less white coloration compared to phenotype one.

=== Erynnis tristis tristis: ===
This subspecies was the first of its species Erynnis tristis to be discovered, being published by Jean Baptise Bouisduval in 1852. This subspecies is found all throughout California, stretching to northern Baja California as well. On average, Erynnis tristis tristis is smaller than Erynnis tristis tautius. This subspecies is multivoltine, but has no distinct phenotypes across generations. The population of Erynnis tristis tristis fluctuates significantly less than Erynnis tristis tautius throughout the year.
