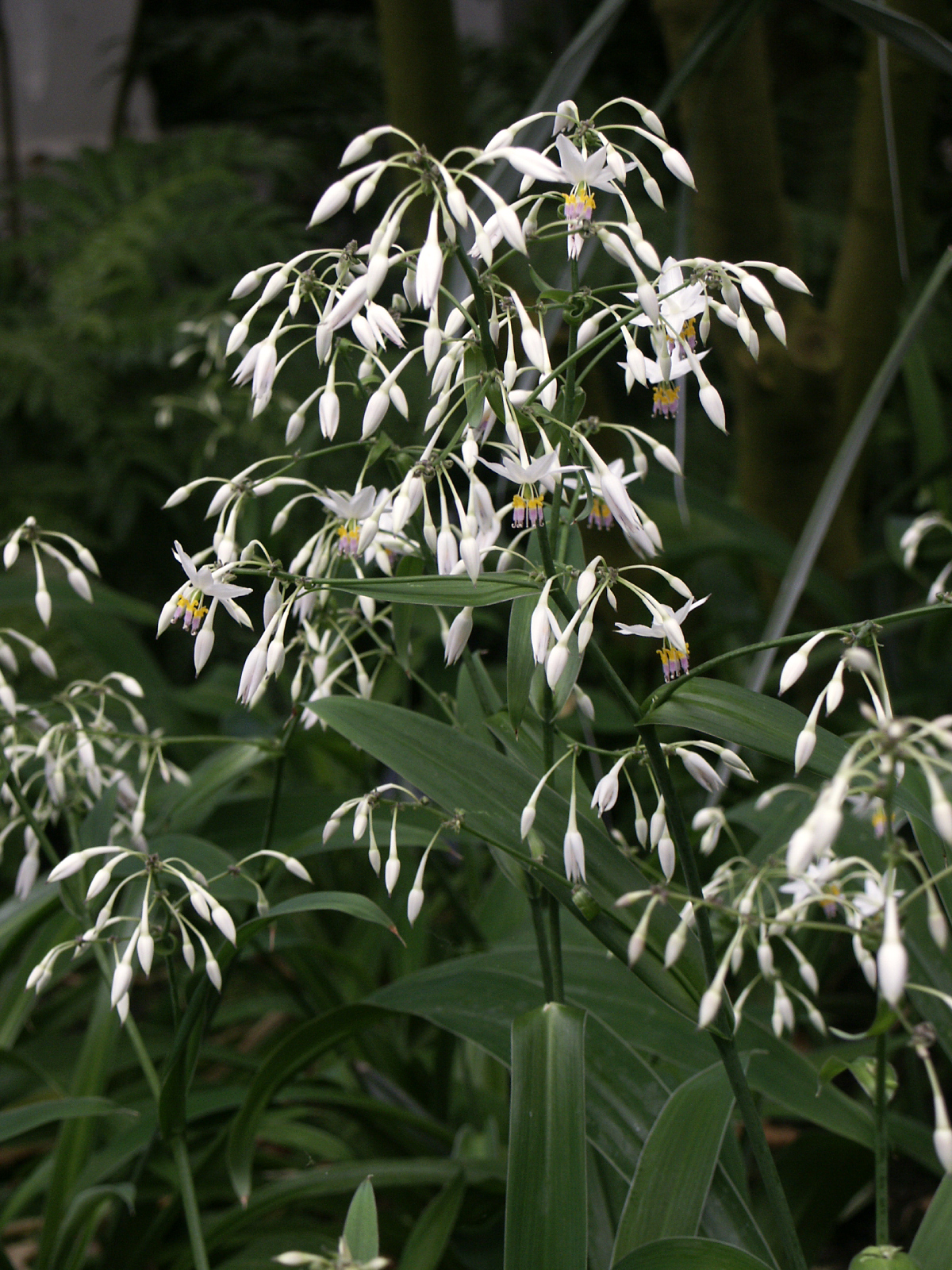
- Arthropodium cirratum

Scientific classification
- Kingdom: Plantae
- Clade: Tracheophytes
- Clade: Angiosperms
- Clade: Monocots
- Order: Asparagales
- Family: Asparagaceae
- Subfamily: Lomandroideae
- Genus: Arthropodium; R. Br.

Species
- See text

= Arthropodium =

Genus of flowering plants

Arthropodium is a genus of herbaceous perennial plants in the subfamily Lomandroideae of the family Asparagaceae. Members of this genus are native to Australia, New Zealand, New Caledonia, and Madagascar.

== Taxonomy ==
=== Accepted species ===
Species accepted as of July 2014 are:

- Arthropodium bifurcatum Heenan, A.D.Mitch. & de Lange – New Zealand North Island
- Arthropodium caesioides H.Perrier – Madagascar
- Arthropodium candidum Raoul – New Zealand North and South Islands
- Arthropodium cirratum (G.Forst.) R.Br. – rengarenga, renga lily, New Zealand rock lily, or maikaika – New Zealand North and South Islands
- Arthropodium curvipes S.Moore – Western Australia
- Arthropodium dyeri (Domin) Brittan – Western Australia
- Arthropodium milleflorum (Redouté) J.F.Macbr. – pale vanilla lily – New South Wales, Victoria, South Australia, Tasmania
- Arthropodium minus R.Br. – small vanilla lily – New South Wales, Victoria, South Australia, Tasmania
- Arthropodium neocaledonicum Baker – New Caledonia

=== Formerly included species ===
- Arthropodium fimbriatum R.Br. – see Dichopogon fimbriatus
- Arthropodium strictum R.Br. – chocolate lily – see Dichopogon strictus

== Human uses ==
The rhizomes of some species can be eaten as root vegetables, including A. cirratum, A. milleflorum, A. minus, and A. strictum. A. cirratum is native to New Zealand, where it may once have been farmed. It is used for medicine as well as food, and has symbolic importance in traditional Māori culture.

== See also ==
- List of plants known as lily
