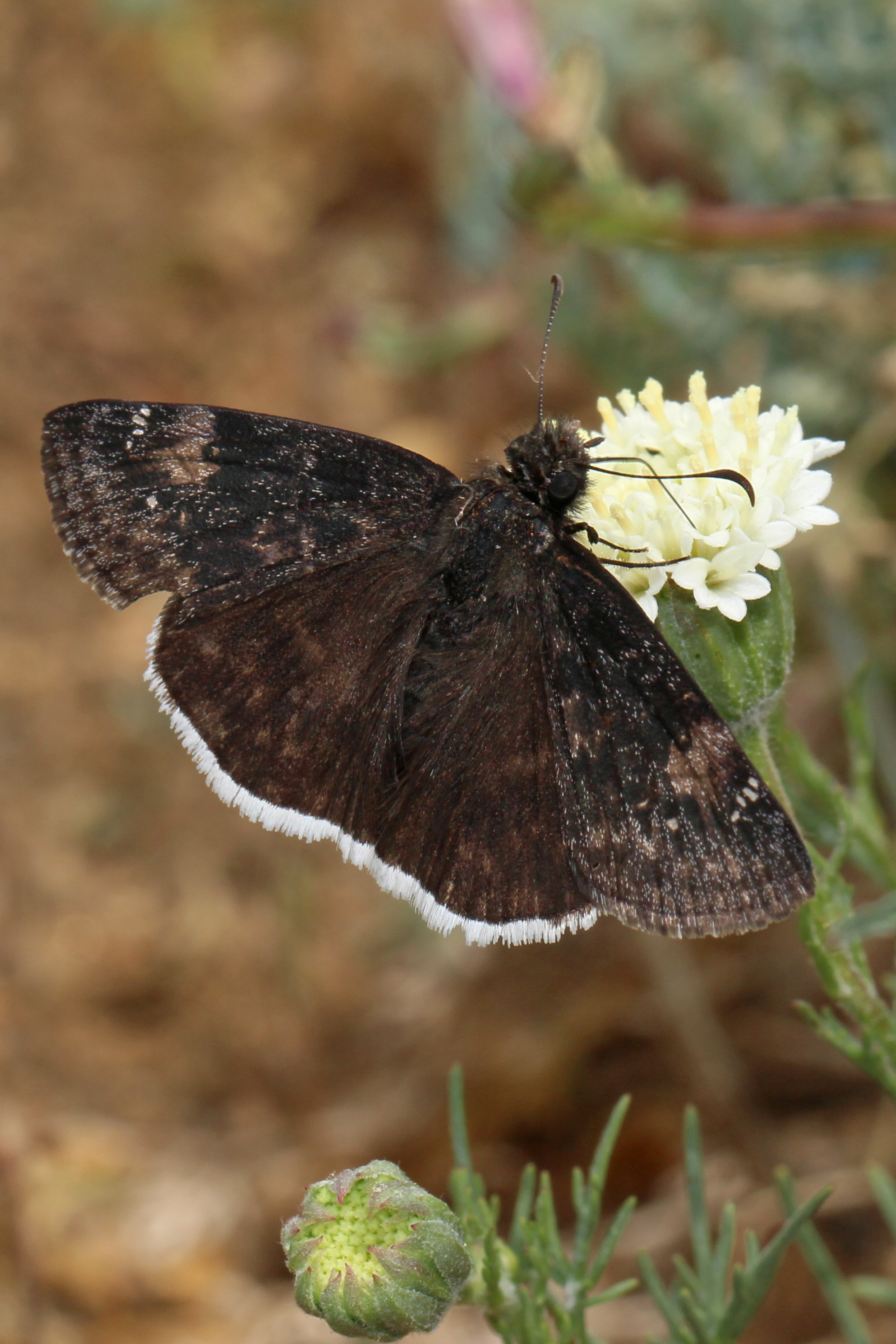
- Erynnis funeralis feeding on Chaenactis fremontii

Scientific classification
- Kingdom: Animalia
- Phylum: Arthropoda
- Clade: Pancrustacea
- Class: Insecta
- Order: Lepidoptera
- Family: Hesperiidae
- Genus: Erynnis
- Species: E. funeralis

Binomial name
- Erynnis funeralis (Scudder & Burgess, 1870)

Synonyms
- List: Nisoniades funeralis Scudder & Burgess, 1870; Helias clericalis Burmeister, 1875; Nisoniades australis Mabille, 1883; Phlebodes clericalis Burmeister, 1878; Thanaos funeralis Godman & Salvin, [1899]

= Erynnis funeralis =

Funereal duskywing

Species of butterfly

Erynnis funeralis, commonly known as the funereal duskywing, is a species of butterfly of the family Hesperiidae. It is found from southern United States (California, Arizona, New Mexico and Texas), south to Argentina and Chile. Strays can be found north up to northern Illinois, north-eastern Nebraska, central Colorado, southern Nevada and central California.

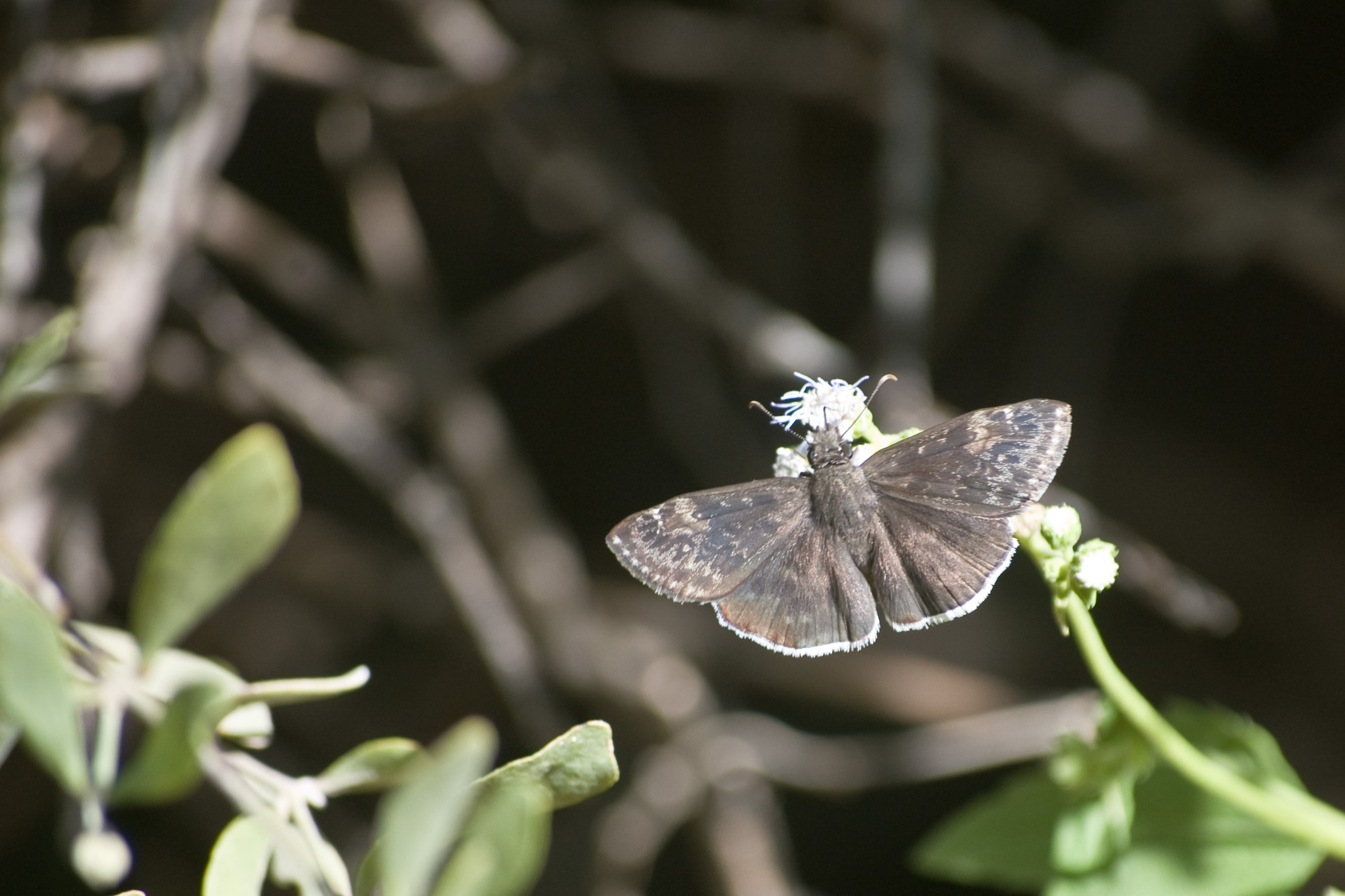
Funereal duskywing in Tucson, Arizona

The wingspan is 34–45 mm. They are very similar to the mournful duskywing, but can be distinguished by narrower fore wing with a light brown patch along outer edge. Their wings are black and brown with a white fringe on the hind wings. Adults are seen from February to October.

The larvae have a black head and a green body with yellow hairs and yellow markings. Its host plant is often Medicago sativa. Other plants the larvae feed on include Robinia neomexicana, Medicago hispida, Acmispon glaber, Olneya tesota, Vicia, and Acmispon. Adults feed on flower nectar.
