= List of butterflies of North America (Riodinidae) =

== Subfamily Riodininae: metalmarks ==
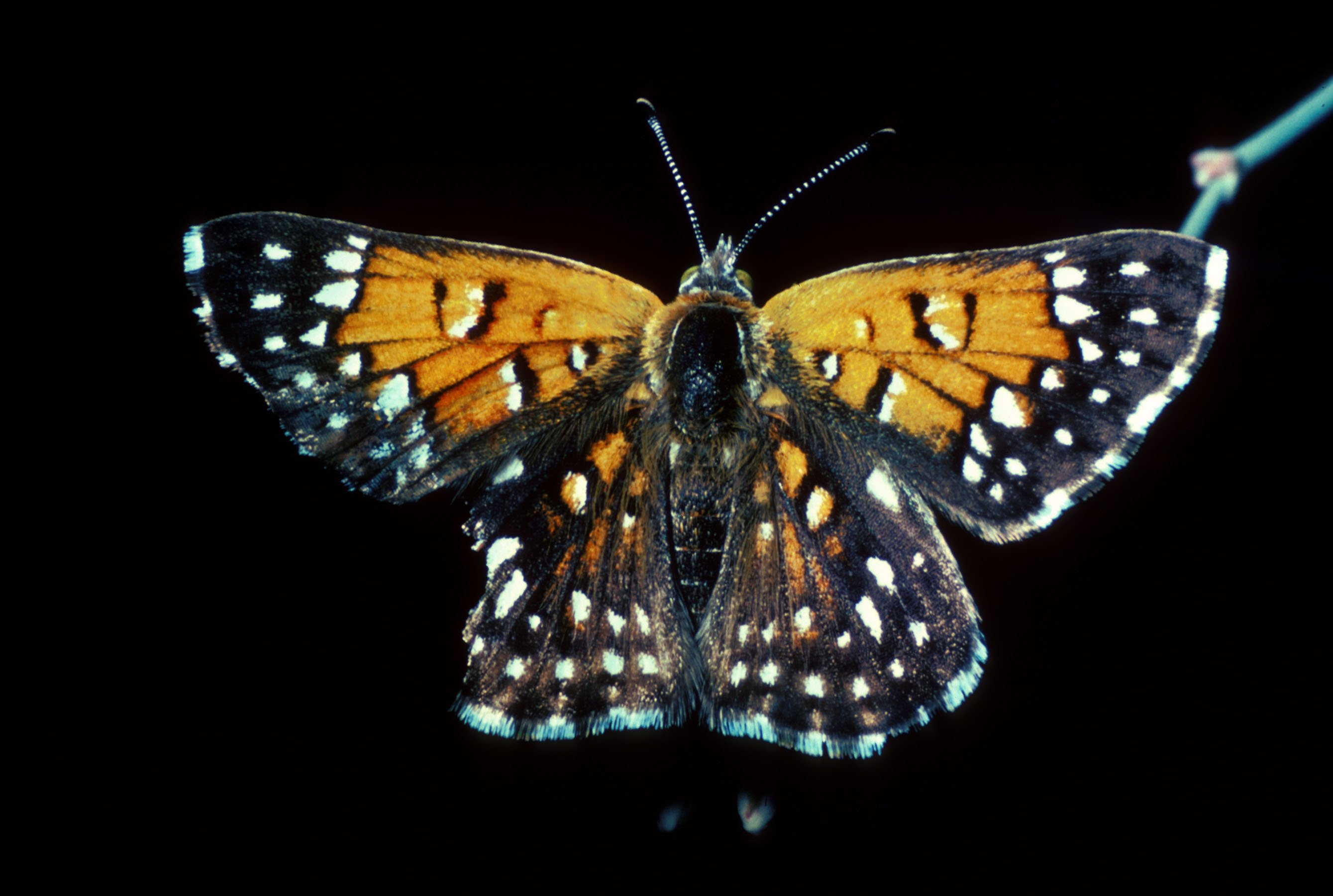
Lange's Mormon metalmark, Apodemia mormo langei

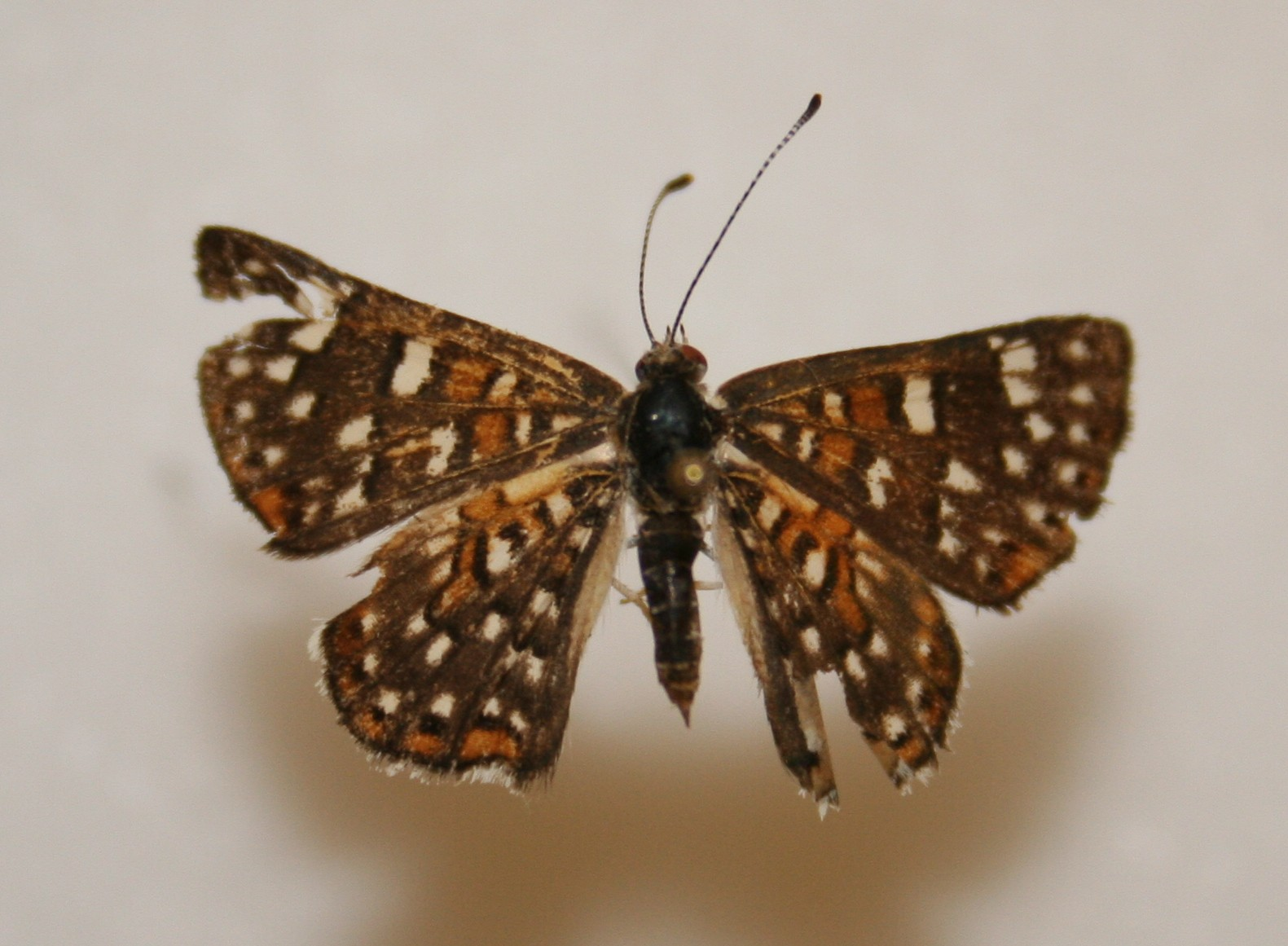
Palmer's metalmark, Apodemia palmeri

- Little metalmark, Calephelis virginiensis
- Northern metalmark, Calephelis borealis
- Fatal metalmark, Calephelis nemesis
- Rounded metalmark, Calephelis perditalis
- Wright's metalmark, Calephelis wrighti
- Swamp metalmark, Calephelis mutica
- Rawson's metalmark, Calephelis rawsoni
  - Rawson's Rawson's metalmark, Calephelis rawsoni rawsoni
  - Freeman's Rawson's metalmark, Calephelis rawsoni freemani
- Arizona metalmark, Calephelis arizonensis
- Red-bordered metalmark, Caria ino
- Blue metalmark, Lasaia sula
- Black-patched bluemark, Lasaia agesilas
- Gray bluemark, Lasaia maria
- Red-bordered pixie, Melanis pixe
- Common jewelmark, Sarota chrysus
- Carousing jewelmark, Anteros carausius
- Zela metalmark, Emesis zela
- Ares metalmark, Emesis ares
- Veracruz tanmark, Emesis vulpina
- Curve-winged metalmark, Emesis emesia
- Falcate metalmark, Emesis tenedia
- Mormon metalmark, Apodemia mormo
  - Apodemia mormo virgulti
  - Apodemia mormo mejicanus
  - Apodemia mormo duryi
  - Lange's Mormon metalmark, Apodemia mormo langei
- Narrow-winged metalmark, Apodemia multiplaga
- Hepburn's metalmark, Apodemia hepburni
- Palmer's metalmark, Apodemia palmeri
- Walker's metalmark, Apodemia walkeri
- Crescent metalmark, Apodemia phyciodoides
- Nais metalmark, Apodemia nais
  - Nais nais metalmark, Apodemia nais nais
  - Chisos nais metalmark, Apodemia nais chisosensis
- Sealpoint metalmark, Apodemia hypoglauca
