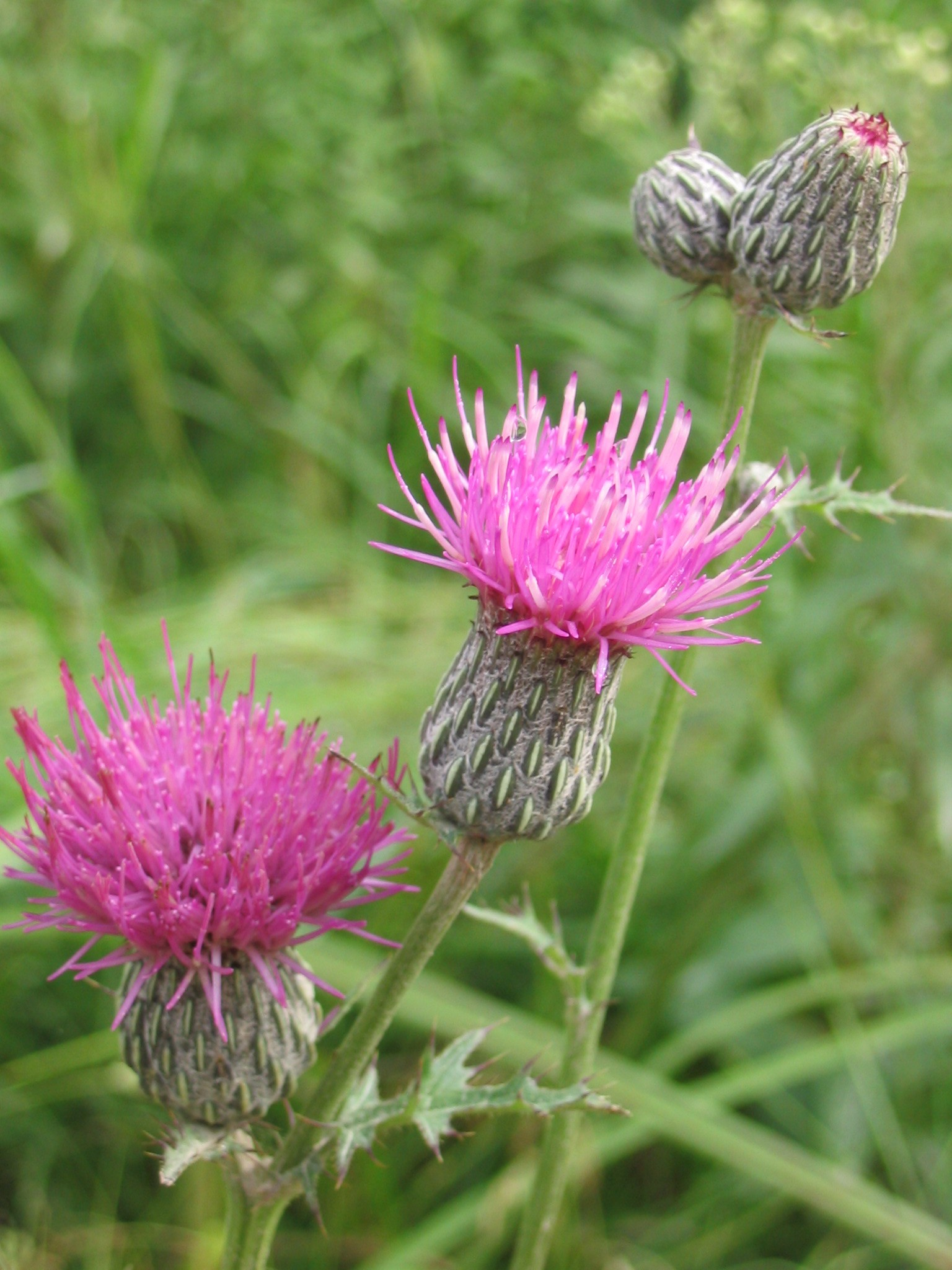

Conservation status
- Secure (NatureServe)

Scientific classification
- Kingdom: Plantae
- Clade: Embryophytes
- Clade: Tracheophytes
- Clade: Spermatophytes
- Clade: Angiosperms
- Clade: Eudicots
- Clade: Asterids
- Order: Asterales
- Family: Asteraceae
- Genus: Cirsium
- Species: C. muticum

Binomial name
- Cirsium muticum Michx.

Synonyms
- Synonymy: Carduus glutinosus Beck; Carduus muticus (Michx.) Pers.; Cirsium bigelovii DC.; Cirsium bigelowii DC.; Cnicus glaber Nutt.; Cnicus glutinosus Bigelow; Cnicus muticus Elliott; Cnicus muticus (Michx.) Pursh

= Cirsium muticum =

Species of thistle

Cirsium muticum, also known as swamp thistle, marsh thistle, dunce-nettle, or horsetops, is a North American species of plants in the family Asteraceae, native to central and eastern Canada and the central and eastern United States.

== Description ==
Cirsium muticum is a biennial plant that reaches a height of 180 centimetres (71 in). Its taproot is fleshy and its stem is ridged with hairs toward the base. The leaves are alternate in position, pinnately lobed, and ovate in shape. The leaf lobes are often asymmetrical and forked irregularly with the angles containing fine trichomes (multicellular hairs). The leaves become progressively smaller towards the inflorescence; there are often a few trichomes on the underside. The peduncles are 0–15 cm (0.0–5.9 in), each with an inflorescence made up of many tiny florets; the involucre has cobwebby white hairs, and it is often slightly sticky. The purple florets can be up to 27 mm (1.1 in) long.

== Taxonomy and naming ==
Cirsium muticum was described by the French naturalist André Michaux in 1803. It is one of many species in the thistle genus Cirsium. The epithet muticum, meaning blunt, refers to its phyllaries.

== Distribution and habitat ==
Cirsium muticum has been found across every province of Canada from Labrador and Newfoundland to Saskatchewan. In the United States, it grows primarily in the Northeast, the Great Lakes region, and the Appalachians, with isolated populations scattered across the South from Texas to the Carolinas.

Cirsium muticum is found mostly in alkaline swamps, wetlands, marshes and low forests but some races have been known to grow in wet alpine climates.

== Ecology ==
Cirsium muticum is as host for some species of butterflies and moths, including the swamp metalmark butterfly (Calephelis muticum), a species that is currently undergoing risk assessment in the United States. The butterfly lays its eggs on the swamp thistle, and when the eggs hatch, the flowers are the only food source for the caterpillars. It is also a larval host to the painted lady butterfly, and songbirds eat its seeds. Species that grow with it include Aster umbellatus (flat-topped white aster), Solidago patula (rough-leaved goldenrod), Lysimachia quadrifolia (prairie loosestrife), and Gentiana procera (smaller fringed gentian).

== Human importance ==
Swamp thistles can be used to make decorative arrangements. They are often planted in gardens because they are seen as more manageable than other thistles, while still potentially having some anti-herbivory properties.

== Conservation ==
The plant is not endangered in Canada or the U.S. but it is threatened in the state of Arkansas, and vulnerable in the province of Saskatchewan. Cirsium muticum is at risk primarily because it is a wetland plant, and North American wetlands have been much reduced in extent over the last two centuries.

== External sources ==
- Morse, K. (2009). "Cirsium muticum –Swamp Thistle". Archived from the original on 2012-04-22.
