= Caria (disambiguation) =

Caria was an ancient region of Asia Minor.

Caria may also refer to:

- Caria (Moimenta da Beira), a parish in Moimenta da Beira, Portugal
- Caria, a parish in Belmonte, Portugal
- Caria (butterfly), a genus of metalmark butterflies in the tribe Riodinini

== See also ==
- Carya
