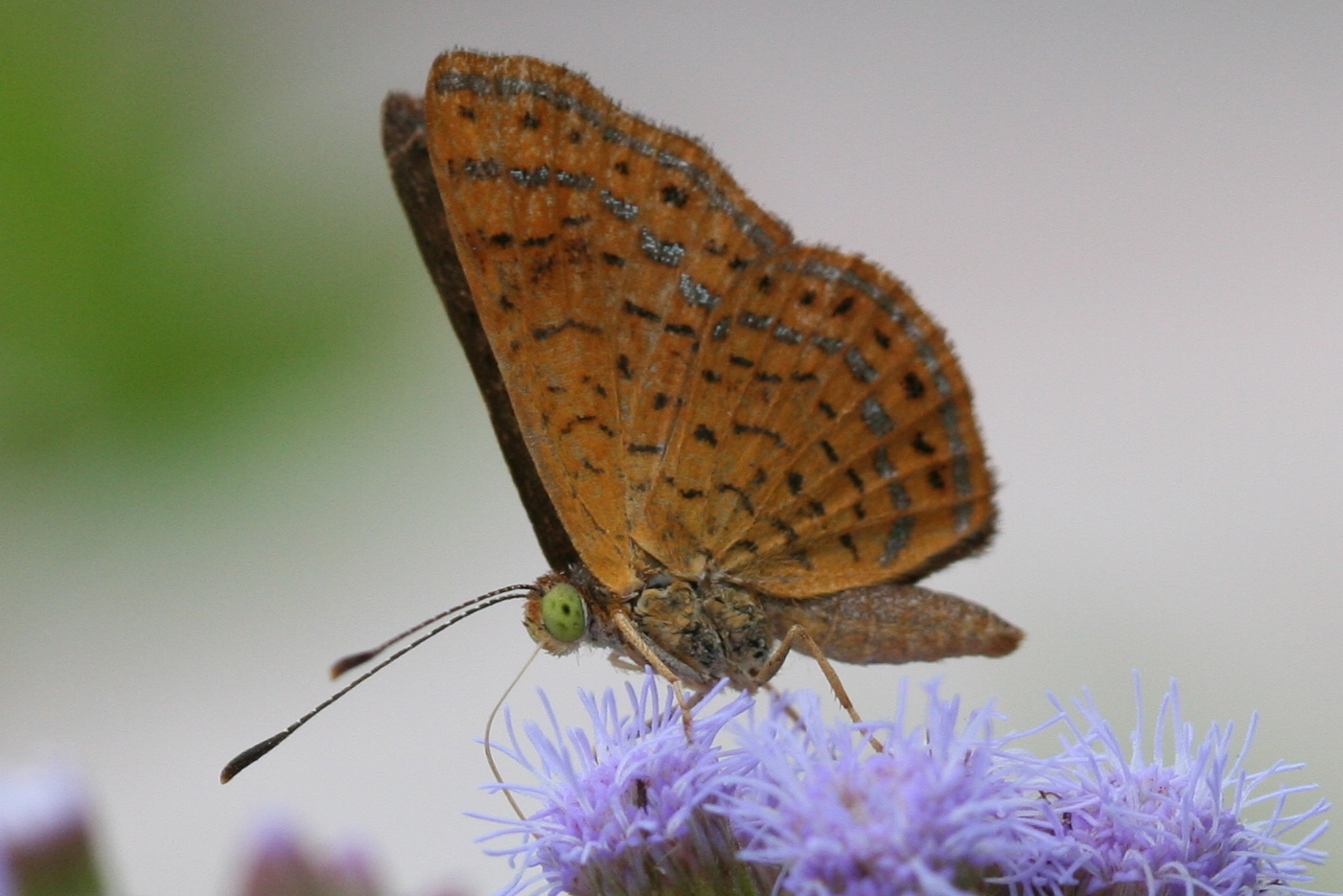
- Calephelis nemesis

Scientific classification
- Domain: Eukaryota
- Kingdom: Animalia
- Phylum: Arthropoda
- Class: Insecta
- Order: Lepidoptera
- Family: Riodinidae
- Tribe: Riodinini
- Genus: Calephelis; Grote and Robinson, 1869

Species
- See text

Synonyms
- Lephelisca Barnes & Lindsey, 1922

= Calephelis =

Genus of butterflies

Calephelis is a genus of butterflies that belongs to the family Riodinidae. They are resident in the Americas, with 43 species in the Neotropical regions and 11 species in the Nearctic.

== Larva host plants ==
Species of Calephelis feed on the Asteraceae, Ranunculaceae, Euphorbiaceae, and Bromeliaceae. Recorded larval host plants are in the genera Packera, Parthenium, Mikania, Cirsium, Baccharis, Clematis, Encelia, Eupatorium, Ageratina, Bebbia, Acalypha, Bromelia, Chromolaena, Calea, Fleischmannia, and Verbesina.

== Species list ==
- Calephelis acapulcoensis McAlpine, 1971 Mexico
- Calephelis argyrodines (Bates, 1866) Mexico, Guatemala, Costa Rica
- Calephelis arizonensis McAlpine, 1971 Arizona
- Calephelis aymaran McAlpine, 1971 Bolivia, Peru, Chile, Paraguay, Argentina, Brazil
- Calephelis azteca McAlpine, 1971 Mexico
- Calephelis bajaensis McAlpine, 1971 Baja California
- Calephelis borealis (Grote & Robinson, 1866) New York, New Jersey, Virginia, Kentucky, Ohio, Indiana, Missouri
- Calephelis braziliensis McAlpine, 1971 Brazil
- Calephelis browni McAlpine, 1971 Guatemala, Costa Rica, Panama, Nicaragua, Honduras, Salvador
- Calephelis burgeri McAlpine, 1971 Colombia
- Calephelis candiope (Druce, 1904) Colombia
- Calephelis clenchi McAlpine, 1971 Guatemala
- Calephelis costaricola Strand, 1916 Mexico, Honduras, Panama
- Calephelis dreisbachi McAlpine, 1971 Arizona, Mexico
- Calephelis exiguus Austin, 1993 Costa Rica
- Calephelis freemani McAlpine, 1971 Texas
- Calephelis fulmen Stichel, 1910 Mexico to Panama
- Calephelis guatemala McAlpine, 1971 Guatemala
- Calephelis huasteca McAlpine, 1971 Mexico
- Calephelis inca McAlpine, 1971 Costa Rica to Brazil
- Calephelis iris (Staudinger, 1876) Panama, Costa Rica, Guatemala, Colombia
- Calephelis laverna (Godman & Salvin, [1886]) Mexico, Panama, Costa Rica, Trinidad, Colombia, Ecuador, Venezuela, northern Brazil
- Calephelis matheri McAlpine, 1971 Mexico
- Calephelis maya McAlpine, 1971 Mexico
- Calephelis mexicana McAlpine, 1971 Mexico
- Calephelis montezuma McAlpine, 1971 Mexico
- Calephelis muticum McAlpine, 1937 Pennsylvania, Great Lakes states, Minnesota
- Calephelis nemesis (Edwards, 1871) New Mexico, Arizona, Texas, California
- Calephelis nilus (C. & R. Felder, 1861) Venezuela
- Calephelis perditalis Barnes & McDunnough, 1918 Arizona, Texas, Mexico, Central America, Venezuela
- Calephelis rawsoni McAlpine, 1939 Arizona, Texas, Mexico
- Calephelis sacapulas McAlpine, 1971 Guatemala
- Calephelis schausi McAlpine, 1971 Honduras, Panama
- Calephelis sinaloensis McAlpine, 1971 Mexico
- Calephelis sixola McAlpine, 1971 Costa Rica, Panama
- Calephelis sodalis Austin, 1993 Costa Rica, Panama
- Calephelis stallingsi McAlpine, 1971 Mexico, British Honduras, Guatemala
- Calephelis tikal Austin, 1993 Guatemala
- Calephelis tapuyo McAlpine, 1971 Orosi, Brazil
- Calephelis velutina (Godman & Salvin, 1878) Mexico - Columbia
- Calephelis virginiensis (Guérin-Méneville, 1831) Virginia, Florida, Texas, Arkansas
- Calephelis wellingi McAlpine, 1971 Mexico, Guatemala
- Calephelis wrighti Holland, 1930 California, Arizona, Texas, Mexico
- Calephelis yautepequensis R. G. Maza & Turrent, 1977 Mexico
- Calephelis yucatana McAlpine, 1971 Mexico
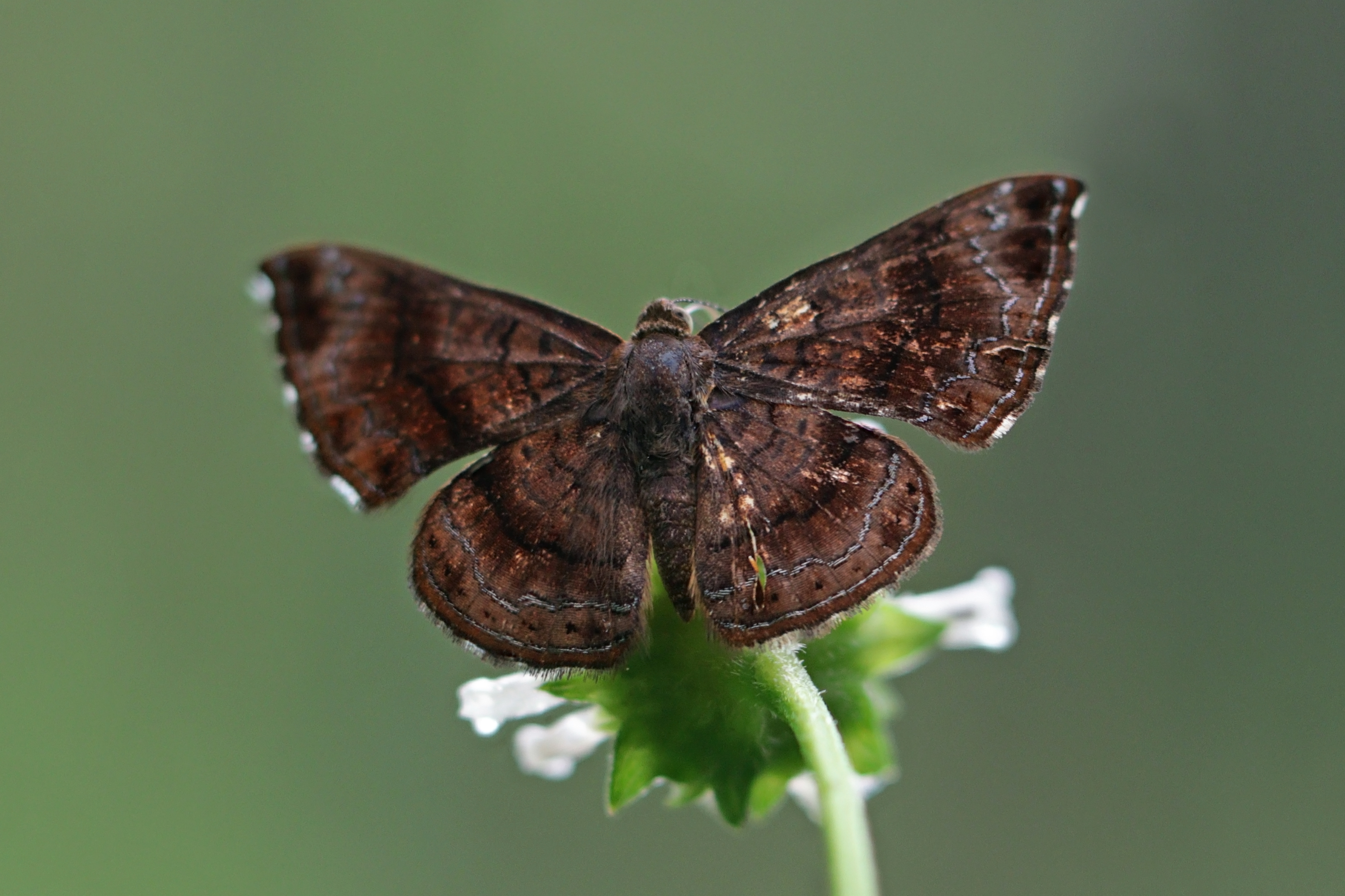
C. fulmen
Fulmen calephelis

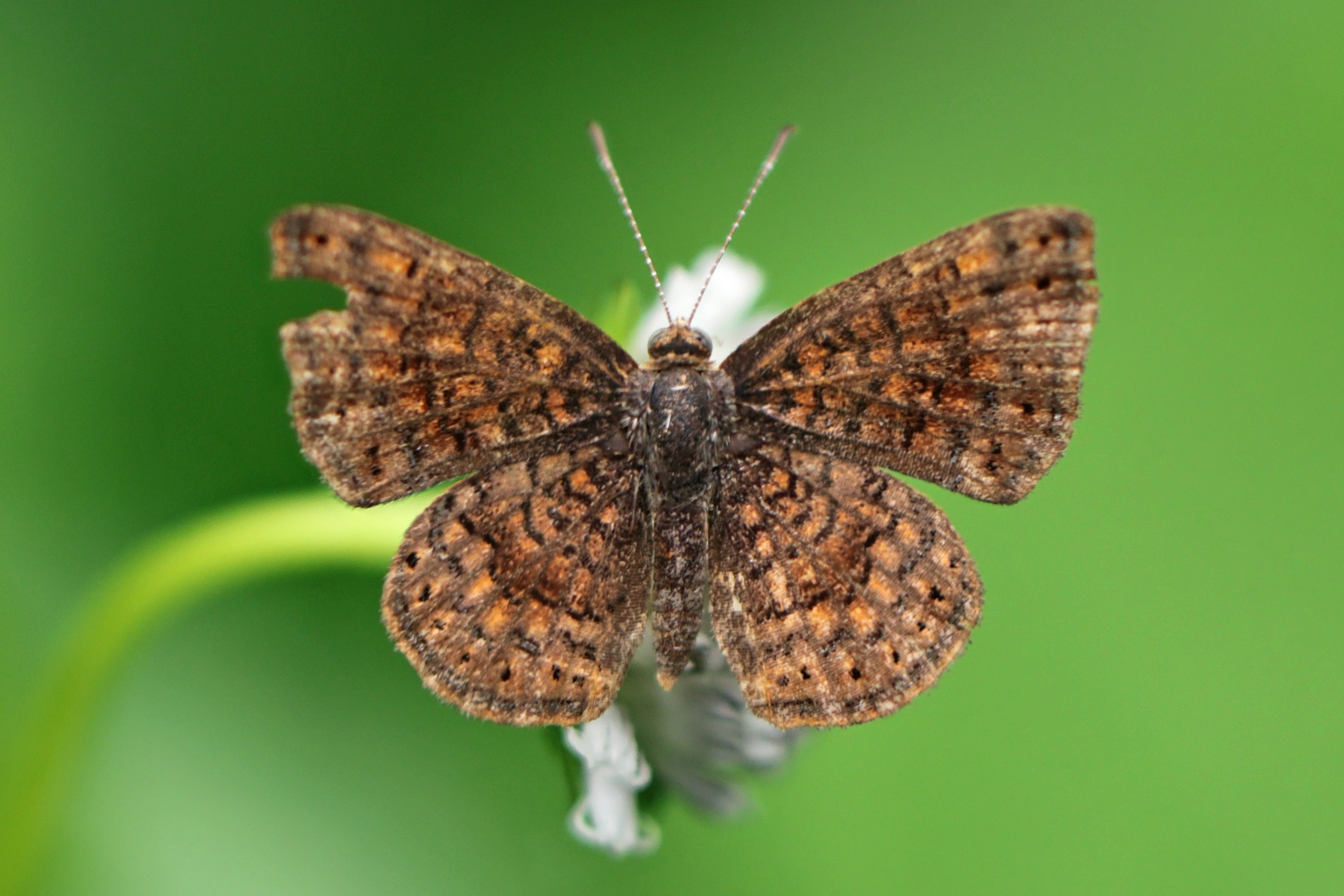
C. schausi
Schaus' calephelis, female

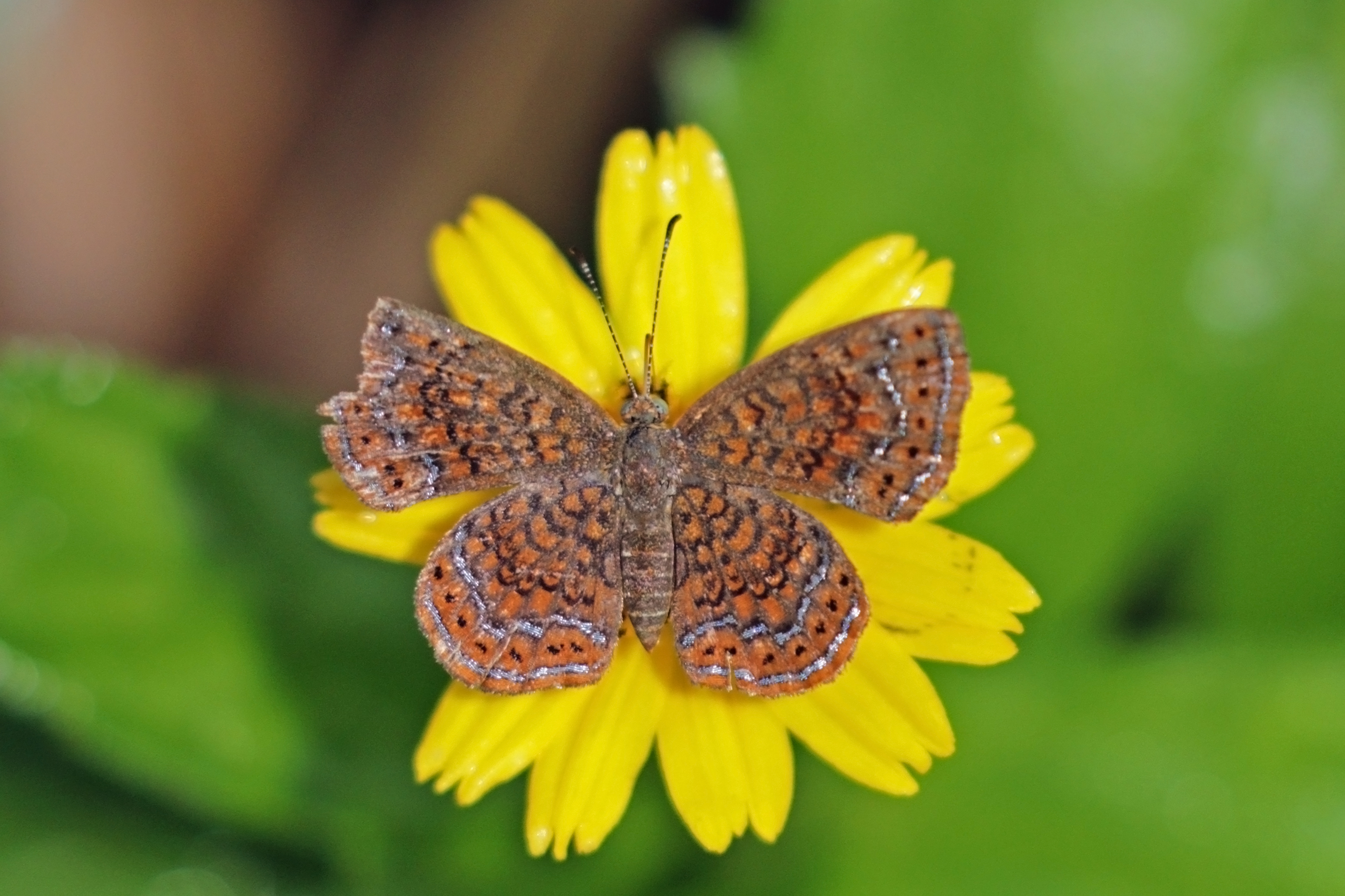
C. schausi
Schaus' calephelis

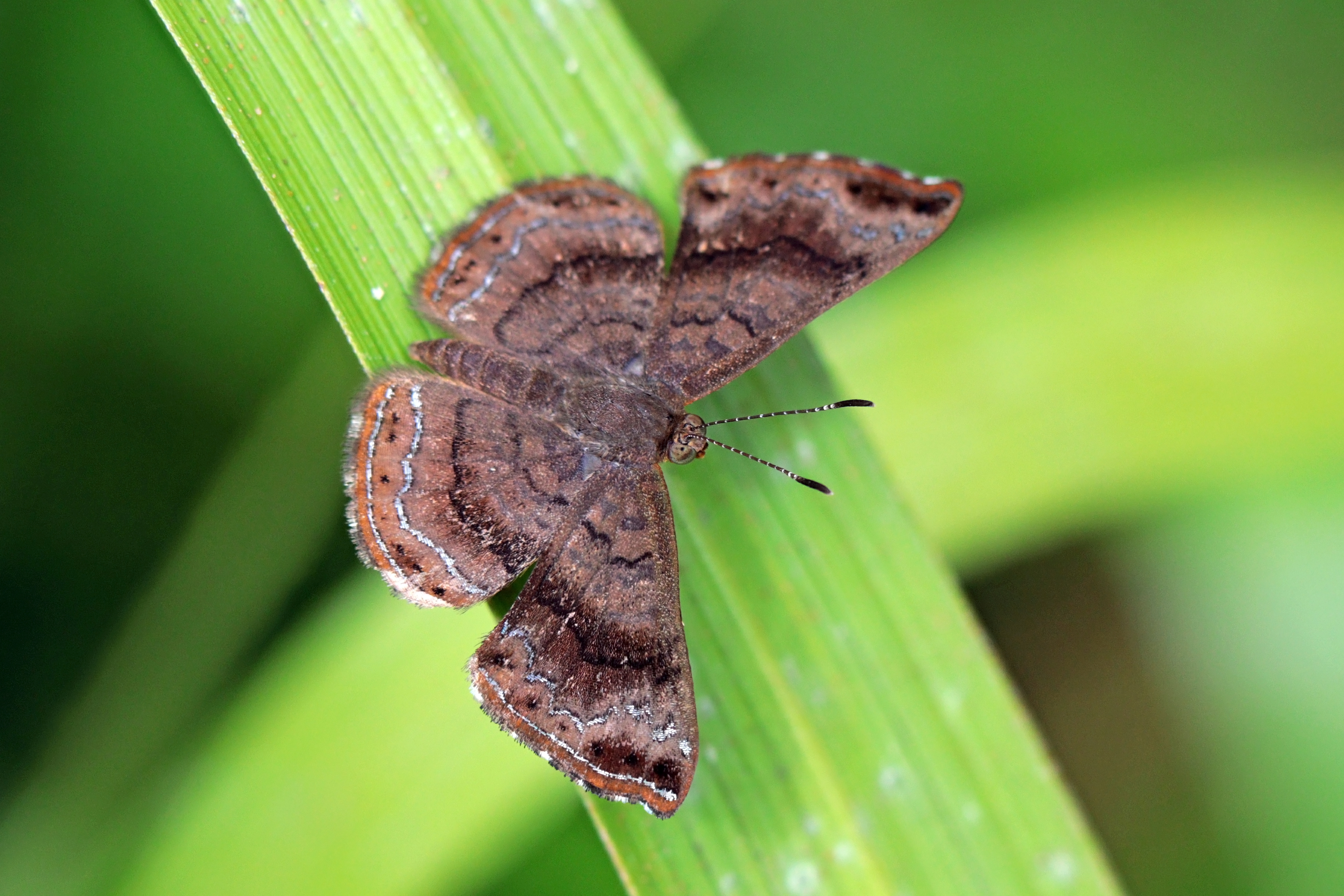
C. sixola
Greater scintillant

=== References ===
- Calephelis
