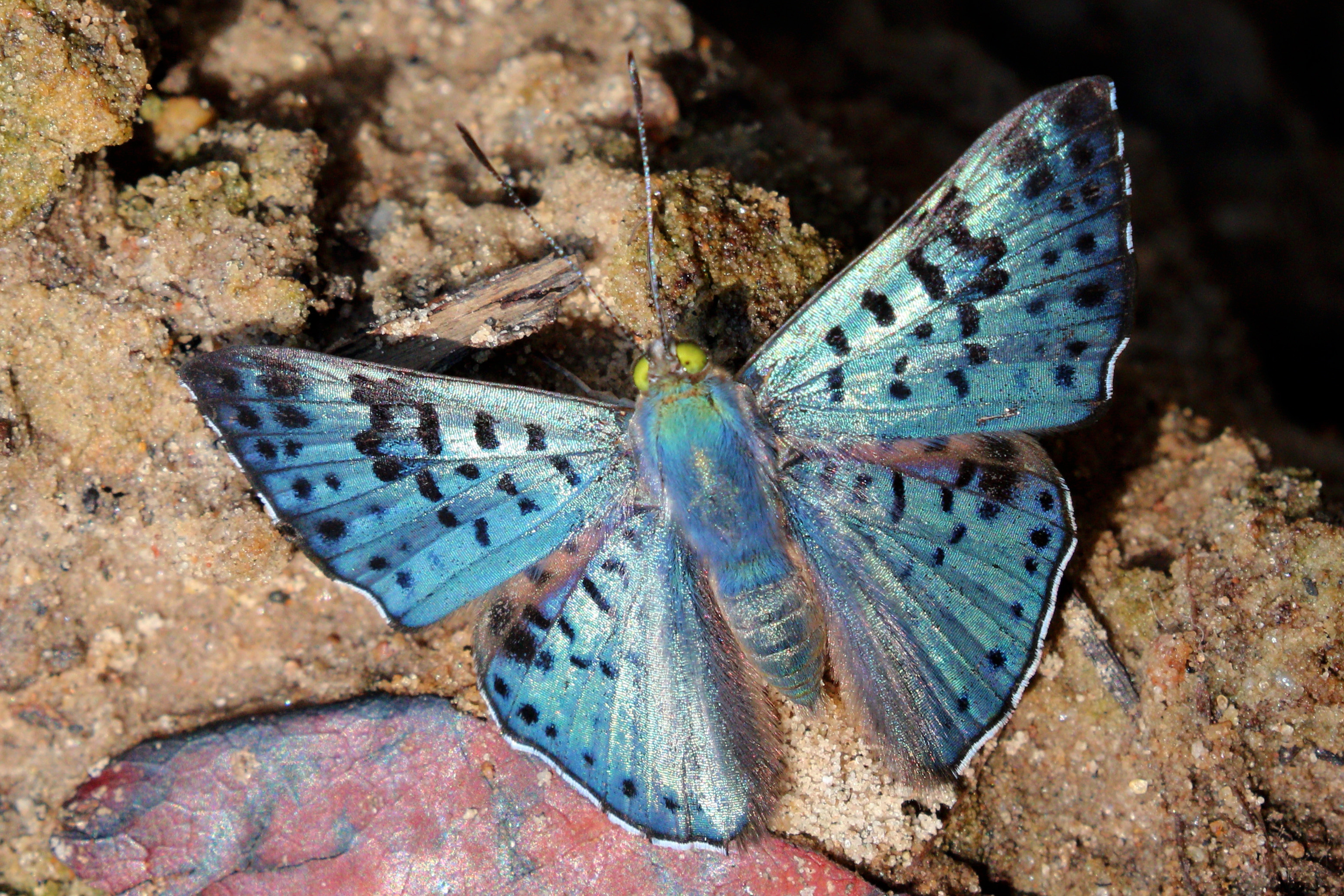
- Lasaia agesilas

Scientific classification
- Kingdom: Animalia
- Phylum: Arthropoda
- Class: Insecta
- Order: Lepidoptera
- Family: Riodinidae
- Subfamily: Riodininae
- Tribe: Riodinini
- Genus: Lasaia; H. Bates, 1868

= Lasaia =

Genus of butterflies

Lasaia is a genus of metalmark butterflies in the family Riodinidae. The genus was erected by Henry Walter Bates in 1868. There are about 13 described species in Lasaia, found in North, Central, and South America.

== Species ==
These species belong to the genus Lasaia:

- Lasaia aerugo Clench, 1972
- Lasaia agesilas (Latreille, 1813)
- Lasaia arsis Staudinger, 1888
- Lasaia incoides (Schaus, 1902)
- Lasaia maria Clench, 1971
- Lasaia meris Cramer, 1781
- Lasaia moeros Staudinger, 1888
- Lasaia narses Staudinger, 1888
- Lasaia oileus Godman, 1903
- Lasaia pallida Grishin, 2024
- Lasaia peninsularis Clench, 1972
- Lasaia pseudomeris Clench, 1971
- Lasaia scotina Stichel, 1910
- Lasaia sessilis Schaus, 1890
- Lasaia sula Staudinger, 1888
