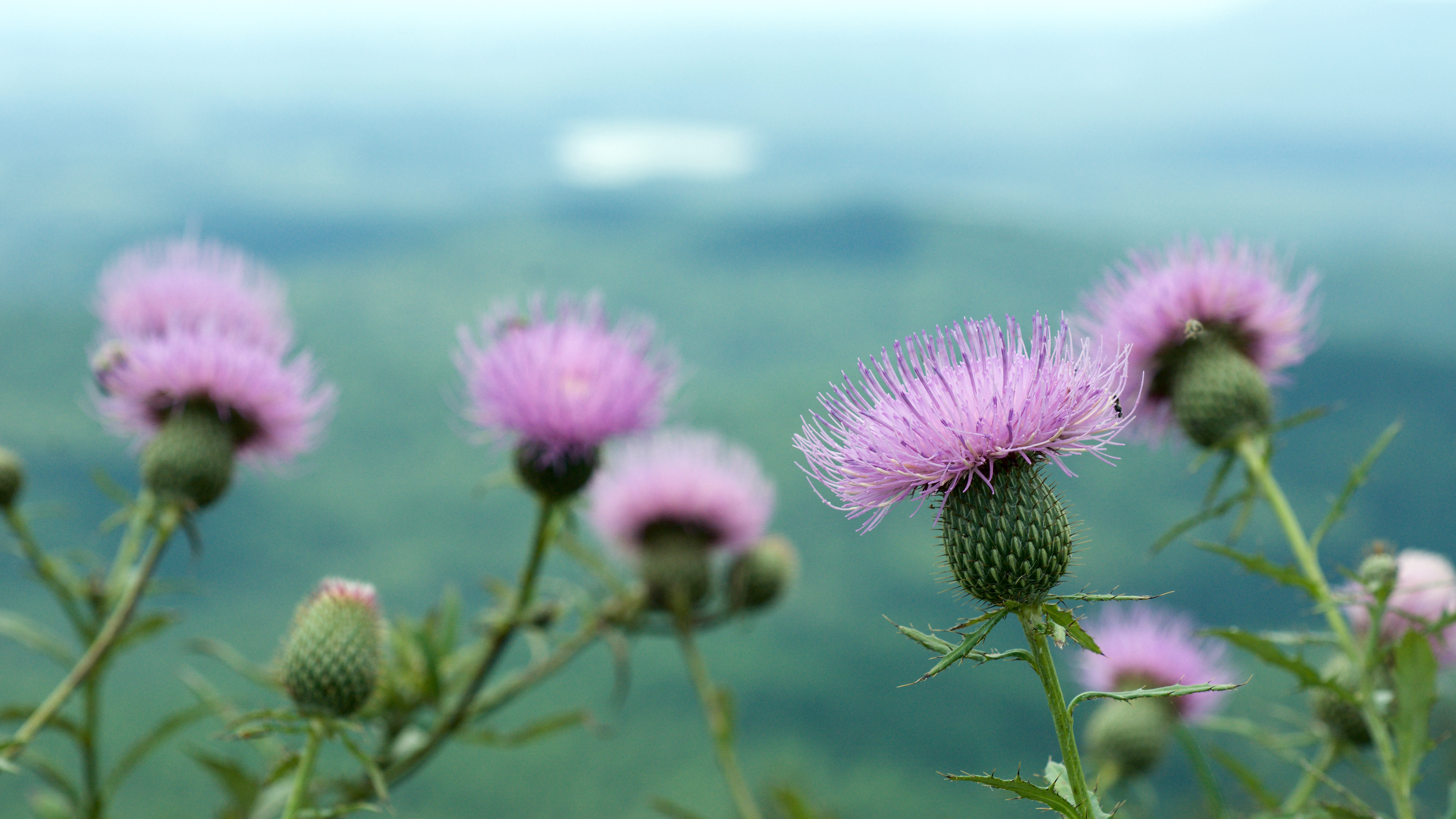

Conservation status
- Secure (NatureServe)

Scientific classification
- Kingdom: Plantae
- Clade: Tracheophytes
- Clade: Angiosperms
- Clade: Eudicots
- Clade: Asterids
- Order: Asterales
- Family: Asteraceae
- Genus: Cirsium
- Species: C. altissimum

Binomial name
- Cirsium altissimum (L.) Spreng.

Synonyms
- Carduus altissimus L.; Cirsium diversifolium DC.; Cnicus altissimus (L.) Willd.; Cnicus iowense Pammel

= Cirsium altissimum =

Species of plant

Cirsium altissimum is a North American species of plants in the tribe Cardueae within the family Asteraceae. Common names are tall thistle or roadside thistle. The species is native to the eastern and Central United States.

== Description ==
Cirsium altissimum is, as the name implies, a tall herb, sometimes reaching as much as 400 cm (13 ft) in sunny areas and 150 cm (5 ft) in the shade. It is a biennial or perennial plant, blooming only once before dying.

In its first year, the plant appears as a rosette of leaves, slightly hairy, with small spines along the leaf margins. The rosette measures up to about 30 cm (1 ft) across. The plant has a long slender taproot, measuring 15 cm (6 in) or more. In its second year, the plant starts as a rosette of leaves with longer hairs than the previous year, plus stout spines. In addition to the previous year's tap root, there are now shallow, sinewy, radiating roots. The second year plant grows tall, tough stems that are densely covered with stiff hairs. Large plants have some branches along the upper portion of their stems. The leaves along the stem are alternate and measure up to 23 cm (9 in) long and 8 cm (3 in) wide. Leaves vary in shape, with larger leaves generally lanceolate, and smaller leaves elliptic. They could be uncut to deeply pinnately lobed, varying from plant-to-plant and even on the same plant. There is often a spine at the pointed tip of each lobe or dentate tooth. Leaves have flattened white hairs on their upper surface and a dense mat of white-woolly hairs on their lower surface. They are sessile or clasp the stem slightly.

Sometimes there is only one flower head but more often there are more, with pink or purple (rarely white) disc florets but no ray florets. Flower heads are up to 5 cm (2 in) across.

== Etymology ==
The genus name Cirsium comes from the Greek word, kirsos, for "swollen vein" because the plants were previously used to reduce swelling. The specific epithet altissimum is Latin for "tallest".

== Distribution and habitat ==
C. altissimum has a native range in the United States extending from Massachusetts west to North Dakota and south to Texas and the Florida Panhandle. The species grows in prairies, open woodlands, and disturbed sites.

== Ecology ==
Flowers bloom June to October. It is an important nectar source for many bees, butterflies, and moths, and it is the larval host for the swamp metalmark (Calephelis muticum) and painted lady (Vanessa cardui) butterflies. Many birds, including the American goldfinch eat the seeds.
