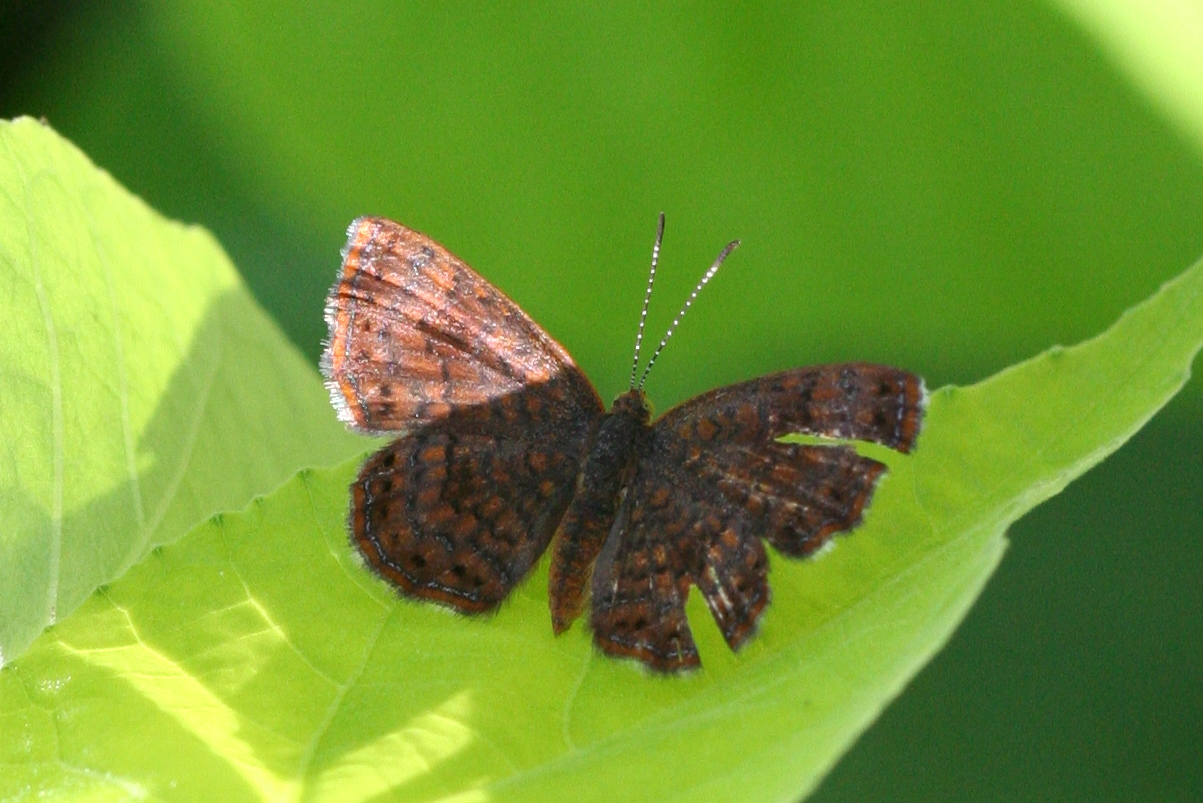

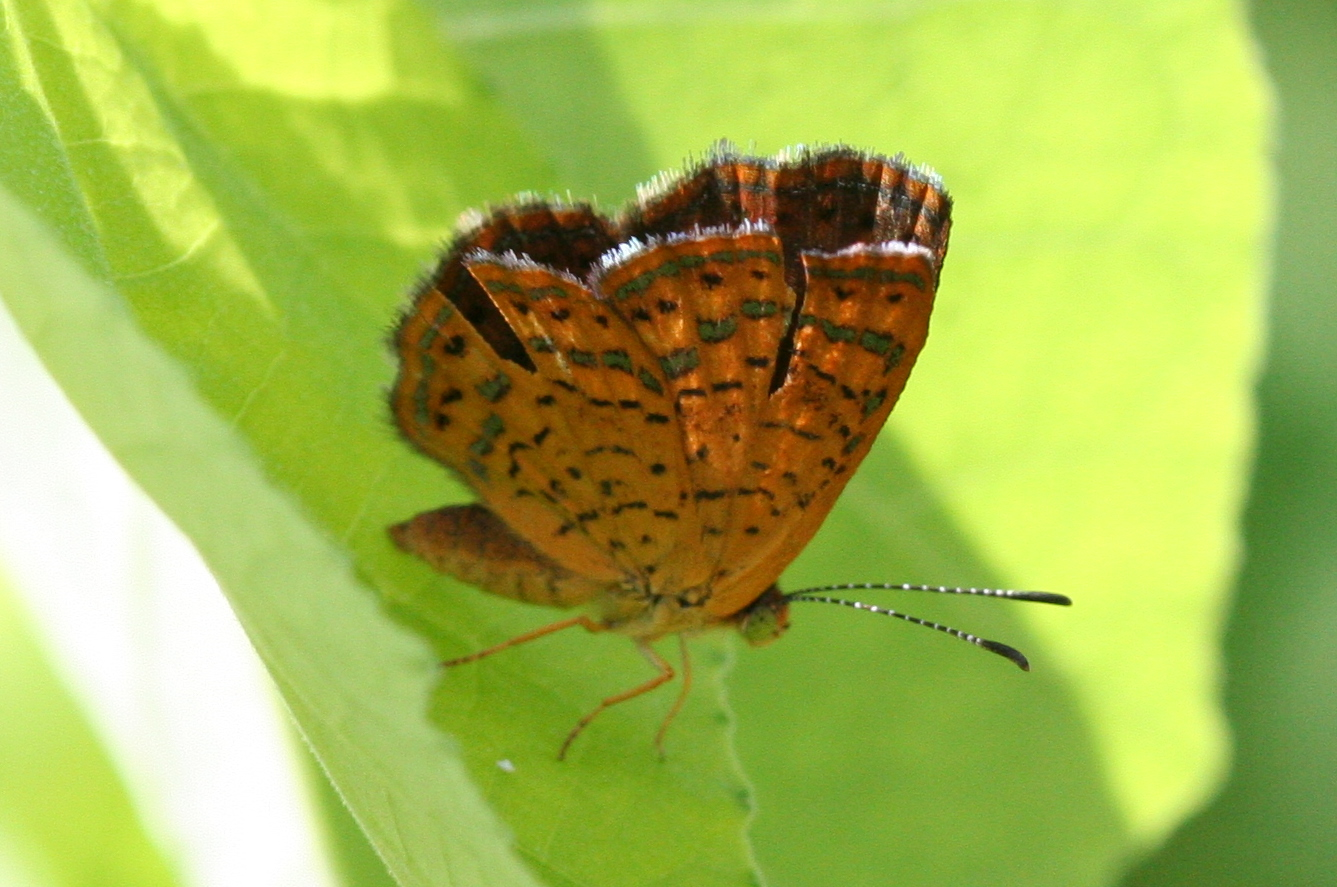

Scientific classification
- Domain: Eukaryota
- Kingdom: Animalia
- Phylum: Arthropoda
- Class: Insecta
- Order: Lepidoptera
- Family: Riodinidae
- Genus: Calephelis
- Species: C. perditalis

Binomial name
- Calephelis perditalis Barnes & McDunnough, 1918

= Calephelis perditalis =

Species of butterfly

Calephelis perditalis, also known as the rounded metalmark or lost metalmark, is a species of butterfly in the family Riodinidae. It is found in Texas in the United States and Mexico, south to Venezuela. The species was first described by William Barnes and James Halliday McDunnough in 1918.

The wingspan is 18–24 mm.

The larvae feed on Chromolaena odorata and Eupatorium glabratum.

== Subspecies ==
- Calephelis perditalis perditalis - Mexico, southern Texas
- Calephelis perditalis donahuei McAlpine, 1971 - Mexico
