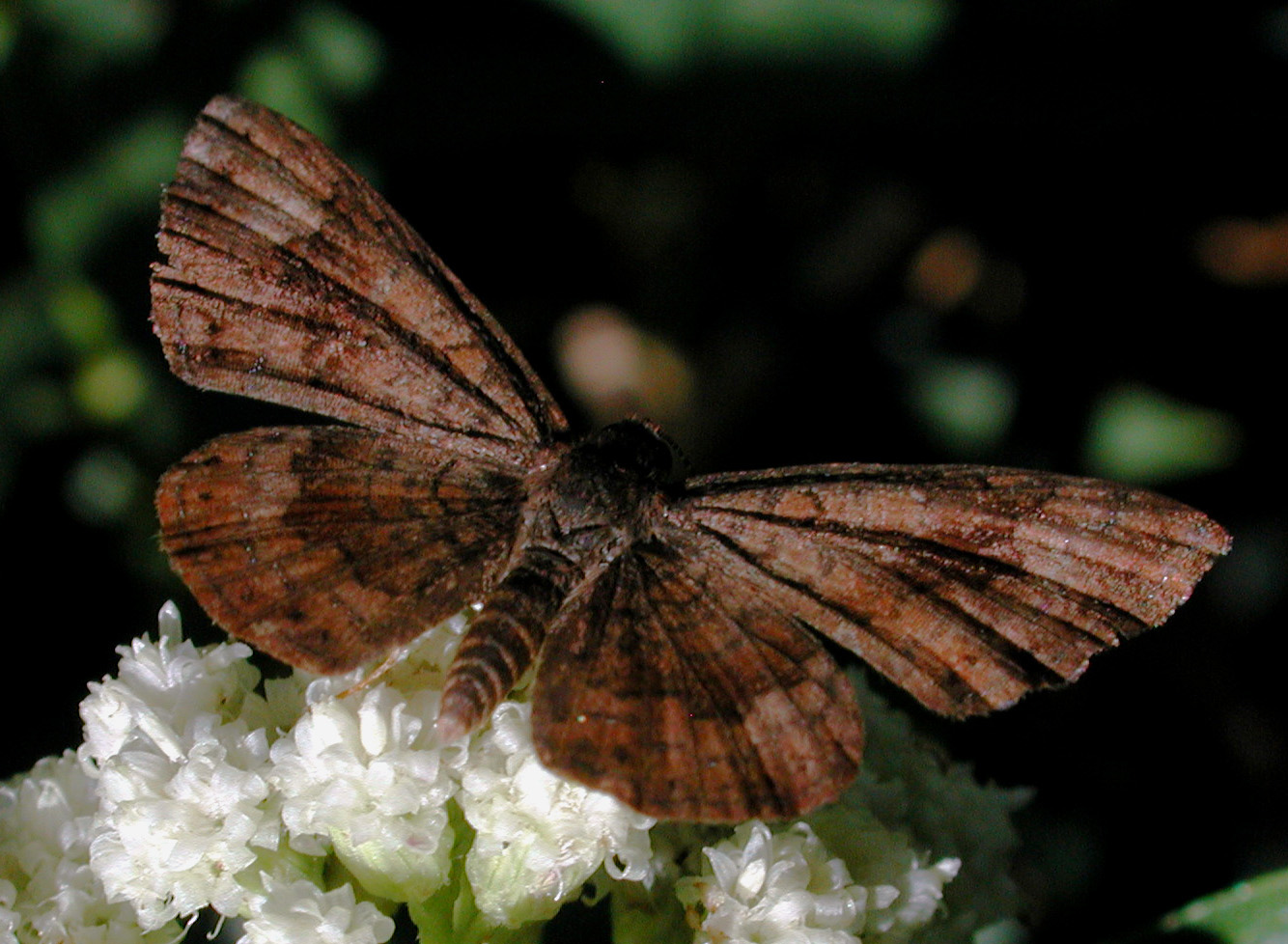

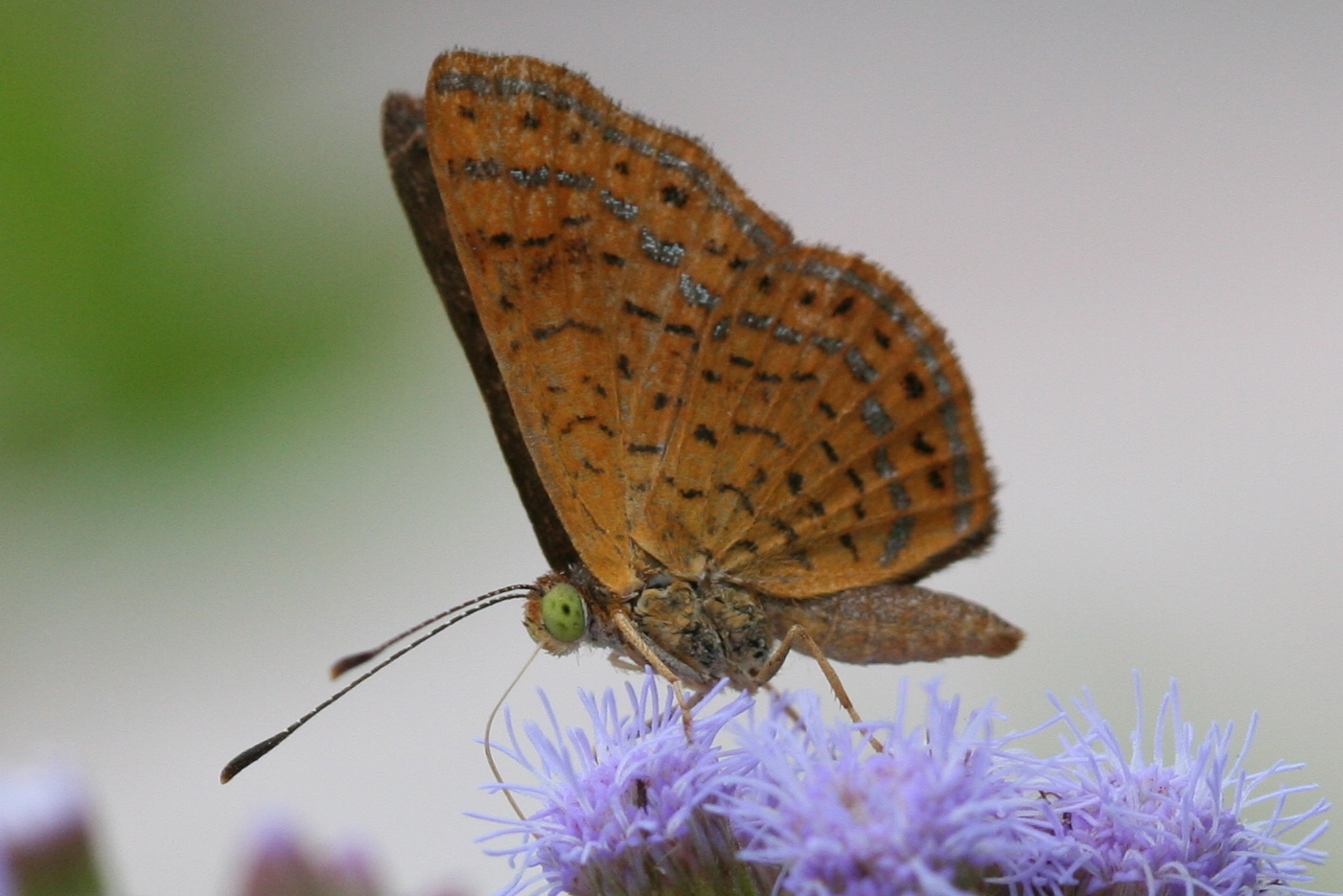

Scientific classification
- Domain: Eukaryota
- Kingdom: Animalia
- Phylum: Arthropoda
- Class: Insecta
- Order: Lepidoptera
- Family: Riodinidae
- Genus: Calephelis
- Species: C. nemesis

Binomial name
- Calephelis nemesis (W.H. Edwards, 1871)

Synonyms
- Charis nemesis W.H. Edwards, 1871; Emesis nemesis; Charis australis W.H. Edwards, 1877; Charis guadeloupe Strecker, [1878]

= Calephelis nemesis =

Species of butterfly

Calephelis nemesis (fatal metalmark or dusky metalmark) is a butterfly in the family Riodinidae. It is found in the southern part of the United States and Mexico. Its habitats include chaparral canyons near rivers in arid areas, roads, and washes.

The wingspan is 20–25 mm.

The larvae feed on Encelia californica, Baccharis glutinosa, Clematis drummondii and Clematis henryi.

== Subspecies ==
- Calephelis nemesis nemesis (northern Mexico, Arizona)
- Calephelis nemesis australis (W.H. Edwards, 1877) (Texas)
- Calephelis nemesis californica McAlpine, 1971 (California)
- Calephelis nemesis dammersi McAlpine, 1971 (California)
