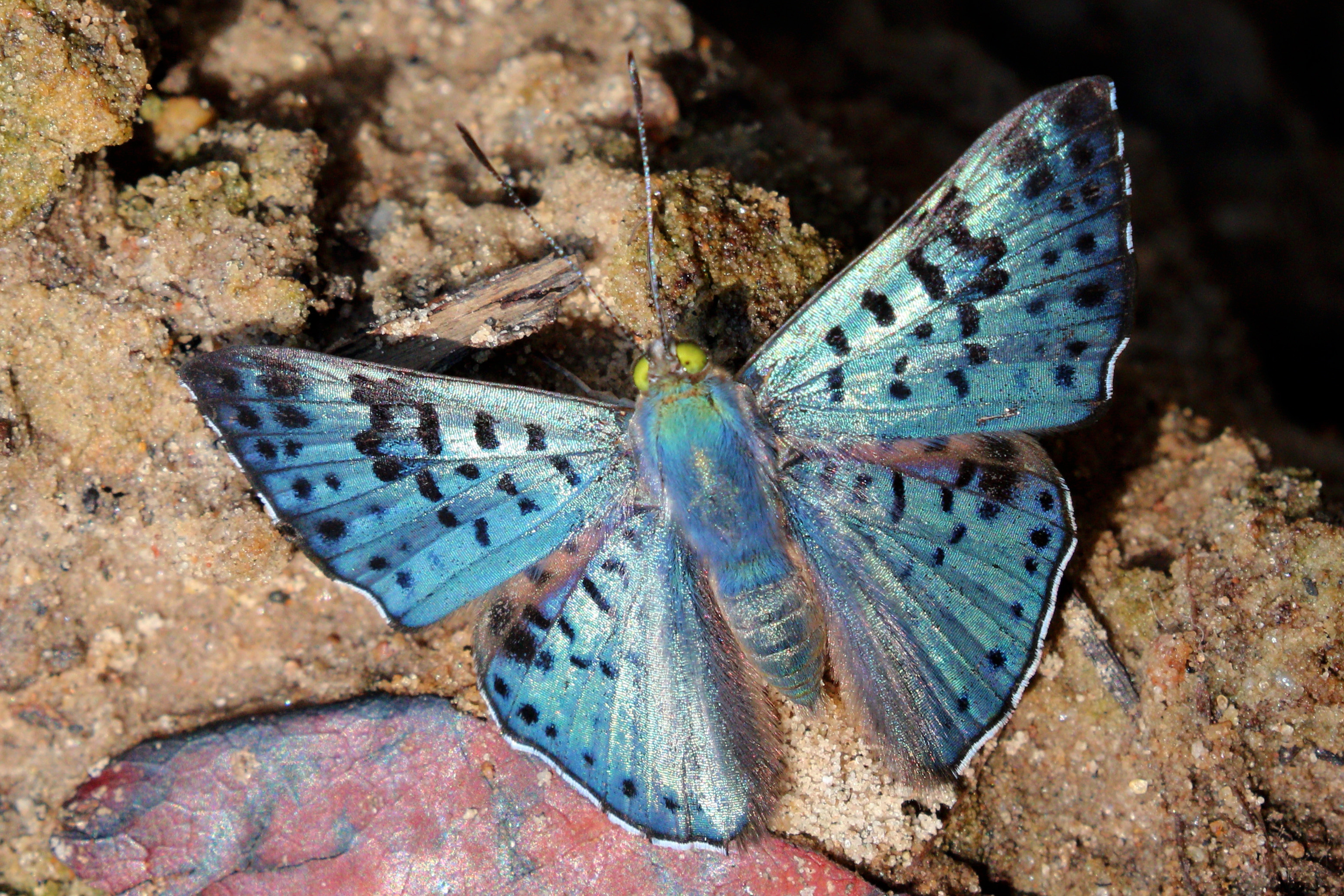
- L. a. agesilas, Cristalino River; Southern Amazon, Brazil

Scientific classification
- Domain: Eukaryota
- Kingdom: Animalia
- Phylum: Arthropoda
- Class: Insecta
- Order: Lepidoptera
- Family: Riodinidae
- Genus: Lasaia
- Species: L. agesilas

Binomial name
- Lasaia agesilas (Latreille, [1809])

Synonyms
- Erycina agesilas Latreille, [1809]; Lasaia narses Staudinger, 1888

= Lasaia agesilas =

Glittering sapphire

Species of butterfly

Lasaia agesilas, the glittering sapphire, black-patch bluemark or Narses metalmark is a metalmark butterfly (family Riodinidae). The species was first described by Pierre André Latreille in 1809. It is native to Central America and the north of South America. It ranges from Costa Rica, Panama, Venezuela, Trinidad, Colombia, Ecuador, Peru, Bolivia, Guyana, Argentina, to the Brazilian Amazon.

The top of the wings is metallic blue with black markings.

== Subspecies ==
- L. a. agesilas (Costa Rica, Panama, Venezuela, Trinidad, Colombia, Ecuador, Peru, Bolivia, British Guiana, Brazil: Amazonas)
- L. a. esmeralda Clench, 1972 (Paraguay, Brazil: Santa Catarina, São Paulo, Parana)
- L. a. callaina Clench, 1972 (Mexico, Guatemala, El Salvador, Honduras, Costa Rica)
