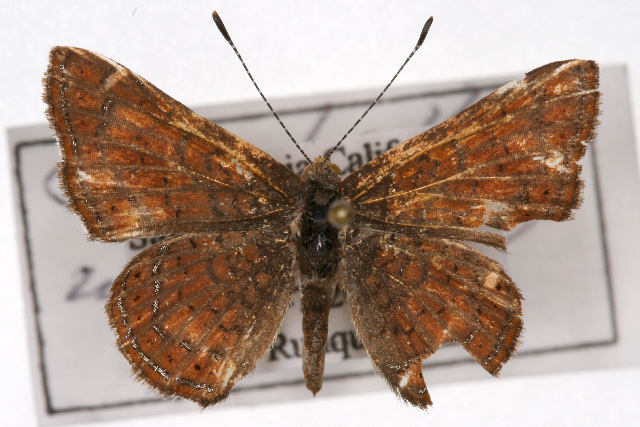

Scientific classification
- Domain: Eukaryota
- Kingdom: Animalia
- Phylum: Arthropoda
- Class: Insecta
- Order: Lepidoptera
- Family: Riodinidae
- Tribe: Riodinini
- Genus: Calephelis
- Species: C. wrighti

Binomial name
- Calephelis wrighti W. Holland, 1930

= Calephelis wrighti =

Species of butterfly

Calephelis wrighti, or Wright's metalmark, is a species of metalmark in the butterfly family Riodinidae. It is found in North America.

The MONA or Hodges number for Calephelis wrighti is 4390.
