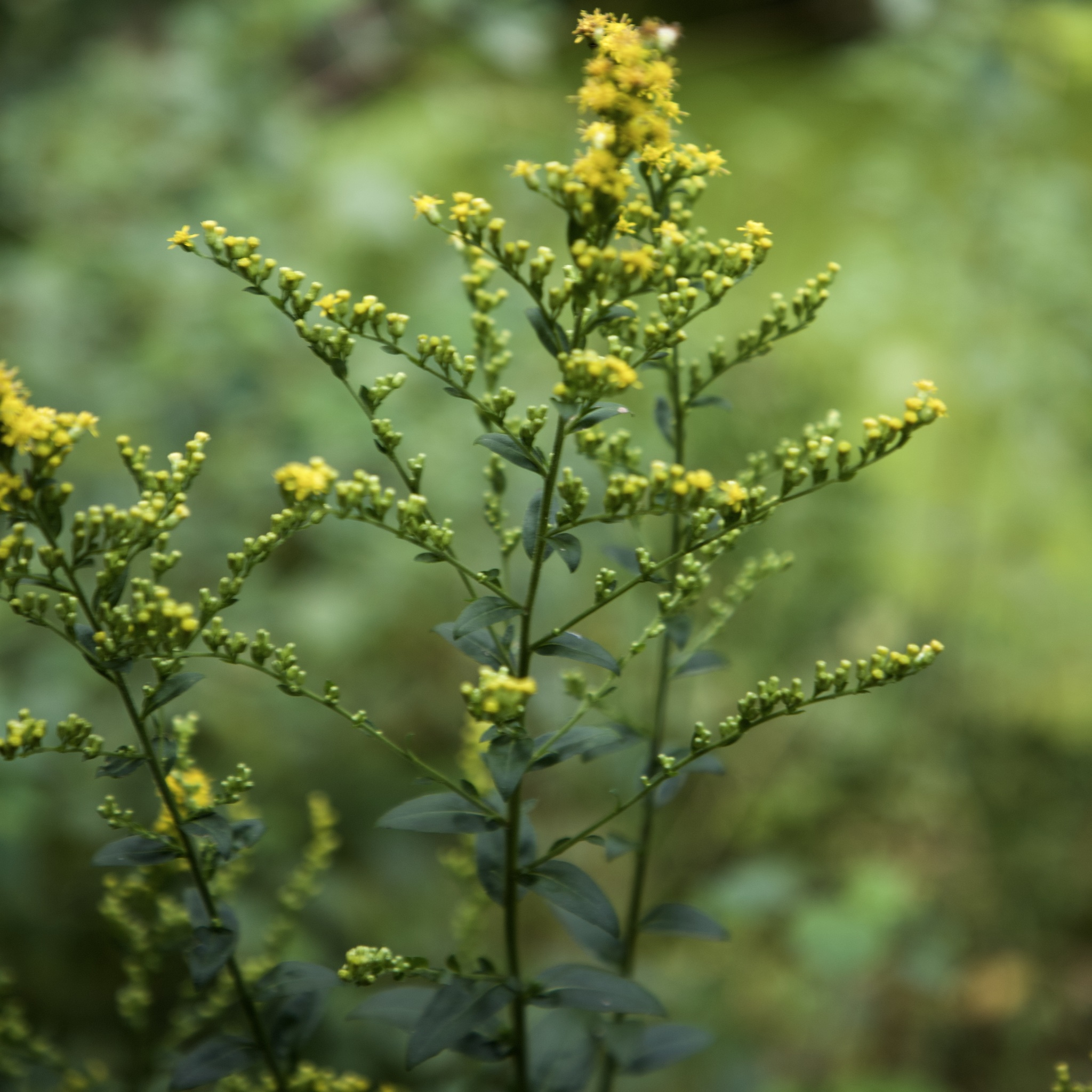

Scientific classification
- Kingdom: Plantae
- Clade: Tracheophytes
- Clade: Angiosperms
- Clade: Eudicots
- Clade: Asterids
- Order: Asterales
- Family: Asteraceae
- Genus: Solidago
- Species: S. patula

Binomial name
- Solidago patula Muhl. ex Willd

= Solidago patula =

Species of flowering plant

Solidago patula, the roundleaf goldenrod or rough-leaved goldenrod, is a species of goldenrod found in wetlands, especially swamps, fens, and sedge meadows. It is native to most of the eastern United States, as far west as Wisconsin and Texas. It is a perennial herb. There are two subspecies. It can grow up to 5 feet tall.

== Galls ==
This species is host to the following insect induced gall:

- Asphondylia pumila Plakidas, 2016 (spring and summer generation)

external link to gallformers
