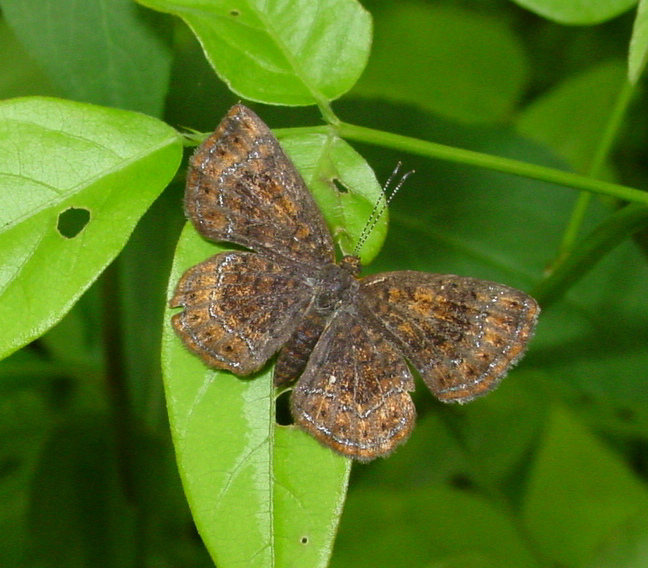

Conservation status
- Vulnerable (NatureServe)

Scientific classification
- Kingdom: Animalia
- Phylum: Arthropoda
- Clade: Pancrustacea
- Class: Insecta
- Order: Lepidoptera
- Family: Riodinidae
- Genus: Calephelis
- Species: C. borealis

Binomial name
- Calephelis borealis (Grote & Robinson, 1866)

Synonyms
- Nymphidia borealis Grote & Robinson, 1866; Calephelis geda Scudder, 1876

= Calephelis borealis =

Northern metalmark

Species of butterfly

Calephelis borealis, commonly known as the northern metalmark, is a butterfly of the family Riodinidae endemic to the United States.

== Distribution and habitat ==
One of the few representatives of the usually-tropical Riodinidae in eastern North America, it ranges through western Connecticut south through west-central Pennsylvania, as well as the central Appalachians and Ohio River Valley. Isolated populations are also found in southwest Missouri, Arkansas and eastern Oklahoma. The habitat consists of open woodland streams near serpentine, shale or limestone barrens.

== Description ==
The wingspan is 29–32 mm. Adults are on wing from mid-June to late July in one generation per year.

== Diet ==
The larvae feed on the leaves of Senecio obovatus and possibly Senecio aureus and Erigeron philadelphicus. Adults feed on nectar from flowers including butterflyweed, white sweet clover, goldenrod, ox-eye daisy, sneezeweed, and yarrow.

The species overwinters in the larval stage in leaf litter.

== Conservation ==
The species is listed as endangered in the Connecticut by state authorities, and vulnerable globally by The Nature Conservancy.
