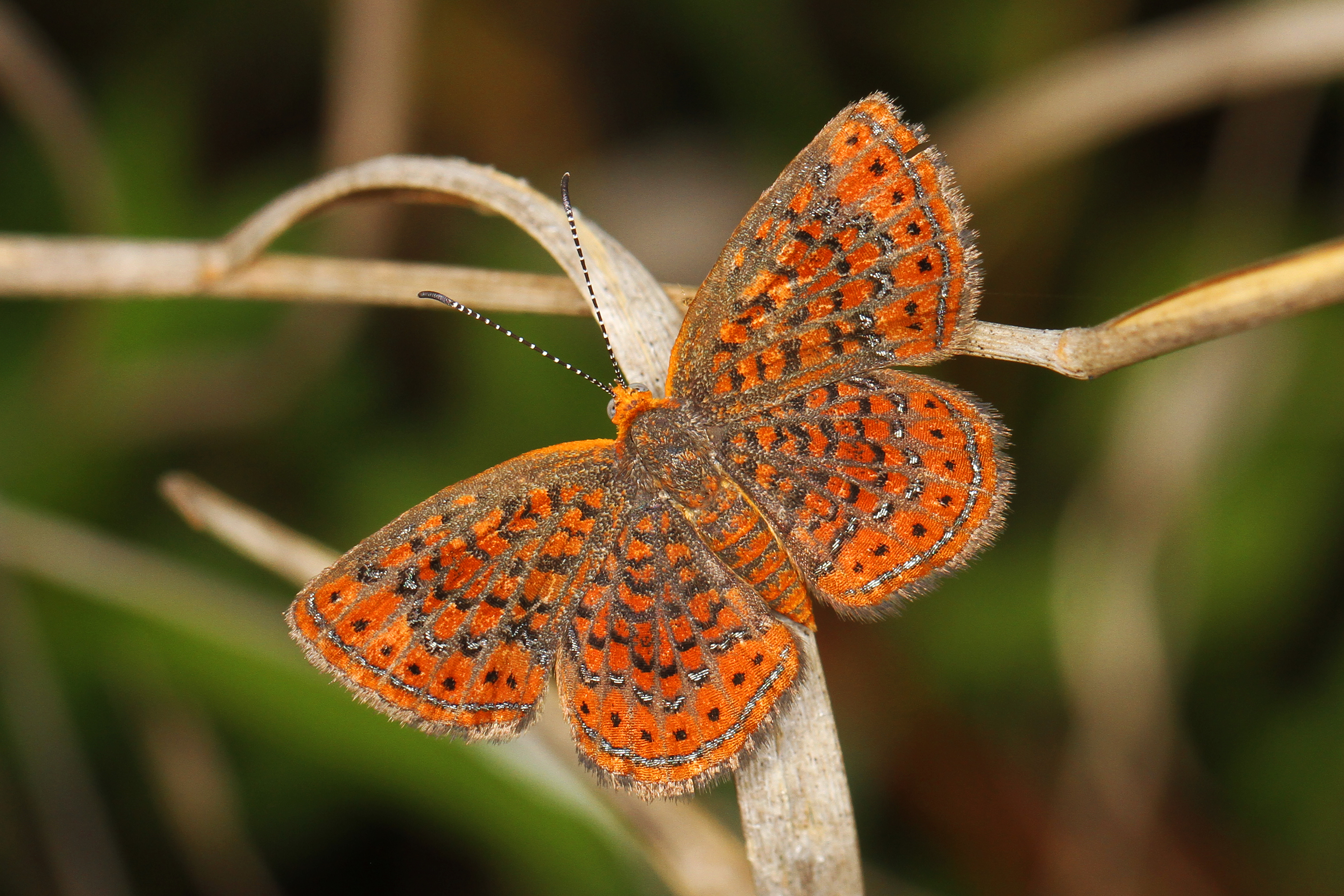

Conservation status
- Apparently Secure (NatureServe)

Scientific classification
- Kingdom: Animalia
- Phylum: Arthropoda
- Clade: Pancrustacea
- Class: Insecta
- Order: Lepidoptera
- Family: Riodinidae
- Tribe: Riodinini
- Genus: Calephelis
- Species: C. virginiensis

Binomial name
- Calephelis virginiensis (Guérin-Méneville, 1832)

= Calephelis virginiensis =

Species of butterfly

Calephelis virginiensis, the little metalmark, is a species of metalmark in the butterfly family Riodinidae. It is found in North America.
