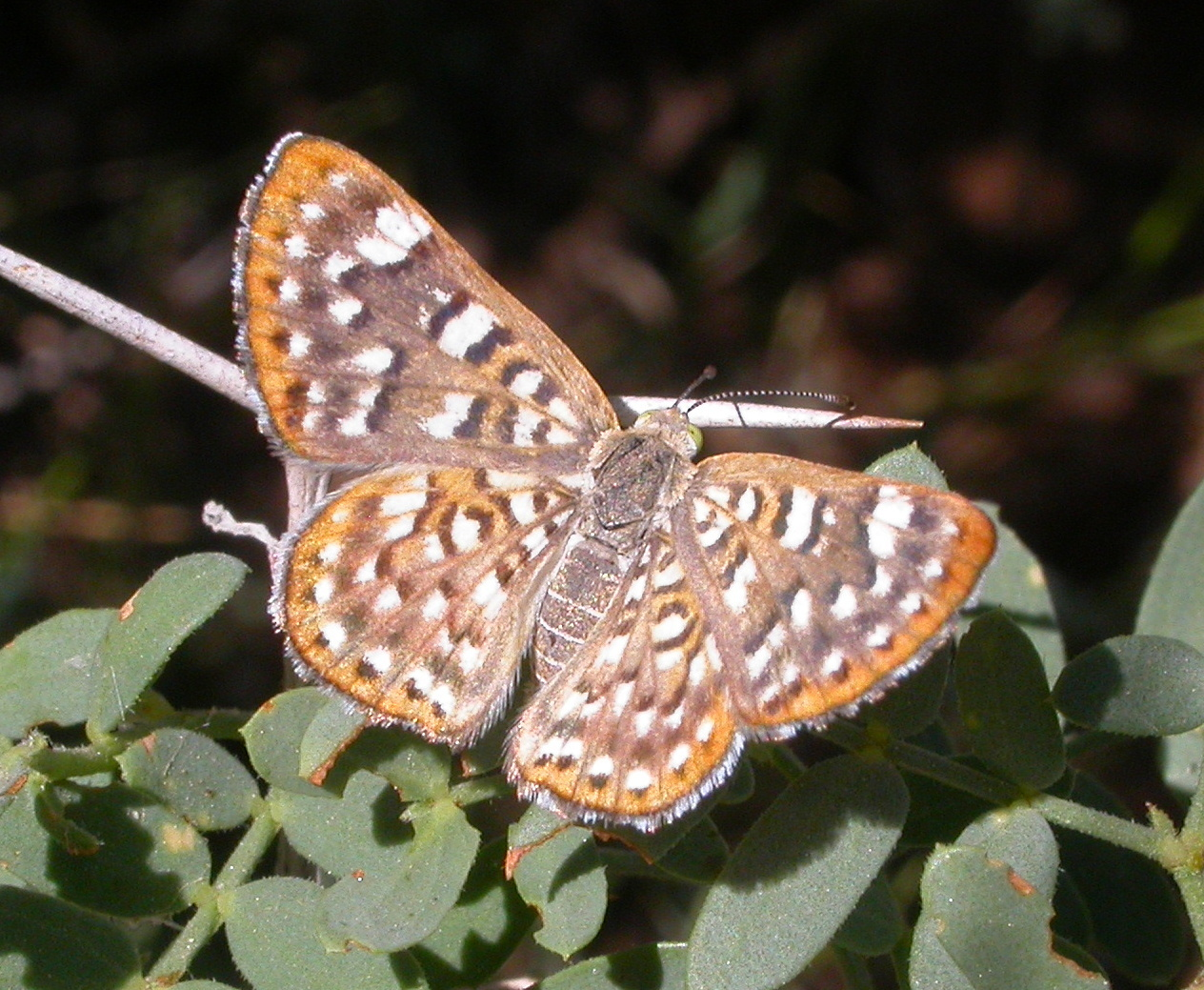

Scientific classification
- Domain: Eukaryota
- Kingdom: Animalia
- Phylum: Arthropoda
- Class: Insecta
- Order: Lepidoptera
- Family: Riodinidae
- Genus: Apodemia
- Species: A. palmeri

Binomial name
- Apodemia palmeri (W.H. Edwards, 1870)

Synonyms
- Lemonias palmerii W.H. Edwards, 1870; Apodemia palmerii (W.H. Edwards, 1870); Polystigma palmerii (W.H. Edwards, 1870)

= Apodemia palmeri =

Species of butterfly

Apodemia palmeri, the Palmer's metalmark or gray metalmark, is a species of metalmark butterfly, Riodinidae. It is found in North America from western Texas, New Mexico, Arizona, southern Utah, southern Nevada and southern California south to central Mexico and Baja California.

The wingspan is 20–30 mm. There are two generations per year from May to September in Nevada and Utah and multiple generations from April to November in the south.

The larvae feed on Prosopis pubescens and Prosopis glandulosa var. torreyana. Adults feed on flower nectar.
