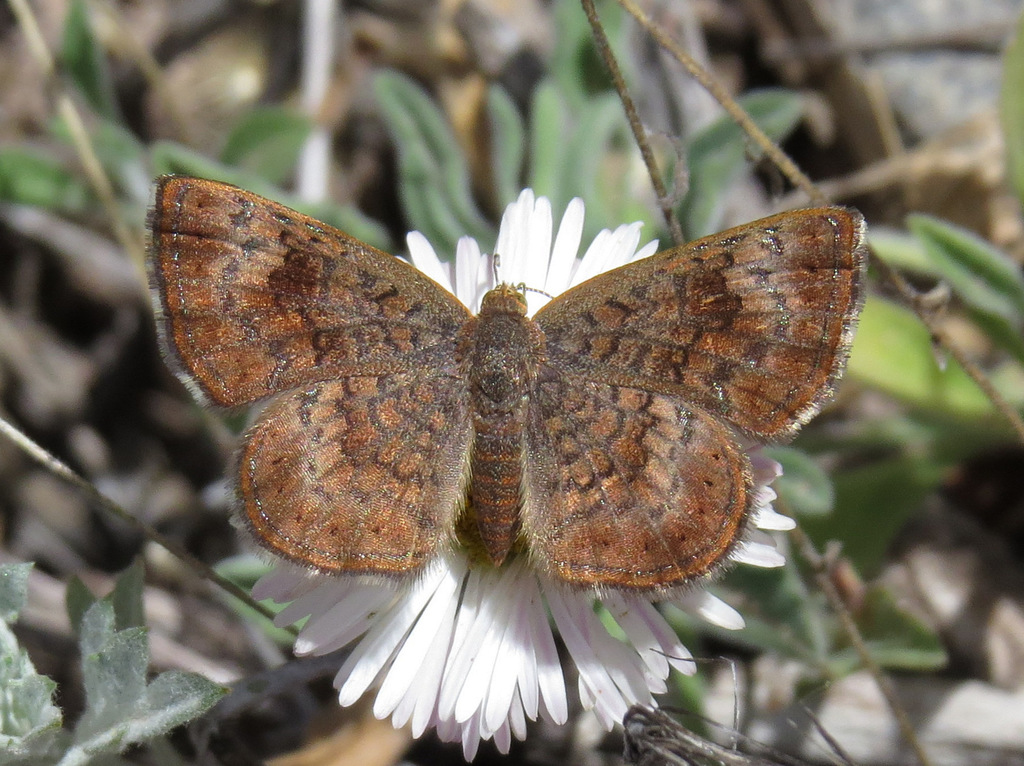

Scientific classification
- Kingdom: Animalia
- Phylum: Arthropoda
- Clade: Pancrustacea
- Class: Insecta
- Order: Lepidoptera
- Family: Riodinidae
- Genus: Calephelis
- Species: C. rawsoni

Binomial name
- Calephelis rawsoni McAlpine, 1939

= Calephelis rawsoni =

Rawson's metalmark

Species of butterfly

Calephelis rawsoni, commonly known as Rawson's metalmark, is a butterfly of the family Riodinidae. It was described by Wilbur S. McAlpine in 1939 and ranges through southern Arizona, south and west Texas and south to central Mexico. The habitat consists of moist areas including stream edges, gulches, subtropical woodland, shaded limestone outcrops.

The wingspan is 3/4 - 1 1/8 inches (2 - 2.9 cm).

The larvae feed on Eupatorium havanense and Eupatorium greggii.
