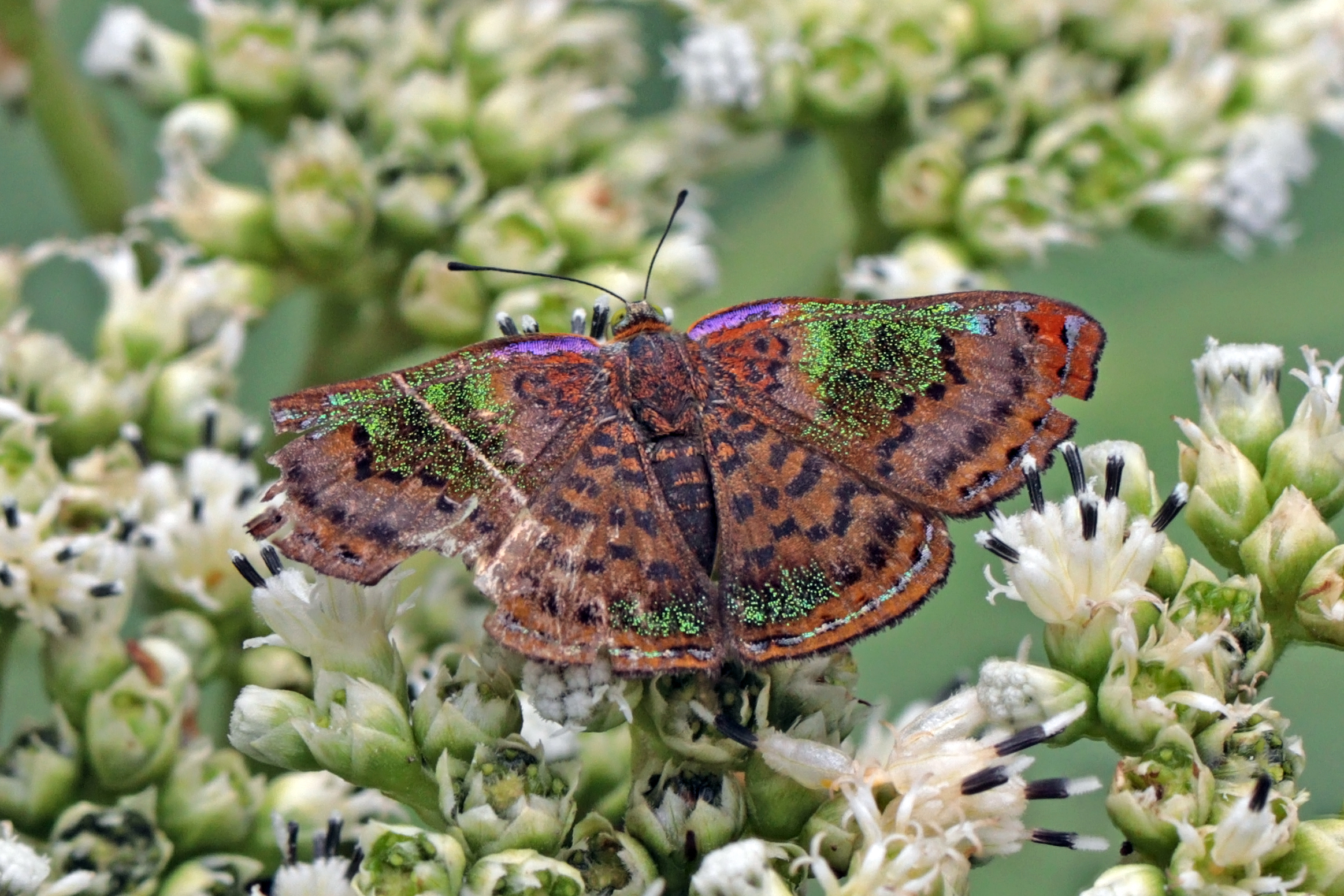
- C. rhacotis male Honduran metalmark
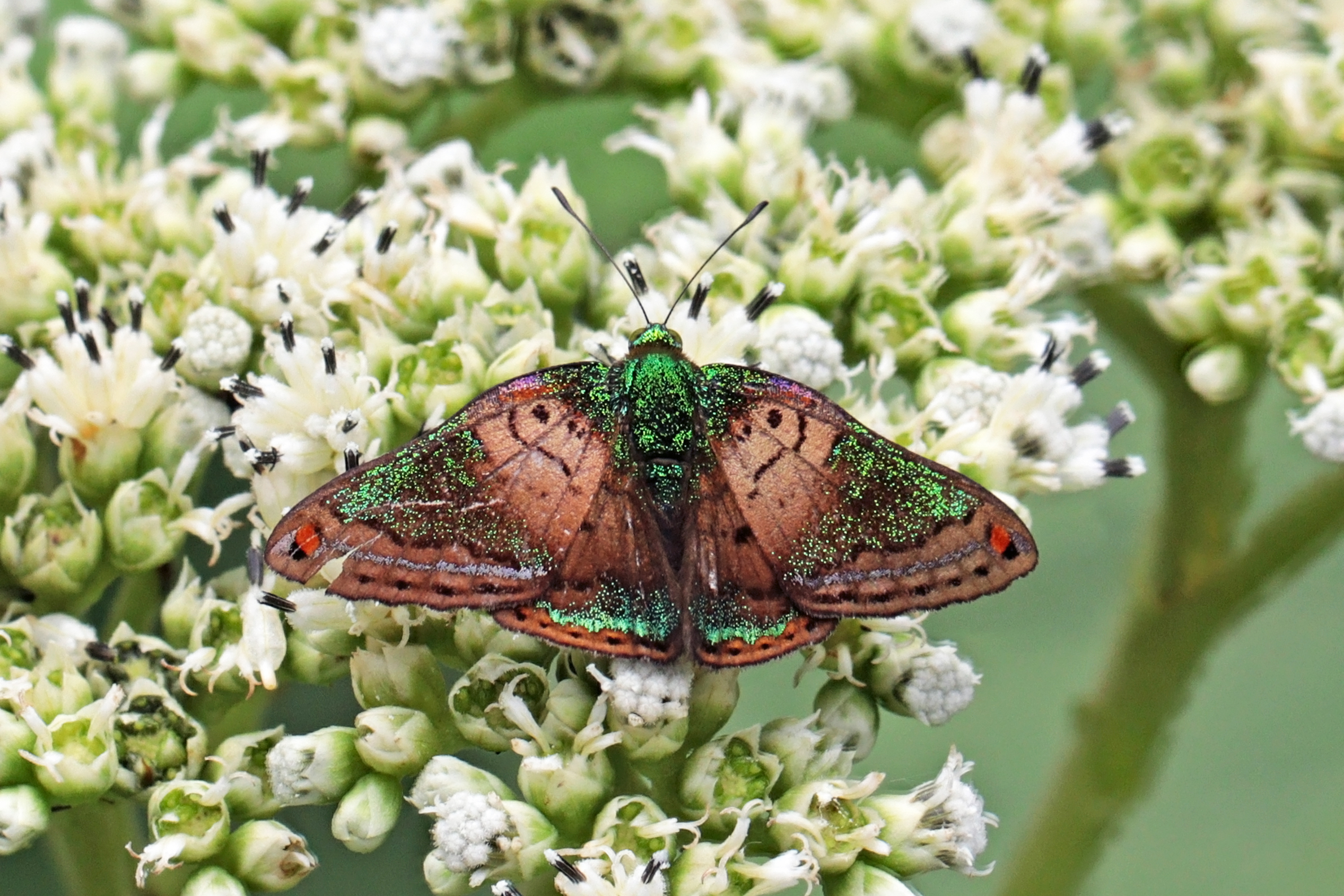
- C. mantinea lampeto Lampeto metalmark both Anton Valley, Panama

Scientific classification
- Domain: Eukaryota
- Kingdom: Animalia
- Phylum: Arthropoda
- Class: Insecta
- Order: Lepidoptera
- Family: Riodinidae
- Tribe: Riodinini
- Genus: Caria; Hübner, 1823

Species
- See text

= Caria (butterfly) =

Genus of butterflies

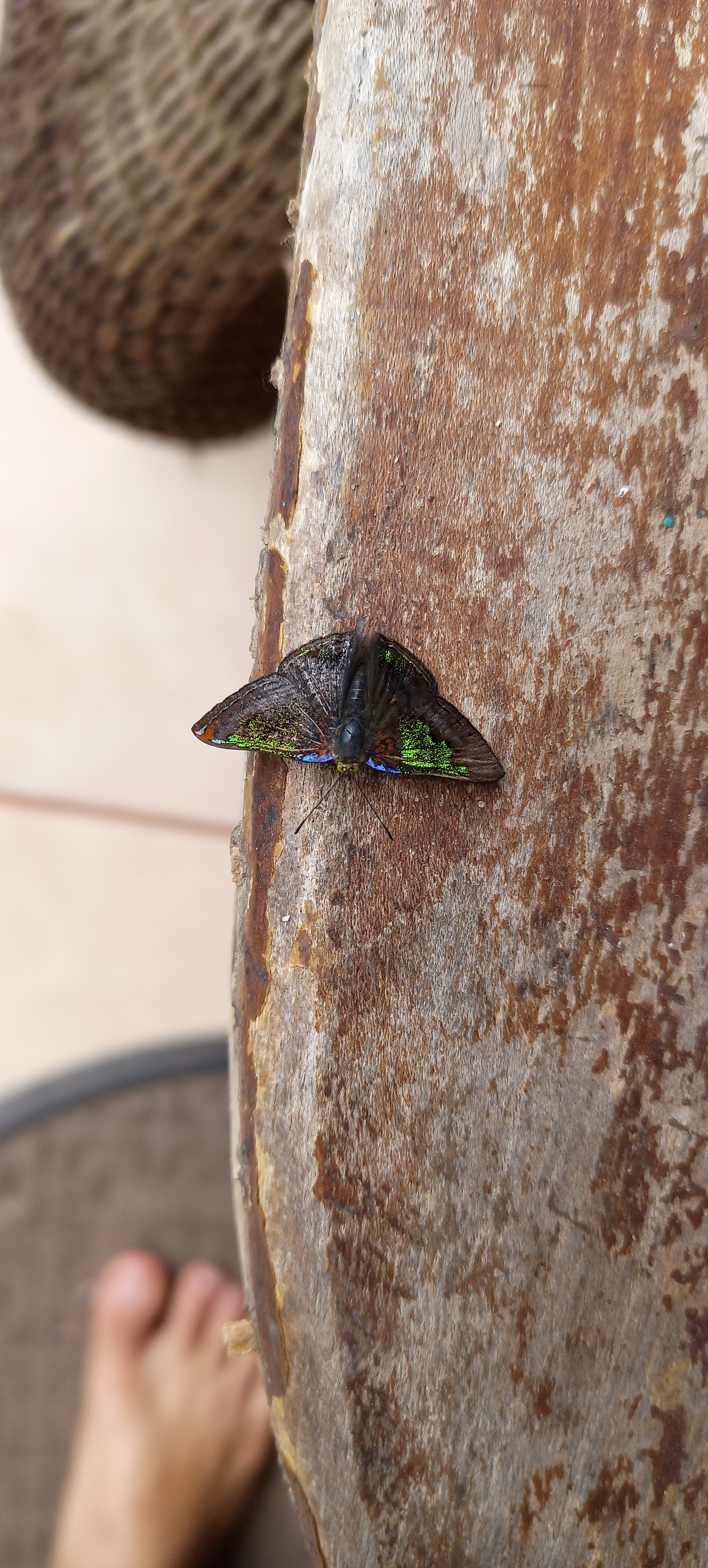

Caria is a genus in the family Riodinidae. They are resident in the Americas.

== Species list ==
- Caria castalia (Ménétriés, 1855) Brazil et au Peru.
- Caria chrysame (Hewitson, 1874) Bolivia, Peru.
- Caria domitianus (Fabricius, 1793) Mexico, Guatemala, Venezuela, Colombia, Trinidad and Tobago.
- Caria ino Godman & Salvin, [1886] Mexico
- Caria mantinea (C. & R. Felder, 1861) Mexico, Panama, Bolivia, Ecuador, Peru.
- Caria marsyas Godman, 1903 Paraguay, Brazil.
- Caria melino Dyar, 1912 Mexico
- Caria plutargus (Fabricius, 1793) Brazil.
- Caria rhacotis (Godman & Salvin, 1878) Honduras, Guatemala, Panama, Colombia, Peru.
- Caria sponsa (Staudinger, [1887]) Peru.
- Caria stillaticia Dyar, 1912 Mexico
- Caria tabrenthia Schaus, 1902 Bolivia, Peru.
- Caria trochilus Erichson, [1849] Guyane, Guyana, Brazil, Peru.

== Sources ==
- Caria
