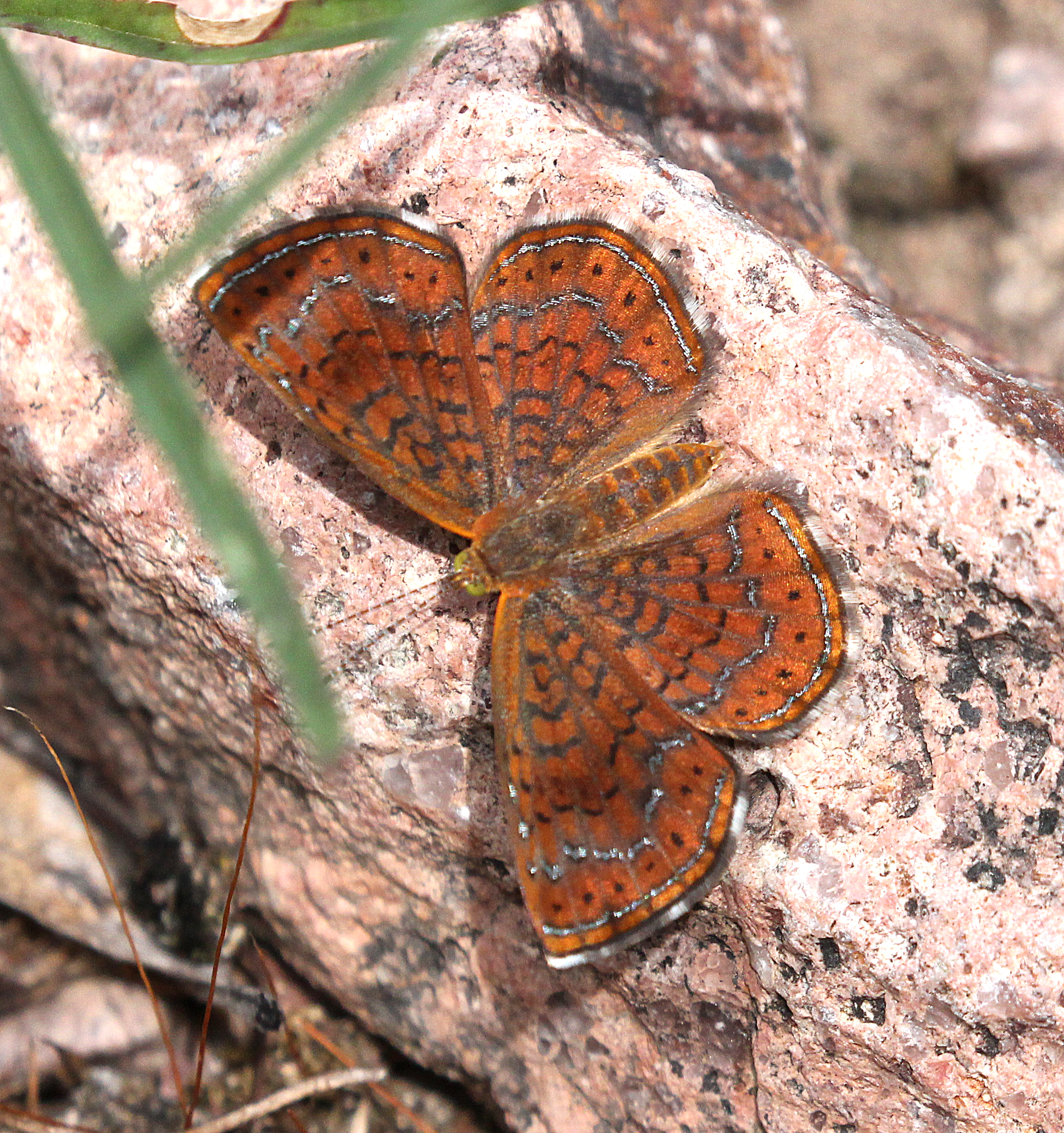

Scientific classification
- Kingdom: Animalia
- Phylum: Arthropoda
- Clade: Pancrustacea
- Class: Insecta
- Order: Lepidoptera
- Family: Riodinidae
- Tribe: Riodinini
- Genus: Calephelis
- Species: C. arizonensis

Binomial name
- Calephelis arizonensis McAlpine, 1971

= Calephelis arizonensis =

Species of butterfly

Calephelis arizonensis, the Arizona metalmark, is a species of metalmark in the butterfly family Riodinidae. It is found in North America.
