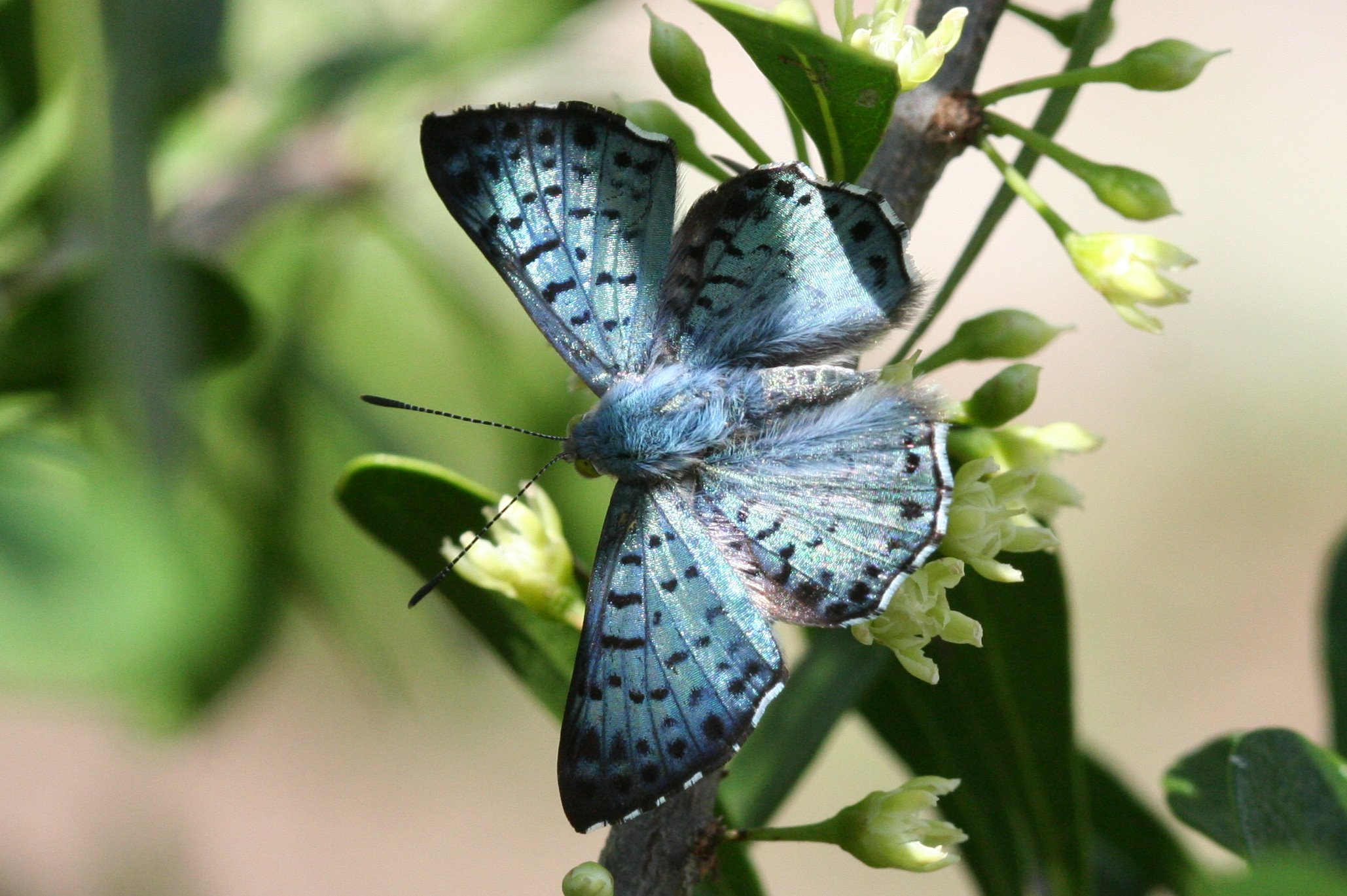
- Male

Scientific classification
- Kingdom: Animalia
- Phylum: Arthropoda
- Clade: Pancrustacea
- Class: Insecta
- Order: Lepidoptera
- Family: Riodinidae
- Genus: Lasaia
- Species: L. sula

Binomial name
- Lasaia sula Staudinger, 1888

= Lasaia sula =

Species of butterfly

Lasaia sula, the blue metalmark, is a species of butterfly in the family Riodinidae that is native to North America. It ranges from the Lower Rio Grande Valley of Texas in the United States south to Honduras and inhabits subtropical forests, forest edges, and agricultural areas.

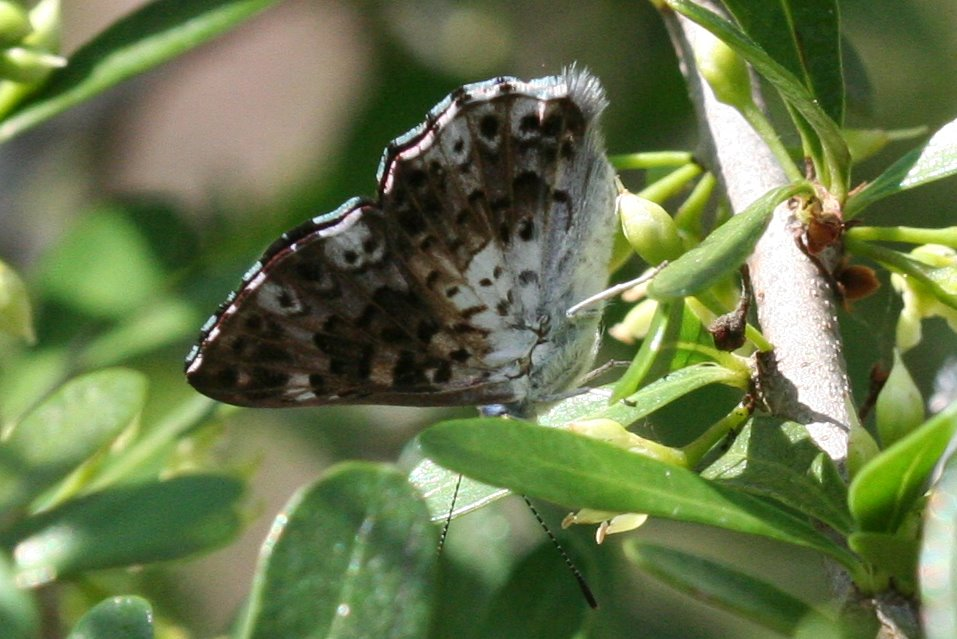
Ventral view

The top of the wings is metallic blue while the undersides are checker spotted and grayish brown. The wingspan is 2.2 to 3.2 cm (0.87 to 1.26 in). Caterpillars feed on Albizia species.
