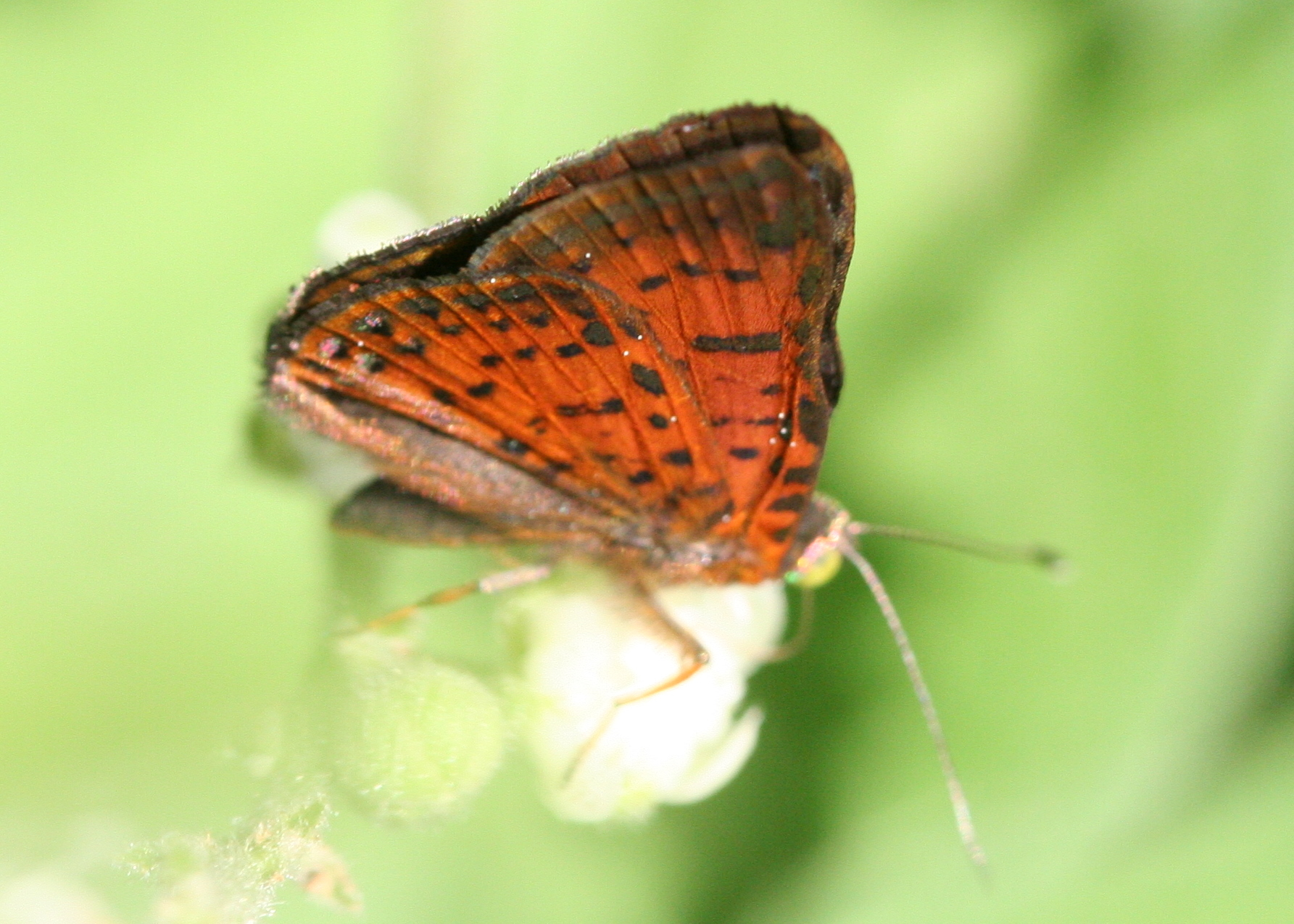

Scientific classification
- Domain: Eukaryota
- Kingdom: Animalia
- Phylum: Arthropoda
- Class: Insecta
- Order: Lepidoptera
- Family: Riodinidae
- Tribe: Riodinini
- Genus: Caria
- Species: C. ino

Binomial name
- Caria ino (Godman & Salvin, 1886)

= Caria ino =

Species of butterfly

Caria ino, the red-bordered metalmark, is a species of metalmark in the butterfly family Riodinidae. It is found in North America.

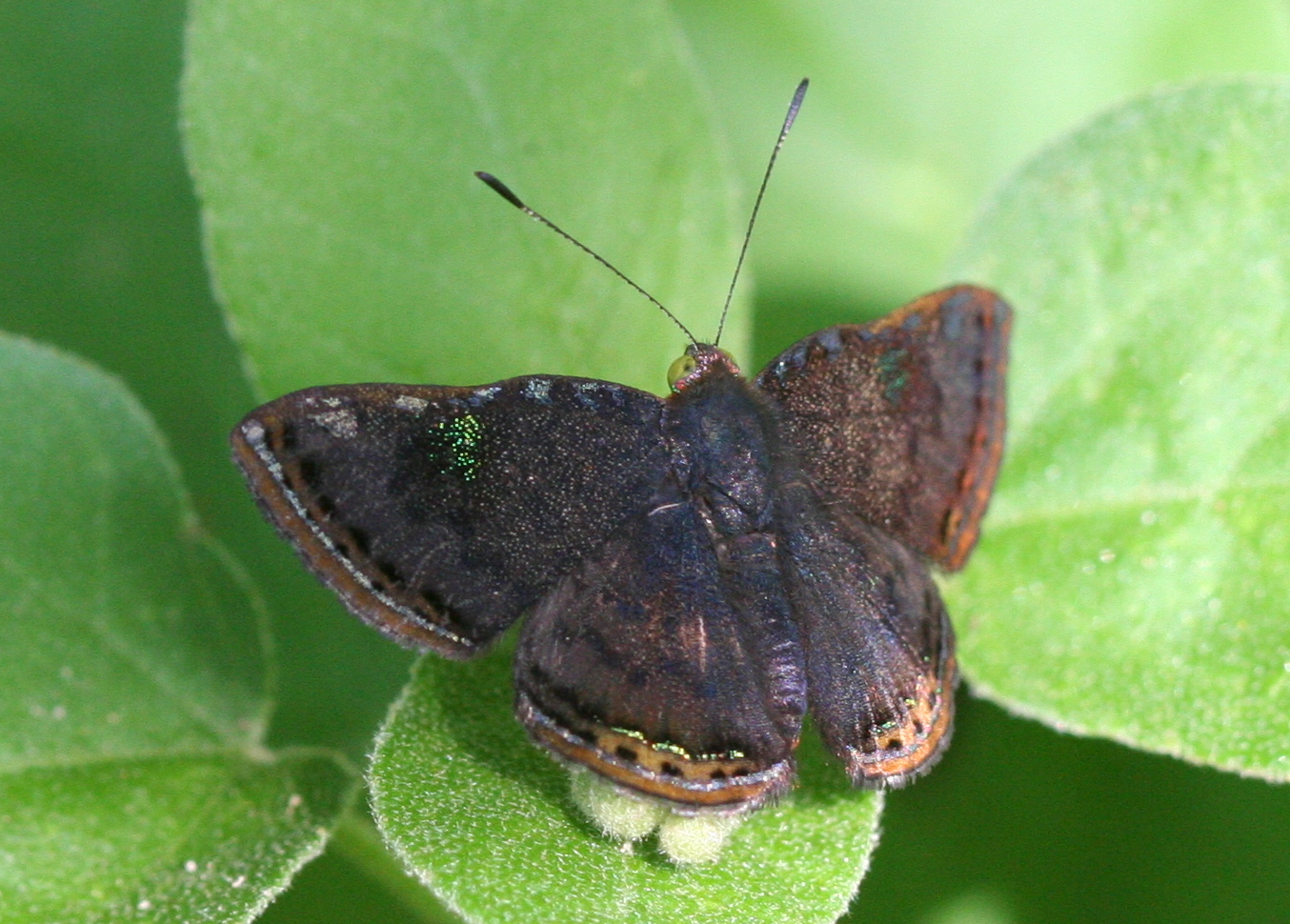
Red-bordered metalmark, Caria ino

== Subspecies ==
These two subspecies belong to the species Caria ino:

- Caria ino ino
- Caria ino melicerta Schaus, 1890
