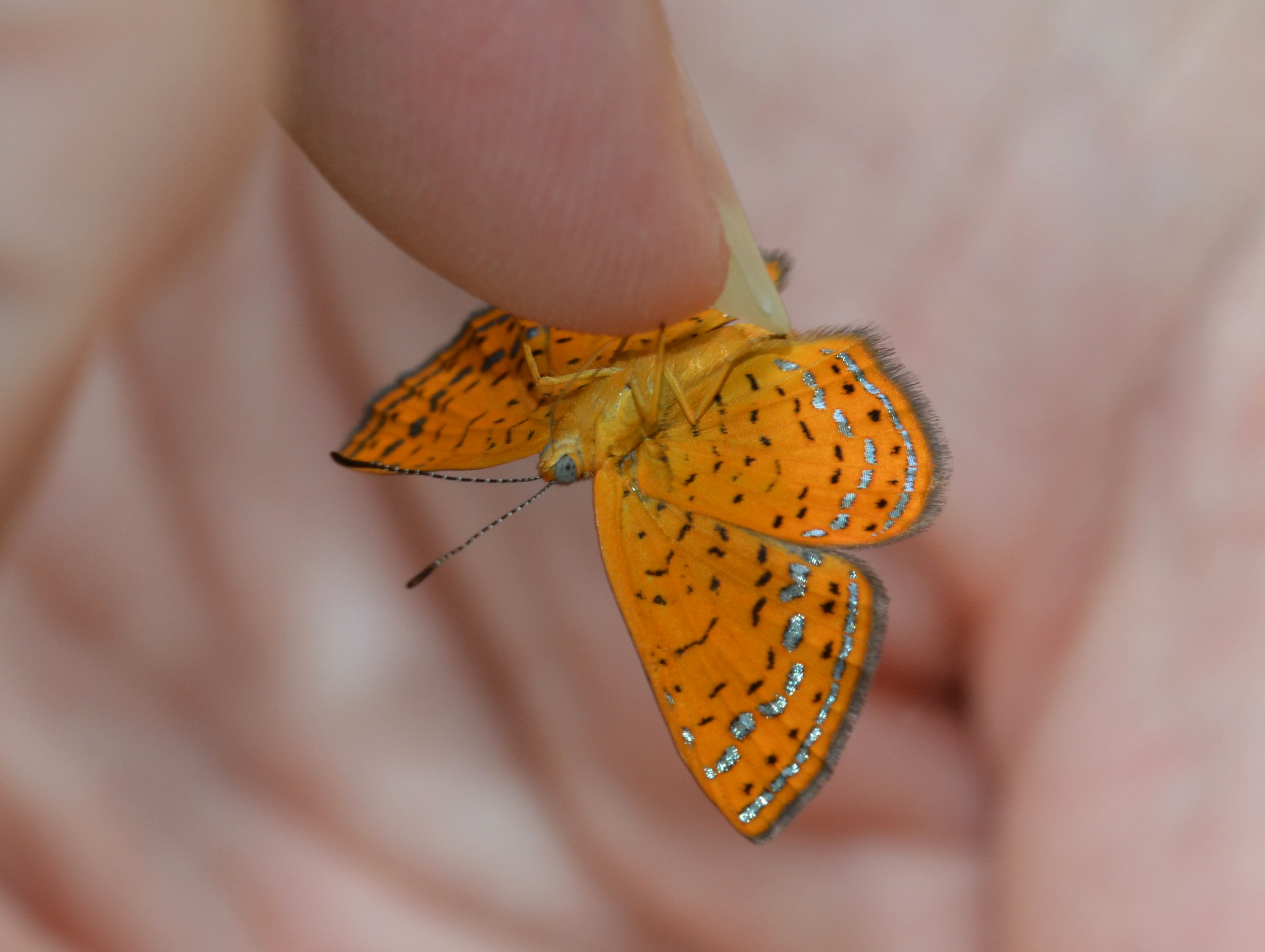

Scientific classification
- Kingdom: Animalia
- Phylum: Arthropoda
- Clade: Pancrustacea
- Class: Insecta
- Order: Lepidoptera
- Family: Riodinidae
- Genus: Calephelis
- Species: C. muticum

Binomial name
- Calephelis muticum McAlpine (1937)
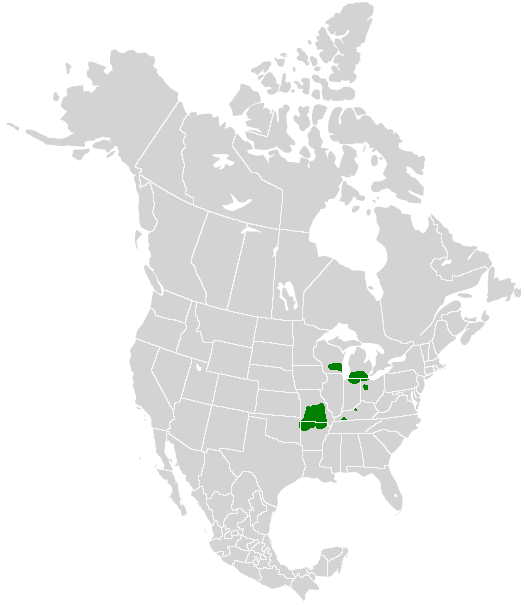

Synonyms
- Emesis muticum; Calephelis mutica

= Calephelis muticum =

Swamp metalmark

Species of butterfly

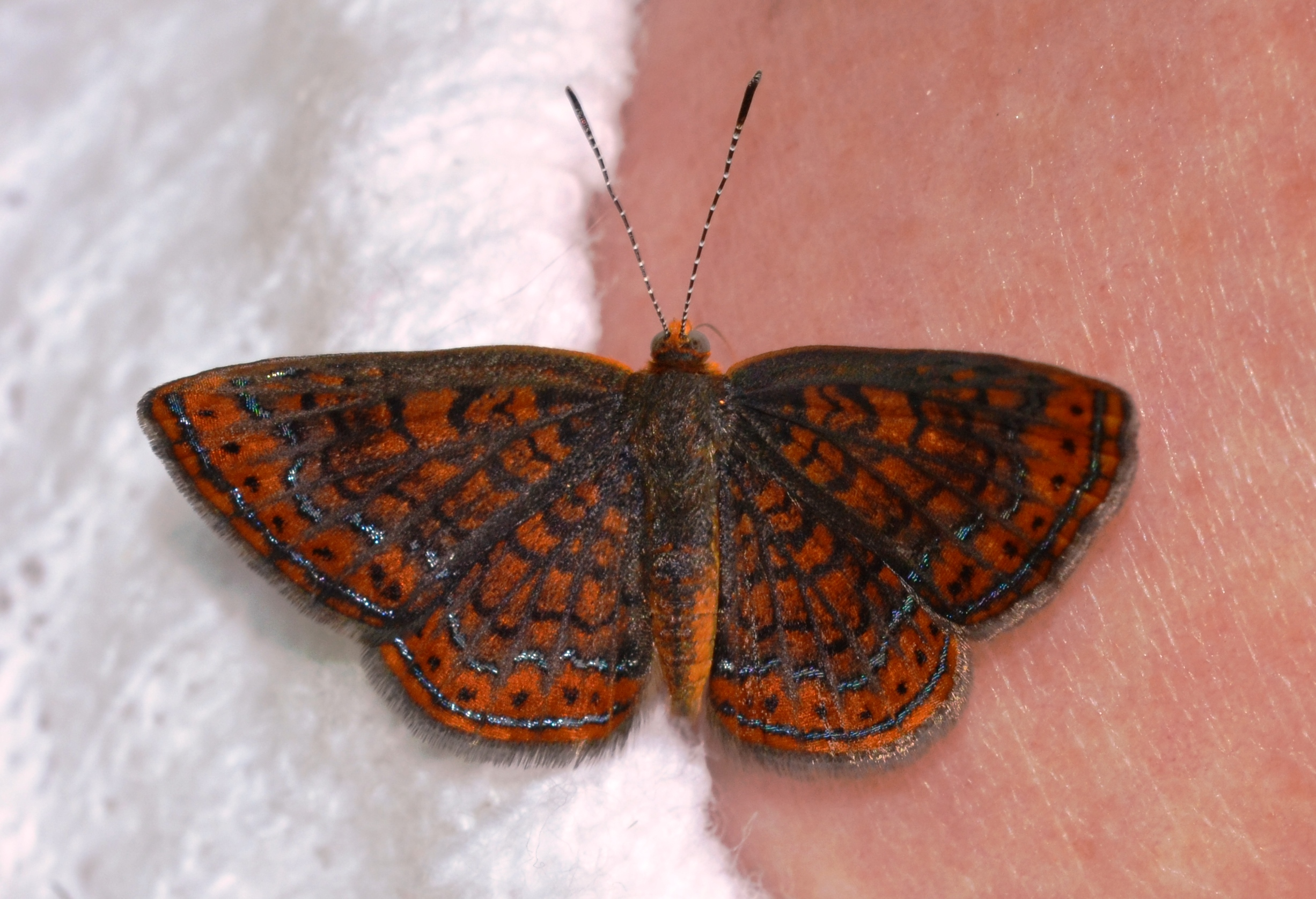
Close-up of the swamp metalmark showing markings on the dorsal side of its wings Host plant: swamp thistle (Cirsium muticum) Host plant: Carolina thistle (Cirsium carolinianum) Host plant: tall thistle (Cirsium altissimum)

Calephelis muticum, the swamp metalmark, is a butterfly species in the family Riodinidae. It has small wings that are red-brown and orange colored with silver and black markings.

Small colonies of the swamp metalmark can be found scattered across ten states, and the butterfly's conservation status ranges from vulnerable to possibly extinct in these areas. The swamp metalmark's habitat has decreased in size due to invasive species and human interference, such as the use of pesticides and the conversion of wetlands for commercial use. Conservationists hope that a greater abundance of swamp thistles—one of the butterfly's most important host plants—may lead to an increase in the swamp metalmark population.

== Taxonomy ==
The swamp metalmark was formerly considered the same species as the northern metalmark until Wilbur S. McAlpine determined that the swamp metalmark is a distinct species. Some major differences between the two include their habitat, their wings, and their diet. The swamp metalmark prefers low, grassy, and moist habitations, while the northern metalmark prefers open and dry spaces. Swamp thistle hosts the swamp metalmark, while roundleaf ragwort primarily hosts the northern metalmark. Both populations, however, are small and isolated.

== Description ==
Characterized by an appearance similar to that of the tiger moth caterpillar, the swamp metalmark caterpillar has a green body with black spots and wispy white hairs.

Once it matures into a butterfly, the swamp metalmark can be distinguished by its red-brown coloring and by the rows of small, metallic spots and lines on the insect's hind wings. Its abdomen is orange and gray to enable camouflage, and the species sometimes has checkered marks on its wing fringes. Males have pointed forewings while the females' forewings tend to be slightly more rounded. The swamp metalmark's wingspan ranges from 2.4 to 3 cm.

== Genetics and adaptations ==
Metalmarks with reddish-brown coloring on their forewings and hind wings, a yellowish ventral side, and metallic silver bands have been identified with the genus Calephelis. In 2017, a study of the metalmark family led to the first complete genome sequencing of two separate metalmark species. This comparison of sequenced genomes bridged the gap in scientists' understanding of the metalmark genome as a whole. Even though research on the genetics of the swamp metalmark is recent and developing, it was discovered that the Calephelis butterflies have a distinctive expansion of specific genes that help caterpillars leave behind their old exoskeletons as they mature.

== Habitat and distribution ==
Swamp metalmarks tend to reside in wetlands that contain lots of vegetation. The distribution of the swamp metalmark includes wetlands from the upper Midwest, including the Ohio Valley, through the Ozark Mountain range and into parts of Arizona. Additionally, the distribution of these butterflies can be linked to certain vegetation such as the Cirsium muticum, Cirsium carolinianum, and Cirsium altissimum, also known as the swamp thistle, Carolina thistle, and tall thistle, respectively.

== Life cycle ==
Swamp metalmark eggs are found on the bottom side of host leaves. During the later stages of their development as caterpillars, they overwinter. Adult swamp metalmarks in the North reproduce once between June and August. In the South, two broods are produced between late spring and early fall.

== Conservation status and threats ==
Calephelis muticum is threatened by ongoing loss and degradation of habitat, pesticides, and invasive species.

The swamp metalmark currently resides within the G3 rank of conservation status, indicating that it is a globally vulnerable population. The species is listed as endangered in Illinois.

Present and potential threats to this population and their habitat are primarily due to human interference and invasive species:

- Fire suppression: The use of fire to regulate vegetation growth can directly harm swamp metalmark larvae, but it also proves necessary for habitat maintenance.
- Grazing: Livestock trample larvae and pupae and deplete their food sources.
- Overutilization: Illegal collection of the swamp metalmark continues to deplete the population.
- Habitat degradation: The clearing of site for residential purposes results in destruction of the swamp metalmark's habitat.
- Pesticides: The use of herbicides and insecticides, as well as fertilizer and pesticide runoff, all contribute to habitat deterioration.
- Invasive species threatening the swamp metalmark's host plants: species of garlic mustard, Japanese and bush honeysuckles, Japanese stilt grass, non-native buckthorns, and native raspberries pose dangers to the swamp metalmark's host plant by robbing it of its habitat. In addition, gypsy moth populations defoliate the swamp metalmark's habitat.

Conservation efforts must emphasize habitat preservation and land management since most threats to the swamp metalmark population are due to a direct impact on its habitat.
