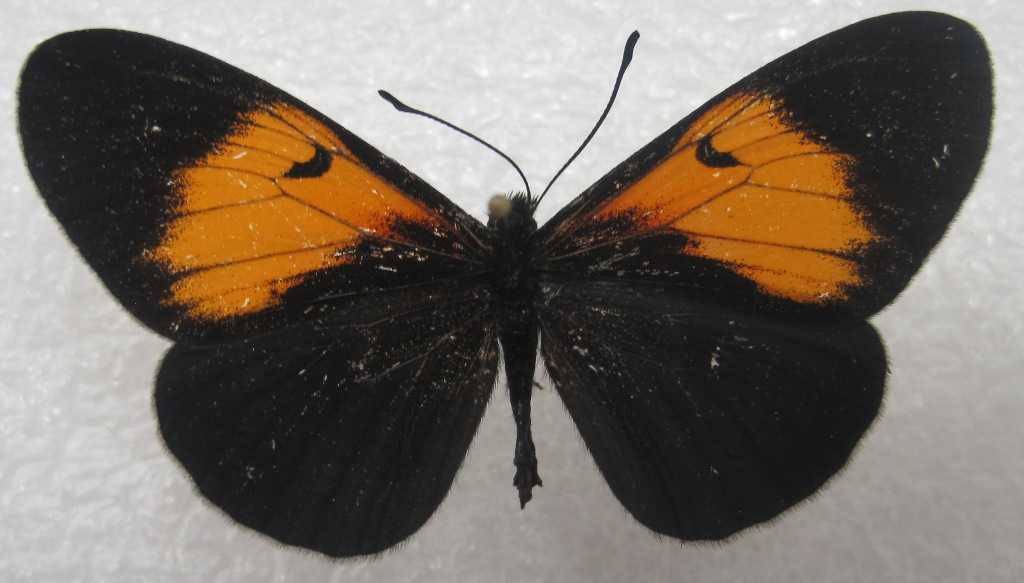

Scientific classification
- Kingdom: Animalia
- Phylum: Arthropoda
- Class: Insecta
- Order: Lepidoptera
- Family: Nymphalidae
- Genus: Altinote
- Species: A. stratonice

Binomial name
- Altinote stratonice Latreille, 1813

Subspecies
- A. s. acipha; A. s. adoxa; A. s. aereta; A. s. marthae; A. s. meridana; A. s. oaxaca; A. s. stratonice

= Altinote stratonice =

Species of butterfly

Actinote stratonice is a species of butterfly of the genus Altinote.

== Description ==
Actinote stratonice is a medium size butterfly. The wing length in males is 24.4 mm (26-31 mm) and in females from 28.2 to 38 mm. The costal margin of the forewing is slightly convex, apex round as is the external margin. The lathe is round and the anal margin is almost straight. The antennae, head, thorax and abdomen are black. The background color of the forewings is black. The area of the disc cell is orange, and from the postdiscal area, the cells (R2-R3, M1-M2, M2-M3, M3-Cu1, Cu1-Cu2, Cu2-A2, and anal cell) have orange color. orange to the postbasal region. The hind wings in dorsal view are black with the presence of slight iridescence in the Cu2-Cu1 and Cu1-M3 cells.

Ventrally the pattern of the forewing in the area of the disc cell is orange and towards the cells it goes from orange to yellow. The posterior wings, the costal margin is slightly convex, the apex is round as well as external and anal or internal. In the ventral view of the hind wings, the bottom is black, and it has yellow scales, denser in the area near the basal area and completely close to the humeral vein. The head, thorax and abdomen in ventral view are also black. The female is slightly different from the male, except that the ventral wings have mostly yellow scales.

== Distribution ==
The species is distributed across Southern Oaxaca and southern Sierra Madre, located in Mexico.
