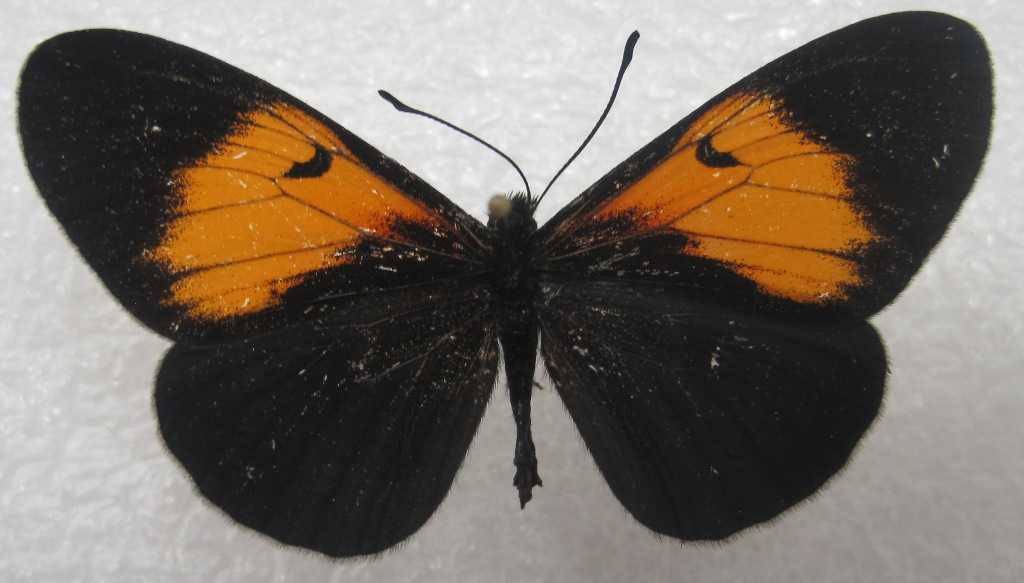
- Altinote stratonice

Scientific classification
- Domain: Eukaryota
- Kingdom: Animalia
- Phylum: Arthropoda
- Class: Insecta
- Order: Lepidoptera
- Family: Nymphalidae
- Tribe: Acraeini
- Genus: Altinote; Potts, 1943

Species groups
- See text

= Altinote =

Genus of brush-footed butterflies

Altinote is a genus of butterflies from South America of the subfamily Heliconiinae in the family Nymphalidae. For taxonomic problems regarding this group, see Acraea.

== Species ==
Listed alphabetically within groups:

- neleus species group
  - Altinote alcione (Hewitson, 1852)
  - Altinote neleus (Latreille, [1813])
  - Altinote stratonice (Latreille, [1813])
- ozomene species group:
  - Altinote anaxo (Hopffer, 1874)
  - Altinote callianthe (C. & R. Felder, 1862)
  - Altinote dicaeus (Latreille, [1817]) – red-banded altinote
  - Altinote eresia (C. & R. Felder, 1862)
  - Altinote griseata (Butler, 1873)
  - Altinote hilaris (Jordan, 1910)
  - Altinote momina (Jordan, 1910) – Jordan's altinote
  - Altinote negra (C. & R. Felder, 1862) – gaudy altinote
  - Altinote ozomene (Godart, 1819) – Godart's altinote
  - Altinote stratonice Latreille, 1813 – Latreille's altinote, orange-disked altinote
  - Altinote tenebrosa (Hewitson, 1868)
  - Altinote trinacria (C. & R. Felder, 1862)
- unknown species group:
  - Altinote rubrocellulata (Hayward, 1960)
