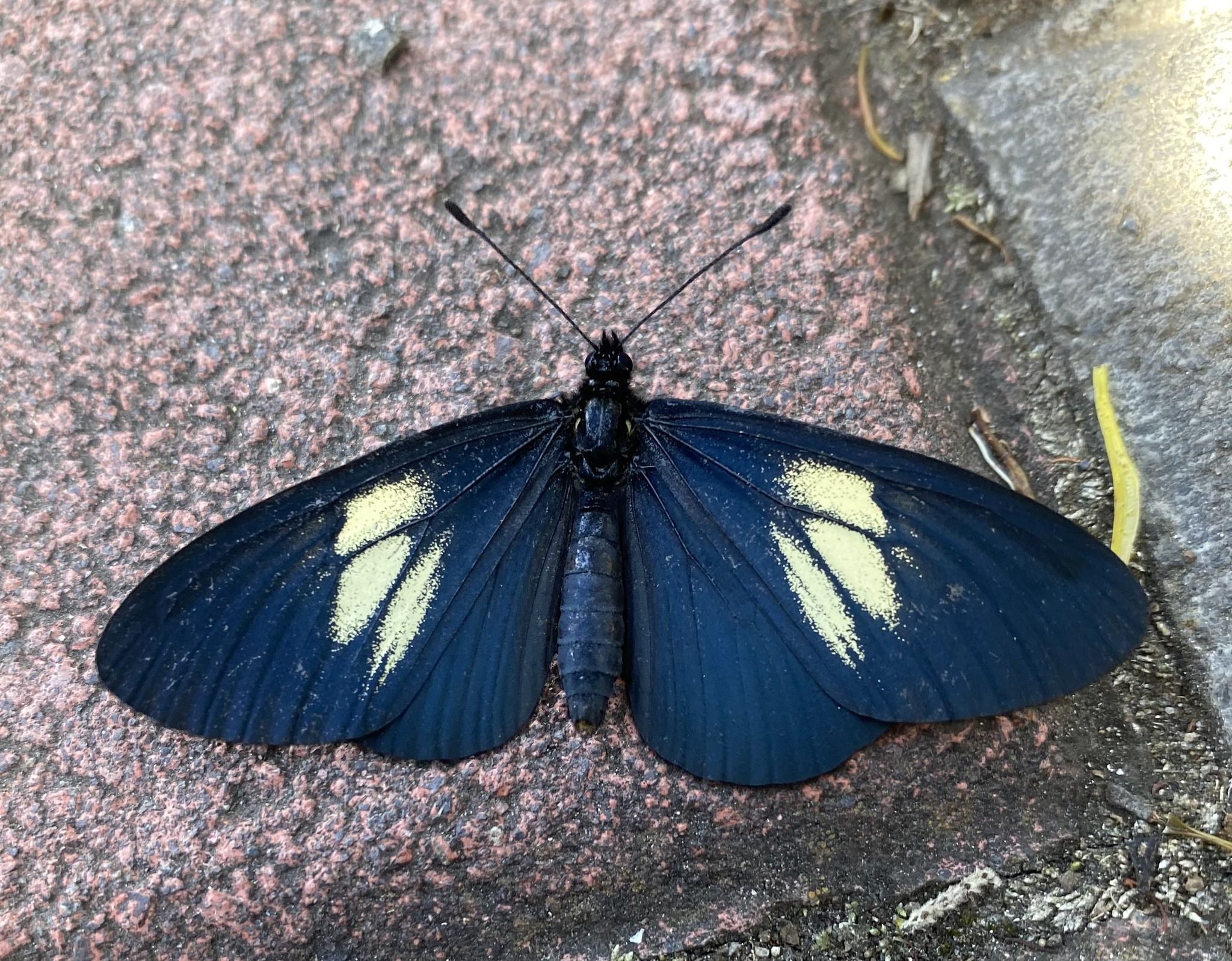

Scientific classification
- Domain: Eukaryota
- Kingdom: Animalia
- Phylum: Arthropoda
- Class: Insecta
- Order: Lepidoptera
- Family: Nymphalidae
- Genus: Altinote
- Species: A. ozomene

Binomial name
- Altinote ozomene (Godart, 1819)

Subspecies
- A. o. calimene; A. o. carbonaria; A. o. cleasa; A. o. gabrielae; A. o. nox; A. o. ozomene

Synonyms
- Acraea ozomene, Godart, 1819

= Altinote ozomene =

Species of butterfly

Actinote ozomene is a species of butterfly in the genus Altinote. The species has been documented in Honduras, Nicaragua and El Salvador.
