= List of butterflies of Dominica =

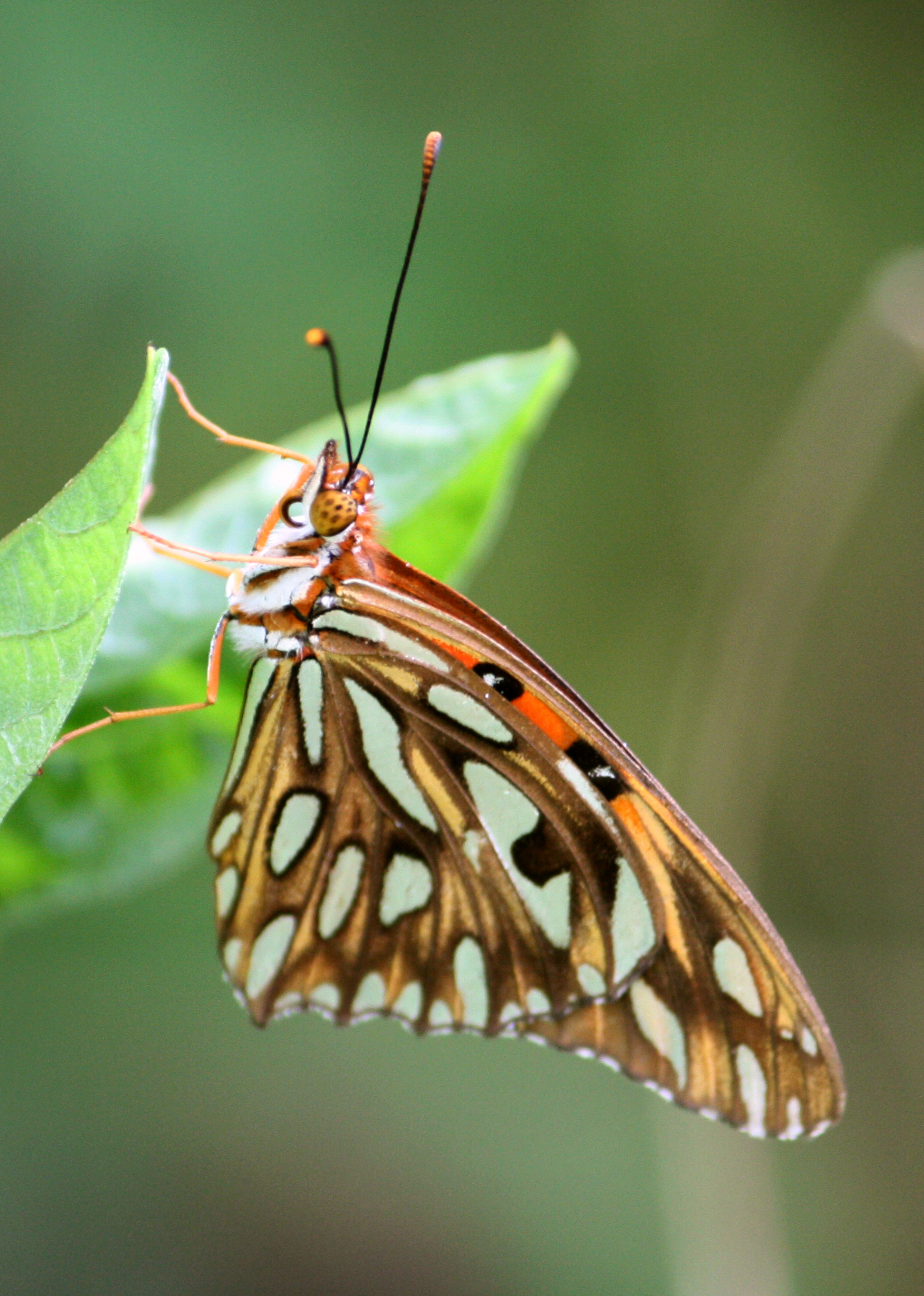
Gulf fritillary (Agraulis vanillae) in Cabrits National Park, Dominica

Fifty-five species of butterflies have been officially recorded in Dominica, an island-nation in the Caribbean Lesser Antilles.

Two species are endemic to Dominica: the Dominican hairstreak (Electrostrymon dominicana) and the Dominican snout (Libytheana fulvescens). An additional seven species are endemic to the Lesser Antilles: Godman's hairstreak (Allosmaitia piplea), bronze hairstreak (Electrostrymon angerona), Godman's leaf (Memphis dominicana), St Lucia mestra (Mestra cana), lesser whirlabout (Polites dictynna), broken dash skipper (Wallengrenia ophites), and the stub-tailed skipper (Urbanus obscurus).

== Hesperiidae - skippers ==
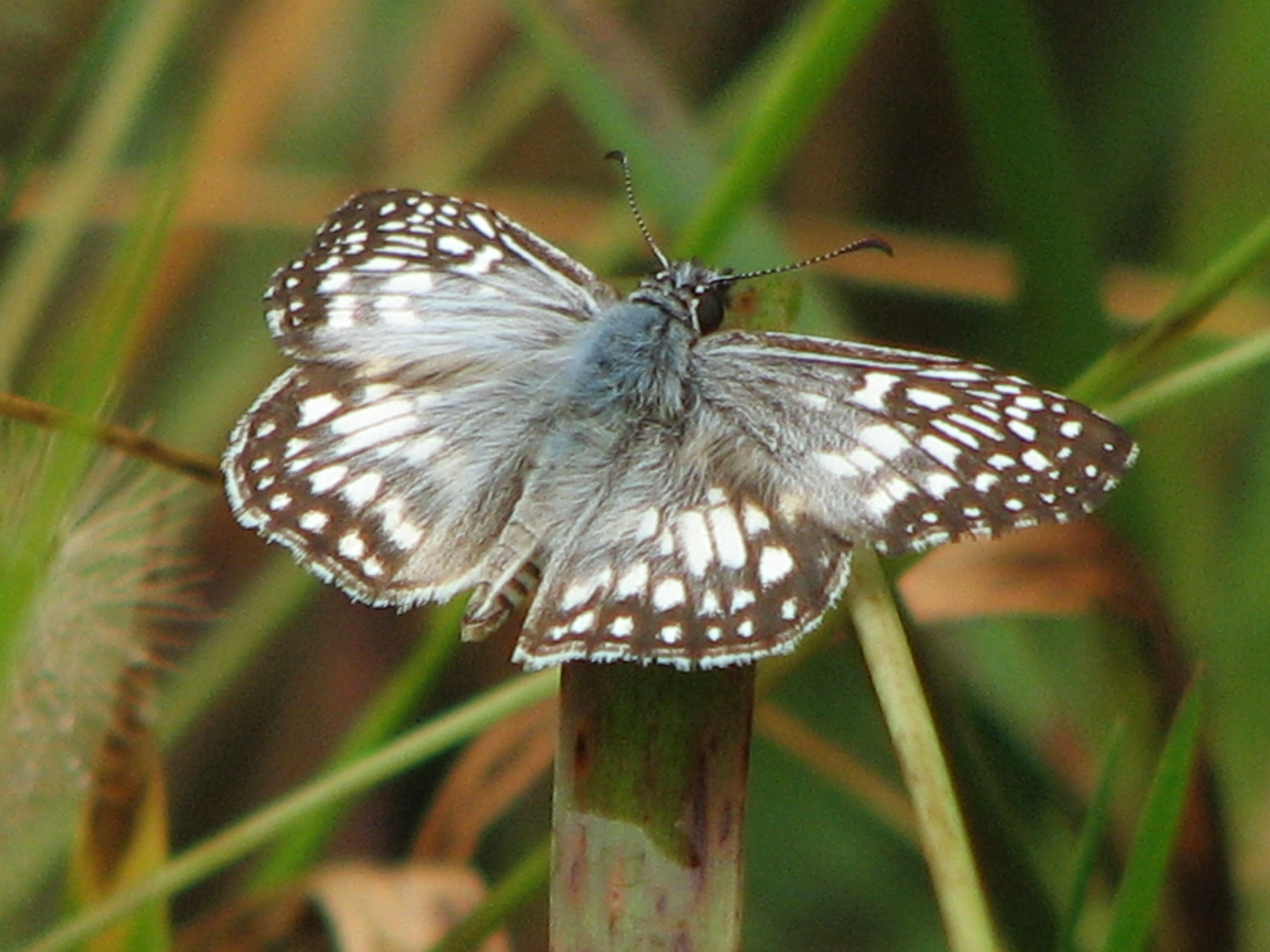
Tropical chequered skipper (Pyrgus oileus) (photo taken in Florida)

=== Subfamily Pyrginae ===
- Jung's dusky wing (Achlyodes mithridates)
- Zestos skipper (Epargyreus zestos)
- Hairy dusky wing (Ephyriades arcas)
- Jamaican dusky wing (Ephyriades brunnea)

=== Subfamily Eudaminae ===
- Roy's skipper (Astraptes anaphus)
- Hammock skipper (Polygonus leo)
- Manuel's skipper (Polygonus manueli)
- Mercury skipper (Proteides mercurius)
- Stub-tailed skipper (Urbanus obscurus) (Lesser Antillean endemic)
- Common long-tail skipper (Urbanus proteus)

=== Subfamily Hesperiinae ===
- Canna skipper (Calpodes ethlius)
- Fiery skipper (Hylephila phyleus)
- Nyctelius skipper (Nyctelius nyctelius)
- Sugar cane skipper (Panoquina sylvicola)
- Lesser whirlabout (Polites dictynna) (Lesser Antillean endemic)
- Tropical chequered skipper (Pyrgus oileus)
- Broken dash skipper (Wallengrenia ophites) (Lesser Antillean endemic)

== Libytheidae - snout butterflies ==
=== Subfamily Libytheinae ===
- Dominican snout (Libytheana fulvescens) (Dominican endemic)

== Lycaenidae - blues and hairstreaks ==
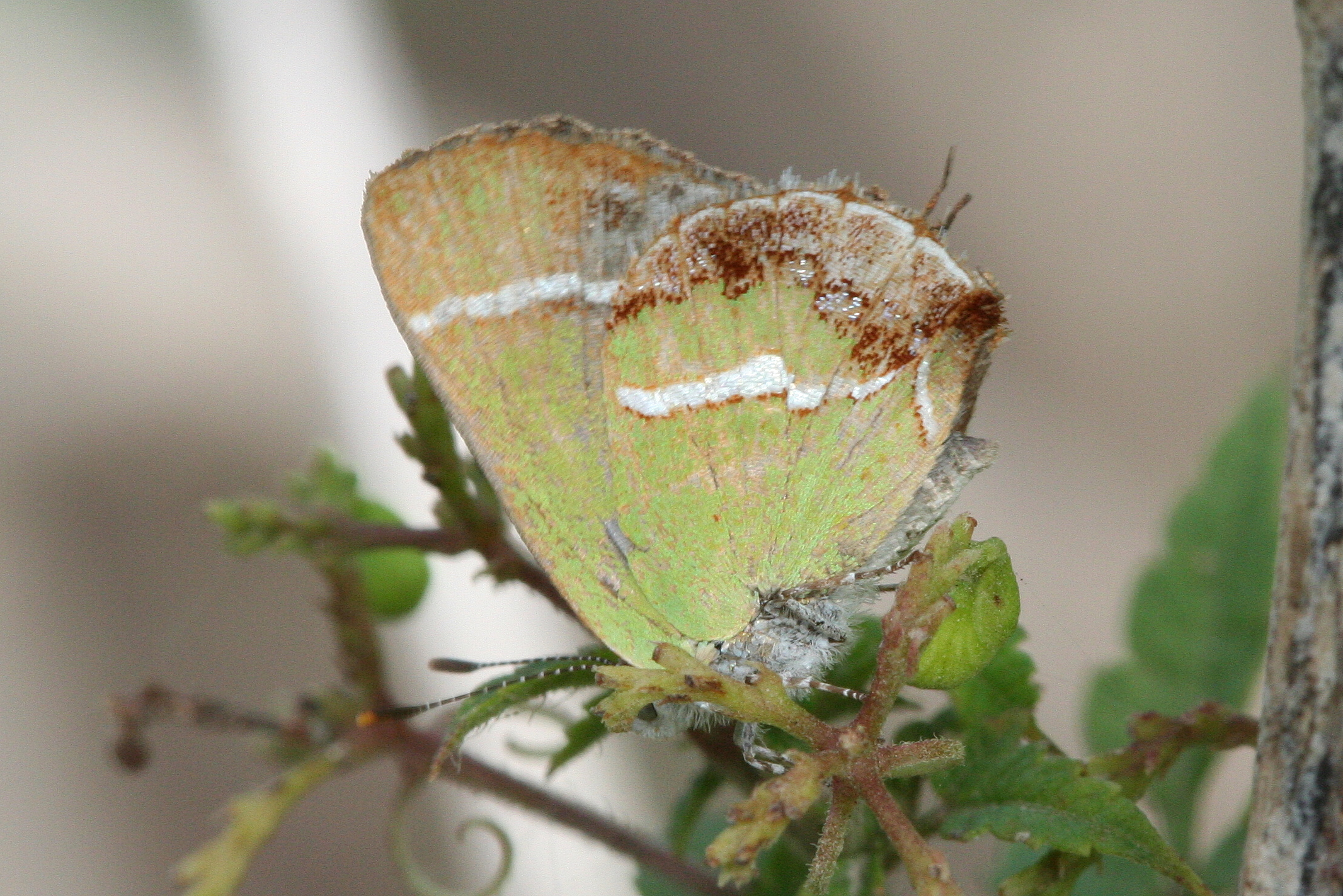
St. Christopher's hairstreak (Chlorostrymon simaethis) (photo taken in Texas)

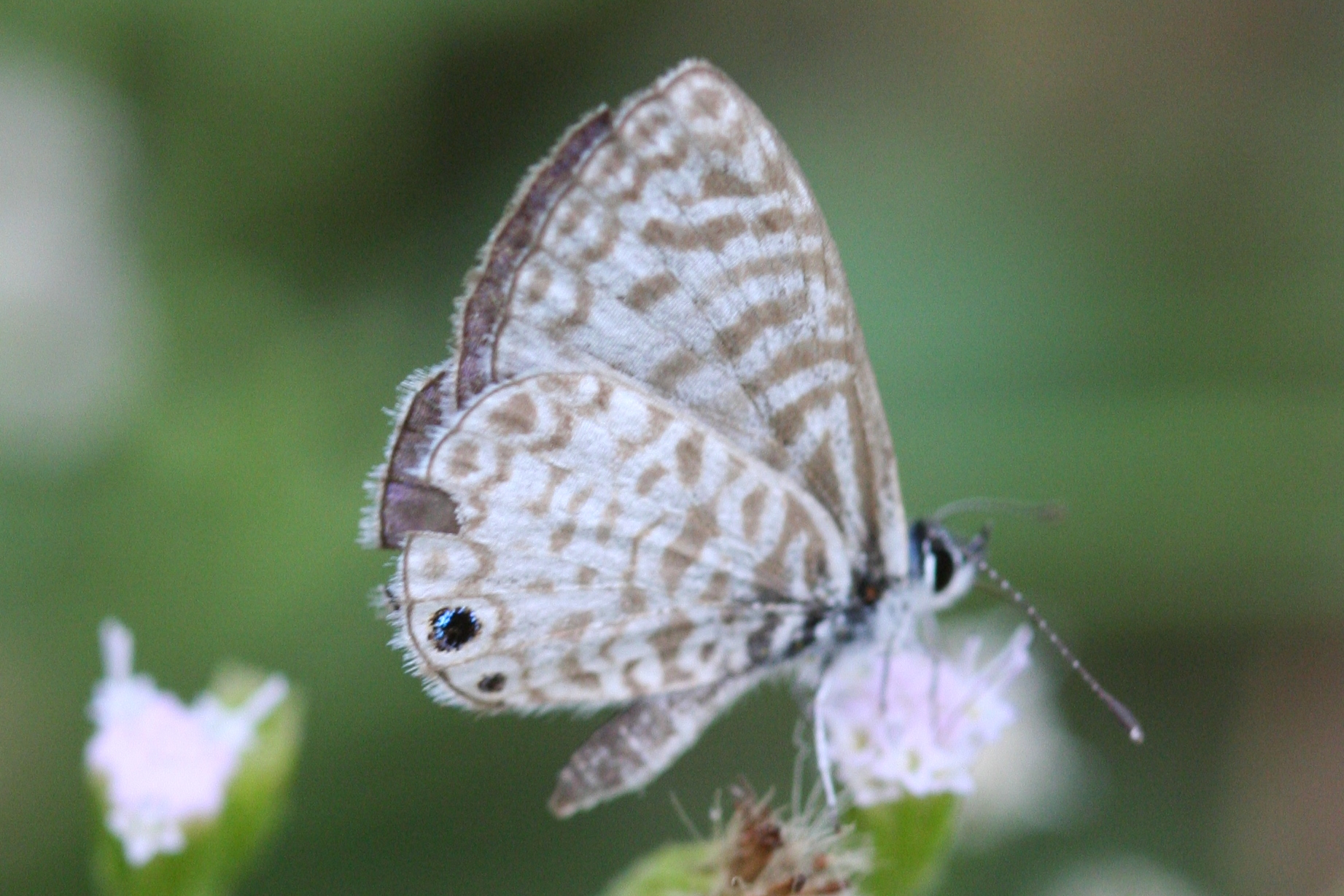
Cassius blue (Leptotes cassius) (photo taken in Texas)

=== Subfamily Theclinae ===
- St. Peter's hairstreak (Allosmaitia coelebs)
- Godman's hairstreak (Allosmaitia piplea) (Lesser Antillean endemic)
- Clench's hairstreak (Chlorostrymon maesites)
- St. Christopher's hairstreak (Chlorostrymon simaethis)
- Bronze hairstreak (Electrostrymon angerona) (Lesser Antillean endemic)
- Dominican hairstreak (Electrostrymon dominicana) (Dominican endemic)
- Drury's hairstreak (Strymon acis)
- Bubastus hairstreak (Strymon bubastus)
- Hewitson's hairstreak (Strymon columella)

=== Subfamily Polyommatinae ===
- Hanno blue (Hemiargus hanno)
- Cassius blue (Leptotes cassius)

== Nymphalidae - fritillaries ==
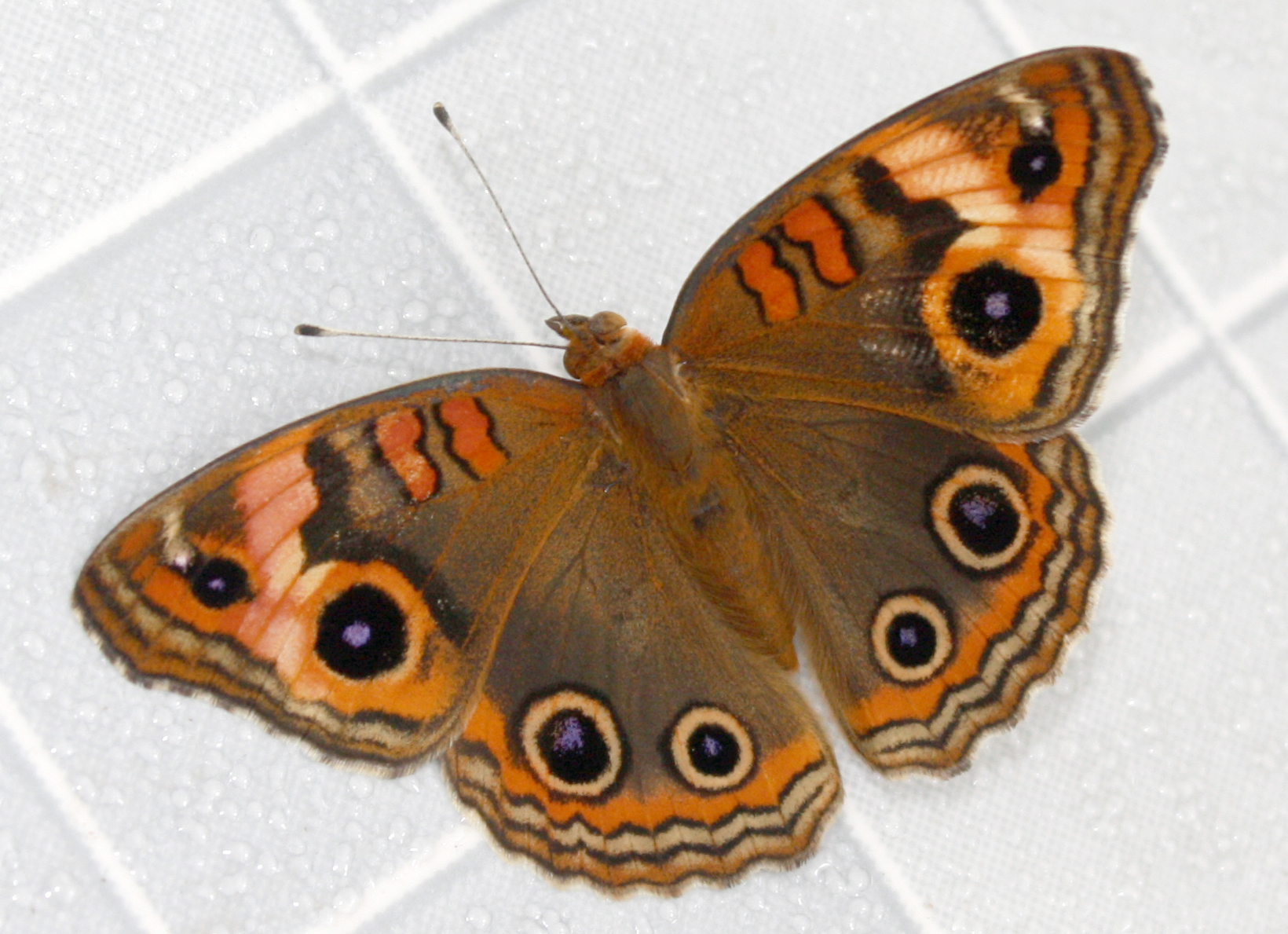
Caribbean buckeye (Junonia evarete) in Coulibistrie, Dominica.

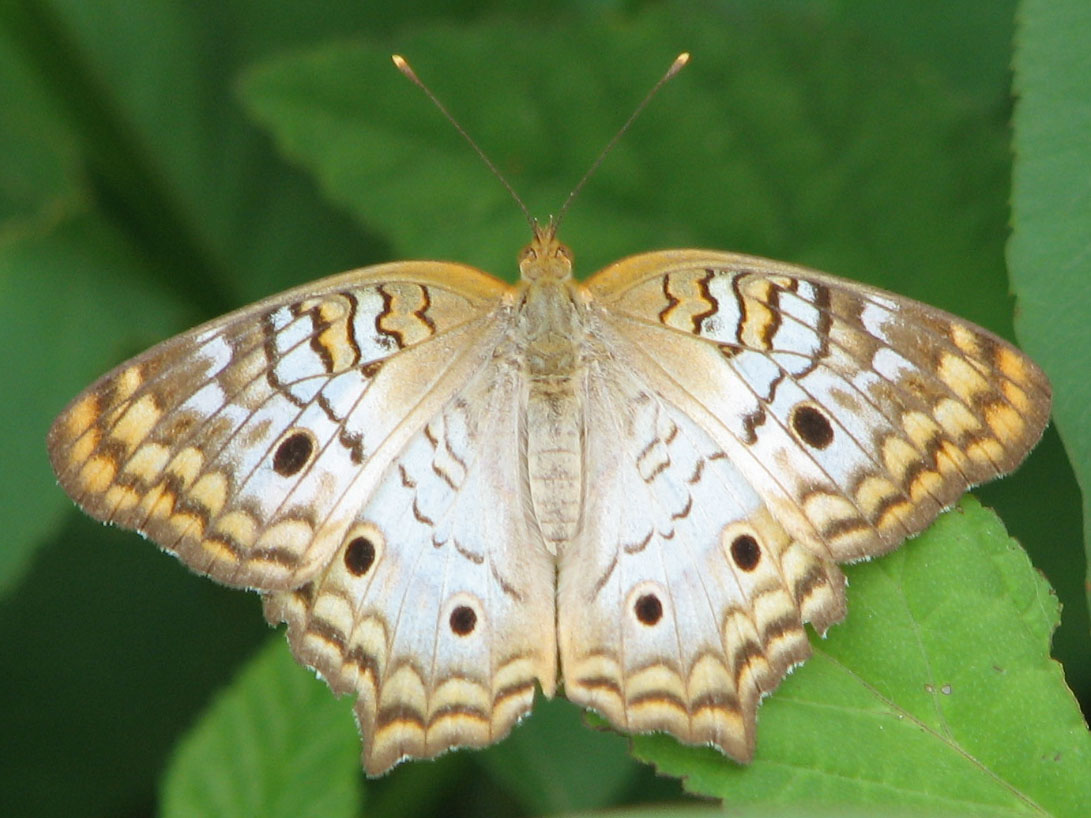
White peacock (Anartia jatrophae) (photo taken in Florida)

=== Subfamily Charaxinae ===
- Godman's leaf (Memphis dominicana) (Lesser Antillean endemic)

=== Subfamily Cyrestinae ===
- Southern dagger tail (Marpesia petreus)

=== Subfamily Danainae ===
- Monarch (Danaus plexippus)

=== Subfamily Heliconiinae ===
- Gulf fritillary (Agraulis vanillae)
- Silver spot (Dione juno)
- Julia butterfly (Dryas iulia)
- Zebra butterfly (Heliconius charithonia)

=== Subfamily Limenitidinae ===
- Red rim (Biblis hyperia)
- Orion cecropian (Historis odius)
- St Lucia mestra (Mestra cana) (Lesser Antillean endemic)

=== Subfamily Nymphalinae ===
- White peacock (Anartia jatrophae)
- Mimic (Hypolimnas misippus)
- Caribbean buckeye (Junonia evarete)
- Painted lady (Vanessa cardui)

== Papilionidae - swallowtails ==
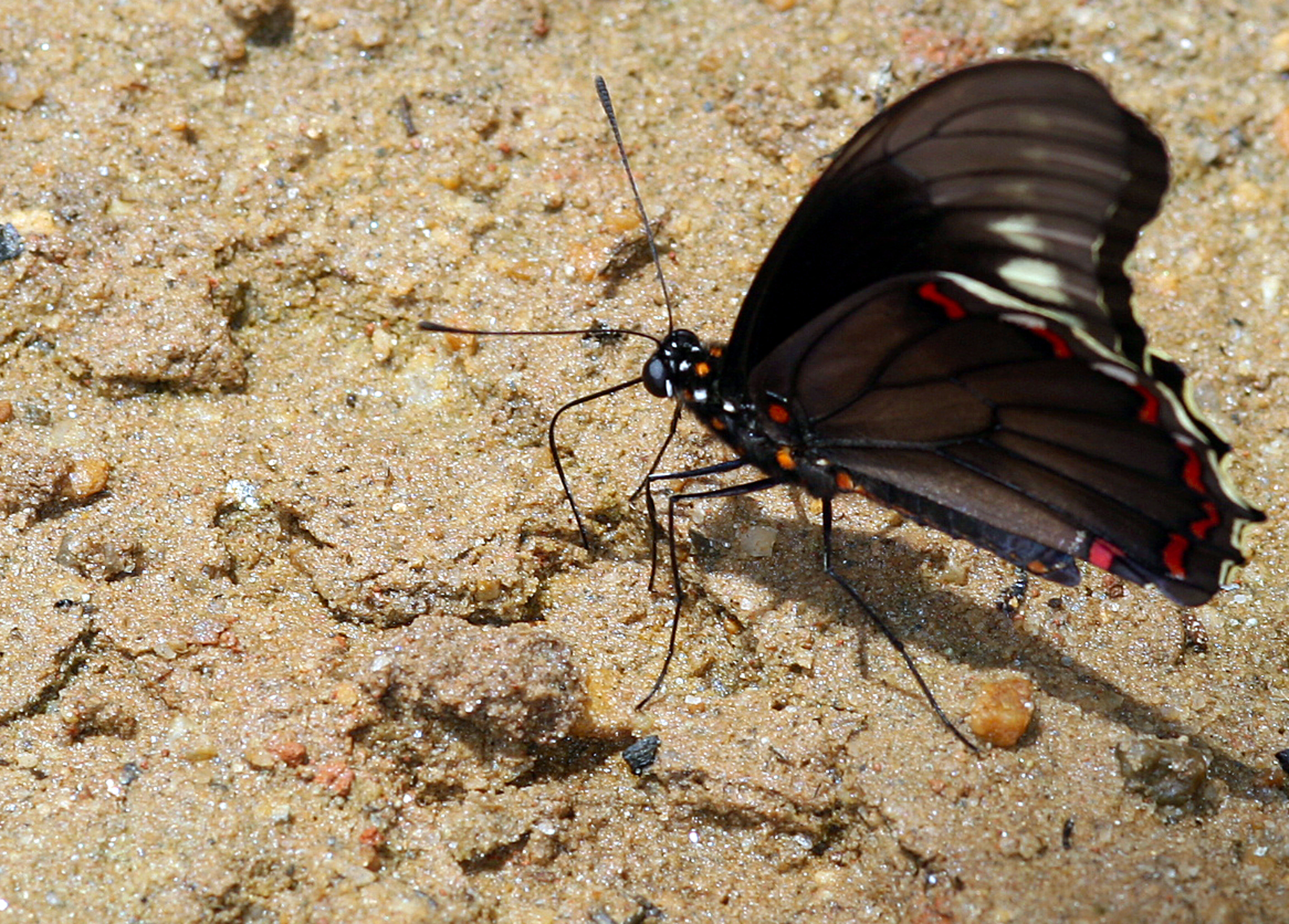
Polydamas swallowtail (Battus polydamas) (photo taken in Brazil).

=== Subfamily Papilioninae ===
- Polydamas swallowtail (Battus polydamas)

== Pieridae - whites and sulphurs ==
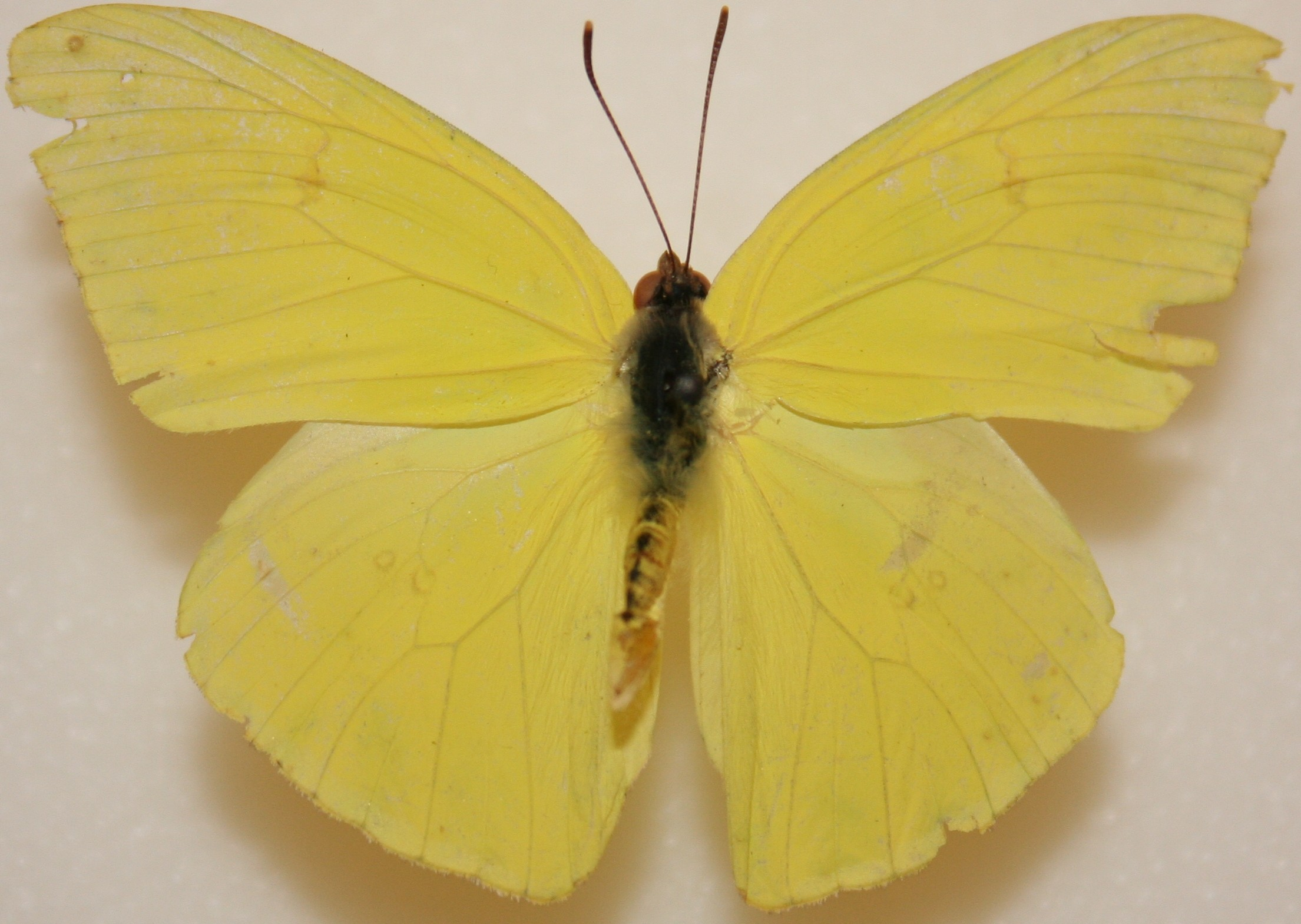
Cloudless sulphur (Phoebis sennae) (specimen from unknown locality).

=== Subfamily Pierinae ===
- Migrant sulphur (Aphrissa statira)
- Florida white (Appias drusilla)
- Great southern white (Ascia monuste)

=== Subfamily Coliadinae ===
- Barred sulphur (Eurema daira)
- False barred sulphur (Eurema elathea)
- Hall's sulphur (Eurema leuce)
- Little sulphur (Eurema lisa)
- Little yellow (Eurema venusta)
- Large orange sulphur (Phoebis agarithe)
- Cloudless sulphur (Phoebis sennae)
- Straight-line sulphur (Rhabdodryas trite or Phoebis trite)

== Disputed and unconfirmed ==
- Florida leafwing (Anaea troglodyta.) Evans & James (1997) considered the record of this species questionable.
- Unidentified Heliconius sp., noted by Evans & James (1997) to have been sighted on two occasions at the edge of dry forest.
