= Dominican snout =

Scientific classification
- Domain: Eukaryota
- Kingdom: Animalia
- Phylum: Arthropoda
- Class: Insecta
- Order: Lepidoptera
- Family: Nymphalidae
- Genus: Libytheana
- Species: L. fulvescens

Binomial name
- Libytheana fulvescens (Lathy, 1904)

Synonyms
- Libythea fulvescens Lathy, 1904

Species of butterfly

The Dominican snout (Libytheana fulvescens) is a species of snout butterfly that is endemic to Dominica, an island nation in the Caribbean Lesser Antilles.

== Taxonomy ==
It was first described in 1904, as Libythea fulvescens, by Percy Ireland Lathy of the Zoological Society of London. It was reassigned to the new genus Libytheana in 1943 by American entomologist Charles D. Michener, who split L. fulvescens and three other New World species from the Old World Libythea species.

== Habitat and distribution ==
The Dominican snout is rare, and locally distributed on Dominica in dry coastal forest and scrub, at such sites as Cabrits National Park, Morne Espagnole, and Morne Daniel.

== Behavior and ecology ==
Its behavior has been described as similar to Libytheana carinenta. Adults are active even in windy weather. It is not gregarious and probably does not migrate.

Generations are unknown but likely, because adults are found at different times of the year, though more commonly in the fall than the spring. Its host plant is possibly the iguana hackberry tree (Celtis iguanaea).

Adults have only been observed feeding on sap from wounded trees.

It is preyed on by the kingbird.
