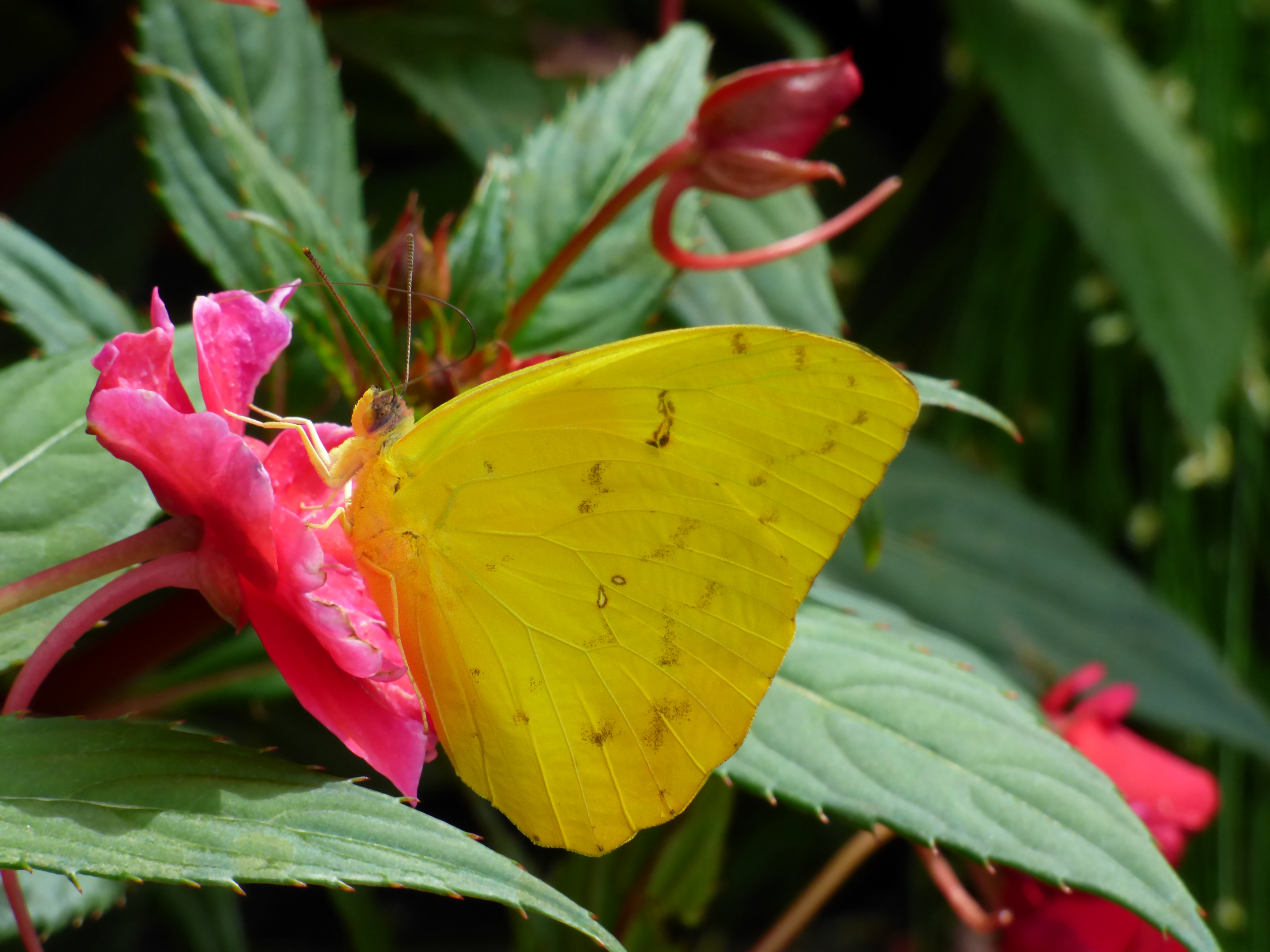
- Adult male - ventral view

Conservation status
- Secure (NatureServe)

Scientific classification
- Kingdom: Animalia
- Phylum: Arthropoda
- Class: Insecta
- Order: Lepidoptera
- Family: Pieridae
- Genus: Phoebis
- Species: P. philea

Binomial name
- Phoebis philea (Linnaeus, 1763)

Synonyms
- Papilio philea Linnaeus, 1763; Callidryas philea (Linnaeus, 1763); Papilio aricye Cramer, [1776]; Papilio melanippe Stoll, [1781]; Colias lollia Godart, 1819; Colias aricia Godart, 1819; Colias corday Hübner, [1819]

= Phoebis philea =

Species of butterfly

Phoebis philea, the orange-barred sulphur, is a species of butterfly found in the Americas including the Caribbean.

The wingspan is 68 to 80 mm. There are two to three generations per year in Florida and one in the northern part of the range with adults on wing from mid to late summer. The species habitat is in tropical scrub, gardens, fields, and forest edges. Orange-barred sulphurs are often found in large dense groups of mixed species, including the statira sulphur (Aphrissa statira), apricot sulphur (Phoebis argante), and the straight-line sulphur (Rhabdodryas trite). The species eats nectar from red-colored plants.

The larvae feed on Cassia species.

== Subspecies ==
- Phoebis philea philea (Linnaeus, 1763) (US to Brazil)
- Phoebis philea huebneri Fruhstorfer, 1907 (Cuba)
- Phoebis philea thalestris (Illiger, 1801) (Hispaniola)

== Gallery ==
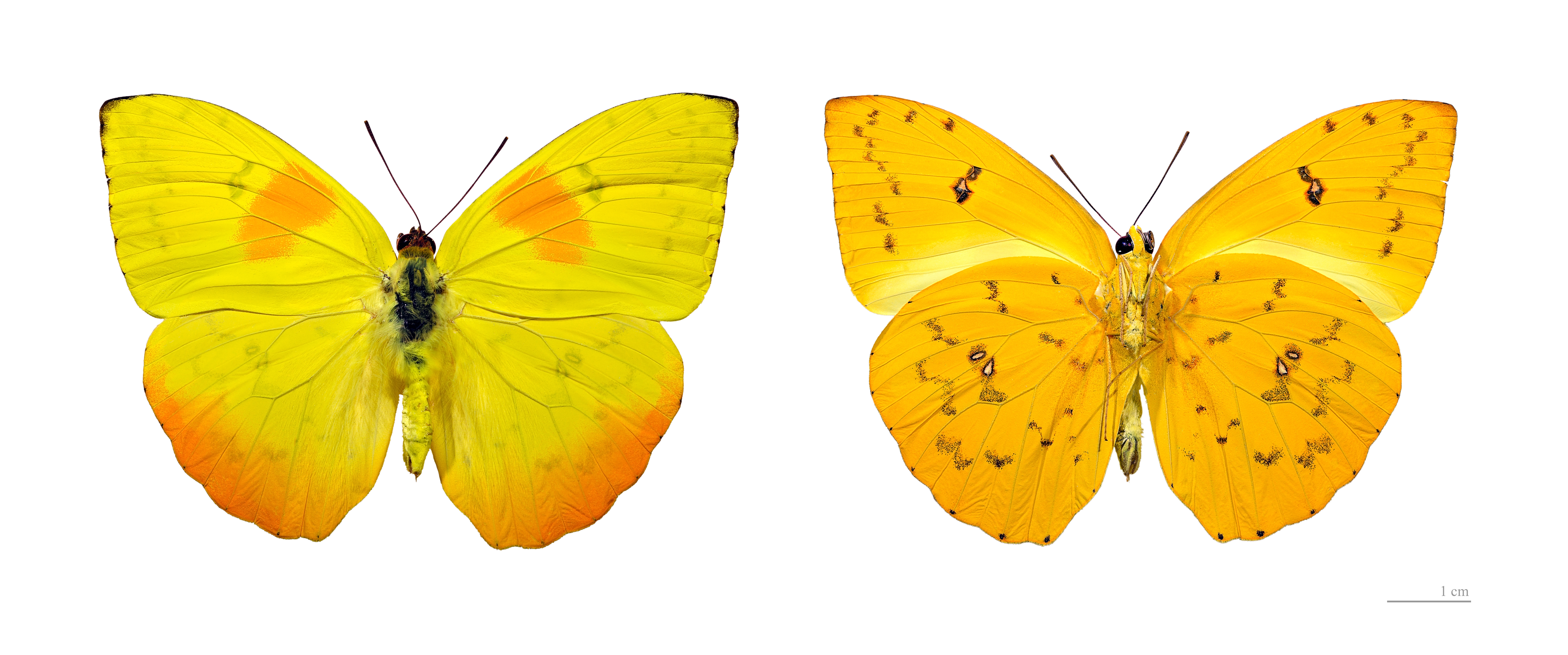
Pinned specimens, both sides

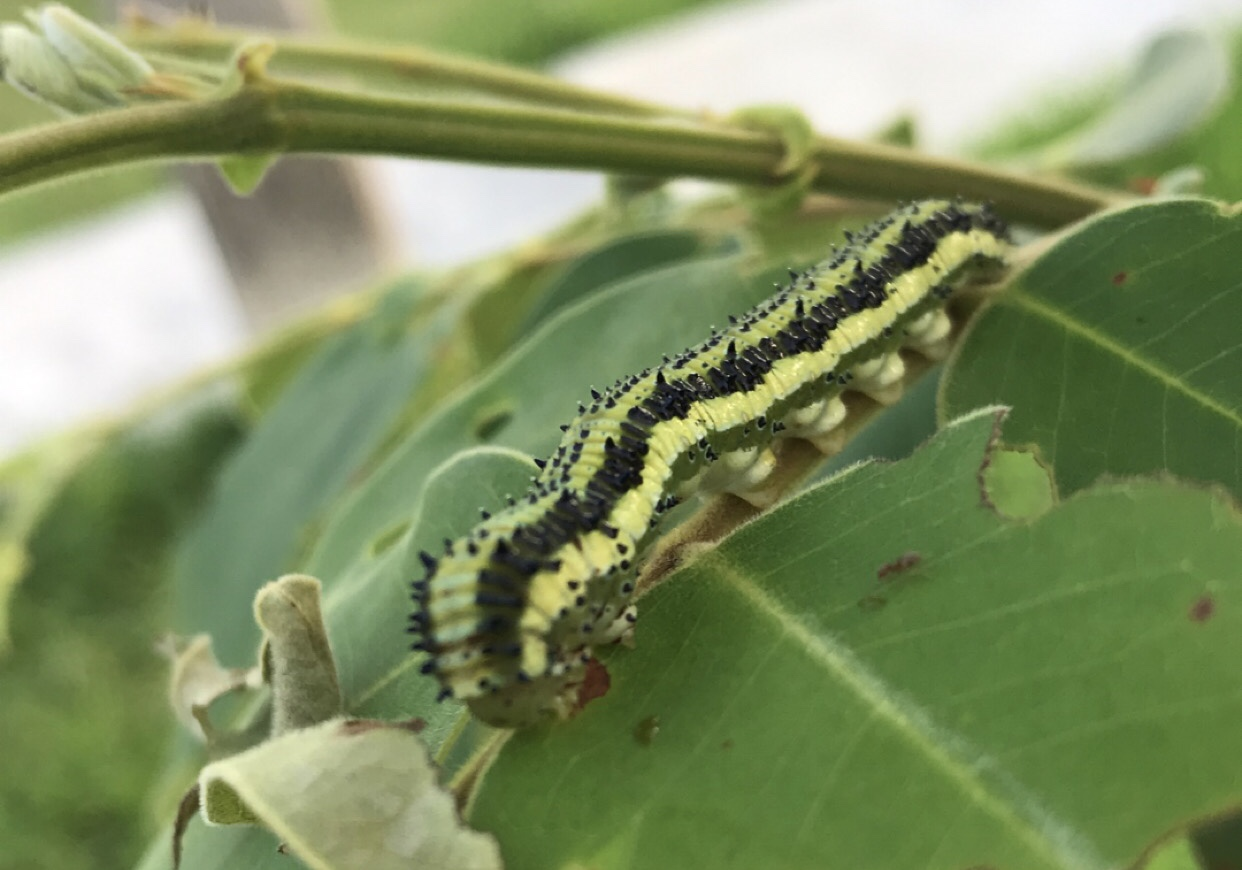
Larvae hosting on Cassia Bakeriana in Miami

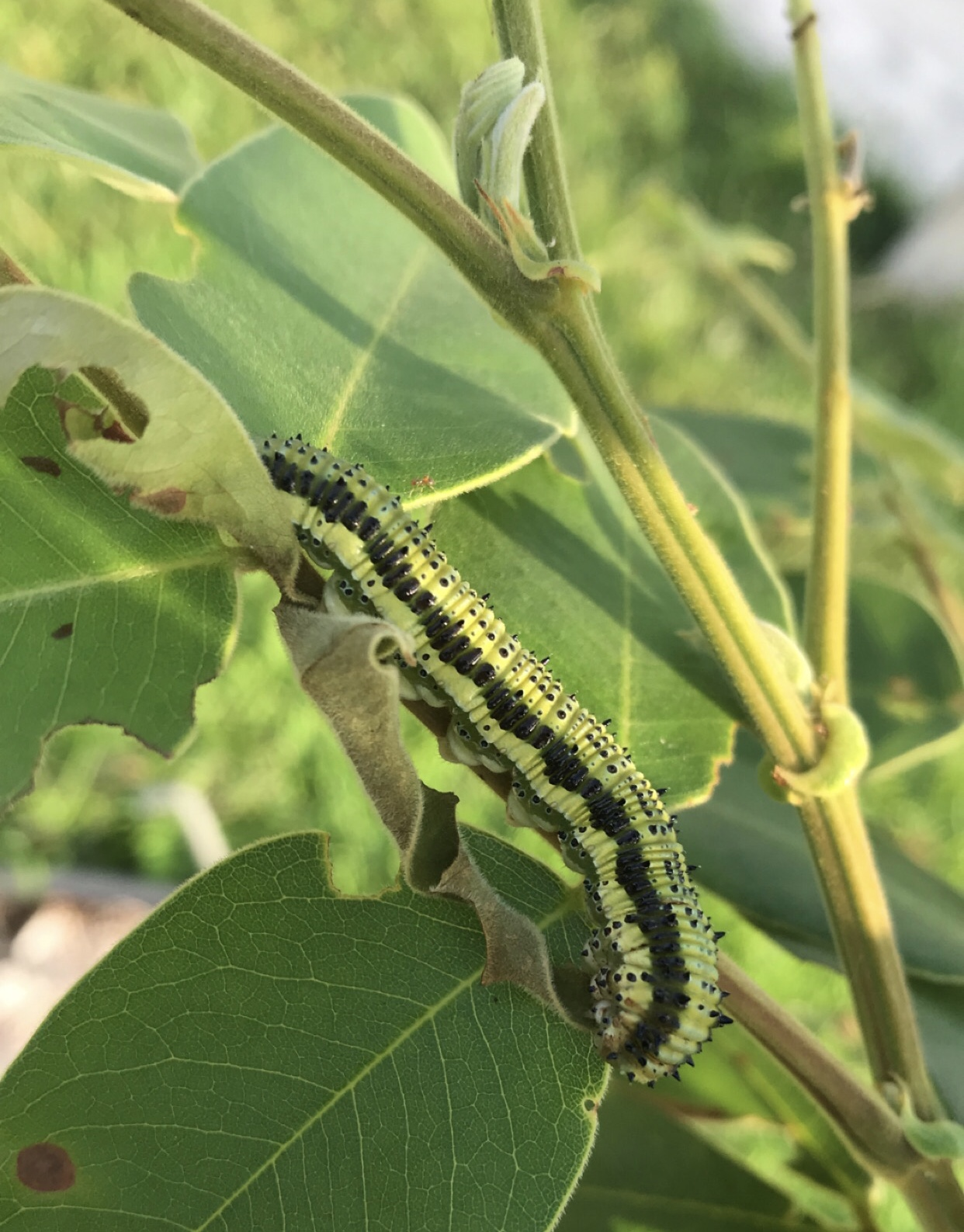
Larvae hosting on Cassia Bakeriana in Miami
