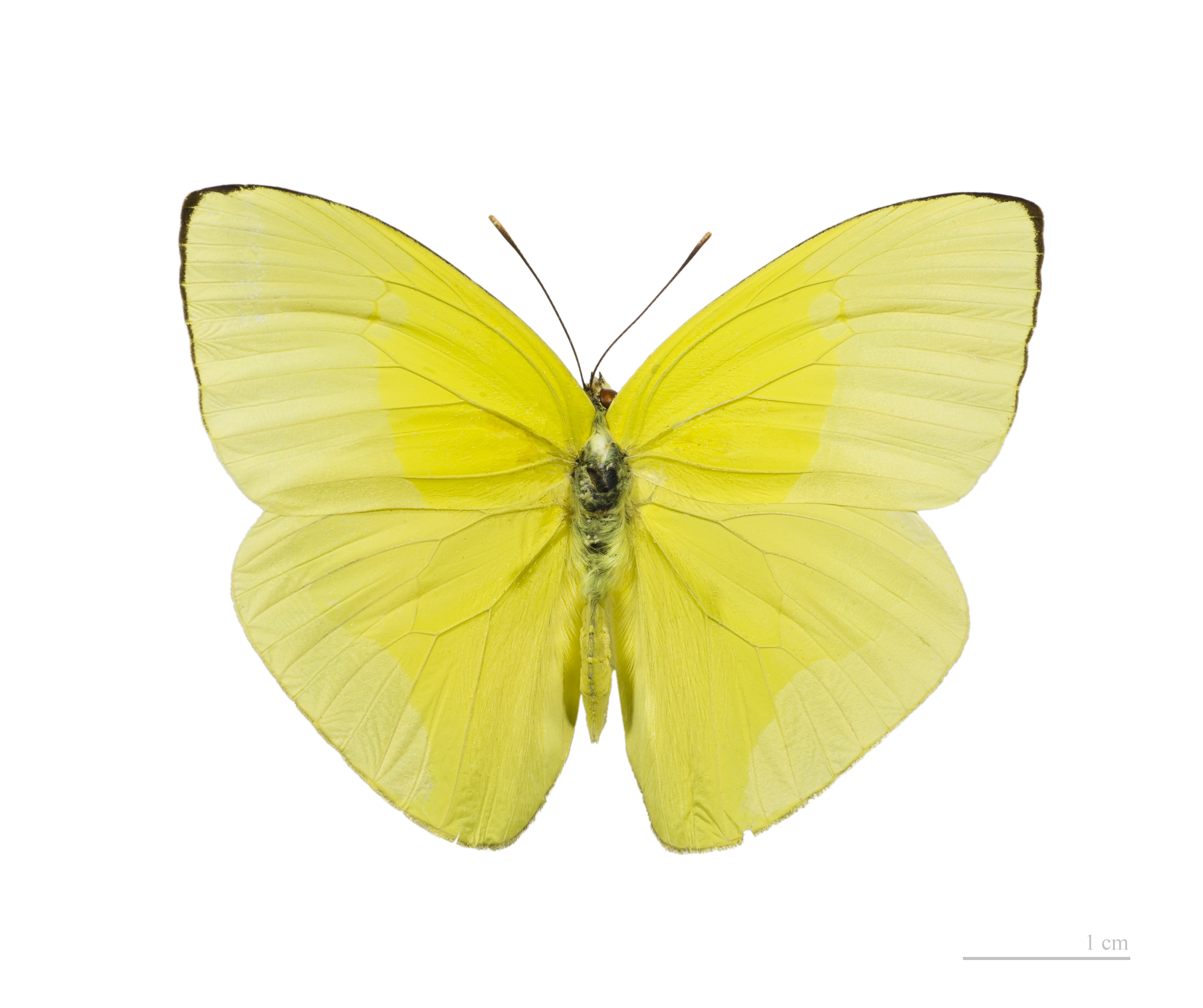

Scientific classification
- Kingdom: Animalia
- Phylum: Arthropoda
- Class: Insecta
- Order: Lepidoptera
- Family: Pieridae
- Genus: Aphrissa
- Species: A. fluminensis

Binomial name
- Aphrissa fluminensis (d'Almeida, 1921)

Synonyms
- Catopsilia fluminensis d'Almeida, 1921; Catopsilia etiolata Forbes, 1927; Aphrissa statira var. palleola Zikán, 1940; Phoebis (Aphrissa) statira statira f. discoflava Bryk, 1953

= Aphrissa fluminensis =

Rio de Janeiro sulphur

Species of butterfly

Aphrissa fluminensis, the Rio de Janeiro sulphur, is a butterfly in the family Pieridae. It is found in Costa Rica, Brazil (Rio de Janeiro, Amazonas), and Peru.
