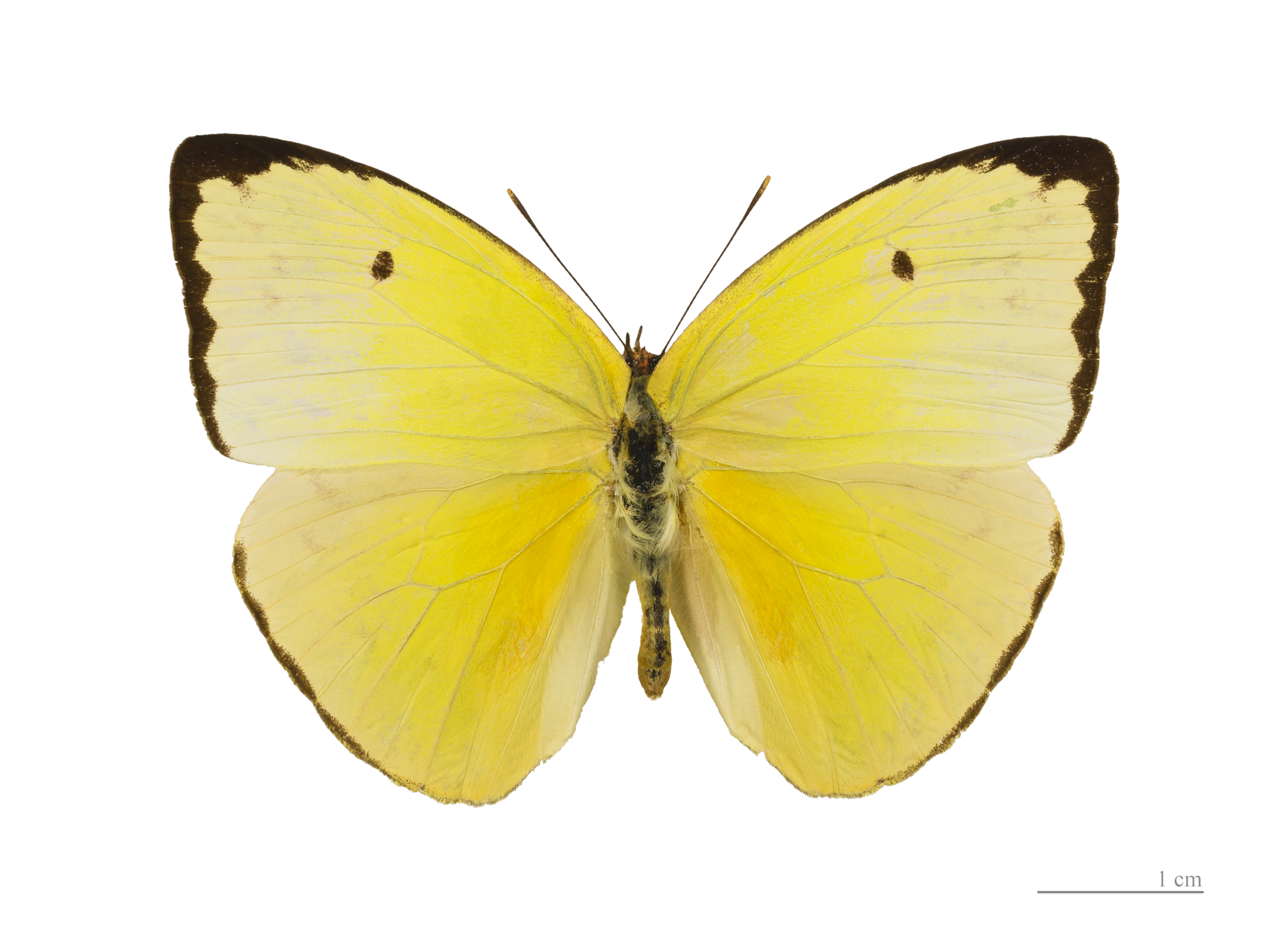
- Aphrissa statira statira

Scientific classification
- Kingdom: Animalia
- Phylum: Arthropoda
- Clade: Pancrustacea
- Class: Insecta
- Order: Lepidoptera
- Family: Pieridae
- Tribe: Coliadini
- Genus: Aphrissa; Butler, 1873

Species
- See text

= Aphrissa =

Butterfly genus in family Pieridae

Aphrissa is a genus of butterflies in the family Pieridae found in Central and South America.

== Species ==
Listed alphabetically:

- Aphrissa boisduvalii (C. & R. Felder, 1861) – Boisduval's sulphur (Mexico to Peru)
- Aphrissa fluminensis (d'Almeida, 1921) – Rio de Janeiro sulphur (Costa Rica, Brazil, Peru)
- Aphrissa godartiana (Swainson, 1821) – Godart's sulphur (Hispaniola, Jamaica)
- Aphrissa neleis (Boisduval, 1836) – pink-spot sulphur (Caribbean)
- Aphrissa orbis (Poey, 1832) – orbed sulphur, orbis sulphur (Caribbean)
- Aphrissa schausi (Avinoff, 1926) – Schaus' sulphur (Mexico, Guatemala)
- Aphrissa statira (Cramer, [1777]) – statira sulphur, pale sulphur (Florida to Mexico, Caribbean)
- Aphrissa wallacei (C. & R. Felder, 1862) – Wallace's sulphur (Costa Rica to Argentina)
