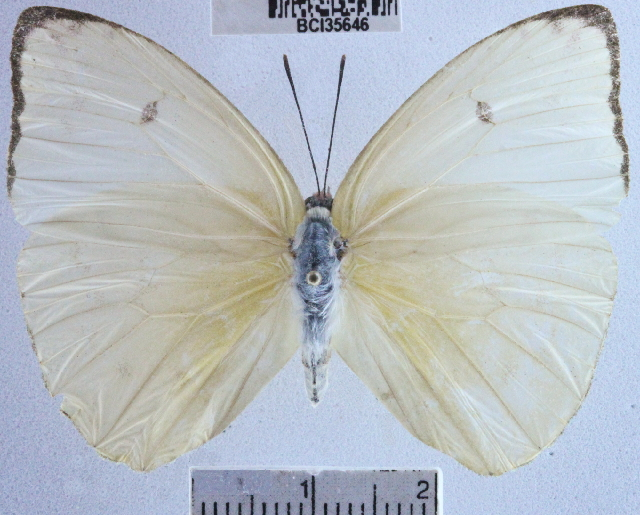

Scientific classification
- Kingdom: Animalia
- Phylum: Arthropoda
- Class: Insecta
- Order: Lepidoptera
- Family: Pieridae
- Genus: Aphrissa
- Species: A. boisduvalii

Binomial name
- Aphrissa boisduvalii (C. & R. Felder, 1861)

Synonyms
- Callidryas boisduvalii C. & R. Felder, 1861; Phoebis boisduvalii; Aphrissa butleri Scudder, 1875

= Aphrissa boisduvalii =

Boisduval's sulphur

Species of butterfly

Aphrissa boisduvalii, the Boisduval's sulphur, is a butterfly in the family Pieridae. It is found from Guatemala to Brazil, Colombia and Bolivia.
