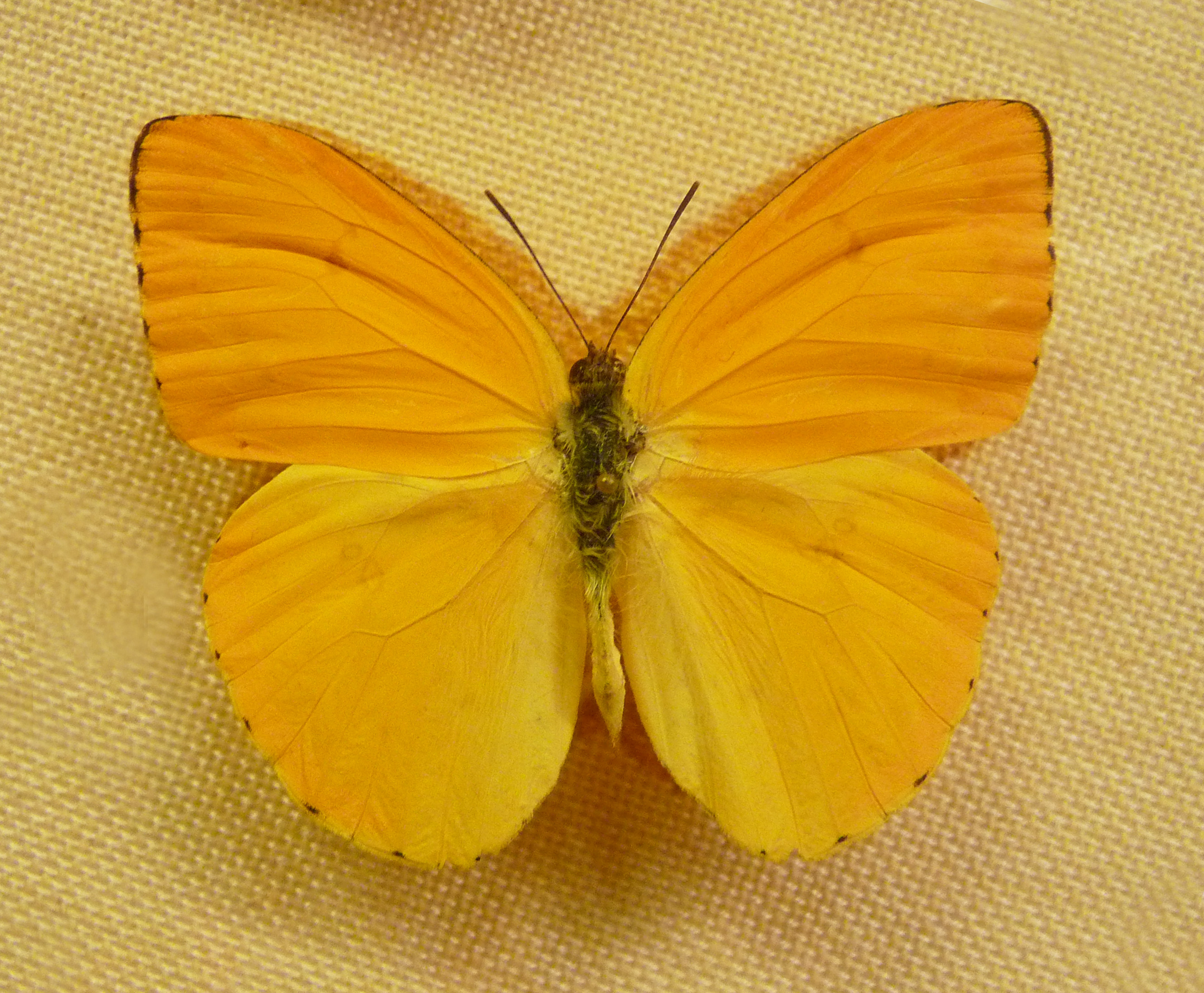
- From Mexico, dorsal side
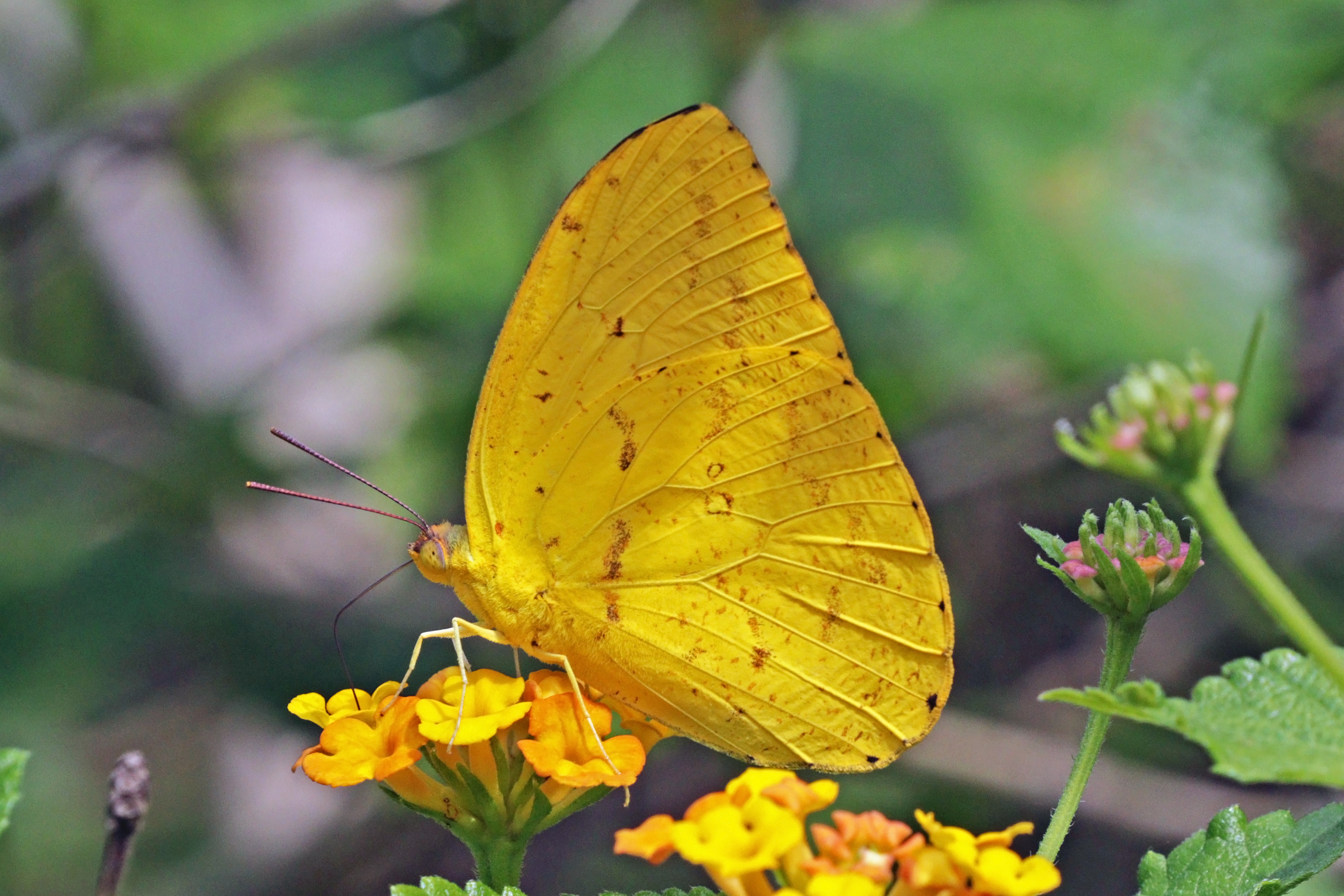
- From Panama

Scientific classification
- Kingdom: Animalia
- Phylum: Arthropoda
- Class: Insecta
- Order: Lepidoptera
- Family: Pieridae
- Genus: Phoebis
- Species: P. argante

Binomial name
- Phoebis argante (Fabricius, 1775)

Synonyms
- Papilio argante Fabricius, 1775; Papilio cipris Cramer, [1777]; Papilio volcanica Perry, 1811; Phoebis cypris Hübner, [1819]; Colias cnidia Godart, 1819; Papilio aurantia Larrañaga, 1923; Papilio larra Fabricius, 1798; Papilio hersilia Cramer, [1777]; Papilio xanthe Sepp, [1847] (preocc. Denis & Schiffermüller, 1775); Callidryas minuscula Butler, 1869; Callidryas fornax Butler, 1871; Callidryas rorata Butler, 1869; Phoebis argante f. adela Brown, 1929

= Phoebis argante =

Species of butterfly

Phoebis argante, the apricot sulphur or Argante giant sulphur, is a butterfly in the family Pieridae.

== Description ==
Phoebis argante has a wingspan of about 54–67 millimetres (2.1–2.6 in). The uppersides of the male's wings are bright orange with a thin black or dark brown border on forewings. The hindwings are slightly paler and have two small whitish spots in the middle. The basic colour of the females vary from white to yellow, with dark borders.

Larvae feed on Pentaclethra macroloba, Cassia biflora, Cassia fruticosa, Inga vera and Inga ruiziana.

== Distribution ==
This species can be found from Mexico up to Peru, in the Antilles and in Cuba.

== Subspecies ==
Specimens from Mexico to Panama do not have a recognised subspecies. The following subspecies are recognised:

- P. a. argante (Brazil, Uruguay)
- P. a. larra (Fabricius, 1798) (Guyana, Suriname)
- P. a. minuscula (Butler, 1869) (Cuba)
- P. a. rorata (Butler, 1869) (Dominican Republic)
- P. a. comstocki Avinoff, 1944 (Jamaica)
- P. a. chincha Lamas, 1976 (Peru)
- P. a. martini Comstock, 1944

R. a. argante puddles with other yellows and sulphurs including the stratia sulphur (Aphrissa statira), straight-line sulphur (Rhabdodryas trite) and orange-banded sulphur (Phoebis philea).

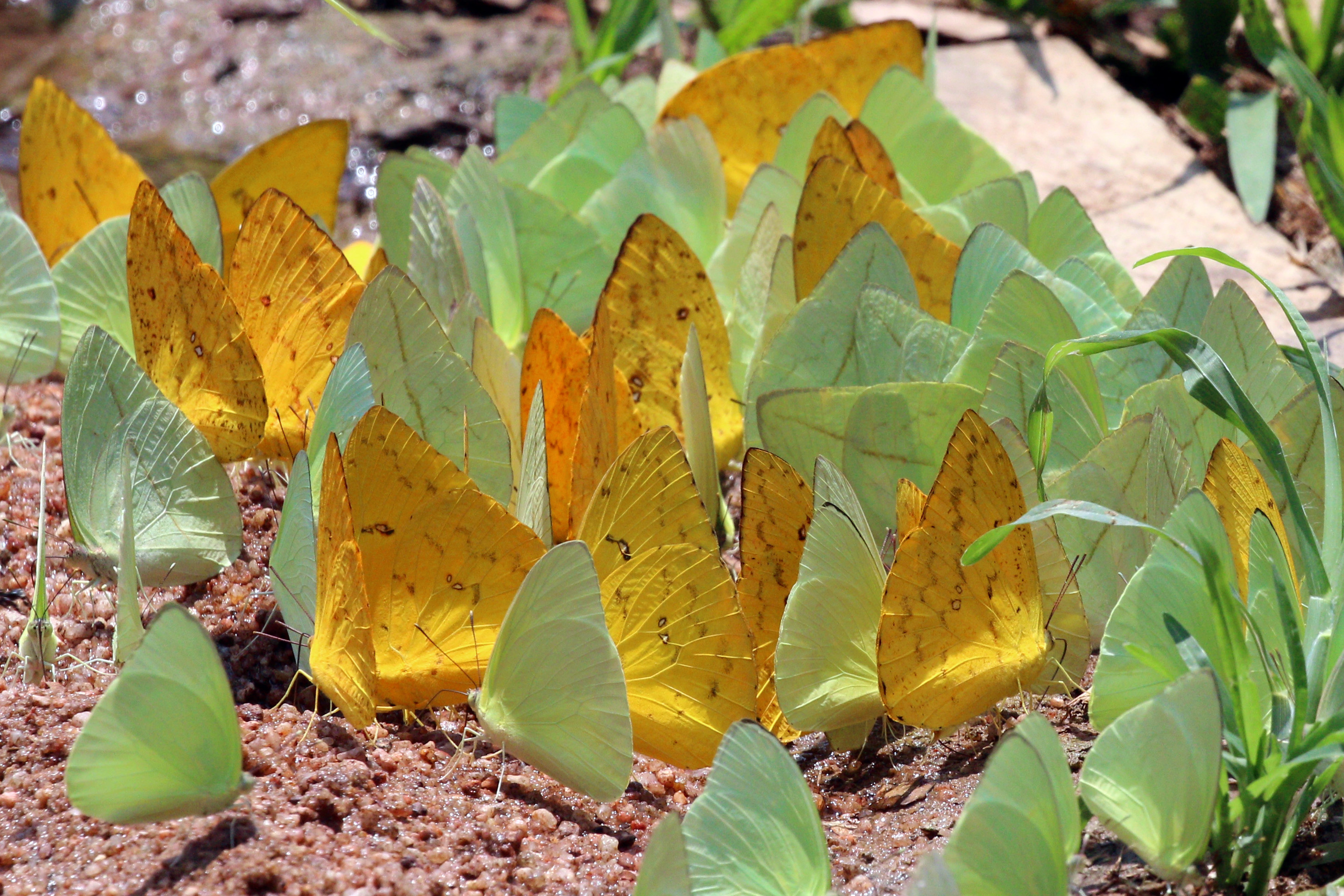
P. a. argante

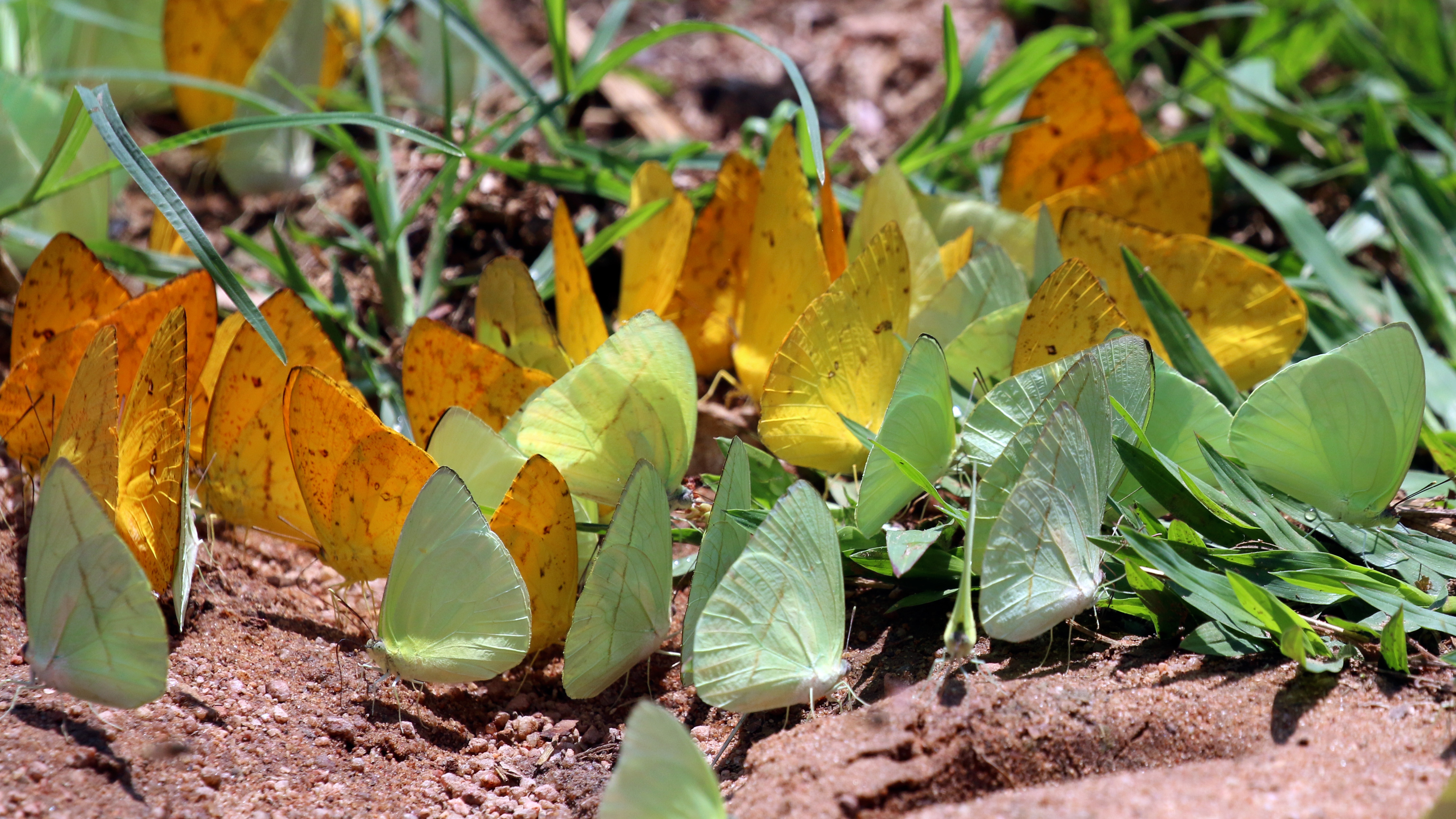
Puddling, Cristalino River
Southern Amazon, Brazil

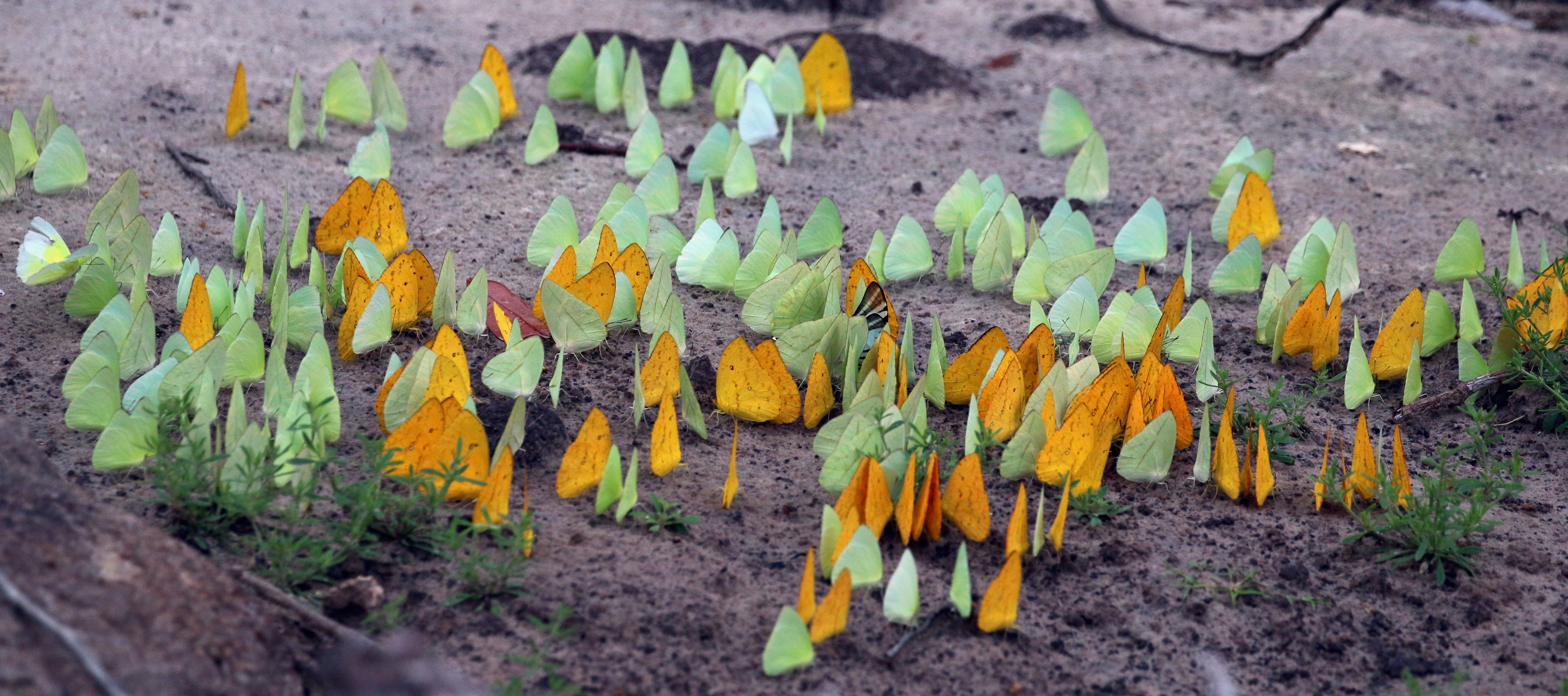
Puddling, Cristalino River
