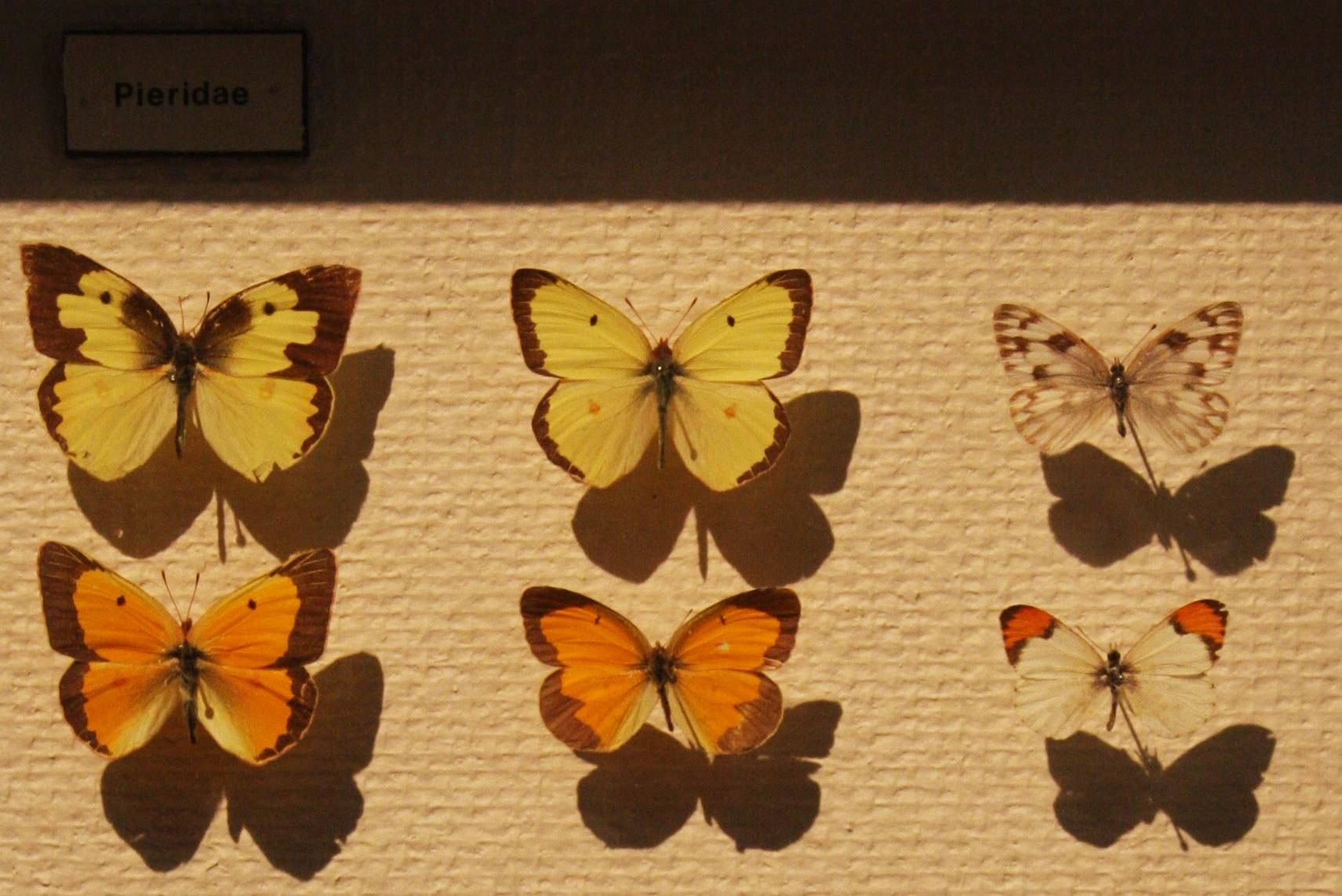
- Butterflies in the family Pieridae

Scientific classification
- Kingdom: Animalia
- Phylum: Arthropoda
- Class: Insecta
- Order: Lepidoptera
- Family: Pieridae
- Genus: Aphrissa
- Species: A. orbis

Binomial name
- Aphrissa orbis (Poey, 1832)

Synonyms
- Callidryas orbis Poey, 1832; Phoebis orbis

= Aphrissa orbis =

Orbed sulphur

Species of butterfly

Aphrissa orbis, the orbed sulphur, is a butterfly in the family Pieridae. It is native to Hispaniola and Cuba but is a very rare stray to Florida. The habitat consists of tropical moist forests above 500 meters.

The wingspan is 63–76 mm (2.5–3.0 in). There are multiple generations per year on Cuba and Hispaniola. They feed on flower nectar of various flowers, including Ageratum conyzoides, Antigonon leptotus and Hibiscus species.

The larvae feed on Poinciana pulcherrima.

== Subspecies ==
The following subspecies are recognised:

- Aphrissa orbis orbis (Cuba)
- Aphrissa orbis browni (Munroe, 1947) (Haiti)
