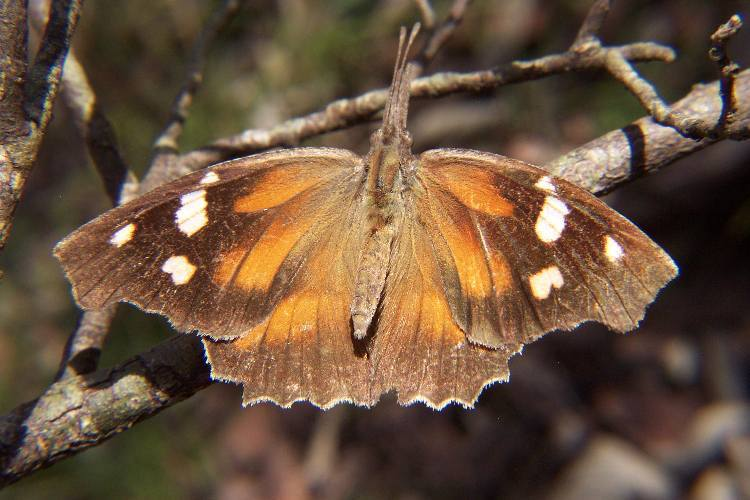
- American snout butterfly (Libytheana carinenta)

Scientific classification
- Kingdom: Animalia
- Phylum: Arthropoda
- Class: Insecta
- Order: Lepidoptera
- Family: Nymphalidae
- Subfamily: Libytheinae
- Genus: Libytheana; Michener, 1943

Specie
- See text

= Libytheana =

Genus of brush-footed butterflies

Libytheana is a genus of nymphalid butterflies in the snout butterfly subfamily, Libytheinae.

Libytheana carinenta is found in both North and South America and is known to be migratory. The other species in the genus are restricted to the Caribbean.

== Classification ==
- Source: The higher classification of Nymphalidae, at Nymphalidae.net
- Note: Names preceded by an equal sign (=) are synonyms, homonyms, rejected names or invalid names.

Subfamily Libytheinae Boisduval, 1833

- Libytheana Michener, 1943
  - Libytheana carinenta (Cramer, 1777) (original name = Papilio carinenta Cramer, 1777) type species
    - Libytheana carinenta carinenta (Cramer, 1777)
    - Libytheana carinenta mexicana Michener, 1943
    - Libytheana carinenta bachmanii (Kirtland, 1851) (original name = Libythea bachmanii Kirtland, 1851; = Libythea bachmanii f. kirtlandi Field, 1938)
    - Libytheana carinenta larvata (Strecker, 1877)
  - Libytheana terena (Godart, 1819) (original name = Libythea terena Godart, 1819)
  - Libytheana motya (Hübner, 1823) (original name = Hecaërge motya Hübner, [1823])
  - Libytheana fulvescens (Lathy, 1904) (original name = Libythea fulvescens Lathy, 1904)
