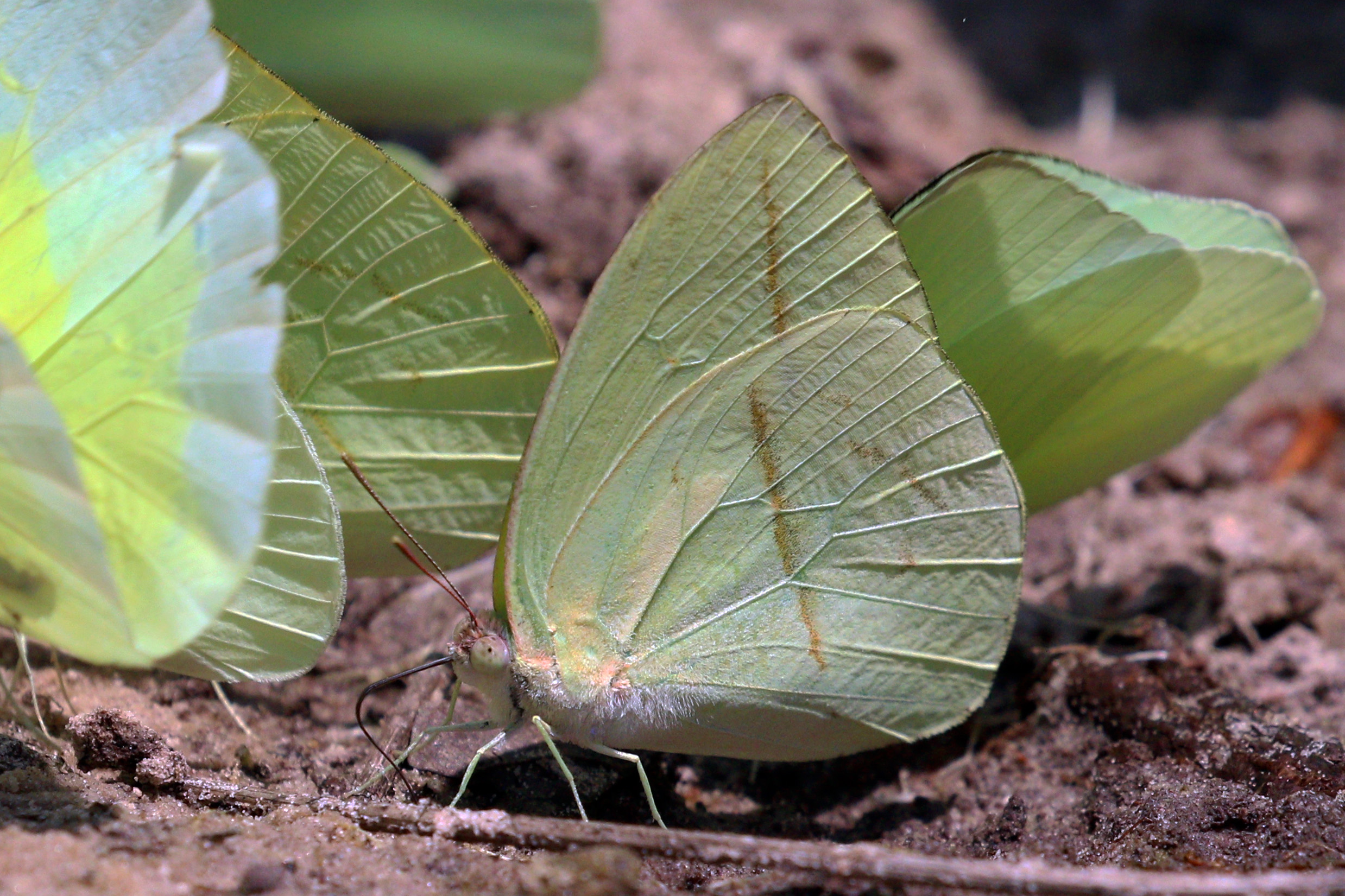
- At the Cristalino River, Southern Amazon, Brazil
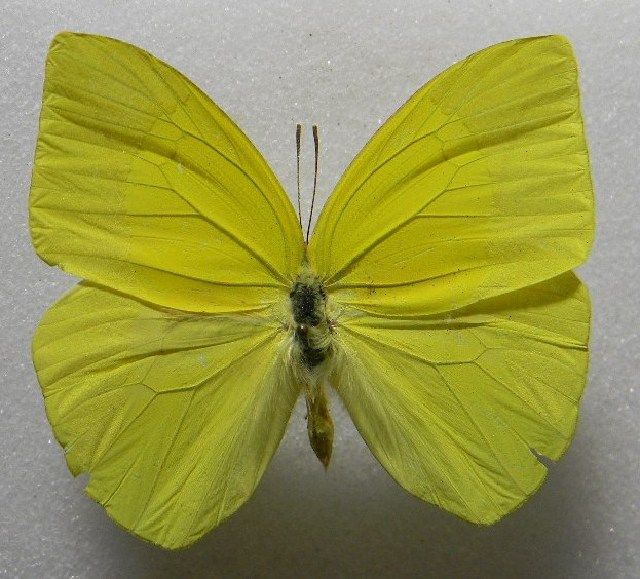

Scientific classification
- Kingdom: Animalia
- Phylum: Arthropoda
- Clade: Pancrustacea
- Class: Insecta
- Order: Lepidoptera
- Family: Pieridae
- Subfamily: Coliadinae
- Tribe: Coliadini
- Genus: Rhabdodryas; Godman & Salvin, [1889]
- Species: R. trite

Binomial name
- Rhabdodryas trite (Linnaeus, 1758)

= Rhabdodryas =

Monotypic butterfly genus in family Pieridae

Rhabdodryas is a genus of butterflies in the family Pieridae. The only species is the straight-line sulphur (Rhabdodryas trite).

R. trite puddles with other yellows and sulphurs including the statira sulphur (Aphrissa statira) and apricot sulphur (Phoebis argante); and orange-banded sulphur (Phoebis philea).

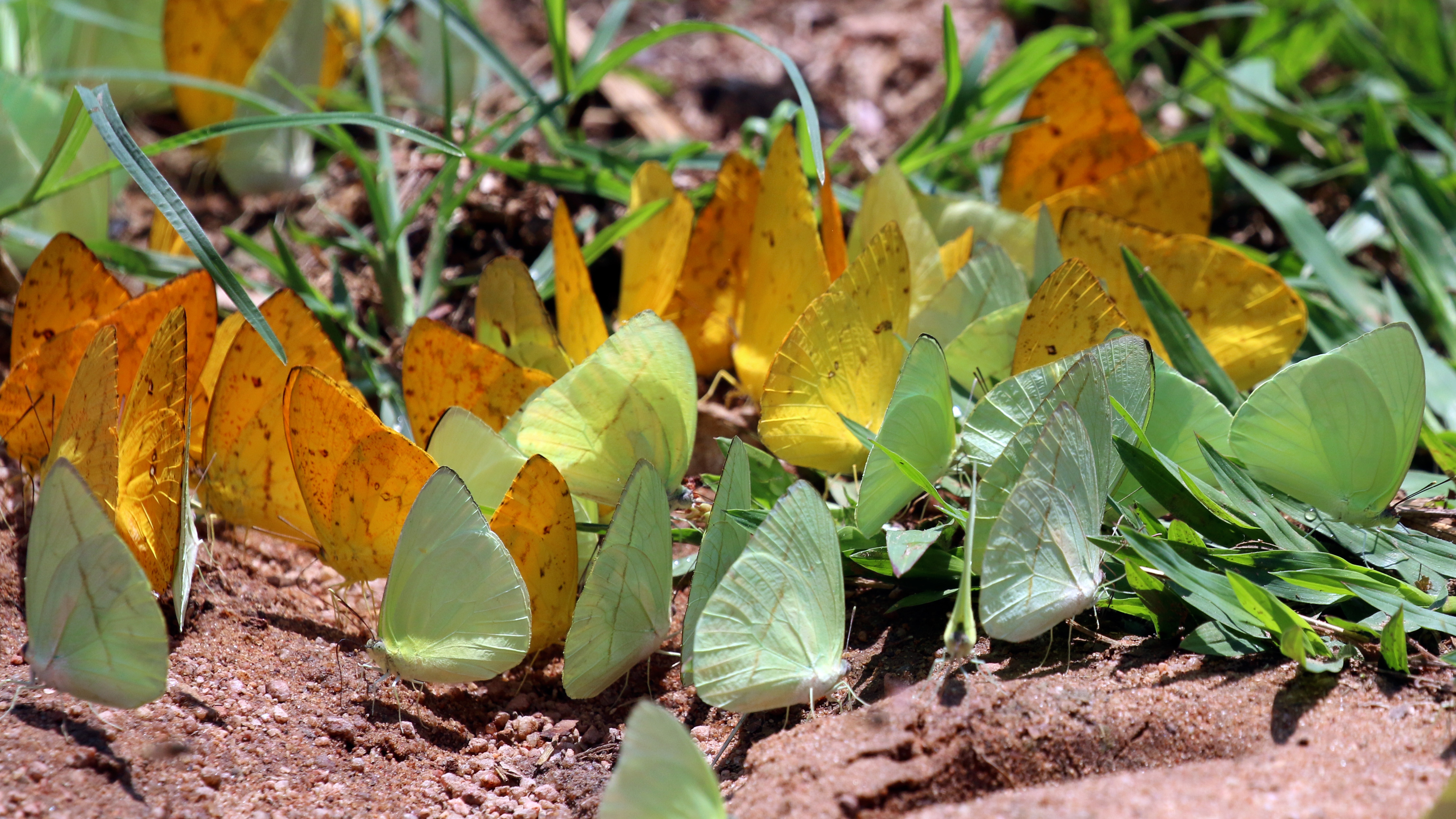
Puddling, Cristalino River
Southern Amazon, Brazil

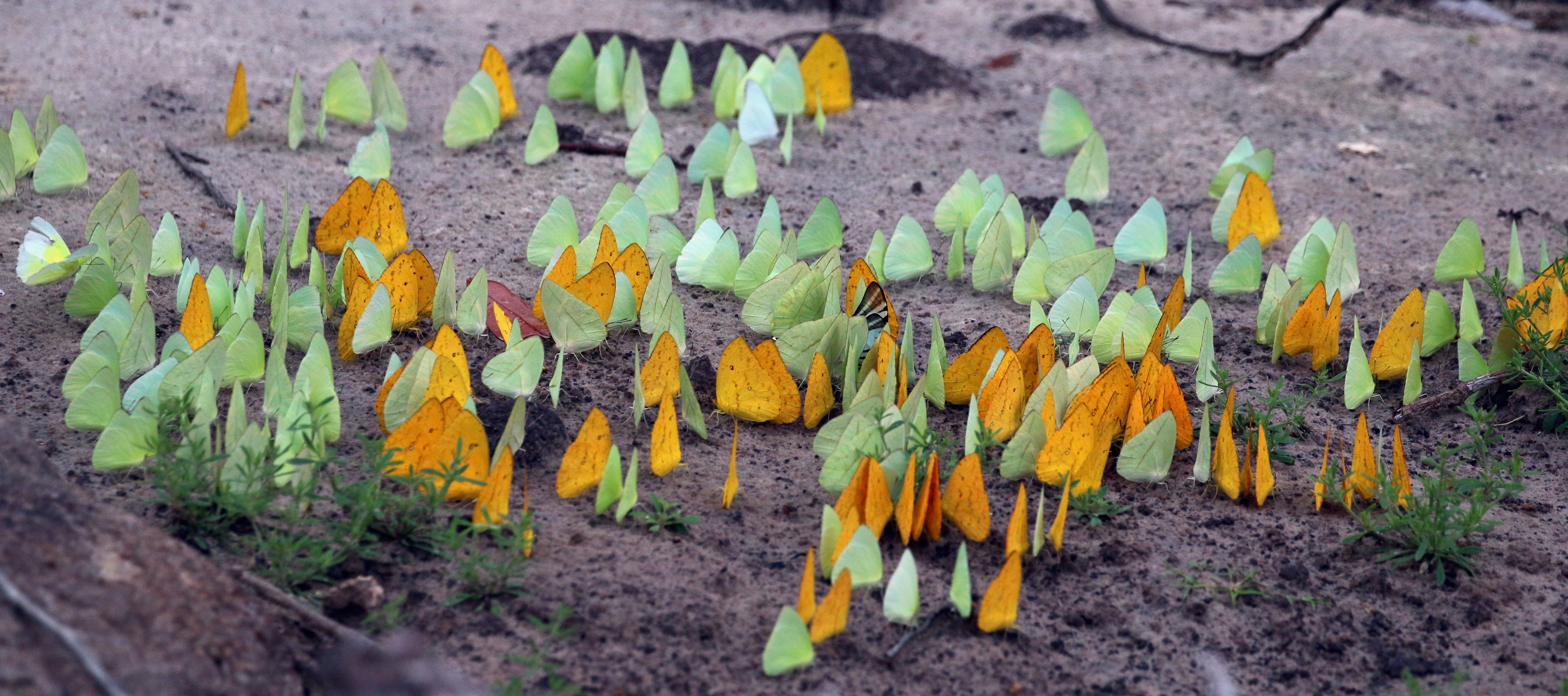
Puddling, Cristalino River
