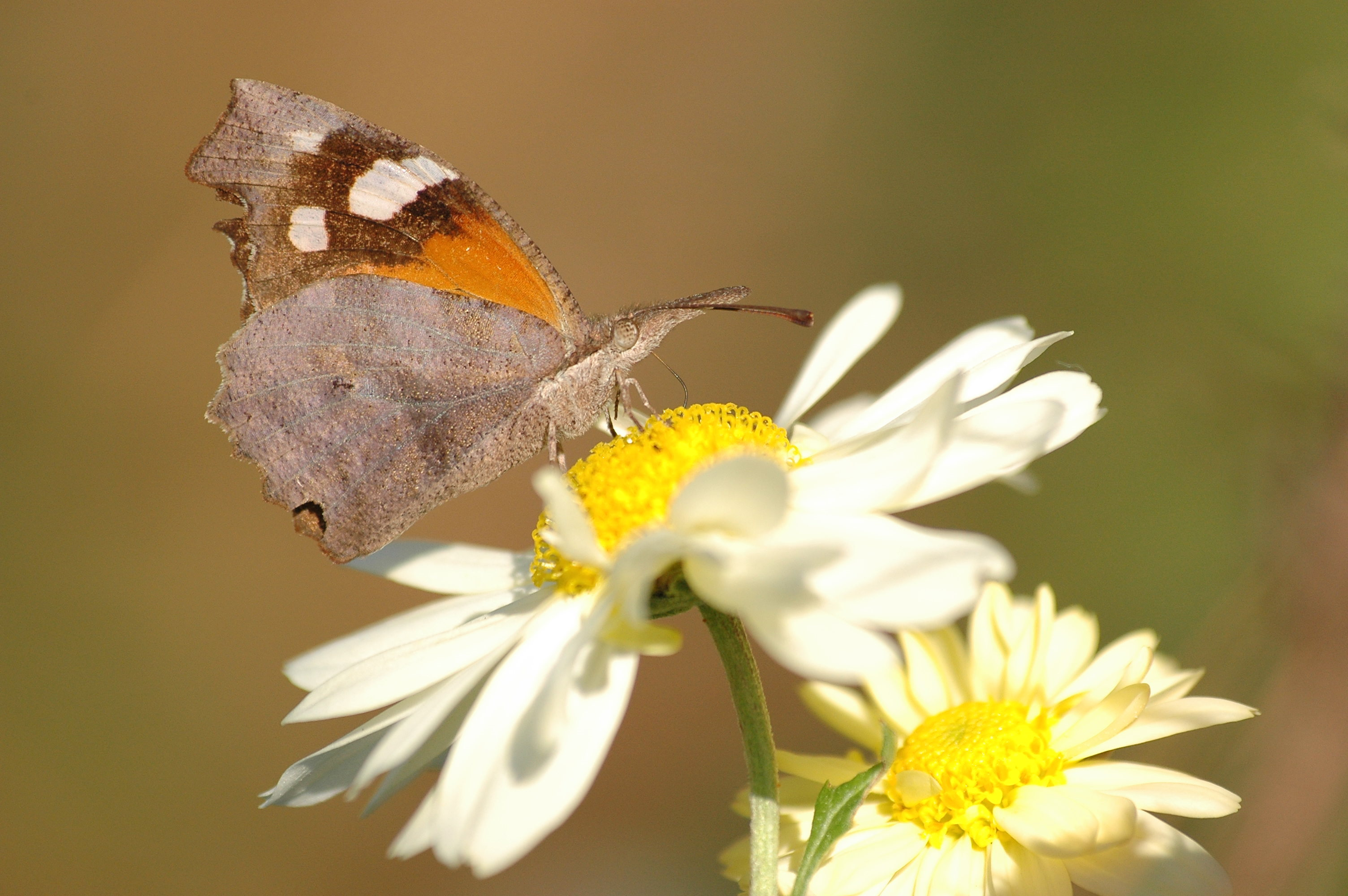

Conservation status
- Secure (NatureServe)

- Least Concern (IUCN 3.1)

Scientific classification
- Kingdom: Animalia
- Phylum: Arthropoda
- Clade: Pancrustacea
- Class: Insecta
- Order: Lepidoptera
- Family: Nymphalidae
- Genus: Libytheana
- Species: L. carinenta

Binomial name
- Libytheana carinenta (Cramer, 1777)

Synonyms
- Libytheana bachmanii Kirtland, 1851

= American snout =

Species of butterfly

Libytheana carinenta also called the American snout butterfly or common snout butterfly is a member of the subfamily Libytheinae in the brush-footed butterfly family, Nymphalidae. This species is found in both North and South America. The larval host plants are Celtis species on which the eggs are laid singly. Massive migrations of this species often attract attention in the Texas and Mexican newspapers.

== Description ==
Snout butterflies have prominent elongated mouthparts (labial palpi) which, in concert with the antennae, give the appearance of the petiole (stem) of a dead leaf. Snouts often take advantage of this superb camouflage by hanging upside down under a twig, making them nearly invisible. Wings are patterned black-brown with white and orange markings. The forewings have a distinctive squared off, hook-like (falcate) tip.

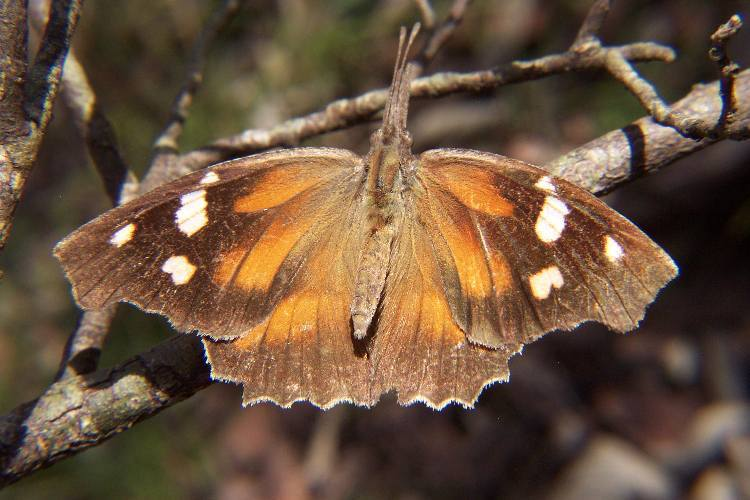
Dorsal view

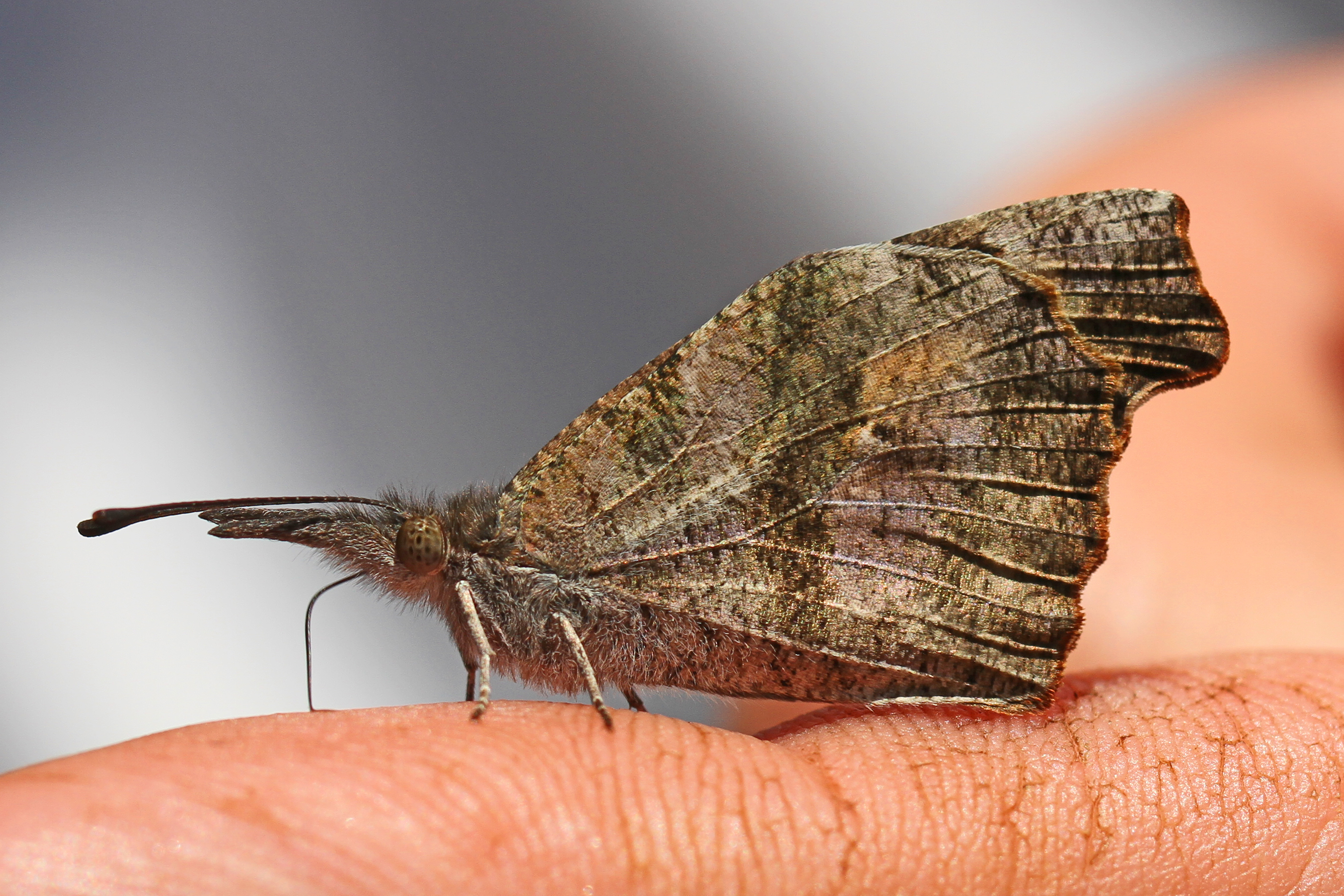
Side view

The caterpillars appear humpbacked, having a small head, swollen first and second abdominal segments, and a last abdominal segment which is tapered and rounded. They are dark green with yellow stripes along the top and sides of the body, and have two black tubercles on the top of the thorax. Their food is the common hackberry (Celtis occidentalis) tree.

== Migrations ==
This species is known to be migratory, and some years the migrations are so huge as to darken the sky in places. Migrations from South Texas northward occur at irregular intervals when southern populations explode, often affecting San Antonio, the Texas Hill Country, and Austin. Other migrations have been observed in Arizona, Kansas, and the Lake Erie Islands. Migrations occur from June through October, and are thought to be triggered by droughts followed by heavy summer rains: the droughts reduce a parasitoid that would otherwise limit butterfly populations, whereas the rains induce the spiny hackberry to grow new leaves which provide food for caterpillars. Furthermore, whereas the droughts send the butterflies into a sort of hibernation, the rains bring them out of it all at once to lay eggs, causing a population explosion. In Texas, years in which migrations were observed include 1921, 1978, 1996, 2018, 2020, and 2022.
