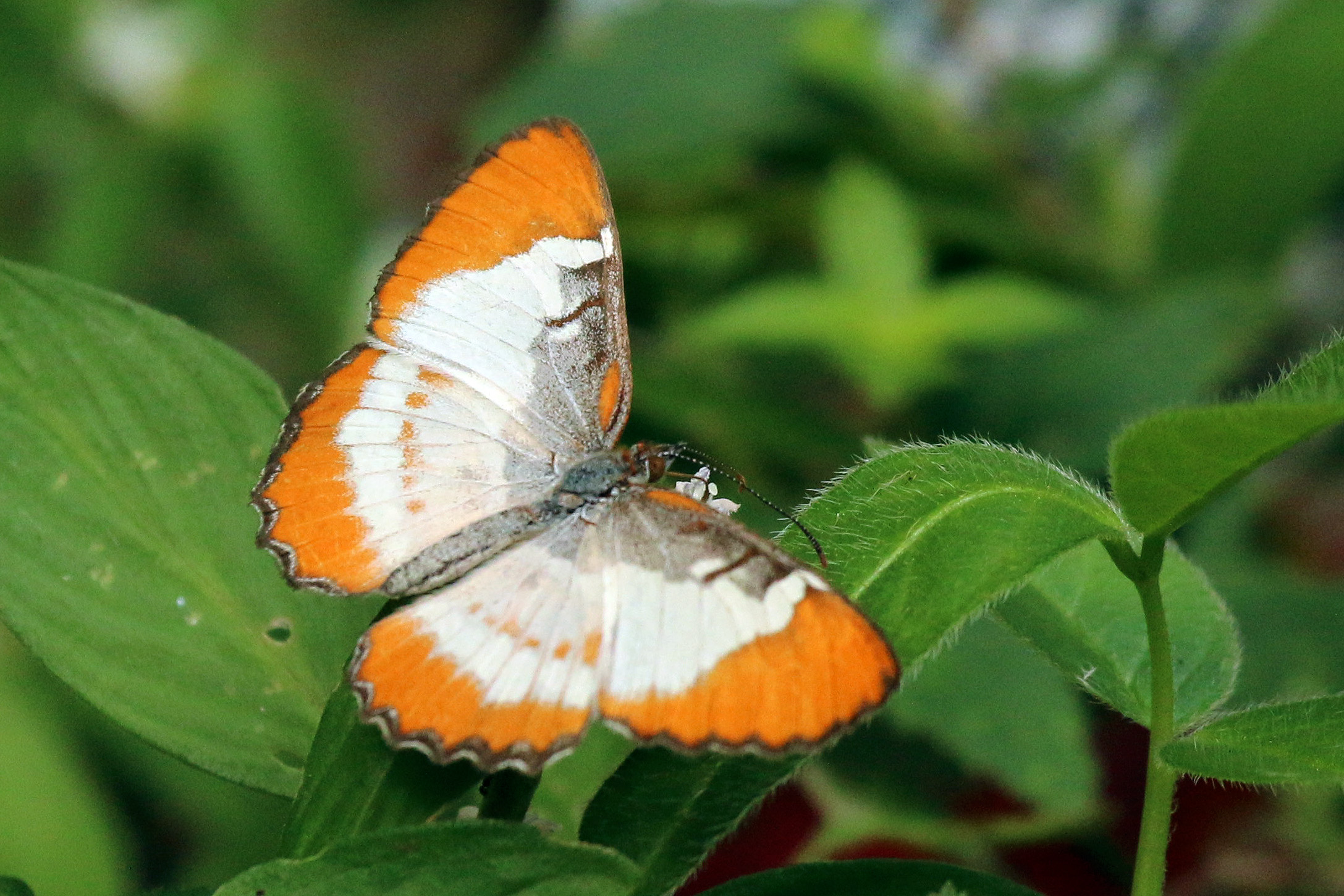
- Female M. d. dorcas, Jamaica

Scientific classification
- Kingdom: Animalia
- Phylum: Arthropoda
- Class: Insecta
- Order: Lepidoptera
- Family: Nymphalidae
- Genus: Mestra; Hübner, [1825]
- Species: M. dorcas

Binomial name
- Mestra dorcas (Fabricius, 1775)

Synonyms
- Genus synonymy; Cystineura Boisduval, [1836] Species synonymy; Papilio dorcas Fabricius, 1775; Mestra bogotana C. & R. Felder, 1867; Mestra amymone; Papilio mardania Cramer, 1779; Papilio hersilia Fabricius, 1777; Cystineura cana Erichson, [1849]; Cystineura bogotana C. & R. Felder, 1867; Cystineura floridana Strecker, 1900; Cystineura cowiana Butler, 1902; Mestra hypermestra Hübner, [1825]; Cystineura tocantina Bates, 1865; Cystineura amymone Ménétriés, 1857; Cystineura aurantia Weeks, 1902; Cystineura apicalis burchelli Moulton, 1908; Cysteneura hypermnestra sordida Hayward, 1931; Cystineura latimargo Hall, 1929

= Mestra dorcas =

Species of butterfly

Mestra is a genus of nymphalid butterfly. It contains the single species Mestra dorcas, the Jamaican mestra, which is found from southern North America to South America and possibly Mestra cana, the St Lucia mestra, found in the Lesser Antilles (though this may be a misidentification).

The wingspan is 35–50 mm. Adults are on wing year round in southern Texas, but it is most numerous from June to November. They have been recorded feeding on the nectar of Lantana flowers.

== Subspecies ==
Listed alphabetically:

- M. d. amymone (Ménétriés, 1857) (Louisiana to southern Texas and in Nicaragua, Costa Rica) – Amymone
- M. d. apicalis (Staudinger, 1886) (Bolivia, Argentina, Brazil: São Paulo, Goiás, Pará)
- M. d. dorcas Hübner, [1825] (Jamaica)
- M. d. hersilia (Fabricius, 1777) (Guyana, Colombia, St. Lucia, Trinidad)
- M. d. hypermestra Hübner, [1825] (Brazil: Pará, Paraguay)
- M. d. latimargo (Hall, 1929) (Ecuador)
- M. d. semifulva (C. & R. Felder, 1867) (Colombia)
