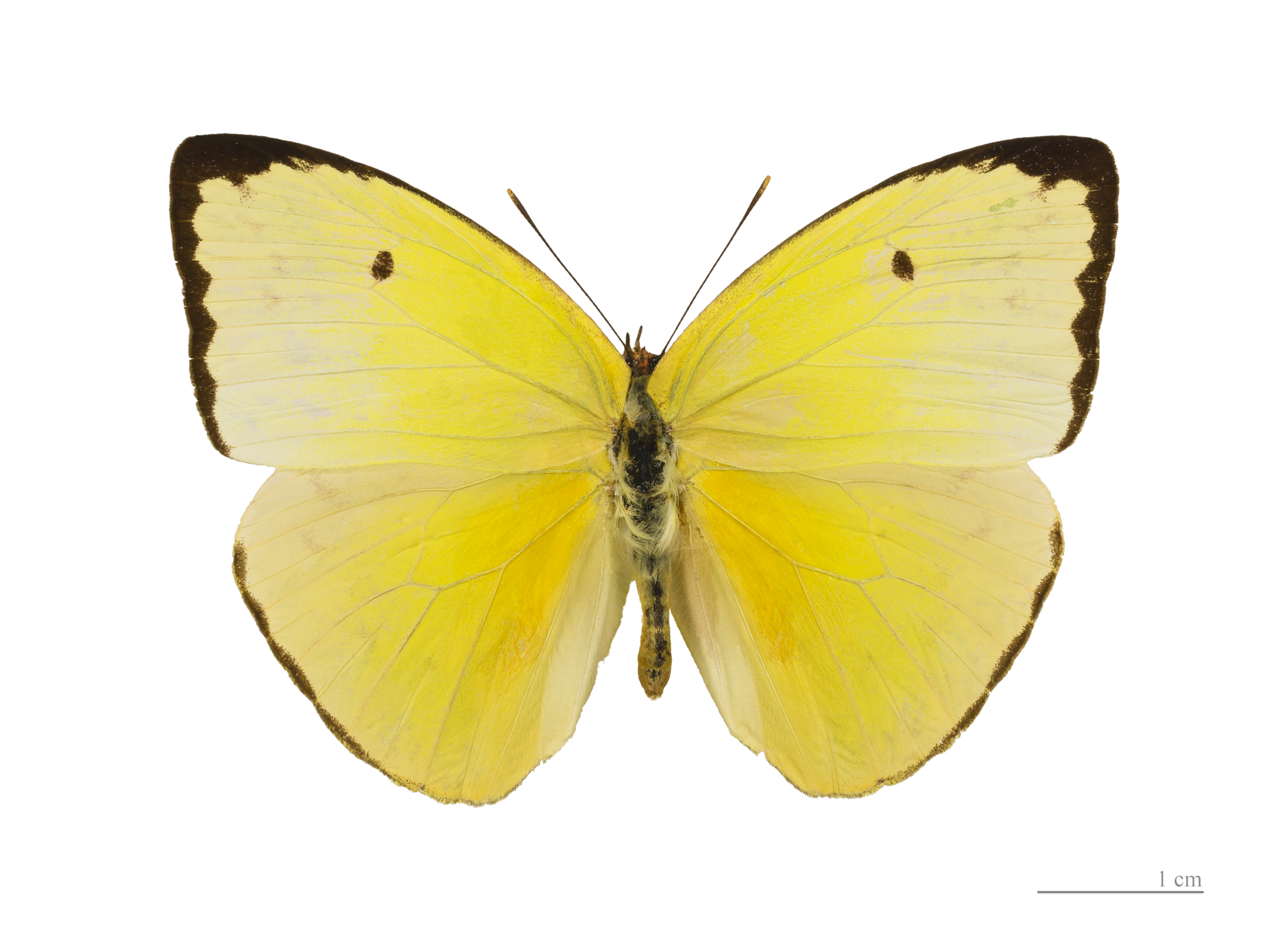
- A. s. statira - dorsal side
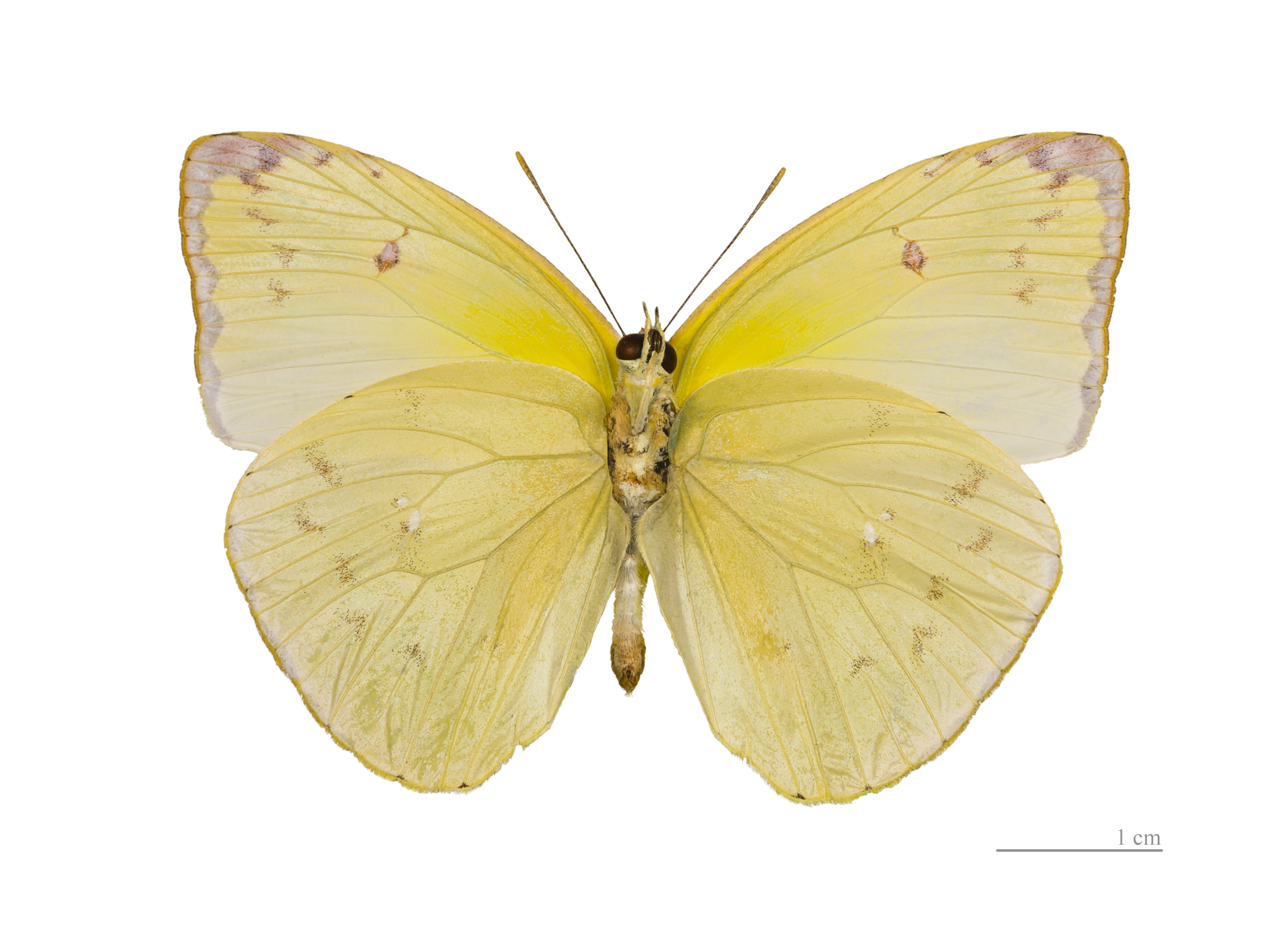
- A. s. statira - ventral side

Conservation status
- Secure (NatureServe)

Scientific classification
- Kingdom: Animalia
- Phylum: Arthropoda
- Class: Insecta
- Order: Lepidoptera
- Family: Pieridae
- Genus: Aphrissa
- Species: A. statira

Binomial name
- Aphrissa statira Cramer, 1777

Synonyms
- Phoebis statira Cramer, 1777

= Aphrissa statira =

Statira sulphur

Species of butterfly

Aphrissa statira, the statira sulphur, is a species of Lepidoptera in the family Pieridae. The species is a medium-sized yellow butterfly, with females more pale than males. They are found from southern regions of Florida and Texas through southern Brazil and northern Argentina. The caterpillars feed on the leaves of several local host plants, while adults prefer to feed on the nectar of red or orange colored flowers. The species is most noted for their dramatic migrations in the tropical areas of the Americas. They have been the subject of many studies about how butterflies navigate and orient during migration.

== Identification ==
Aphrissa statira has a wingspan of about 2.37 inches (6.0 cm) to 3.12 inches (7.9 cm). Because of their yellow color, they can be difficult to differentiate from cloudless sulphur butterflies when flying. In general, the color of their wings vary between individual butterflies, with the most variation in color seen in Colombia, Central America, and Mexico. The subspecies A. statira cubana has also been characterized in Cuba, Jamaica, and the Cayman Islands. The lustrous underside of the wings of both sexes is pale green or white with more yellow on the edge. They exhibit sexual dimorphism; males have a different color than females do in their upper wing.

=== Male ===
The upper surface of the male wing is divided by ridges of androconial scales. The outer half of wing is pale yellow and inner half is a brighter, lemon yellow.

=== Female ===
Female statira sulphur are lighter yellow to greenish-white with black borders at the apex and outer margin. Additionally, they have a solid black cell spot. Females also have pink to purple-brown spots and uneven borders along the periphery of the underside of the wing.

== Geographic range ==
The species ranges from Argentina north through Central America, extending as far as southern Texas and Florida and are also found on nearby islands. They can also be found through southern Georgia, New Mexico, and Kansas. They are especially abundant in the Amazon. Many flights occur in Florida from June through February and they make large migrations in the tropics.

== Habitat ==
Aphrissa statira are found in tropical scrubs, gardens, fields and forest edges. Males are usually found on the edges of rivers and other open spaces. Females are often found in the thinner parts of the forest and along the edges. They are often found in very high density, but can be more rare along the edges of their range. Because of their dense populations, conservation is typically not needed.

== Food resources ==
=== Caterpillars ===
In Florida, the caterpillar live and feed on coinvine (Dalbergia ecastophyllum) and powder-puff (Calliandra), both members of the pea family (Fabaceae). They can also be found on other plants, including those of the genera Cassia, Entada, and Callichamys. In Costa Rica, the caterpillars also feed on the woody vine Xylophragma seemannianum. There are two forms of larvae which are found preferentially on different plant hosts.

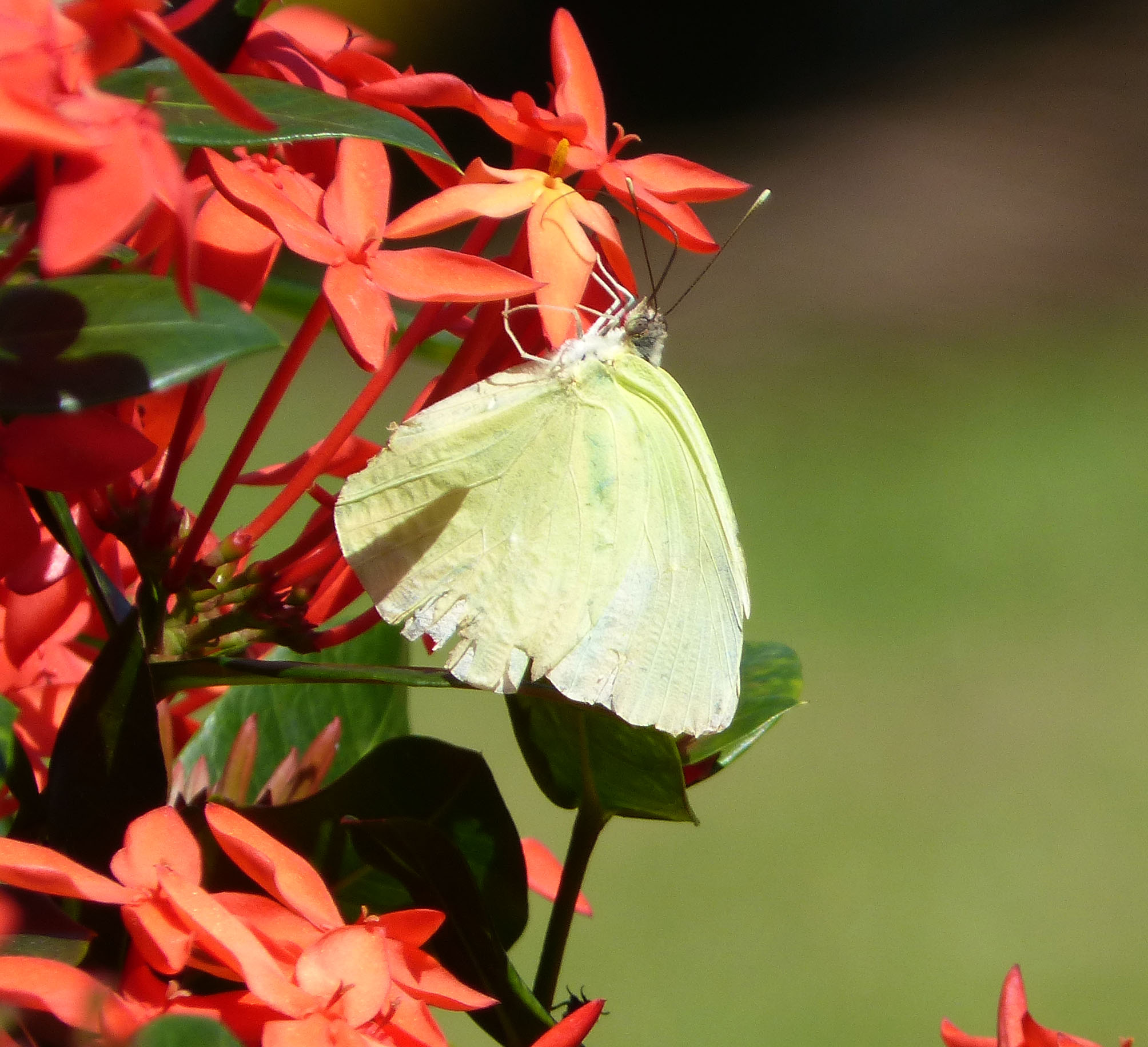
Statira sulphur demonstrate a preference for red flowering plants.

=== Adults ===
==== Adult diet ====
Adult statira sulphur feed on the nectar of flowers. They preferentially feed from red-orange colored flowers, such as the scarlet bush and lantana. Males also drink from mud puddles.

==== Pollination ====
When feeding on the nectar of red flowers, statira sulphur serve as important pollinators. For example, they help to pollinate Mandevilla tenuifolia, a pink flowering herb that is pollinated only by butterflies, mainly of the families Nymphalidae and Pieridae (the family of statira sulphur).

== Social behavior ==
=== Caterpillars ===
Caterpillars often form very large populations, which then damages their host plants. They may cluster into dense populations along with other species to take advantage of the safety that comes with large numbers. The diversity of caterpillar species in the area can help divert predators to other species. Further, the excess of caterpillars can help prevent the majority from being eaten.

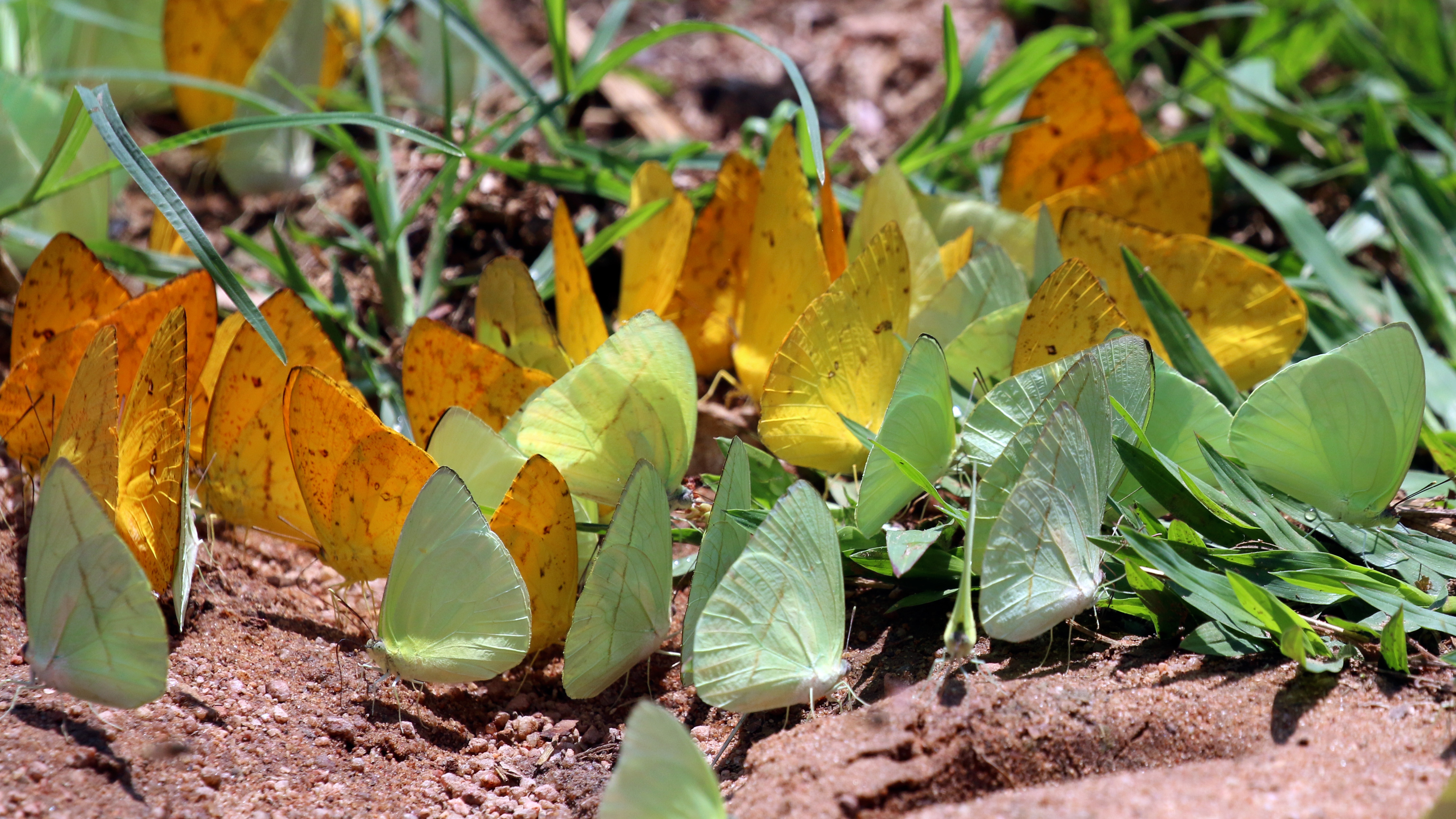
Statira sulphur form into groups, here with the straight-line sulphur (Rhabdodryas trite) and the apricot sulphur (Phoebis argante), along the Cristalino River in the Southern Amazon region of Brazil.

=== Adults ===
Male statira sulphur are often found in large groups which can be as dense as 100 butterflies within a square foot. They can be found in species-specific groups, or found intermixed with other similarly colored species, including those of genera Rhabdodryas, Phoebis, and Protesilaus.

== Life cycle ==
=== Oviposition ===
Female statira sulphur lay their eggs singly on the small, young leaves of host plants. There are usually two or three broods per year. The first is laid at the start of the rainy season, when food is most abundant and predators are the least intense. After maturation, the adult butterflies migrate to lay the second brood of the year in wetter regions.

=== Caterpillars ===
Because there are two forms of caterpillars which are found on different host plants, it is possible that there are two subspecies. The larvae which feed on Leguminosae are orange and green with a dark blue band and an orange head. The larval form which feeds on Bignoniacae is pale green with a thin yellow longitudinal stripe and a dark green head.

=== Pupa ===
When the species pupates, they form a gray to pale blue-green chrysalis. There is a thin longitudinal yellow stripe and a thin red line along the back of the chrysalis.

=== Adults ===
Adult males are most active before mid-morning, when they can be seen flying along hedges. At the hottest part of the day, they are typically found flying at the tops of trees.

== Migration ==
Statira sulphur are notable for their large annual migrations in the tropical areas of the Americas between May and July. They fly upriver in the dry season and downriver toward the ocean in the dry season. In the Amazon, as they fly north, they cross the river to settle on the moist sands of the Upper Amazon. Populations will also cross the ocean to inhabit nearby islands like the Antilles.

There are many accounts on the impressiveness of statira sulphur migration, when the butterflies can be seen flying in very large groups. Evolutionarily, migration poses an increased risk of death during the move. Thus, the benefit of moving to a new location must outweigh the risks of migration. To facilitate migration, statira sulphur have evolved several mechanisms to ensure they fly to the correct destination. Much research has been done on the statira sulphur for its ability to adjust its direction of migration under windy conditions. A study conducted in Panama demonstrated that Aphrissa statira loses its navigational capacity when exposed to a strong magnetic field, suggesting it uses the Earth's magnetic field to navigate. When experimentally exposed to strong magnetic fields, their orientation of migration was more dispersed. When experimentally exposed to a reversed magnetic field, the butterflies tended to orient themselves for migration in the opposite direction as they normally would. Together these findings demonstrate that the species uses the Earth's magnetic field to help orient their migration. This is consistent with several species of migratory birds which also use the Earth's magnetic field to differentiate the direction of the equator and the poles. Additionally, in their migration, statira sulphur are also influenced by the direction of the Sun and by the presence of landmarks.
