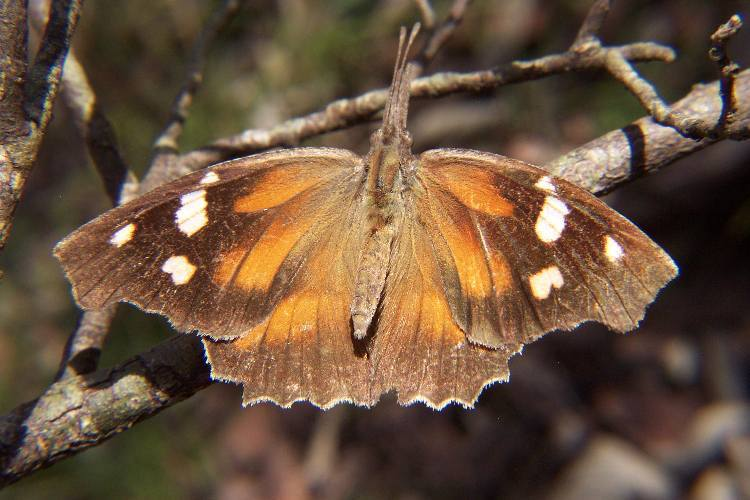
- Libytheana carinenta, American snout butterfly
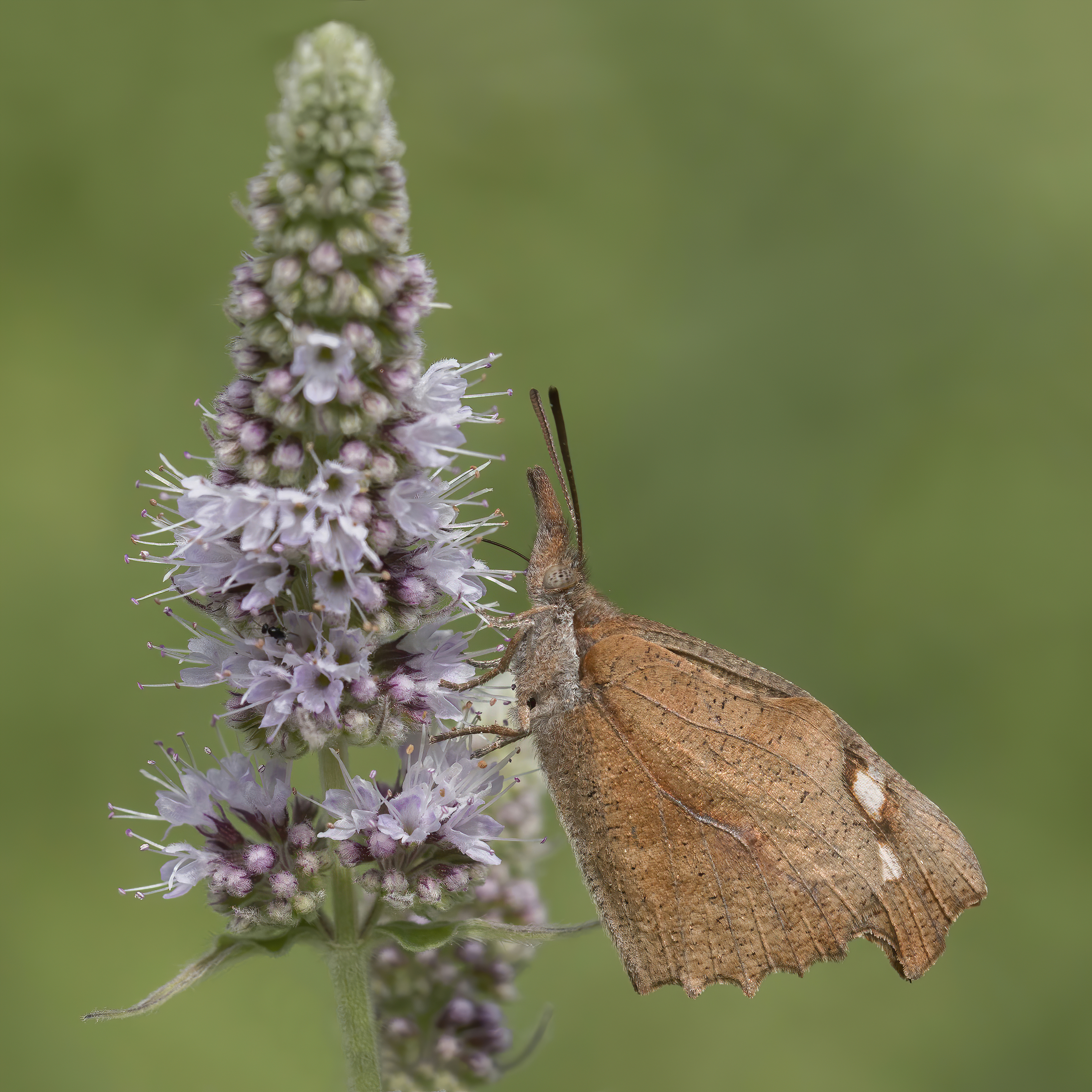
- Nettle tree (Libythea celtis), Bulgaria

Scientific classification
- Kingdom: Animalia
- Phylum: Arthropoda
- Class: Insecta
- Order: Lepidoptera
- Family: Nymphalidae
- Subfamily: Libytheinae; Boisduval, 1833

Genera
- Libythea Fabricius, 1807; Libytheana Michener, 1943

= Libytheinae =

Subfamily of butterfly family Nymphalidae

The Libytheinae are a nymphalid subfamily known as snout butterflies, containing two valid genera and about ten species: six in Libythea and four in Libytheana. The common name refers to the thick labial palps (pedipalps) that look like a "snout" in this subfamily. In older literature, this group was recognized as the family Libytheidae. They are medium-sized and typically a drab brown. The front legs are reduced in length and the ventral hindwings are cryptically colored to help them blend in with their surroundings. While at rest, the members of this subfamily keep their wings tightly closed to resemble dead leaves.

== Classification ==
Libytheinae is a subfamily of the family Nymphalidae:

- Family Nymphalidae Rafinesque, 1815
  - Subfamily Libytheinae Boisduval, 1833
    - Libythea Fabricius, 1807
    - Libytheana Michener, 1943
