= Prestonia =

Prestonia may refer to:

- Prestonia, Louisville, a place in the United States
- Prestonia, Missouri, a place in the United States
- Prestonia (plant)
- Prestonia (butterfly)
- Prestonia, the code name for Intel Xeon CPU
