= Blanco State Park =

State park in Texas, United States

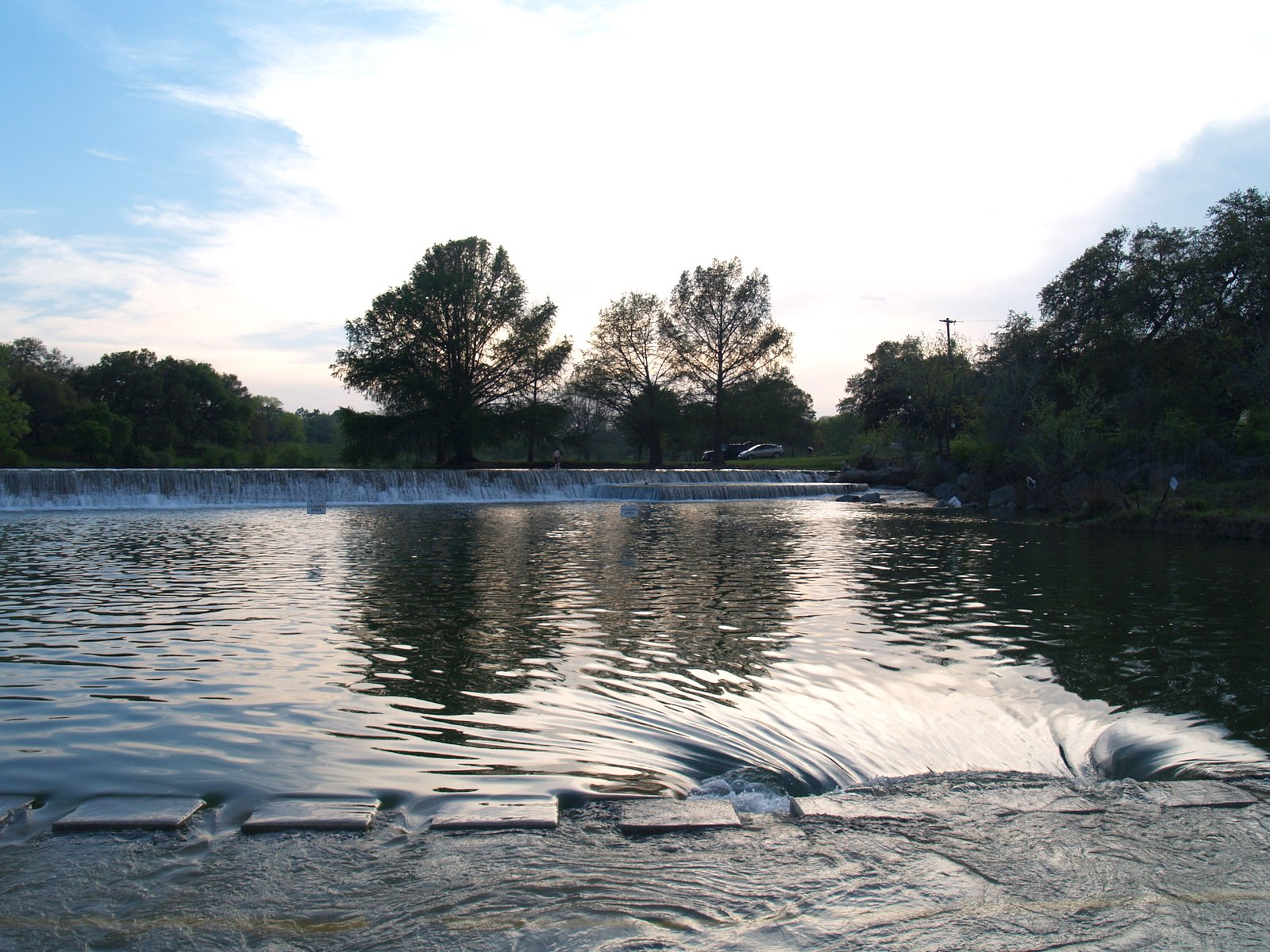
- The Blanco River in Blanco State Park

- Location within Texas Location within the United States
- Location: Blanco County, Texas, United States
- Nearest city: Blanco
- Coordinates: 30°5′22″N 98°25′26″W
- Area: 104.6 acres (42.3 ha)
- Established: 1934
- Visitors: 87,980 (in 2025)
- Governing body: Texas Parks and Wildlife Department
- Website: Official site

== History ==
Much of the early development of the park was done by the Civilian Conservation Corps company 854 between 1933 and 1934, including Park Road 23, bridges, culverts, retaining walls, dams, picnic tables, rock seats, and concession building (currently the group pavilion).

On May 23-24, 2015, the park was hit by a catastrophic flood. The Blanco River rose thirty feet. The rushing water uprooted trees and scattered branches, silt, and trash in the park. Park rangers and volunteers repaired damages. The park partially reopened on August 1, 2015, and fully reopened on October 24.

== Nature ==
=== Plants ===
The park is hilly with mostly bald cypress, American sycamore, pecan and ashe juniper trees. Seasonal wildflowers include Texas bluebonnet, Engelmann daisy, Texas paintbrush, firewheel, stiff greenthread and stemmy four-nerved daisy.

=== Animals ===
Among the animals seen at the park are white-tailed deer, raccoon, Mexican long-nosed armadillo, eastern fox squirrel and gray fox. Great blue heron, and green heron fish in the Blanco River. Red-eared slider, spiny softshell, and Texas river cooter sun on logs along the river.

== Activities ==
The park features camping, picnicking, swimming, tubing, hiking, and wildlife watching.

== See also ==
- List of Texas state parks
