= Engelmannia (disambiguation) =

The name Engelmannia has been given to two genera in biology:

- Engelmannia A. Gray ex Nutt., a daisy (Asteraceae)
- Engelmannia Klotzsch, a synonym for Croton
