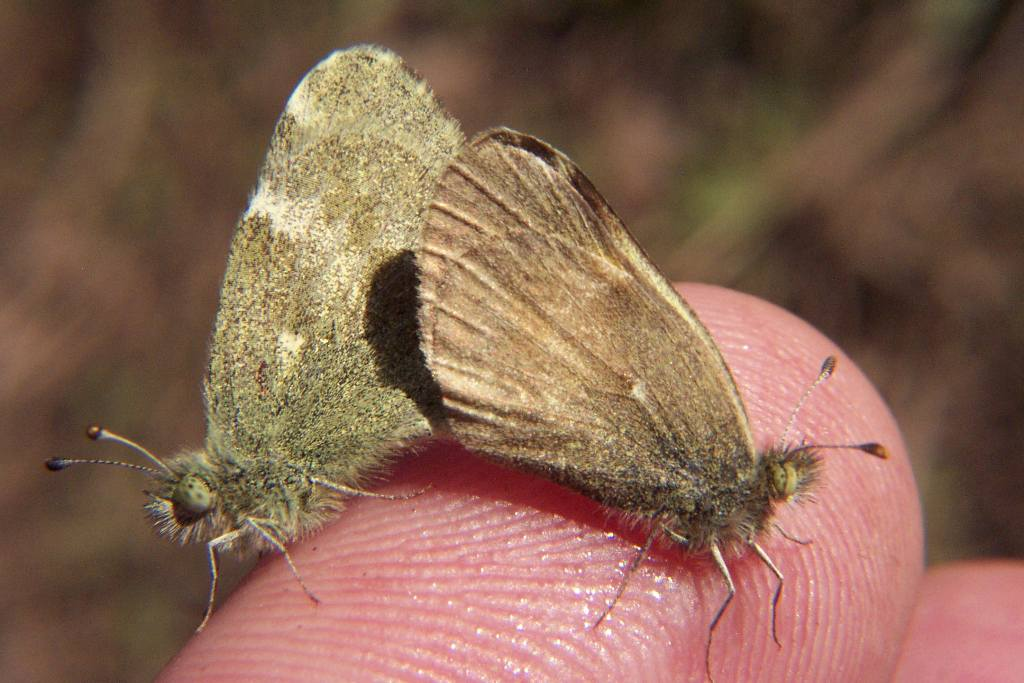
- Mating dainty sulphurs (Nathalis iole)

Scientific classification
- Kingdom: Animalia
- Phylum: Arthropoda
- Class: Insecta
- Order: Lepidoptera
- Family: Pieridae
- Subfamily: Coliadinae; Swainson, 1827

Tribes
- Coliadini; Euremini; Goniopterygini; and see text

= Coliadinae =

Subfamily of butterflies

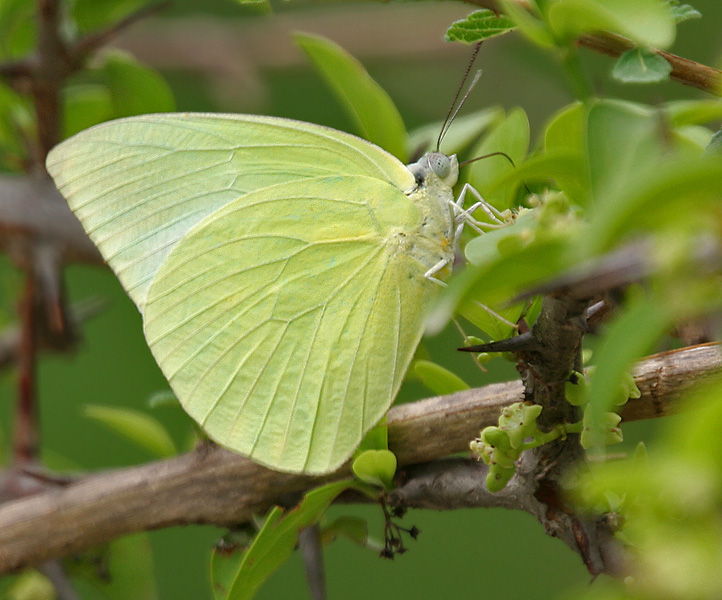
Common emigrant (Catopsilia pomona) in Keesara, Rangareddy district, Andhra Pradesh, India

Coliadinae, the sulphurs or yellows, are a subfamily of butterflies with about 300 described species.

There are 36 species in North America, where they range from Mexico to northern Canada. In most species, males are easily distinguished from females. For example, in the genera Colias and Gonepteryx), males exhibit brilliant UV reflections that the females lack.

== Systematics ==
Molecular phylogenetic analyses have found that the Coliadinae consists of two, well-supported and reciprocally monophyletic groups, which have variously been referred to as the Colias-clade and the Eurema-clade or as the tribes Euremini and Coliadini.

The genera are as follows:

Coliadini

- Gandaca Moore, [1906]
- Gonepteryx Leach, [1815] – brimstones
- Dercas Doubleday, [1847] - sulphurs
- Phoebis Hübner, [1819]
- Aphrissa Butler, 1873
- Catopsilia Hübner, [1819] – emigrants
- Anteos Hübner, [1819] – angled-sulphurs
- Zerene Hübner, [1819]
- Colias Fabricius, 1807 – clouded yellows
- Prestonia Schaus, 1920
- Rhabdodryas Godman & Salvin, [1889]

Euremini

- Kricogonia Reakirt, 1863
- Nathalis Boisduval, [1836]
- Pyrisitia Butler, 1870
- Teriocolias Roeber 1909
- Leucidia Doubleday, [1847]
- Eurema Hübner, [1819] – grass yellows
- Abaeis Hübner, [1819]
- Terias Swainson, 1821

Historically, the Coliadinae were arranged in three tribes- Euremini, Goniopterygini, and Coliadini- and a basal lineage, with one genus, Gandaca, of unclear placement.
