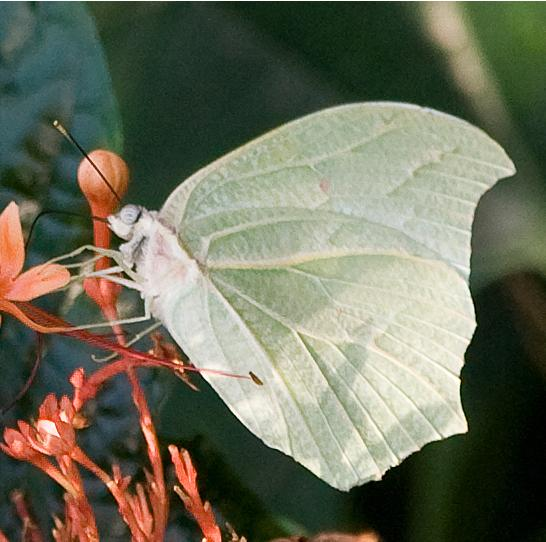
- White angled-sulphur (Anteos clorinde)

Scientific classification
- Kingdom: Animalia
- Phylum: Arthropoda
- Clade: Pancrustacea
- Class: Insecta
- Order: Lepidoptera
- Family: Pieridae
- Tribe: Coliadini
- Genus: Anteos (Hübner, 1819)

Species
- See text

Synonyms
- Amynthia Swainson, 1831; Klotsius Hemming, 1964

= Anteos =

Butterfly genus in family Pieridae

Anteos is a genus of butterflies in the family Pieridae, commonly called angled-sulphurs.

== Species ==
Listed alphabetically:

- Anteos clorinde (Godart, [1824]) – white angled sulphur or white angled-sulphur
- Anteos maerula (Fabricius, 1775) – angled sulphur or yellow angled-sulphur
- Anteos menippe (Hübner, [1818]) – orange-tipped angled-sulphur
