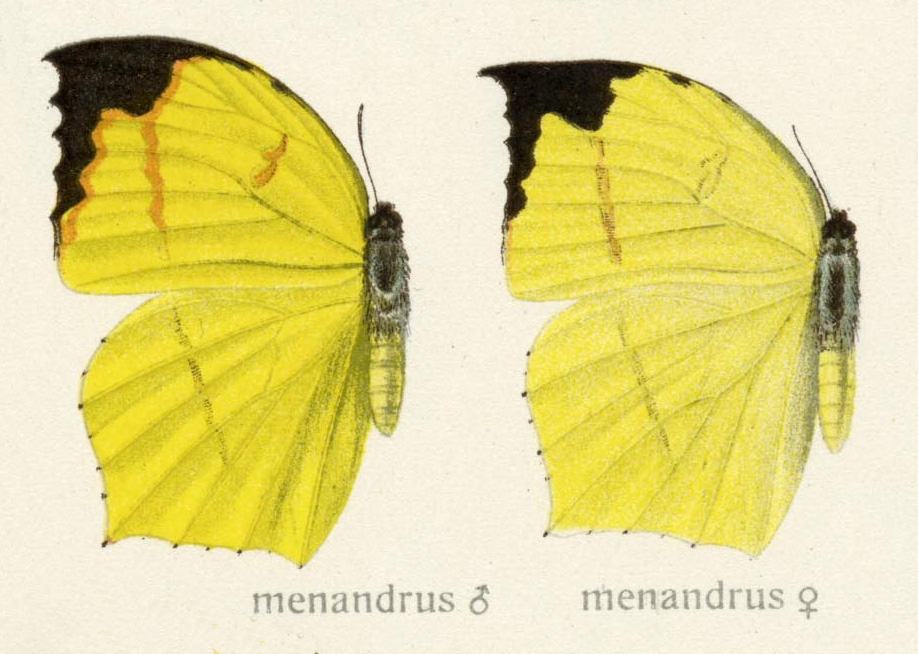
- Dercas verhuelli menandrus from Seitz

Scientific classification
- Kingdom: Animalia
- Phylum: Arthropoda
- Class: Insecta
- Order: Lepidoptera
- Family: Pieridae
- Genus: Dercas
- Species: D. verhuelli

Binomial name
- Dercas verhuelli Hoeven, 1839

= Dercas verhuelli =

Tailed sulphur

Species of butterfly

Dercas verhuelli, the tailed sulphur, is a small butterfly of the family Pieridae, that is, the yellows and whites, which is found in India, Burma, China, Peninsular Malaya and Indochina.

== See also ==
- List of butterflies of India (Pieridae)
