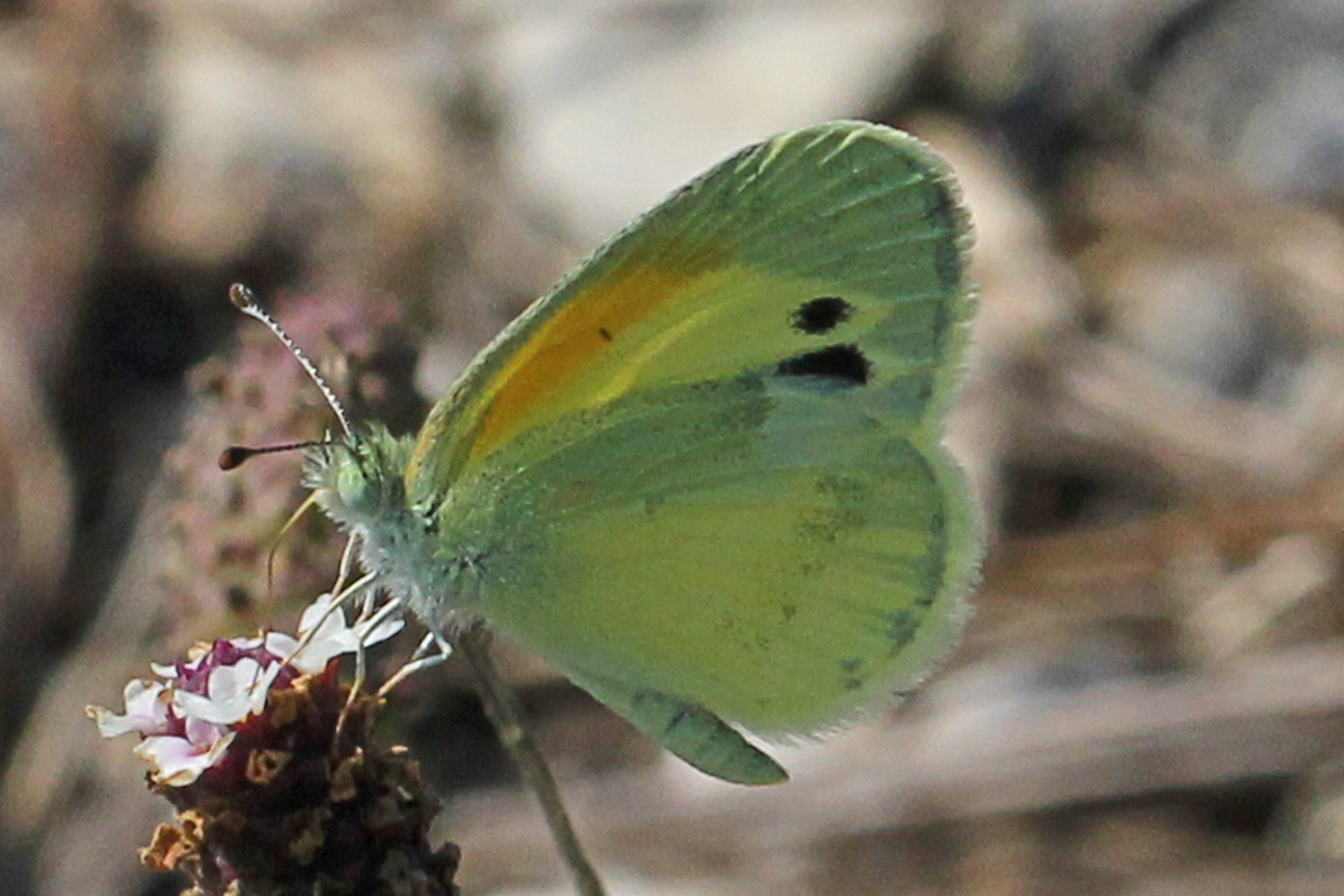
- Nathalis iole, "dainty sulphur", Florida

Scientific classification
- Kingdom: Animalia
- Phylum: Arthropoda
- Clade: Pancrustacea
- Class: Insecta
- Order: Lepidoptera
- Family: Pieridae
- Tribe: Euremini
- Genus: Nathalis; Boisduval, [1836]

= Nathalis =

Butterfly genus in family Pieridae

Nathalis is a genus of butterflies in the family Pieridae. They are found in North America, Central America, and northern South America.

== Species ==
- Nathalis iole Boisduval, 1836 – dainty sulphur or dwarf yellow
- Nathalis plauta Doubleday, 1847
