= Engelmannia pinnatifida =

Scientific classification
- Kingdom: Plantae
- Clade: Tracheophytes
- Clade: Angiosperms
- Clade: Eudicots
- Clade: Asterids
- Order: Asterales
- Family: Asteraceae
- Genus: Engelmannia
- Species: E. pinnatifida

Binomial name
- Engelmannia pinnatifida A.Gray ex Nutt.

Synonyms
- Angelandra pinnatifida (Nutt.) Endl. ex Walp.

Species of flowering plant

Engelmannia pinnatifida is a North American species of flowering plants in the family Asteraceae. It is native to the southern United States and northern Mexico, the States of Chihuahua, Coahuila, Nuevo León, Tamaulipas, Texas, New Mexico.

Engelmannia pinnatifida is a branching perennial herb up to 100 cm (40 inches) tall. Leaves at the base are bipinnatifid, while leaves on the stem are merely pinnatifid. The plant produces many small flower heads, generally with 8 ray florets and 40-50 disc florets. Flower petals are yellow in color. It grows in open, calcareous fields and roadsides.
