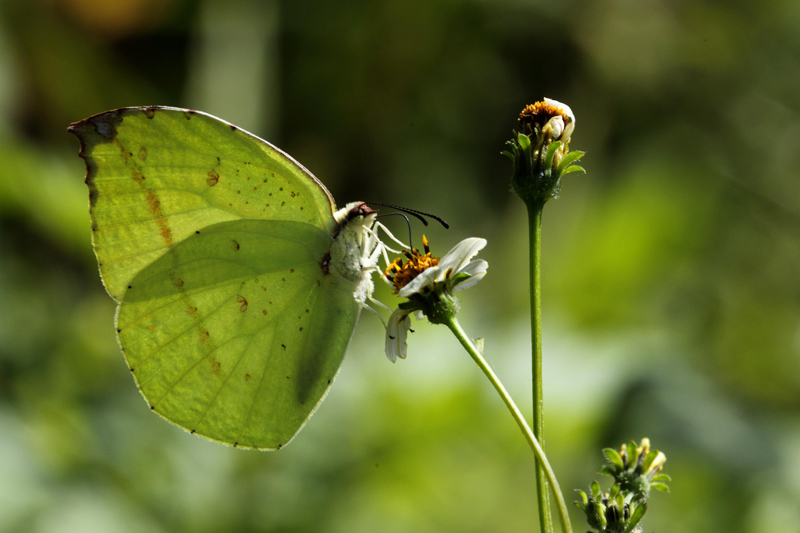

Scientific classification
- Kingdom: Animalia
- Phylum: Arthropoda
- Clade: Pancrustacea
- Class: Insecta
- Order: Lepidoptera
- Family: Pieridae
- Genus: Dercas
- Species: D. lycorias

Binomial name
- Dercas lycorias Doubleday 1842

= Dercas lycorias =

Plain sulphur

Species of butterfly

Dercas lycorias, the plain sulphur, is a small butterfly of the family Pieridae (colloquially the "yellows and whites"), which is found in India.

== See also ==
- List of butterflies of India (Pieridae)
