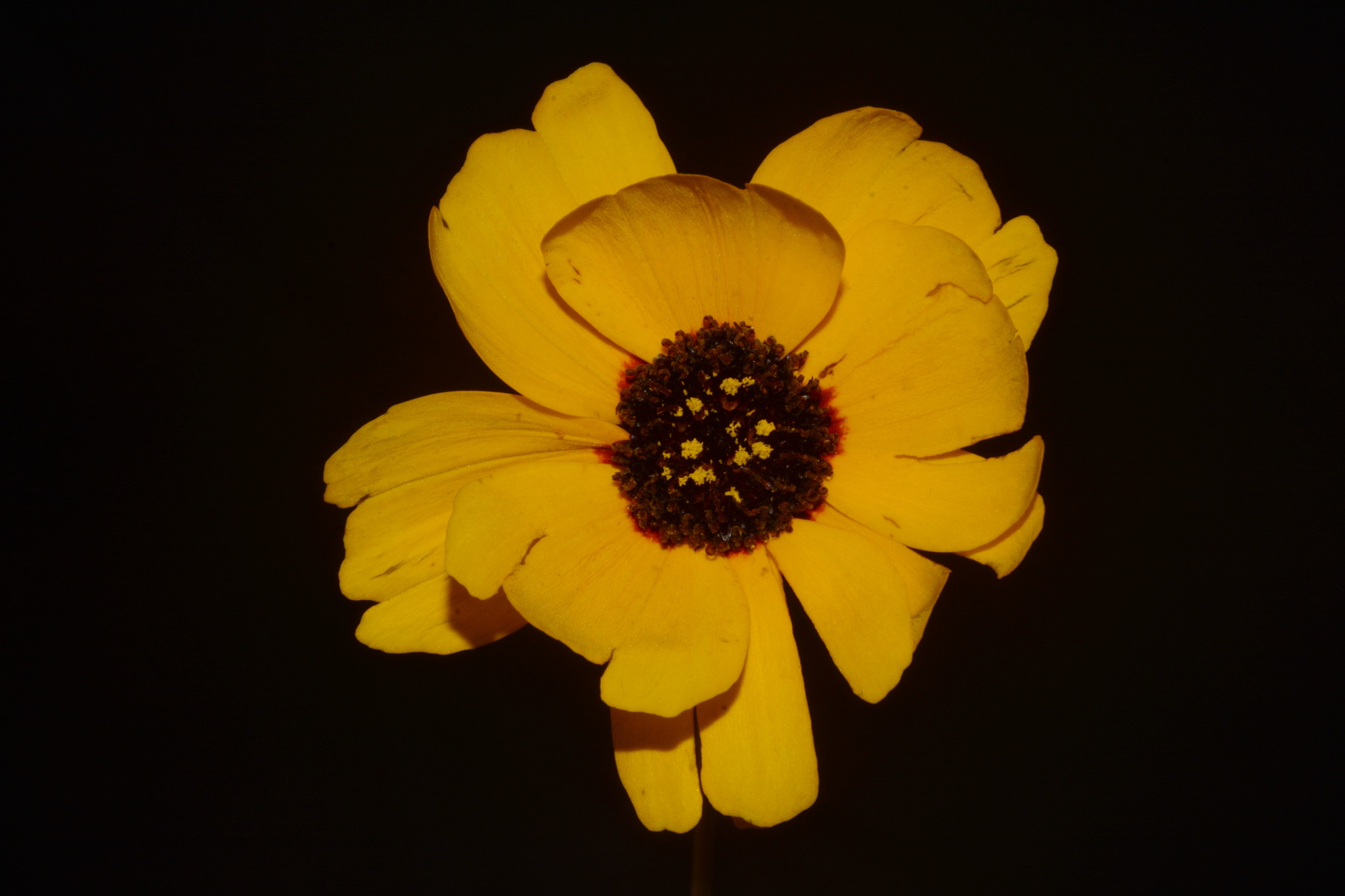

Conservation status
- Apparently Secure (NatureServe)

Scientific classification
- Kingdom: Plantae
- Clade: Tracheophytes
- Clade: Angiosperms
- Clade: Eudicots
- Clade: Asterids
- Order: Asterales
- Family: Asteraceae
- Genus: Thelesperma
- Species: T. nuecense

Binomial name
- Thelesperma nuecense B.L.Turner

= Thelesperma nuecense =

Species of flowering plant

Thelesperma nuecense, the Rio Grande greenthread, is a herbaceous annual flowering plant in the aster family. It is endemic to Texas.

== Description ==
Thelesperma nuecense is an annual herb that grows up to 3 feet tall. The cauline leaves are "scattered over proximal 1/4–1/2(–3/4) of plant heights". It flowers from March to July. There are 8 ray florets per flower head; the laminae are yellow, suffused with a red-brown spot or band. The disc corollas are red-brown, with throats usually shorter than the lobes. The cypselae are 5 to 5.5 mm long; the pappi are 0.5 to 1 mm long.

The species typically flowers from March to July.

== Distribution and habitat ==
Thelesperma nuecense is endemic to Texas, and grows at elevations of 0 to 200 meters from sea level on "disturbed sites on sands".

== Conservation ==
As of December 2024, the conservation group NatureServe listed Thelesperma nuecense as Apparently Secure (G4) worldwide. This status was last reviewed on 1 February 1994.

== Taxonomy ==
Thelesperma nuecense was first named and described by Billie Lee Turner in 1959 in the journal Rhodora. The species has no registered synonyms in the Plants of the World Online, World Flora Online, and Tropicos databases.
