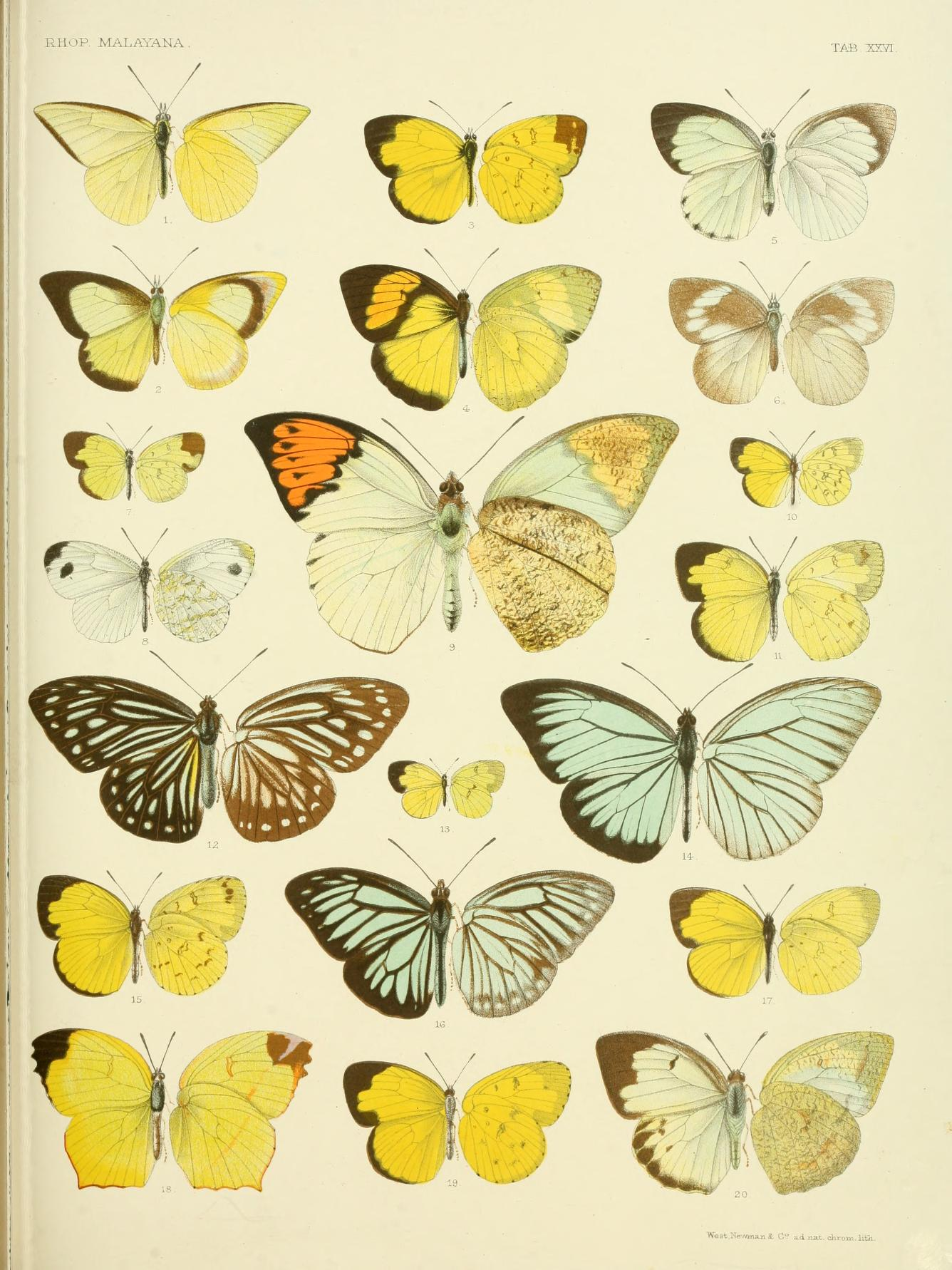
- In Rhopalocera Malayana

Scientific classification
- Kingdom: Animalia
- Phylum: Arthropoda
- Clade: Pancrustacea
- Class: Insecta
- Order: Lepidoptera
- Family: Pieridae
- Genus: Dercas
- Species: D. gobrias

Binomial name
- Dercas gobrias (Hewitson, 1864)

Synonyms
- Gonepteryx gobrias Hewitson, 1864

= Dercas gobrias =

Species of butterfly

Dercas gobrias is a butterfly in the family Pieridae. It was described by William Chapman Hewitson in 1864. It is found in the Indomalayan realm.

== Subspecies ==
- Dercas gobrias gobrias (Borneo)
- Dercas gobrias herodorus Fruhstorfer, 1910 (Peninsular Malaysia, Singapore, Sumatra)
