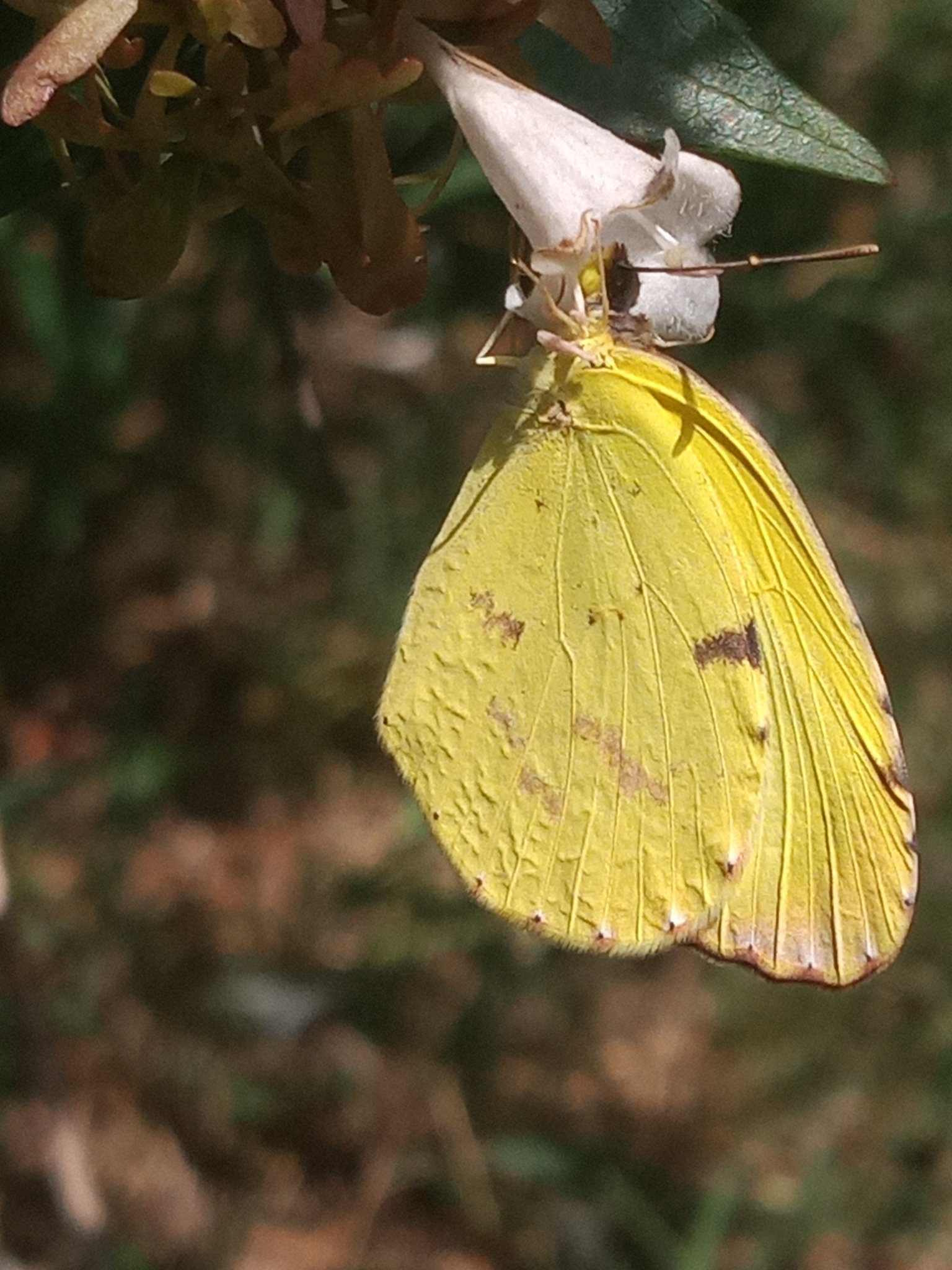
- Teriocolias deva, "Deva Yellow", Argentina

Scientific classification
- Kingdom: Animalia
- Phylum: Arthropoda
- Class: Insecta
- Order: Lepidoptera
- Family: Pieridae
- Subfamily: Coliadinae
- Tribe: Euremini
- Genus: Teriocolias; Röber, 1909

= Teriocolias =

Genus of butterflies

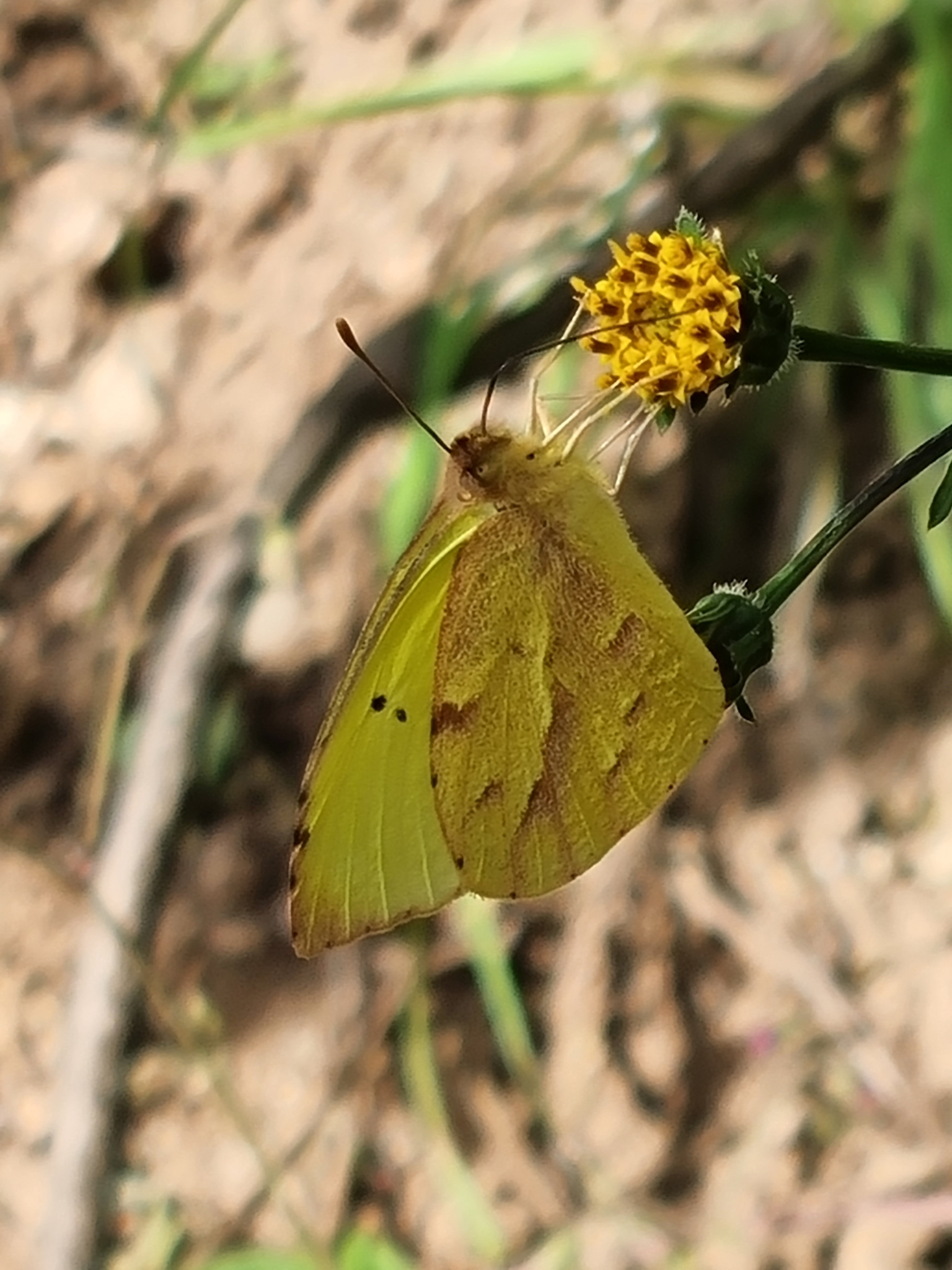
Teriocolias zelia, Argentina

Teriocolias is a genus of butterflies in the sulphurs and yellows family Pieridae. There are at least four described species in Teriocolias, found in South America.

== Species ==
These four species belong to the genus Teriocolias:

- Teriocolias deva (Doubleday, 1847) (deva yellow)
- Teriocolias doris (Röber, 1909)
- Teriocolias reticulata (Butler, 1871)
- Teriocolias zelia (Lucas, 1852)
