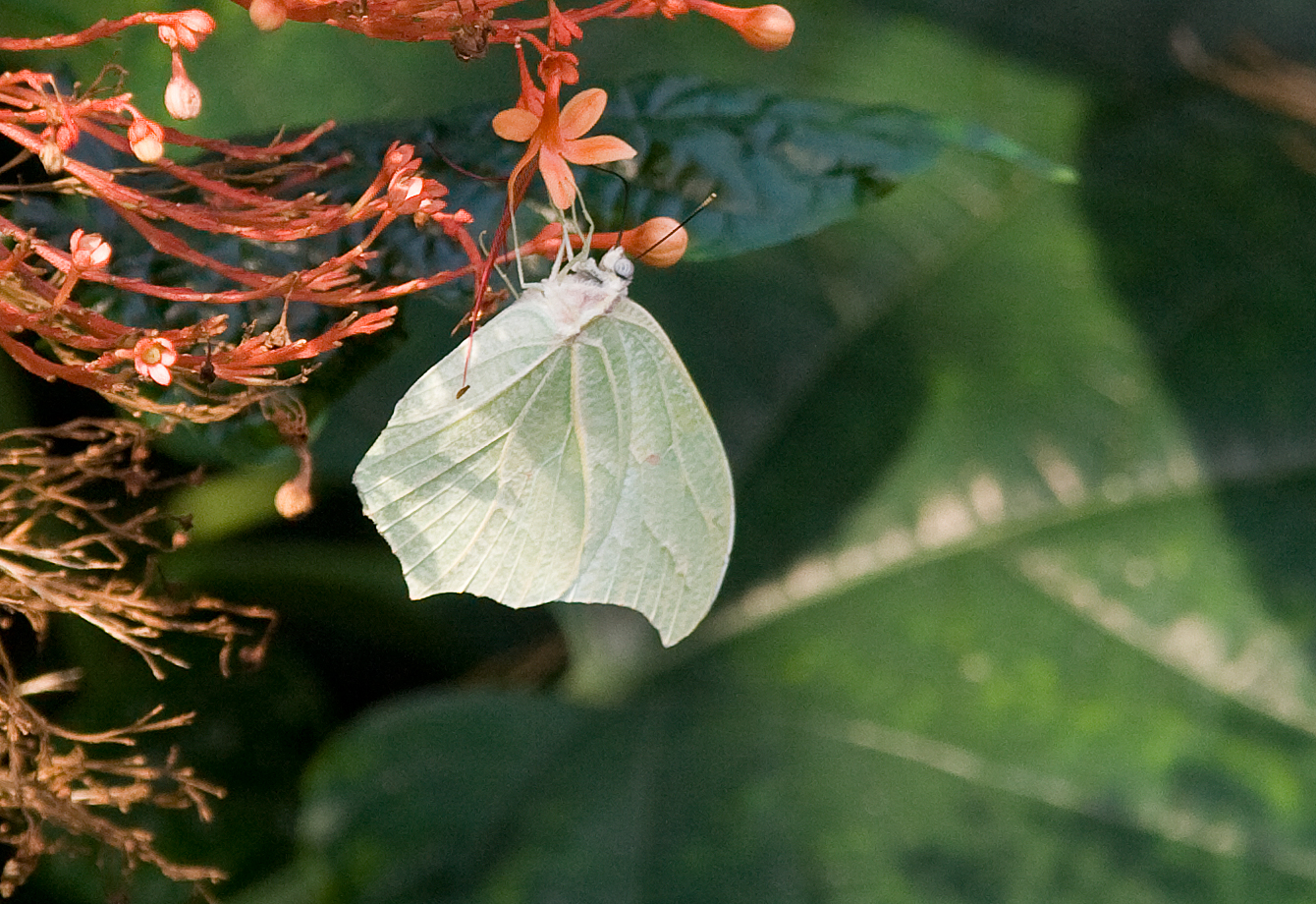

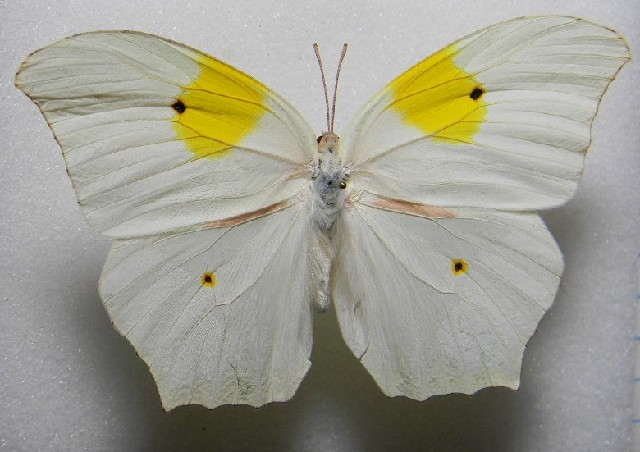

Conservation status
- Secure (NatureServe)

Scientific classification
- Kingdom: Animalia
- Phylum: Arthropoda
- Clade: Pancrustacea
- Class: Insecta
- Order: Lepidoptera
- Family: Pieridae
- Genus: Anteos
- Species: A. clorinde

Binomial name
- Anteos clorinde (Godart, [1824])

= Anteos clorinde =

Species of butterfly

Anteos clorinde, the white angled-sulphur or the ghost brimstone, is a butterfly of the family Pieridae. The species was originally described by Jean-Baptiste Godart in 1824.

== Range ==
It is found in South America, Central America, and southern North America.

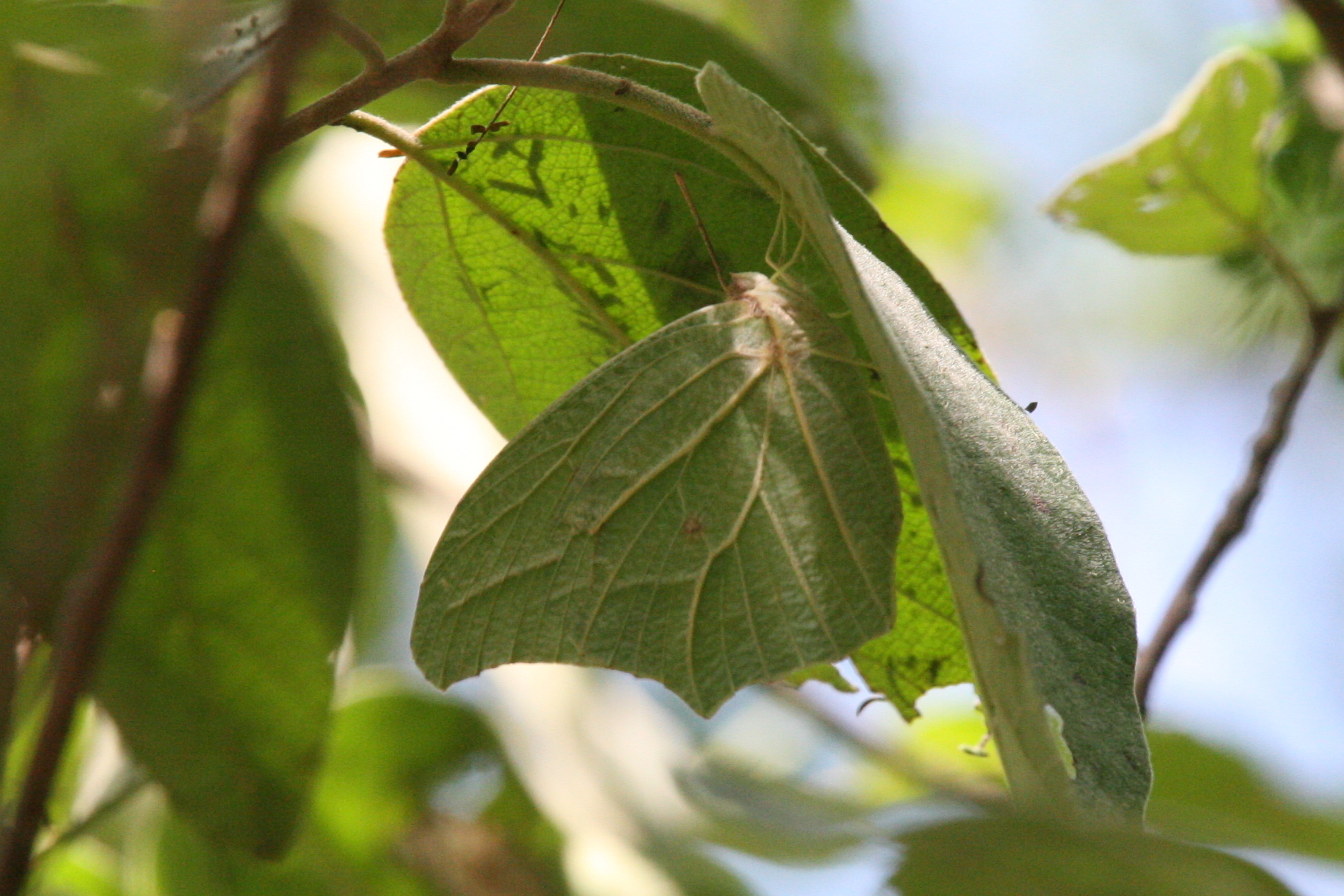

The wingspan is 70–90 mm. The butterfly flies year round in the tropical parts of its range and from August to December in the north.

The larvae feed on Senna spectabilis.

== Subspecies ==
The following subspecies are recognised:

- Anteos clorinde clorinde (Godart, 1824)
- Anteos clorinde nivifera (Frushstorfer, 1908) in Mexico
