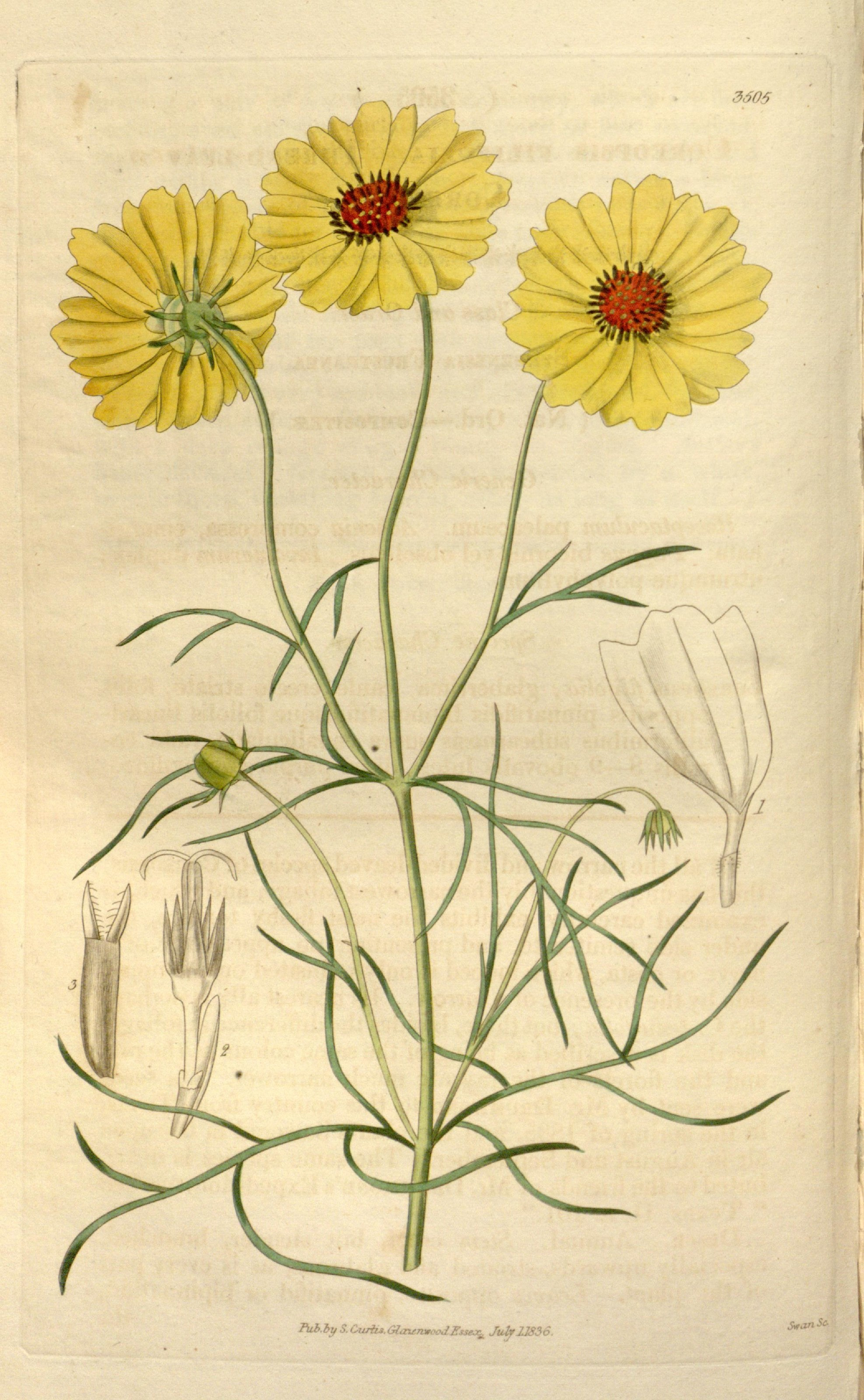

Conservation status
- Apparently Secure (NatureServe)

Scientific classification
- Kingdom: Plantae
- Clade: Tracheophytes
- Clade: Angiosperms
- Clade: Eudicots
- Clade: Asterids
- Order: Asterales
- Family: Asteraceae
- Genus: Thelesperma
- Species: T. filifolium

Binomial name
- Thelesperma filifolium (Hook.) A.Gray

Synonyms
- Coreopsis filifolia Hook.; Coreopsis trifida Poir.; Cosmidium burridgeanum Regel; Cosmidium filifolium (Hook.) Nutt.; Thelesperma filifolium var. filifolium (Hook.) A.Gray; Thelesperma filifolium var. intermedium (Rydb.) Shinners; Thelesperma intermedium Rydb.; Thelesperma intermedium var. intermedium; Thelesperma trifidum Britton

= Thelesperma filifolium =

Species of flowering plant

Thelesperma filifolium, commonly known as stiff greenthread, or plains greenthread, is a species of flowering plant in the aster family, Asteraceae. It is often found growing in shallow soils. It prefers disturbed sites in dry, sandy or gravelly soil with a neutral to basic pH. Stiff greenthread adapts to various soil conditions, including loam, clay, caliche, and roadsides. It generally flowers from March to August, sometimes into October.

== Distribution ==
In Texas, stiff greenthread can be found growing along roadsides and on dry hills in the South Plains and Edwards Plateau regions. The herb grows over much of the plains and mountain states, reaching up to Wyoming, Montana, Nebraska and South Dakota. It grows prolifically on the Navajo, Hopi, and Pueblo lands, as well as throughout much of New Mexico, Arizona and Colorado.

Stiff greenthread is found on disturbed sites on clays or sandy soils, on rocky slopes, and often on limestone, at elevations from 10 to 2200 meters, in South Dakota, Wyoming, Nebraska, Colorado, Kansas, Missouri, New Mexico, Oklahoma, Arkansas, Texas, Louisiana, Mississippi, Coahuila, Nuevo León, San Luis Potosí, and Querétaro.

== Description ==
Having a taproot, it is extremely resistant to drought, but thrives in rain. The designation greenthread is most appropriate, as it has thin, thread-like leaves. It can be single-stemmed or multi-stemmed, and reaches a height of 12 to 26 inches. The leaves are scattered along the whole stem. The daisy-like, 2 inch, eight-ray flowers are golden-yellow and the numerous disk flowers are reddish to dark brown. The urn-shaped bloom buds droop downward prior to opening. The inner whorl of phyllaries surrounding the lower portion of the bloom is translucent, which allows the colors of the developing flowers to be seen. When open, there are two types of phyllary at the base of the bloom: one is short and green, the other red and long.

== Ecology ==
The ripened seeds are a food source for the multi-colored painted bunting. It does not appear to be eaten by deer. It is a larval host for the dwarf yellow butterfly.

== Uses ==
The crushed leaves offer a pleasant aroma and can be made into tea, which is sometimes used medicinally by several Native American tribes. This is especially widespread among southwest tribes, where it is named Navajo tea, Hopi tea, or Indian tea.

Stiff greenthread has traditionally been used by Diné (Navajo) and Ndé (Apache) as a tea. For the tea, the stem, leaves, and flowers were steeped, to be used as an astringent, to reduce mucus secretions, to reduce fevers, to treat kidney problems, as a vermifuge, to relieve stomach aches and other digestive ailments, and against sexually transmitted infections. The leaves were chewed to relieve toothache.
