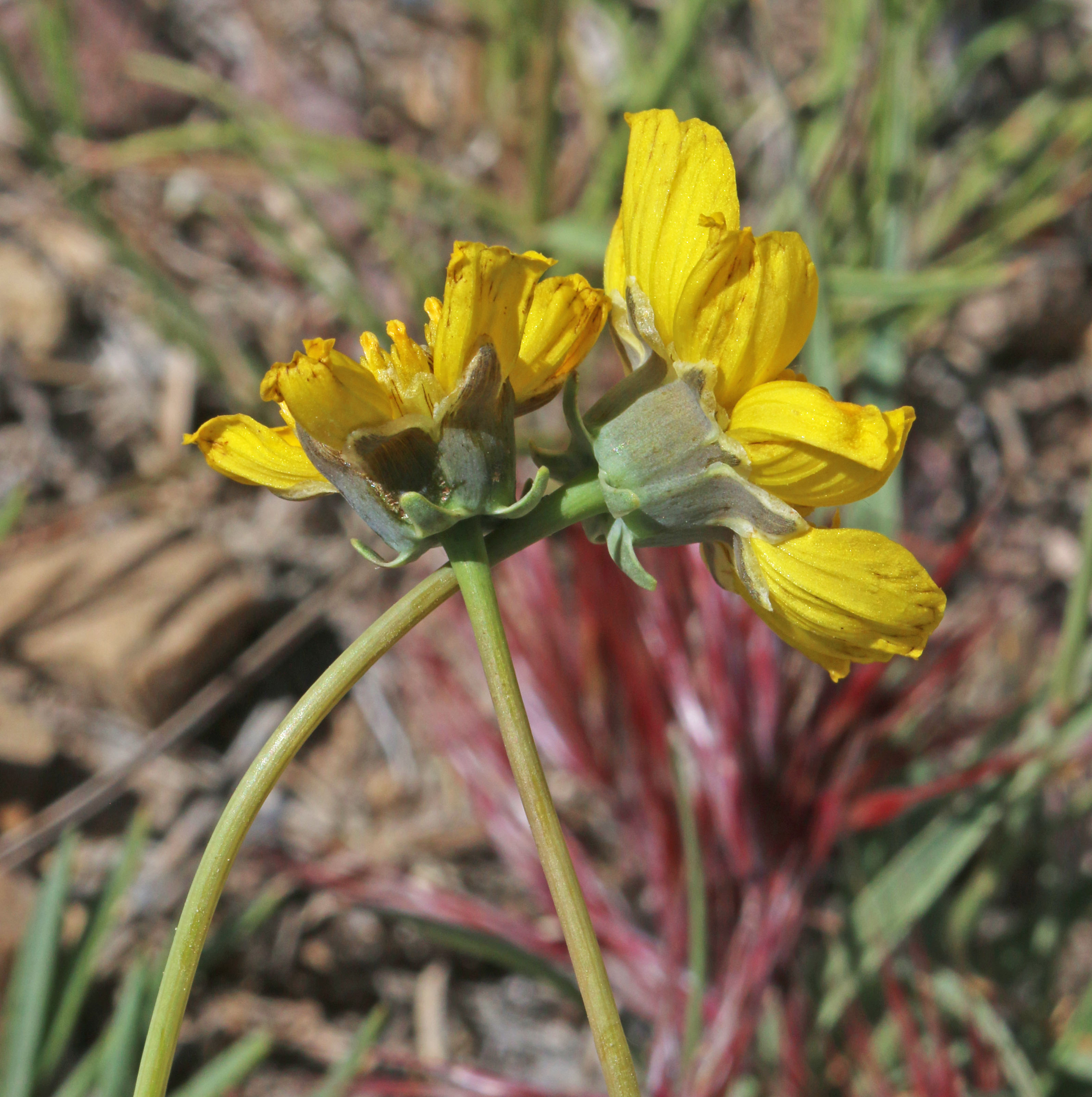

Conservation status
- Secure (NatureServe)

Scientific classification
- Kingdom: Plantae
- Clade: Tracheophytes
- Clade: Angiosperms
- Clade: Eudicots
- Clade: Asterids
- Order: Asterales
- Family: Asteraceae
- Genus: Thelesperma
- Species: T. subnudum

Binomial name
- Thelesperma subnudum A.Gray

Synonyms
- Thelesperma pubescens Dorn

= Thelesperma subnudum =

Species of flowering plant

Thelesperma subnudum, commonly known as Navajo tea, is a perennial species of flowering plant in the family Asteraceae. It is found from west central Canada to central United States. It grows in openings in pinyon/juniper or yellow pine forests.

== Description ==
Thelesperma subnudum is a perennial herb that typically grows between 10 and 40 cm (3.9 and 15.7 in) tall. The cauline leaves are "mostly crowded over proximal 1/4(–1/2) of plant heights". The calyculi are "of 7–9 deltate to lance-linear bractlets 2–4+ mm". There are 0 or 8 ray florets per flower head. The ray laminae are yellow, typically 12 to 20 mm (0.47 to 0.79 in) long. The disc corollas are yellow, sometimes with red-brown nerves. The cypselae are 5 to 7 mm (0.20 to 0.28 in) long.

It typically blooms from May to September.

== Distribution and habitat ==
It is native to Alberta, Arizona, Colorado, Montana, Nevada, New Mexico, North Dakota, Utah, and Wyoming.

=== Habitat ===
It grows at elevations of 1000–2900 meters from sea level in openings in pinyon/juniper or yellow pine forests.

=== Uses ===
The Navajo have used the flower to produce a yellow to orange dye solution for dyeing woolen yarns.

== Taxonomy ==
=== Varieties ===
As of July 2023, Plants of the World Online has 2 varieties listed for this taxon:

- Thelesperma subnudum var. subnudum – west central Canada to central United States
- Thelesperma subnudum var. maliterrimum S.L.Welsh & N.D.Atwood – Utah
