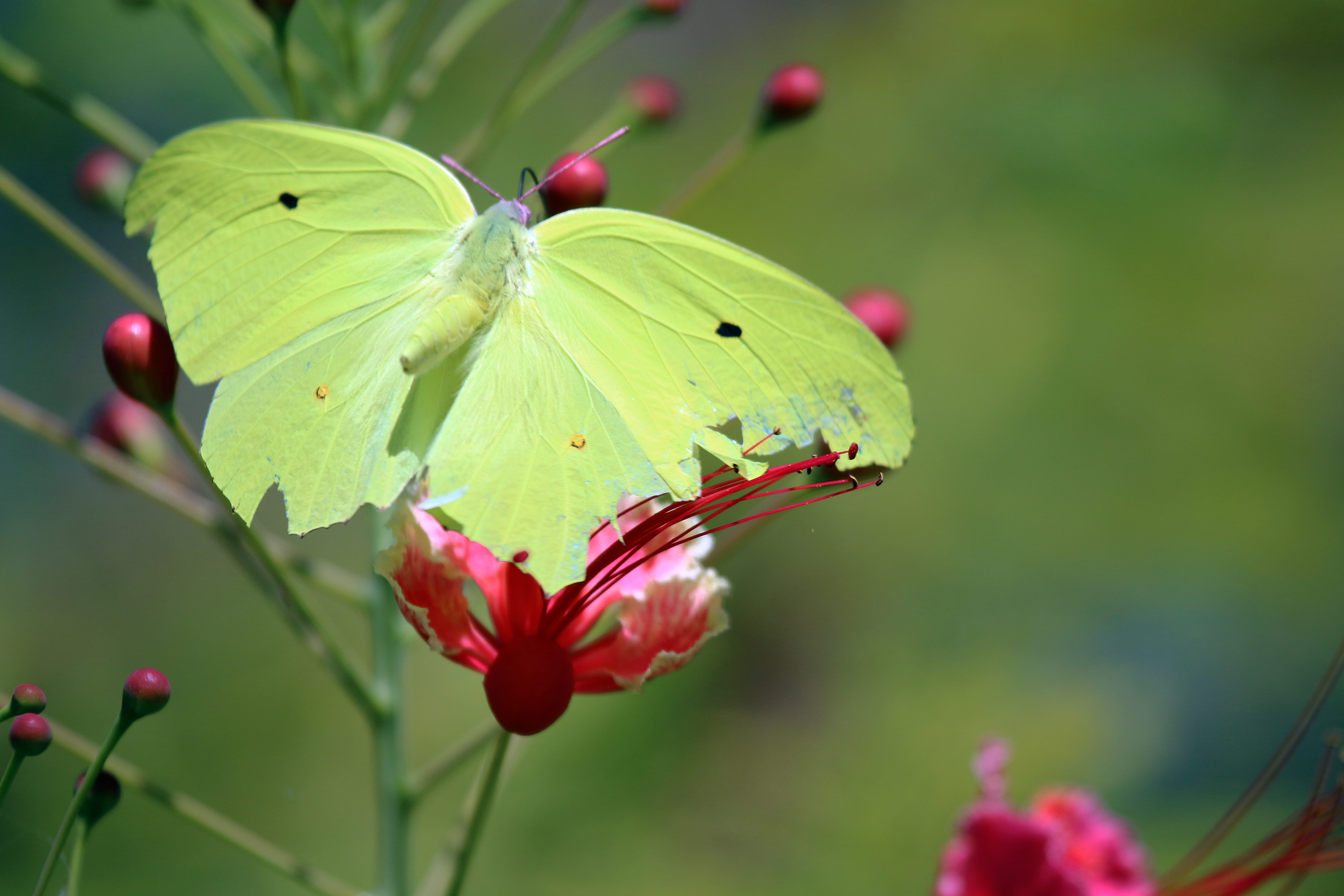
- male A. m. maerula in Jamaica (dorsal)
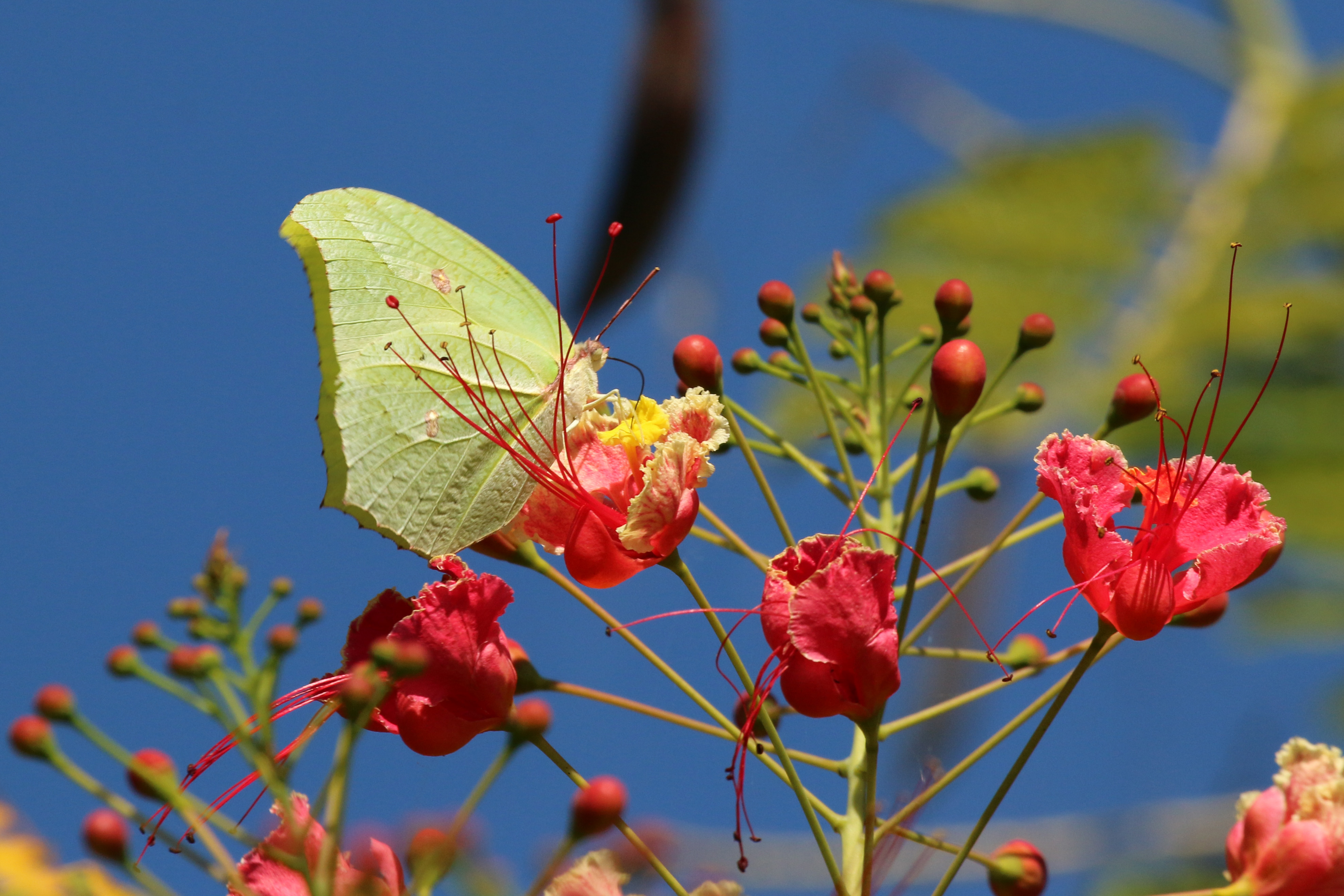
- male A. m. maerula in Jamaica (ventral)

Scientific classification
- Kingdom: Animalia
- Phylum: Arthropoda
- Class: Insecta
- Order: Lepidoptera
- Family: Pieridae
- Genus: Anteos
- Species: A. maerula

Binomial name
- Anteos maerula (Fabricius, 1775)

Synonyms
- Papilio maerula Fabricius, 1775; Rhodocera maerula; Amynthia maerula; Papilio ecclipsis Cramer, [1777]; Rhodocera lacordairei Boisduval, 1836; Rhodocera gueneeana Boisduval, 1836; Gonepteryx maerula ab. flava Röber, 1909; Anteos maerula lacordairei

= Anteos maerula =

Yellow angled-sulphur

Species of butterfly

Anteos maerula, the angled sulphur or yellow angled-sulphur, is a butterfly of the family Pieridae. It is found from Peru to Mexico. Rarely, migrants can be found up to eastern Nebraska, south-eastern Arizona, south-western New Mexico, southern Texas, Mississippi and Florida.

The wingspan is 82–117 mm.

The larvae feed on Cassia species, including Cassia emarginata.
