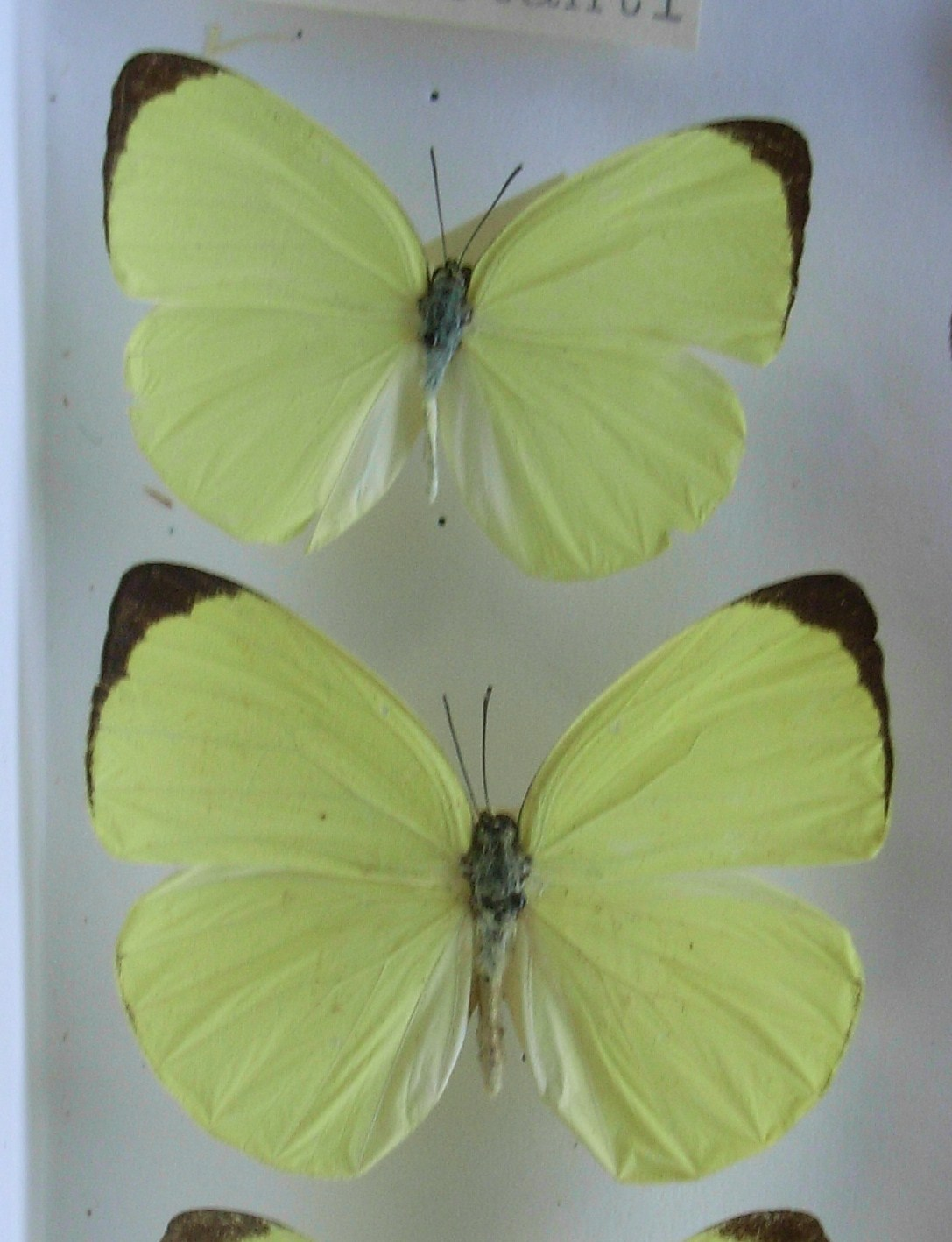
- Gandaca harina

Scientific classification
- Kingdom: Animalia
- Phylum: Arthropoda
- Clade: Pancrustacea
- Class: Insecta
- Order: Lepidoptera
- Family: Pieridae
- Subfamily: Coliadinae
- Genus: Gandaca; Moore, [1906]

Species
- See text.

= Gandaca =

Butterfly genus in family Pieridae

Gandaca is a genus of butterflies in the family Pieridae.

== Species ==
- Gandaca butyrosa (Butler, 1875)
- Gandaca harina (Horsfield, 1829)
