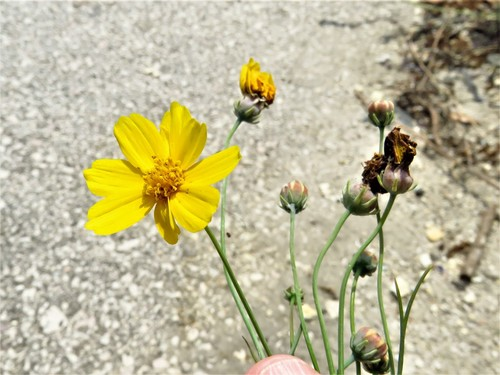

Conservation status
- Apparently Secure (NatureServe)

Scientific classification
- Kingdom: Plantae
- Clade: Tracheophytes
- Clade: Angiosperms
- Clade: Eudicots
- Clade: Asterids
- Order: Asterales
- Family: Asteraceae
- Genus: Thelesperma
- Species: T. simplicifolium

Binomial name
- Thelesperma simplicifolium (A.Gray) A.Gray

Varieties
- T. simplicifolium var. simplicifolium; T. simplicifolium var. macrocarpum Melchert.

Synonyms
- Cosmidium simplicifolium A.Gray

= Thelesperma simplicifolium =

Species of flowering plant

Thelesperma simplicifolium, commonly known as the slender greenthread, is a perennial, herbaceous, flowering plant in the Asteraceae family. It is found from Texas and Mexico in openings in oak or juniper woodlands or on desert scrub.

== Description ==
Thelesperma simplicifolium is a perennial, herbaceous, flowering plant. It typically grows 20 to 70 cm (7.9 to 27.6 in) tall. The cauline leaves are "scattered over proximal 3/4+ of plant heights". The leaf internodes are 45 to 95 mm in length. The leaf lobes are mostly linear to filiform (thread-like) and are 5 to 60 mm long by 0.5 to 2 mm wide.

There are usually eight ray florets per flower head, each with yellow laminae that are 9 to 20 mm in length. The species usually flowers from April to July, but some plants can be flowering up until October.

== Distribution and habitat ==
Thelesperma simplicifolium is native to the United States (Texas, New Mexico) and Mexico (Chihuahua,Coahuila, Nuevo León, Tamaulipas). The species can also be encountered as a waif (a non-established introduced plant) in California, where it is used in roadside plantings.

It typically grows in openings in oak or juniper woodlands or desert scrub (usually on limestone) at elevations of 100 to 1500 metres from sea level.

== Conservation ==
As of December 2024, the conservation group NatureServe listed Thelesperma simplicifolium as Apparently Secure (G4) worldwide. This status was last reviewed on 7 January 1994.

== Taxonomy ==
Thelesperma simplicifolium was first named and described by Asa Gray as Cosmidium simplicifolium in 1849. Later that same year, Asa moved the species to the genus Thelesperma and kept the species epithet the same.

=== Varieties ===
As of July 2023, Plants of the World Online accepts two varieties of Thelesperma simplicifolium:

- Thelesperma simplicifolium var. macrocarpum Melchert. (Nuevo León)
- Thelesperma simplicifolium var. simplicifolium (Texas, northeast and southwest Mexico)
