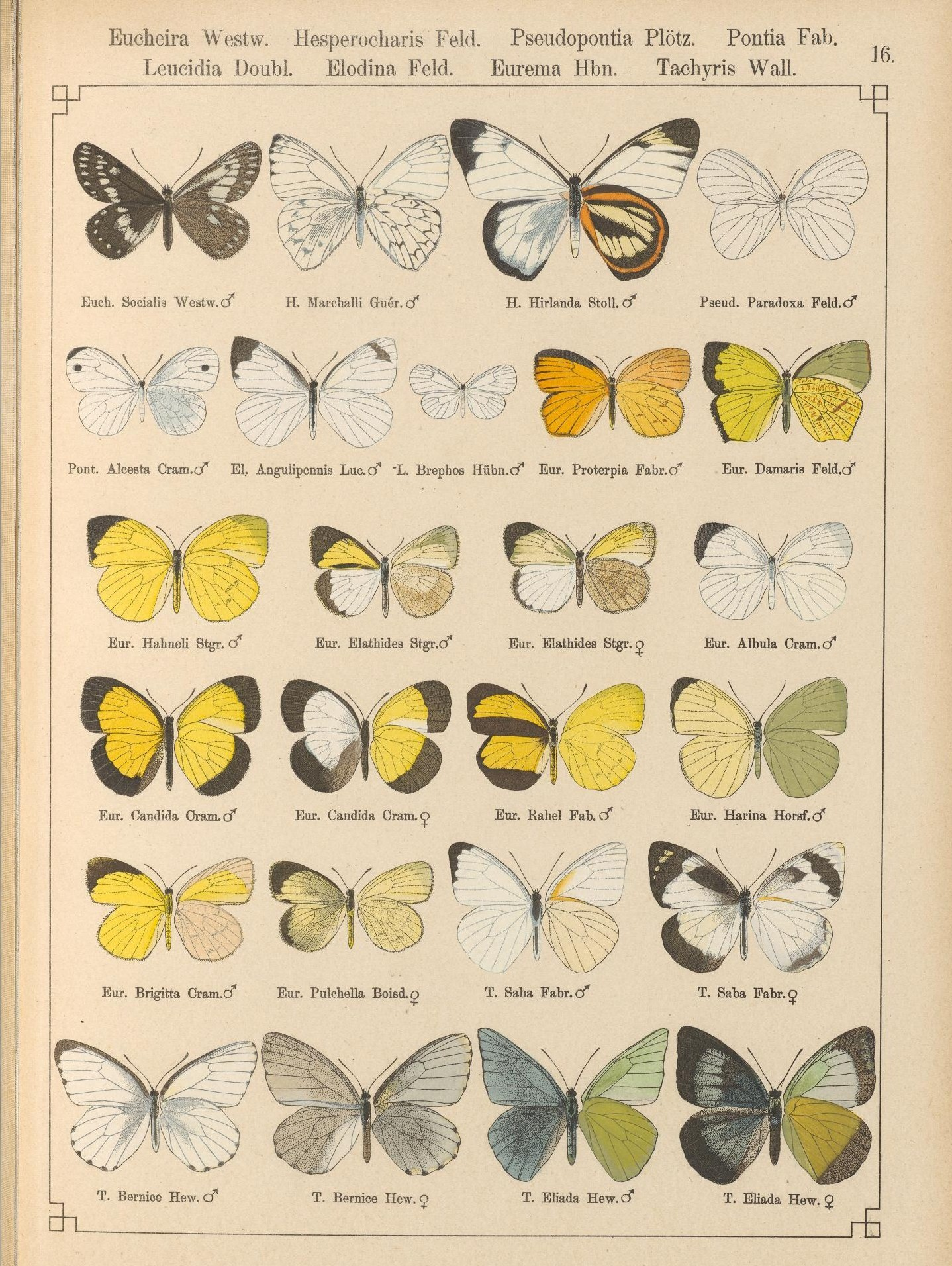

Scientific classification
- Kingdom: Animalia
- Phylum: Arthropoda
- Class: Insecta
- Order: Lepidoptera
- Family: Pieridae
- Tribe: Euremini
- Genus: Leucidia; Doubleday, 1847

Species
- See text.

Synonyms
- Heurema Herrich-Schäffer, 1867 (preocc. Agassiz, 1846)

= Leucidia =

Butterfly genus in family Pieridae

Leucidia is a genus of butterflies in the family Pieridae. They are native to the South America.

== Species ==
- Leucidia brephos (Hübner, [1809])
- Leucidia elvina (Godart, 1819)
