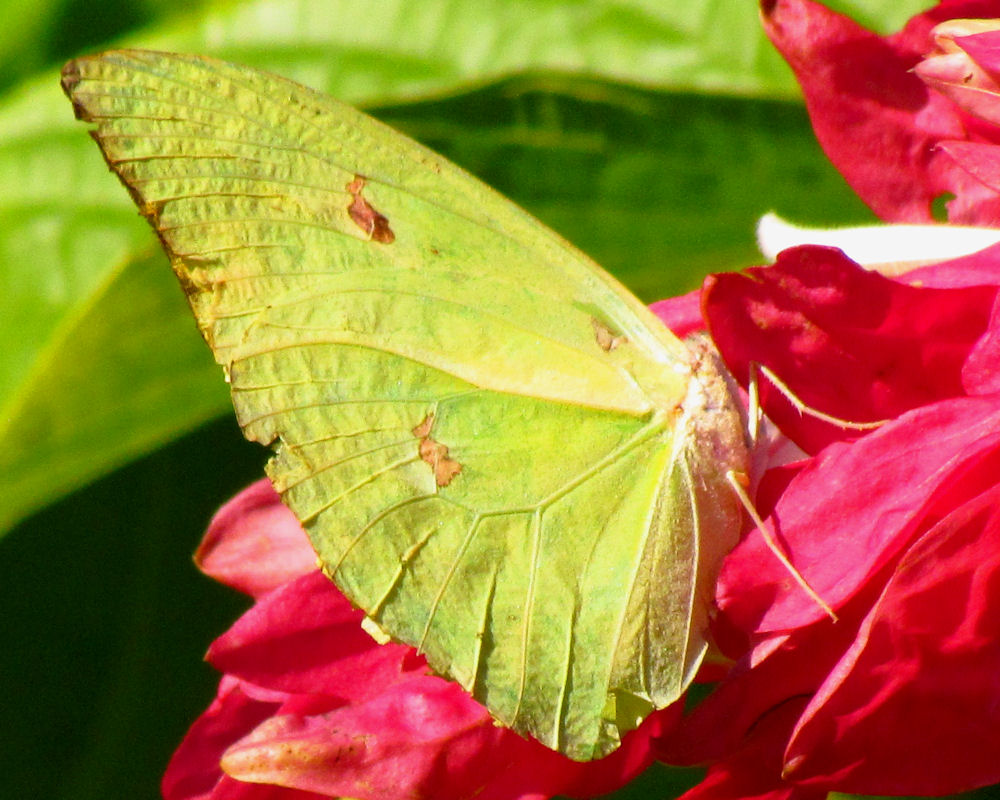
- In Tambopata Park, Peru

Scientific classification
- Kingdom: Animalia
- Phylum: Arthropoda
- Clade: Pancrustacea
- Class: Insecta
- Order: Lepidoptera
- Family: Pieridae
- Genus: Anteos
- Species: A. menippe

Binomial name
- Anteos menippe (Hübner, [1818])

Synonyms
- List: Mancipium menippe Hübner, [1818]; Colias leachiana Godart, 1819; Rhodocera menippe metioche Fruhstorfer, 1907; Gonepteryx menippe ab. calypso Röber, 1909; Gonepteryx menippe ab. thetis Röber, 1909

= Anteos menippe =

Orange-tipped angled-sulphur

Species of butterfly

Anteos menippe, the great orange tip or orange-tipped angled-sulphur, is a neotropical butterfly of the family Pieridae.

== Distribution and habitat ==
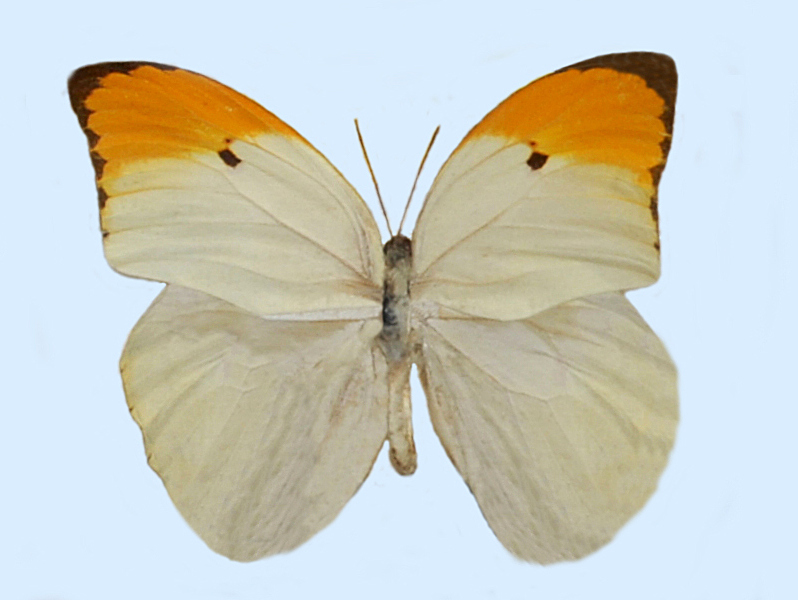
Anteos menippe. Mounted specimen, upperside

This species is present from Mexico to South America. These butterflies can be found in Colombia, Venezuela, Brazil, Ecuador, Peru and Panama. They prefer lowland areas and riverbanks.

== Description ==
Anteos menippe can reach a wingspan of 80–90 mm (3.1–3.5 in). In these fairly large butterflies the upperside of the males is pale yellow with pale orange (sometimes pink orange) large markings on the pointed forewing tips (as the common name suggests), with two dark brown spots and a dark brown border. Both sexes have a cryptic pale yellow to pale green leaf-like underside, with a pink disc dot on the front and rear wings. The females have two forms, one similar to the male and the other white, with black markings on the forewing edges. The underwings have several odd shaped orange markings.

== Biology ==
Caterpillars of Anteos menippe feed on plants of the Brassicaceae and Fabaceae (Cassia). Adults feed on the nectar of Cassia species. They are migrant along rivers.

== Bibliography ==
- G. Lamas (2008) Checklist of Pieridae of the World
- Lamas, G., C. Callaghan, M. M. Casagrande, O. Mielke, T. Pyrcz, R. Robbins and A. Viloria (2004) Checklist: Part 4A, Hesperioidea—Papilionoidea, in Atlas of Neotropical Lepidoptera. Association for Tropical Lepidoptera/Scientific Publishers, Gainesville, Florida.
- Ferrer-Paris, J.R., J.P. Rodríguez, T.C. Good, A.Y. Sánchez-Mercado, K.M. Rodríguez-Clark, G.A. Rodríguez & A. Solís (2013) Systematic, large-scale national biodiversity surveys: NeoMaps as a model for tropical regions, Diversity and Distributions. 19, 215–231
- Robinson, G. S., P. R. Ackery, I. J. Kitching, G. W. Beccaloni & L. M. Hernández (2010) HOSTS - A Database of the World's Lepidopteran Hostplants. Natural History Museum, London.
- Hübner (1818) Samml. exot. Schmett. 1:pl [147], f 1-2
