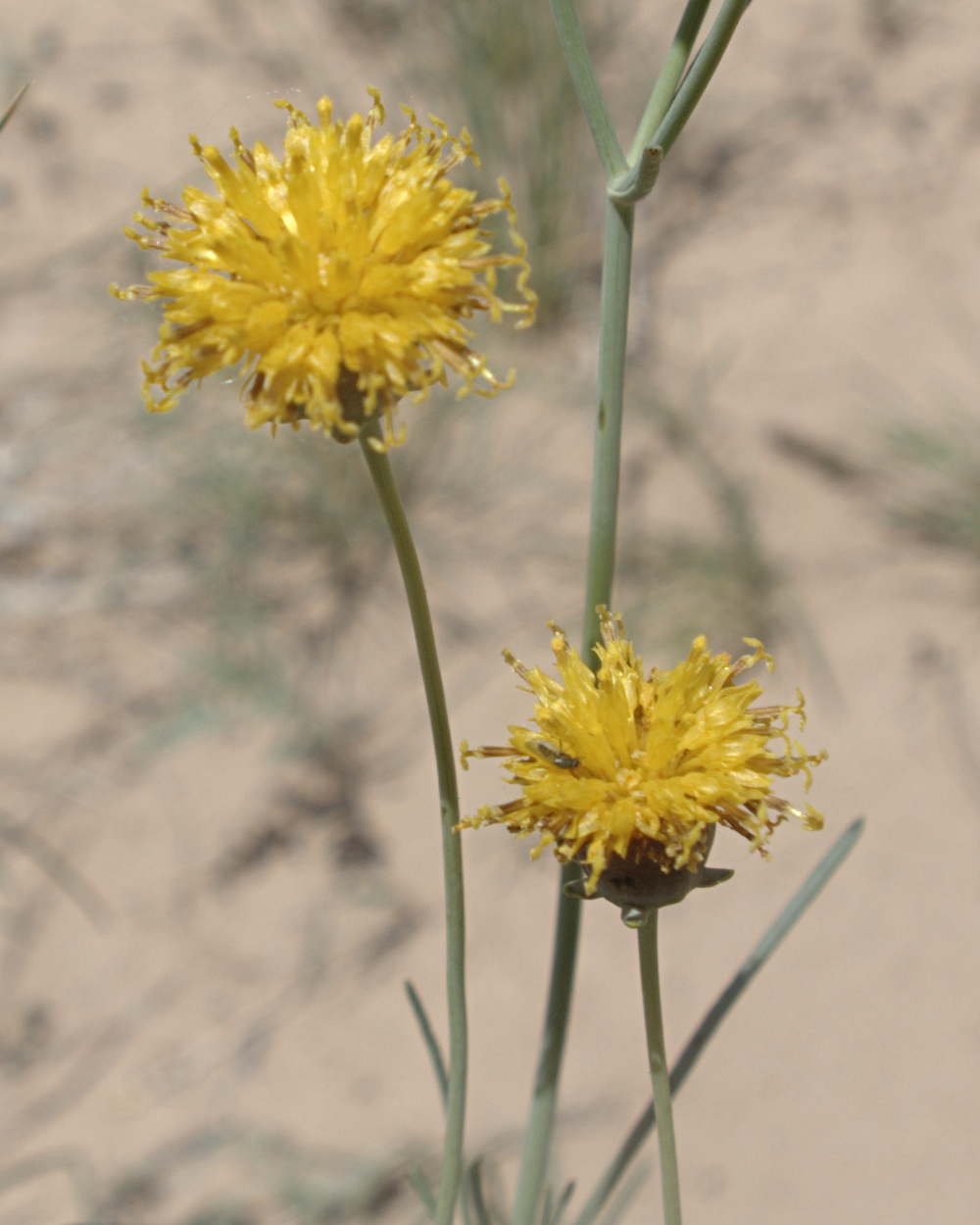

Conservation status
- Secure (NatureServe)

Scientific classification
- Kingdom: Plantae
- Clade: Tracheophytes
- Clade: Angiosperms
- Clade: Eudicots
- Clade: Asterids
- Order: Asterales
- Family: Asteraceae
- Genus: Thelesperma
- Species: T. megapotamicum

Binomial name
- Thelesperma megapotamicum (Spreng.) Kuntze

Synonyms
- Thelesperma gracile (Torr.) A.Gray

= Thelesperma megapotamicum =

Species of flowering plant

Thelesperma megapotamicum is a perennial, herbaceous (or slightly woody), flowering plant in the Asteraceae family native to sections of the Americas. It is known by the common names Hopi tea greenthread, rayless greenthread, Navajo tea, cota, and greenthread (a name it shares with other species in the genus).

== Description ==
Thelesperma megapotamicum is a perennial herb or subshrub that grows between 20 and 80 cm (7.9 and 31.5 in) tall. The leaves are mostly opposite, and are pinnately divided into linear to filiform lobes 2–4 cm long and up to 2.5 mm wide. The inflorescence bears several flower heads each in a cuplike involucre of phyllaries with purple-tinged, pointed lobes with white edges. The head contains many yellow or orange disc florets, and sometimes one or more yellow ray florets, although these may be absent. The cypselae are 5–8 mm long and are topped with two barbed awns each about 2 mm long.

The plant usually flowers from April to October.

== Distribution and habitat ==
Thelesperma megapotamicum is native to the portions of the central and southwestern United States (Arizona, Arkansas, Colorado, Kansas, Nebraska, New Mexico, Oklahoma, South Dakota, Texas, Wyoming), northern Mexico (Chihuahua, Coahuila), and some countries in South America.

It is introduced into portions of the United States (California, Minnesota, Michigan, Illinois, and possibly Oregon). According to the USDA Plants database, it is also introduced into Montana and Indiana.

=== Habitat ===
In North America, the plant grows in disturbed places in sand or clay, oak or juniper woodlands, desert scrub or yellow pine forests at elevations of 300 to 2,900 m (980 to 9,510 ft) from sea level.

== Conservation ==
As of December 2024, the conservation group NatureServe listed Thelesperma megapotamicum as Secure (G5) worldwide due to the species occurring in a large variety of habitats and having no apparent vulnerabilities. This status was last reviewed on 31 May 2023.

At the individual state level in the United States, it is listed as Secure (S5) in Texas, Apparently Secure (S4) in Wyoming, Vulnerable (S3) in South Dakota, and Critically Imperiled (S1) in Utah. In the NatureServe database, the species is not assessed at any conservation level in any other state across its range.

== Taxonomy ==
Thelesperma megapotamicum was first described by Curt Polycarp Joachim Sprengel in 1826 under the name Bidens megapotamica. In 1898, Carl Ernst Otto Kuntze renamed the species to Thelesperma megapotamicum (its currently accepted name) in the Revis. Gen. Pl. publication.

=== Etymology ===
The species name, megapotamicum means "of the big river". In English, it is known by the common names Hopi Tea greenthread, rayless greenthread, Navajo tea, Cota, and greenthread.

== Human uses ==
Native American groups such as the Hopi, Apache, and Navajo use this plant to make herbal teas, as a medicinal remedy and a yellow dye. The Hopi name for this plant is hohoysi. The plant can be boiled whole until the water turns a rusty color and used as a tea. In addition, the Hopi people also add the plant, along with water, into large glass jars and place in the sun to make sun tea.

It is known as izeets'ósé in Apache.
