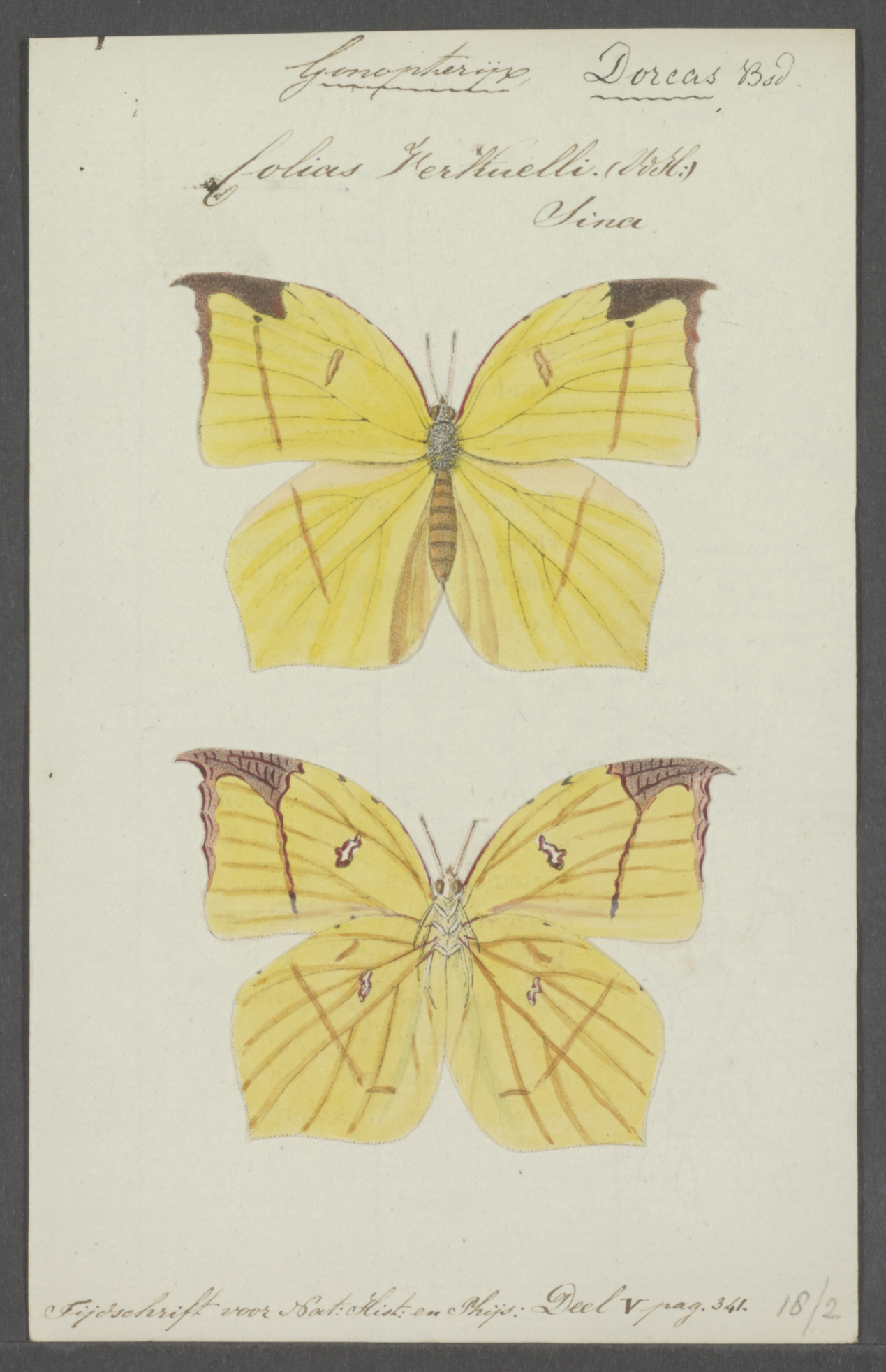

Scientific classification
- Kingdom: Animalia
- Phylum: Arthropoda
- Clade: Pancrustacea
- Class: Insecta
- Order: Lepidoptera
- Family: Pieridae
- Tribe: Goniopterygini
- Genus: Dercas; Doubleday, [1847]

Species
- See text

= Dercas =

Butterfly genus in family Pieridae

Dercas is a genus of butterflies in the family Pieridae found in southeast Asia.

== Species ==
Listed alphabetically:

- Dercas enara Swinhoe, 1899
- Dercas gobrias Hewitson, 1864
- Dercas lycorias (Doubleday, 1842) – plain sulphur
- Dercas nina Mell, 1913
- Dercas verhuelli (Hoeven, 1839) – tailed sulphur
