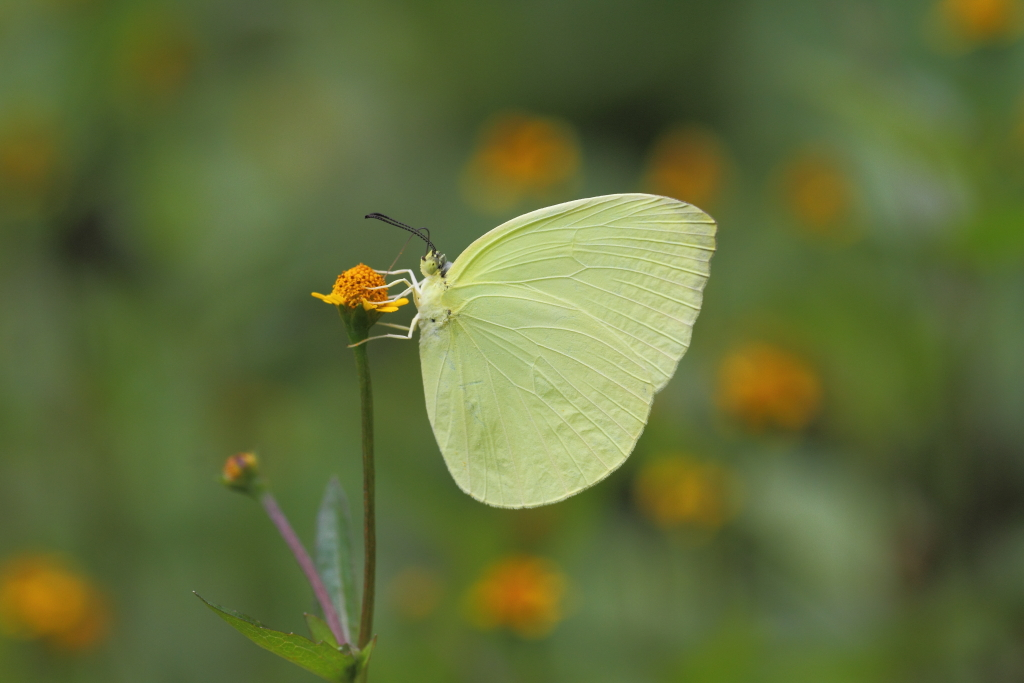

Scientific classification
- Kingdom: Animalia
- Phylum: Arthropoda
- Clade: Pancrustacea
- Class: Insecta
- Order: Lepidoptera
- Family: Pieridae
- Genus: Gandaca
- Species: G. harina

Binomial name
- Gandaca harina (Horsfield, 1829)

= Gandaca harina =

Tree yellow

Species of butterfly

Gandaca harina, the tree yellow, is a butterfly in the family Pieridae. It is found in India, Thailand, Cambodia, Myanmar, Malaysia, Singapore, Philippines, and Indonesia. The species was first described by Thomas Horsfield in 1829.

== Description ==
Gandaca harina is a small butterfly with a wingspan ranging from 35 to 45 mm. The upperside of the forewings and hindwings in males is lemon-yellow, while females are paler or greenish-white with a narrow, dark brown border on the forewing apex. The underside of both sexes is uniformly plain pale yellow without any dark markings or spots, serving as a primary distinguishing characteristic separating it from similar Eurema species.

== Subspecies ==
- Gandaca harina assamica Moore, 1906 – (Assam, Sikkim, Bengal)
- Gandaca harina andamana Moore, 1906 – (Andaman)
- Gandaca harina nicobarica Evans, 1932 – (Nicobar)
- Gandaca harina harina – (Java)
- Gandaca harina burmana Moore, 1906 – (S.Burma, Thailand - S.Vietnam)
- Gandaca harina auriflua Fruhstorfer, 1899 – (Sula Is., Banggai)
- Gandaca harina distanti Fruhstorfer, 1910 – (Peninsular Malaya, Singapore, Langkawi, Sumatra)
- Gandaca harina austrosundana Fruhstorfer, 1910 – (Lombok)
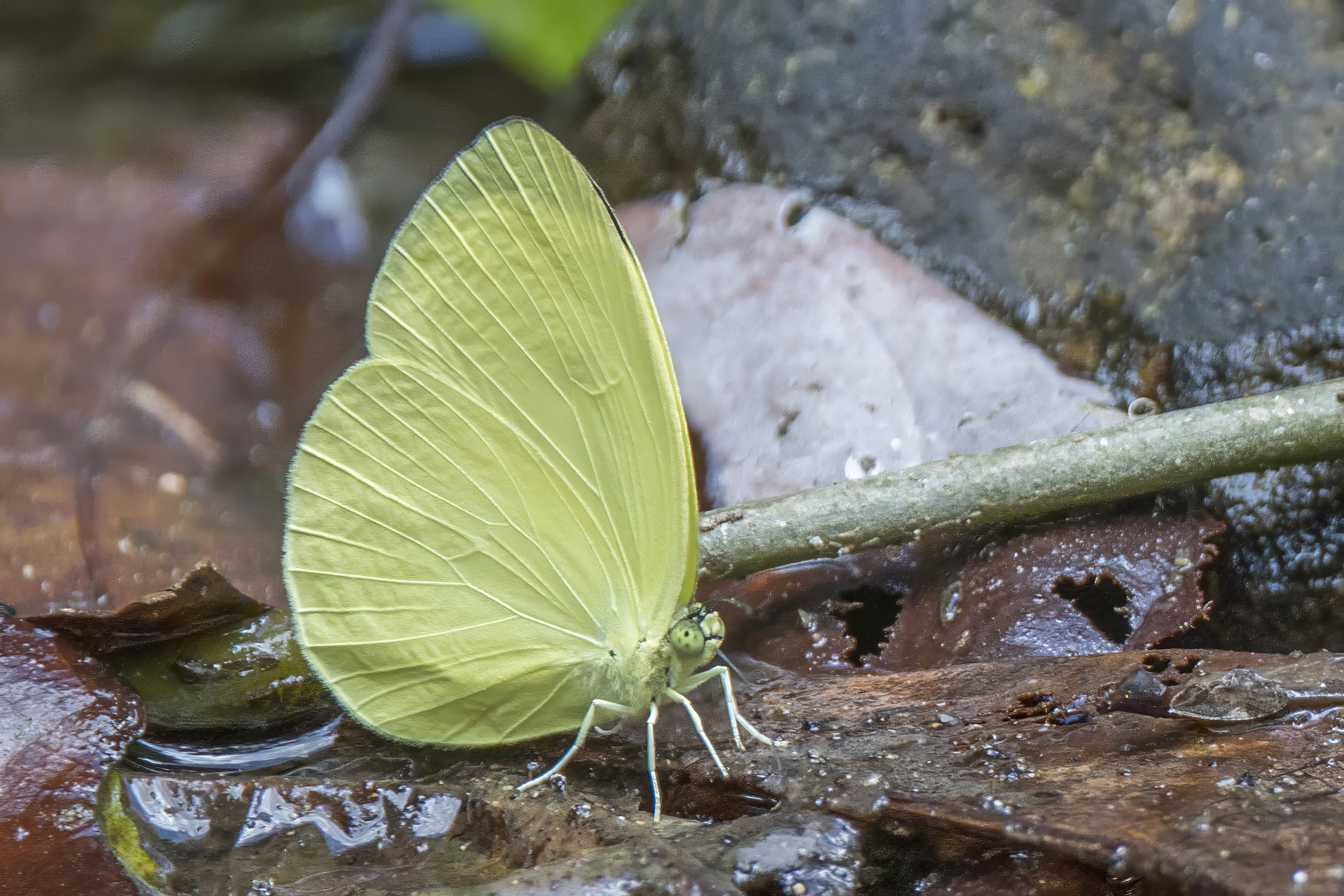
G. h. mindanaensis, Luzon, Philippines

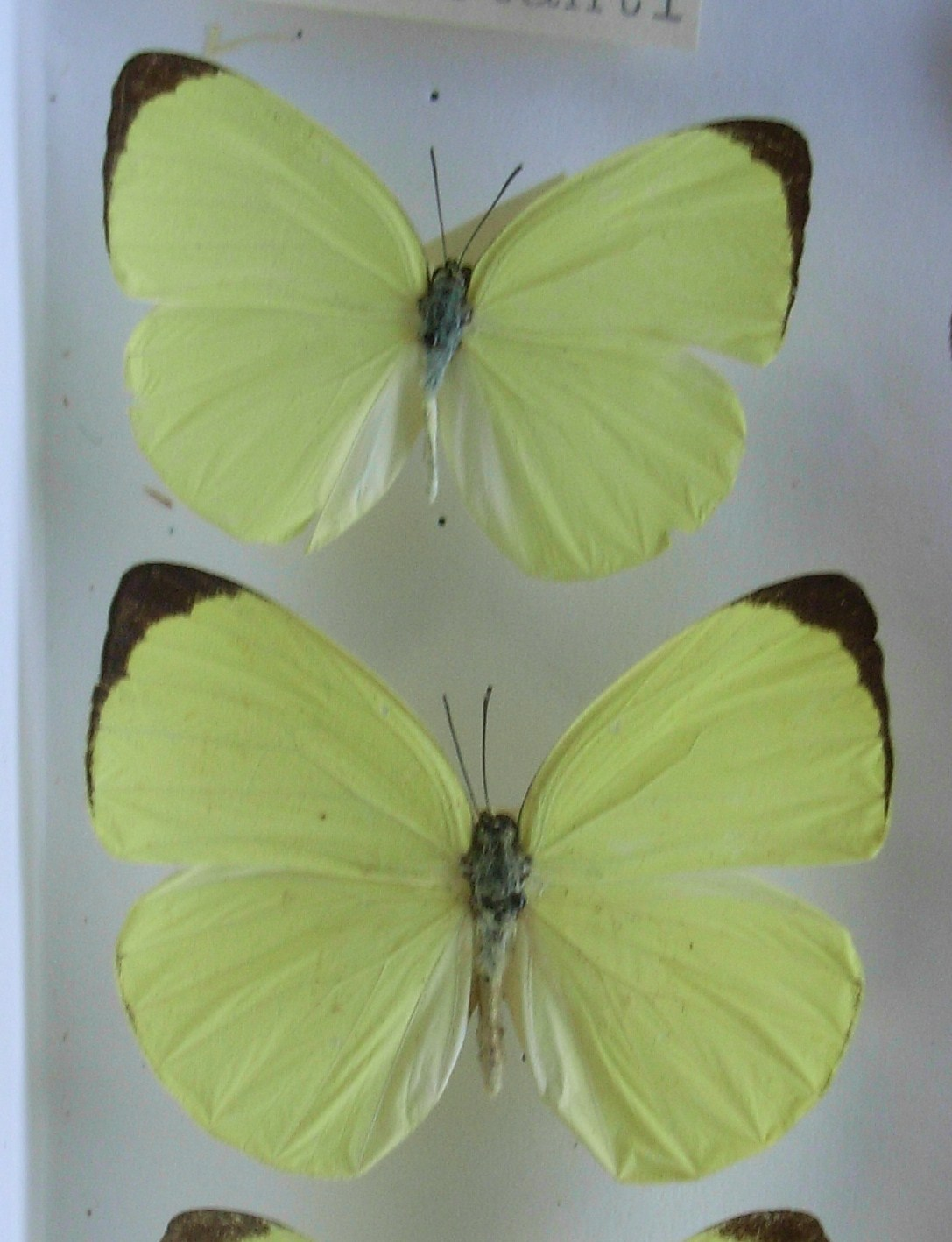
G. h. distanti specimens from Malaya
