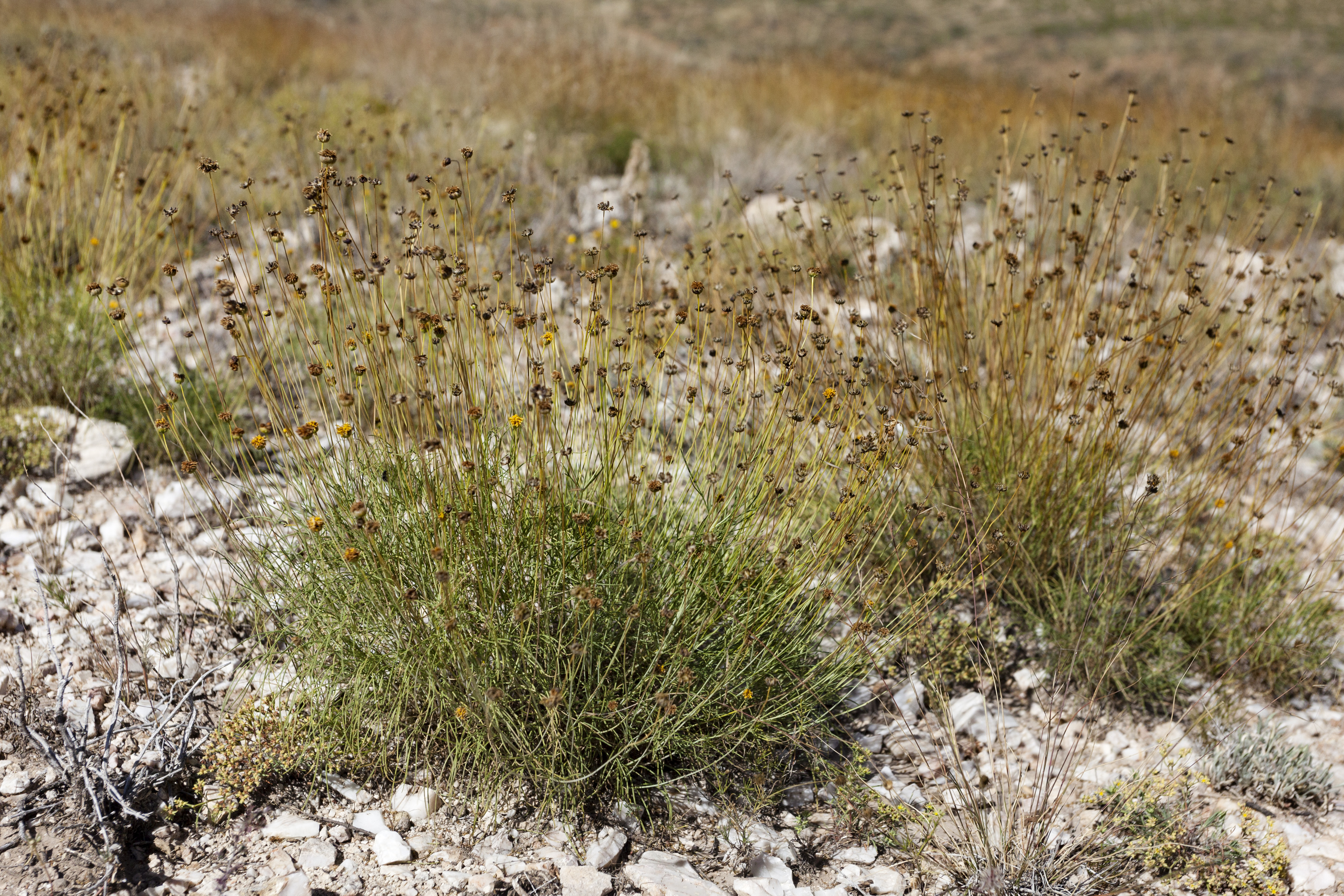

Conservation status
- Apparently Secure (NatureServe)

Scientific classification
- Kingdom: Plantae
- Clade: Tracheophytes
- Clade: Angiosperms
- Clade: Eudicots
- Clade: Asterids
- Order: Asterales
- Family: Asteraceae
- Genus: Thelesperma
- Species: T. longipes

Binomial name
- Thelesperma longipes A.Gray

= Thelesperma longipes =

Species of flowering plant

Thelesperma longipes, commonly called the longstalk greenthread, is a perennial herb or subshrub in the Asteraceae family. It is found from Arizona to northeast Mexico.

== Description ==
Thelesperma longipes is a perennial herb or subshrub that grows 20 to 40 cm (7.9 to 15.7 in) tall. The cauline leaves are "mostly crowded over proximal 1/4–1/2 of plant heights". The internodes are mostly 5 to 25 mm (0.20 to 0.98 in) long; the lobes are mostly linear to filiform, and are 5–45 × 0.5-1 mm. It flowers from March to October. There are 0 ray florets per flower head. The disc corollas are yellow, occasionally with red-brown nerves, the throats are equal to or longer than the lobes. The cypselae are 2-3 mm, and there are usually no pappi.

== Distribution and habitat ==
Thelesperma longipes grows in the United States (Arizona, Texas, New Mexico) and in Mexico (Coahuila, Nuevo León, San Luis Potosí, Tamaulipas) at elevations of 500 to 2100 meters from sea level on openings in desert scrub or limestone ridges.

== Conservation ==
As of November 2024, NatureServe (a conservation group) listed Thelesperma longipes as Apparently Secure (G4) worldwide with a note that the global status needs to be reviewed (since the last review was in 1994)

== Taxonomy ==
Thelesperma longipes was first named by Asa Gray in 1852 in the publication Smithsonian Contributions to Knowledge. Washington, DC.
