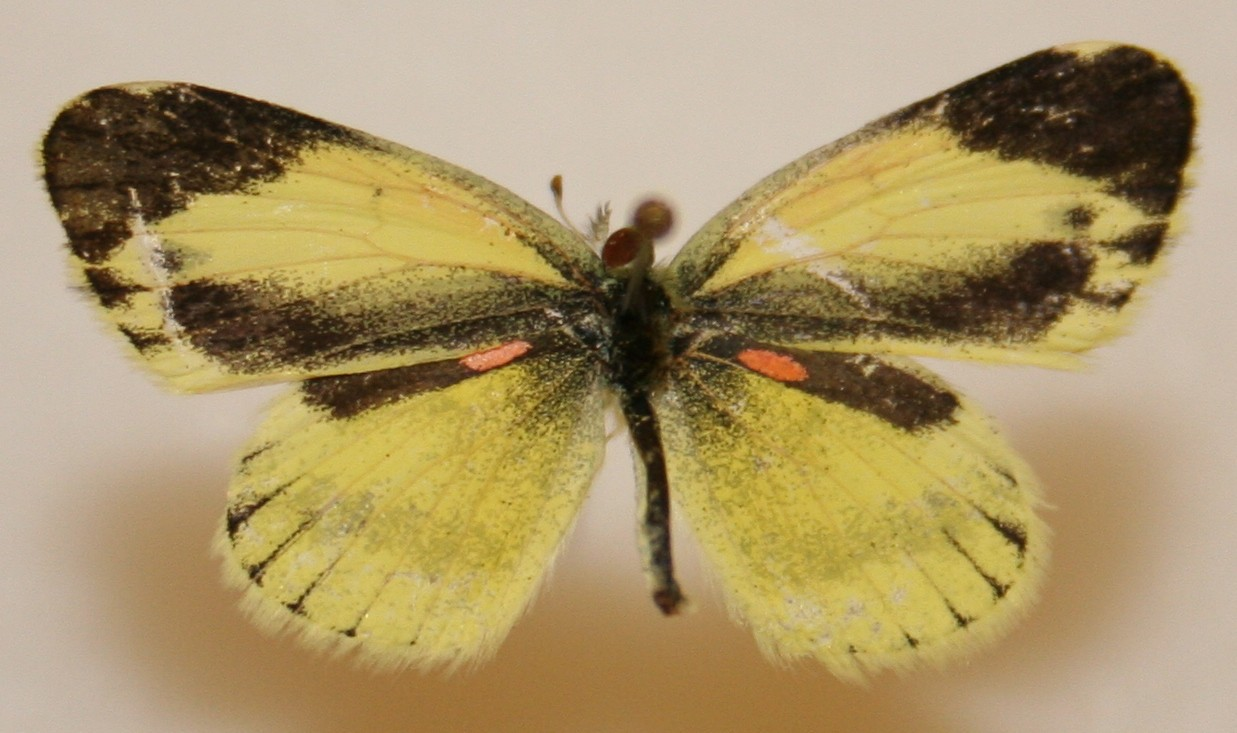

Conservation status
- Secure (NatureServe)

Scientific classification
- Kingdom: Animalia
- Phylum: Arthropoda
- Class: Insecta
- Order: Lepidoptera
- Family: Pieridae
- Genus: Nathalis
- Species: N. iole

Binomial name
- Nathalis iole (Boisduval, 1836)

= Nathalis iole =

Dainty sulphur

Species of butterfly

Nathalis iole, the dainty sulphur or dwarf yellow, is a North American butterfly in the family Pieridae.

== Description ==
This species is the smallest North American pierid. A rare population, known from Homestead (Smith et al., 1994), is said to have mostly white individuals. Some feel that the dainty sulphur is so unique among pierids, in shape and in several structural features, that it should belong in a separate subfamily. Its appearance is highly variable but a subset of distinctive features aid in identification. The forewings' elongated shape is distinctive. The upperside of the wings is yellow with the tip of the forewing being black. Black bars extend along the trailing edge of the forewing and the leading edge of the hindwing. Male dainty sulphurs have an oval scent patch (called an androconial spot) in each hindwing bar. The androconial spot is reddish orange but fades to pale yellow after death. The underside of the wings varies depending on the season. Summer individuals have yellowish hindwings whereas winter individuals have greenish-gray hindwings. Both forms have black spots near the forewing margin and have a yellowish-orange patch near the base of the forewing.

== Similar species ==
Similar species in the dainty sulphur's range include the barred yellow (Eurema daira) and the little yellow (Eurema lisa).

The barred yellow is larger than the dainty sulphur, and the underside of the wings is either all grayish white or brownish red.

The little yellow is also larger than the dainty sulphur, lacks the dorsal forewing and hindwing black bars, and on the underside of the forewing lacks the black spots and the yellowish-orange patch.

== Habitat ==
The species lives in almost any open space including coastal flats, deserts, fields, roadsides, vacant lots and waste areas. It usually flies very low to the ground.

== Life cycle ==
Males patrol just inches above the ground in search of females. If a male finds a female and is faced with rejection, males are likely to engage in an open-winged display, showing off their dorsal bars and their androconial spots. This last-resort effort to impress the female will often make her reconsider her decision. Females lay their lemon-yellow or orange-yellow eggs singly on young or emerging leaves of the host plant. The eggs will hatch within 4–7 days. The larvae are quite variable. Some larvae are dark green, while others are dark green with bright pinkish-purple stripes. The stiff haired larvae have two pinkish-red bumps just above the head. The green or yellow-green chrysalis is covered with yellow-white dots. It lacks a projection on the head which is found in most pierids. The dainty sulphur will migrate south to spend the winter because it is unable to survive the cold. If day length is short when it is a larva, the dainty sulphur produces a winter phenotype upon forming its chrysalis which will then produce a butterfly with three times the usual number of dark scales. This allows it to absorb solar heat more easily. It has multiple broods per year.

== Host plants ==
Here are a list of host plants used by the dainty sulphur:

- Spanish needles, (Bidens bipinnata)
- Beggar ticks, (Bidens species)
- Dogweed, (Dyssodia species)
- Common chickweed, (Stellaria media)
- Greenthread, (Thelesperma species)

== Image gallery ==
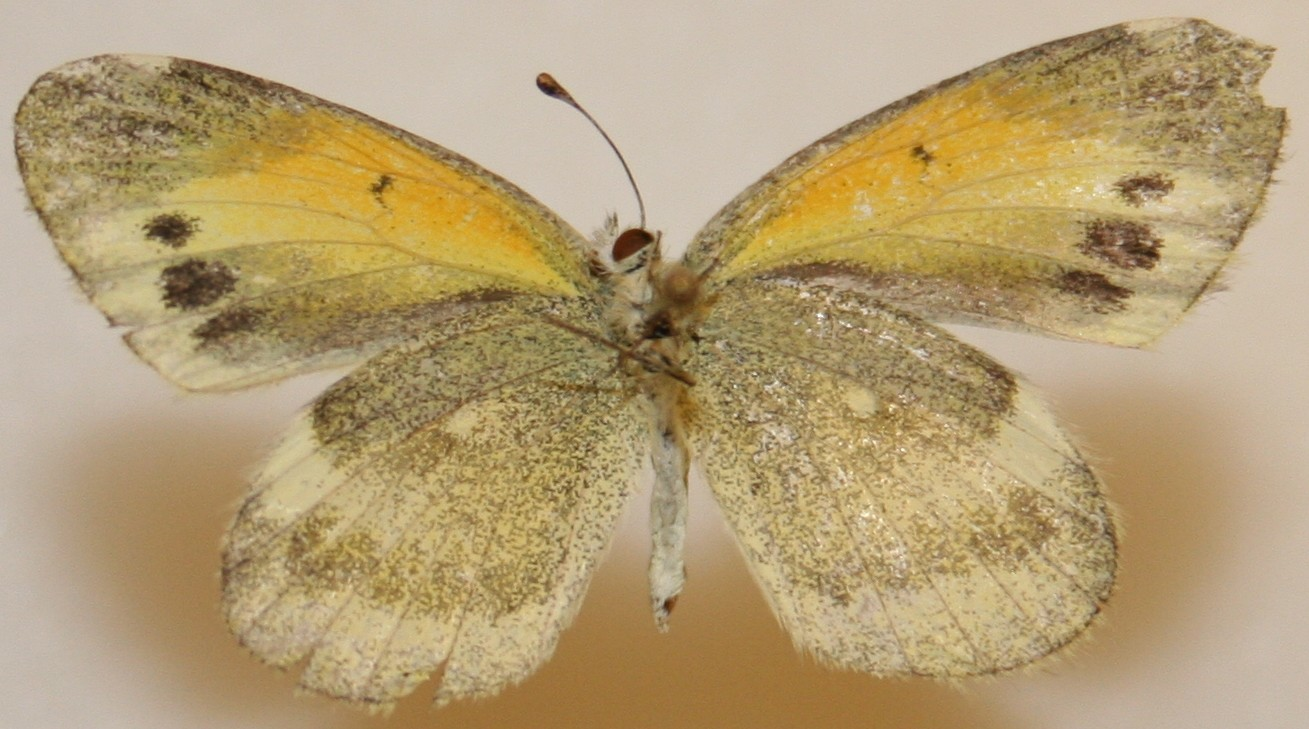
Underside of a summer form dainty sulphur

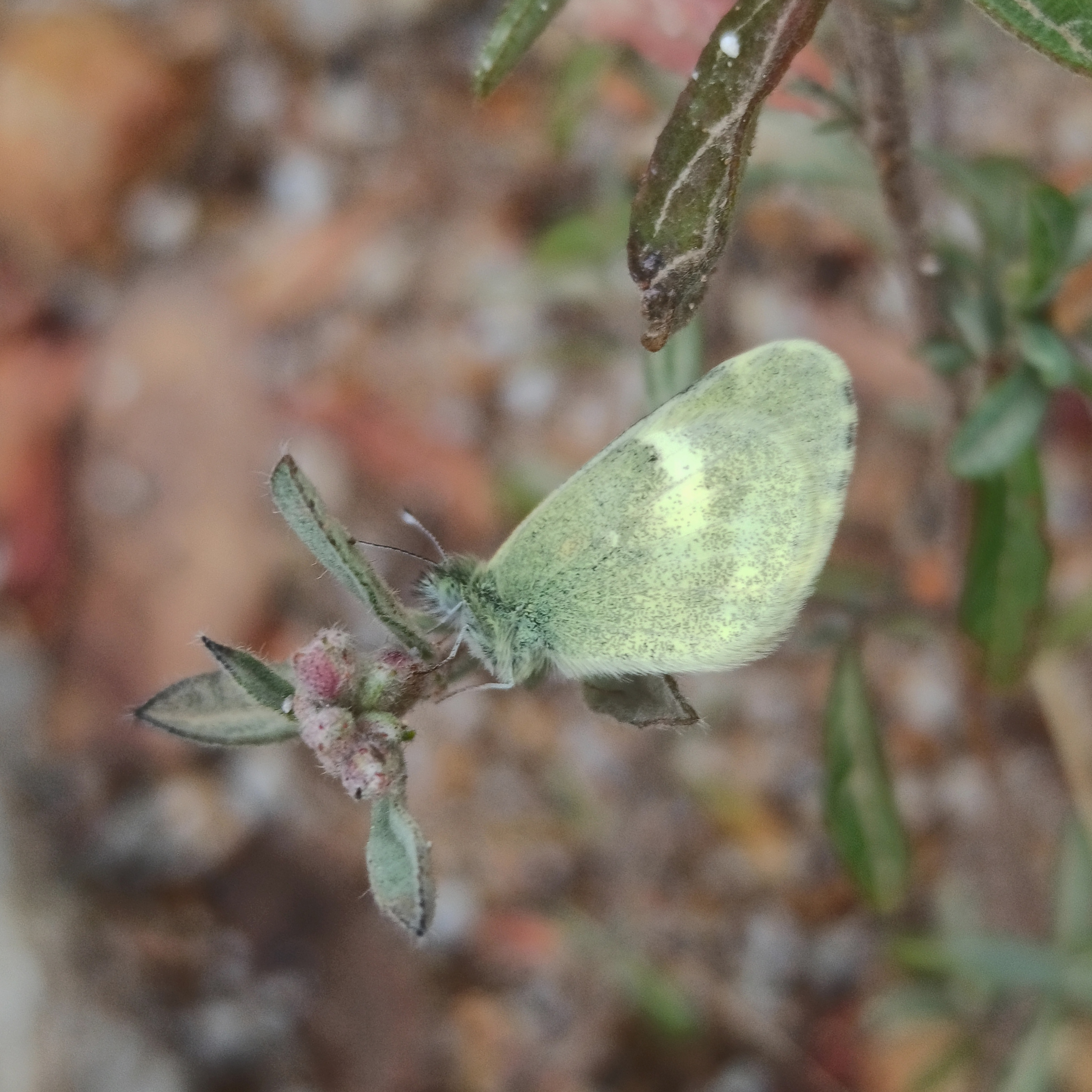
N. iole in Mexico
