= Prestonia, Missouri =

Unincorporated community in Missouri, U.S.

Coordinates: 36°30′45″N 92°21′01″W

Prestonia is an unincorporated community in Ozark County, Missouri, United States. The Prestonia site lies on a ridge above East Pidgeon Creek and is southwest of Howards Ridge. The Missouri-Arkansas border is approximately one mile to the south and Norfork Lake is about four miles to the east. Access is from Missouri Route J via county road J529.

== History ==
A post office called Prestonia was established in 1891, and remained in operation until 1913. The community was named after one Mr. Preston, the proprietor of a local mill.
