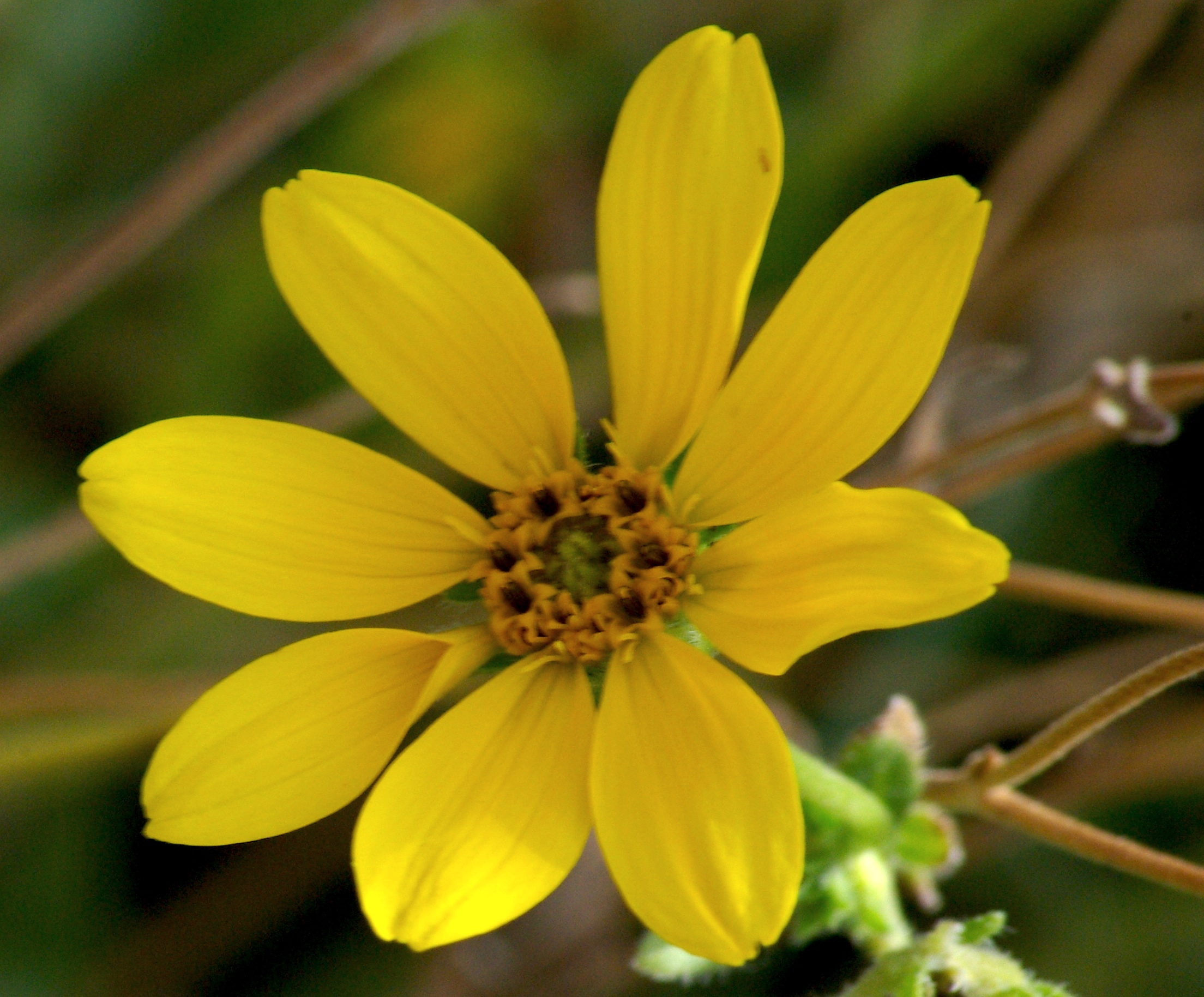
- Engelmannia peristenia

Scientific classification
- Kingdom: Plantae
- Clade: Tracheophytes
- Clade: Angiosperms
- Clade: Eudicots
- Clade: Asterids
- Order: Asterales
- Family: Asteraceae
- Subfamily: Asteroideae
- Tribe: Heliantheae
- Subtribe: Engelmanniinae
- Genus: Engelmannia; A.Gray ex Nutt. not Klotzsch (Euphorbiaceae) nor Pfeiff. (Convolvulaceae)

Type species
- Engelmannia pinnatifida Nutt.

Synonyms
- Angelandra Endl.

= Engelmannia =

Genus of flowering plants

Engelmannia, or Engelmann's daisy, is a genus of North American flowering plants in the family Asteraceae.

Species

- Engelmannia peristenia (Raf.) Goodman & C.A.Lawson - southern Great Plains of the central United States
- Engelmannia pinnatifida A.Gray ex Nutt. - Chihuahua, Coahuila, Nuevo León, Texas, New Mexico
