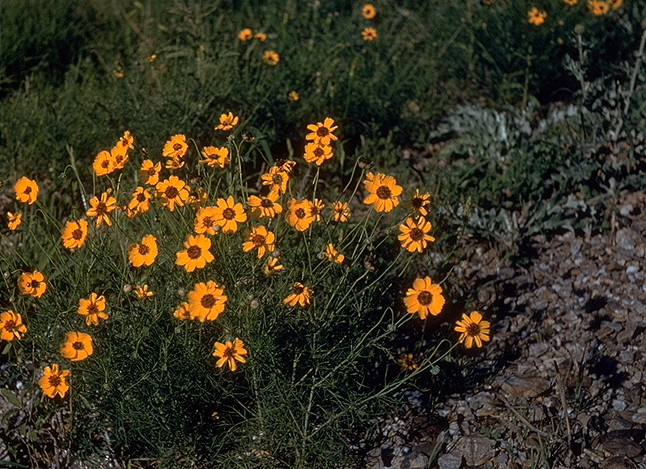
- Thelesperma filifolium

Scientific classification
- Kingdom: Plantae
- Clade: Tracheophytes
- Clade: Angiosperms
- Clade: Eudicots
- Clade: Asterids
- Order: Asterales
- Family: Asteraceae
- Subfamily: Asteroideae
- Tribe: Coreopsideae
- Genus: Thelesperma; Less.

Type species
- Thelesperma scabiosoides Less.

Synonyms
- Cosmidium Nutt.

= Thelesperma =

Genus of flowering plants

Thelesperma, commonly known as greenthreads, is a genus of annual or perennial herbs and subshrubs found in the Americas. Members of this genus are closely related to some species of Coreopsis and Bidens. The genus is considered to be within the family Asteraceae.

== Description ==
Plants of this genus are annual or perennial herbs or subshrubs that typically range from 10 to 70 cm (3.9 to 27.6 in) in height. Most species of this genus have opposite leaves that contain pinnately lobed, usually glabrous leaf blades. Depending on the species, the leaves can be mostly basal to mostly cauline. The species bear radiate or discoid flower heads that are borne singly or are in loose, corymbiform arrays. Each flower head contains up to eight ray florets (some sp. do not have ray florets) with yellow, reddish brown or yellow and brown bicolored corollas, and 20 to over 100 yellow or brown disc florets.

== Distribution ==
The genus is found from Alberta, (Canada) to north and west Mexico and from Argentina to Uruguay.

== Taxonomy ==
Thelesperma was first named and described by Christian Friedrich Lessing in 1831 in the journal Linnaea. The genus is closely related to parts of Coreopsis and to certain North American Bidens species (including Bidens coronata and Bidens comosa).

=== Etymology ===
The name Thelesperma is derived from the ancient Greek words θηλή (transl. grc – transl. Thele, meaning "nipple") and σπέρμα (transl. grc – transl. sperma, meaning "seed") referring to the papillate cypselae of some of the species.

In English, the genus is commonly known as greenthreads.

=== Species ===
As of July 2023, Plants of the World Online accepts 12 species for this genus:

- Thelesperma burridgeanum S.F.Blake - (Texas, Coahuila)
- Thelesperma filifolium (Hook.) A.Gray - (United States to northeast Mexico)
- Thelesperma flavodiscum (Shinners) B.L.Turner - (Texas, Louisiana, Arkansas)
- Thelesperma graminiformis (Sherff) Melchert - (Nuevo León, Tamaulipas)
- Thelesperma longipes A.Gray - (Arizona to Texas and northern Mexico)
- Thelesperma megapotamicum (Spreng.) Herter - (United States, Mexico, Uruguay, Argentina)
- Thelesperma muelleri (Sherff) Melchert - (Nuevo León, Tamaulipas)
- Thelesperma nuecense B.L.Turner - (Texas)
- Thelesperma scabridulum S.F.Blake - (Coahuila, Nuevo León, Tamaulipas)
- Thelesperma simplicifolium (A.Gray) A.Gray - (Texas, Mexico)
- Thelesperma subaequale S.F.Blake - (Coahuila, Nuevo León)
- Thelesperma subnudum A.Gray - (Alberta, central United States)

== Uses ==
Members of the genus are used by a number of the southwestern Native American peoples as an herbal tea. T. megapotamicum contains luteolin. It also appears that many of the species contain a very similar chromatographic profile, and thus may contain very similar profiles of flavenoids.
