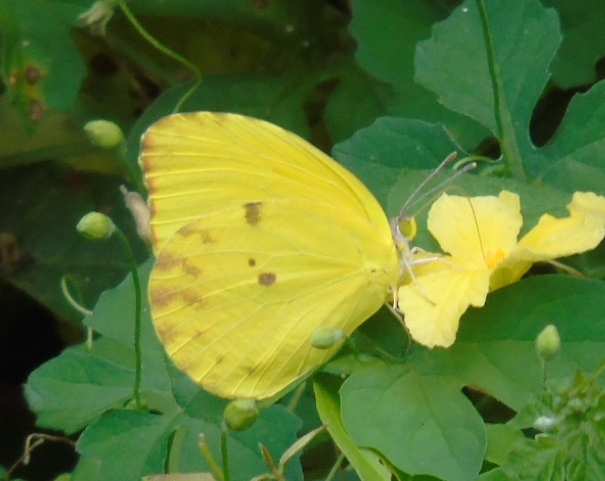
- Prestonia clarki, México

Scientific classification
- Kingdom: Animalia
- Phylum: Arthropoda
- Class: Insecta
- Order: Lepidoptera
- Family: Pieridae
- Tribe: Euremini
- Genus: Prestonia; Schaus, 1920

= Prestonia (butterfly) =

Butterfly genus in family Pieridae

Prestonia is a genus in the sulphurs and yellows butterfly family Pieridae. This genus has a single species, Prestonia clarki, found in Mexico.
