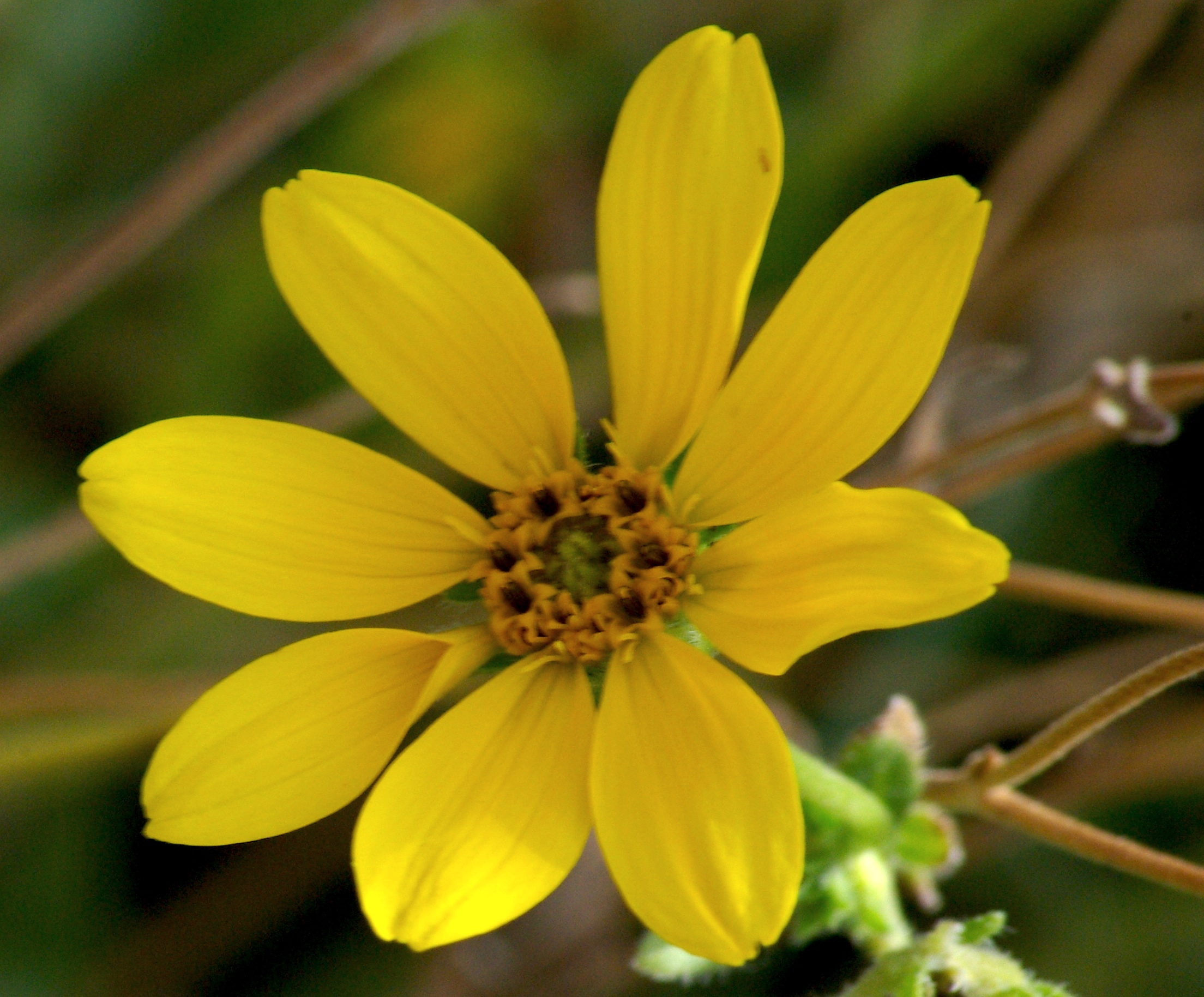

Conservation status
- Secure (NatureServe)

Scientific classification
- Kingdom: Plantae
- Clade: Tracheophytes
- Clade: Angiosperms
- Clade: Eudicots
- Clade: Asterids
- Order: Asterales
- Family: Asteraceae
- Genus: Engelmannia
- Species: E. peristenia

Binomial name
- Engelmannia peristenia (Raf.) Goodman & C.A.Lawson 1992

Synonyms
- Engelmannia texana Scheele 1849; Silphium peristenium Raf. 1832

= Engelmannia peristenia =

Species of flowering plant

Engelmannia peristenia, called Engelmann daisy or cutleaf daisy, is a North American species of flowering plants in the family Asteraceae. It is native to the south-central United States, primarily from Texas, New Mexico, Oklahoma, and southeastern Colorado, but with more isolated populations in Arizona, Louisiana, Arkansas, Missouri, Nebraska, and South Dakota.

Engelmannia peristenia is a branching perennial herb up to 100 cm (40 inches) tall. Leaves at the base can be up to 30 cm (1 foot) long, with the leaves progressively getting smaller higher on the stem. The plant produces many small flower heads, each generally with 8 ray florets and 40-50 disc florets. Flowers bloom March to July. Its habitats include grasslands, roadsides, and pinion-juniper woodlands.
