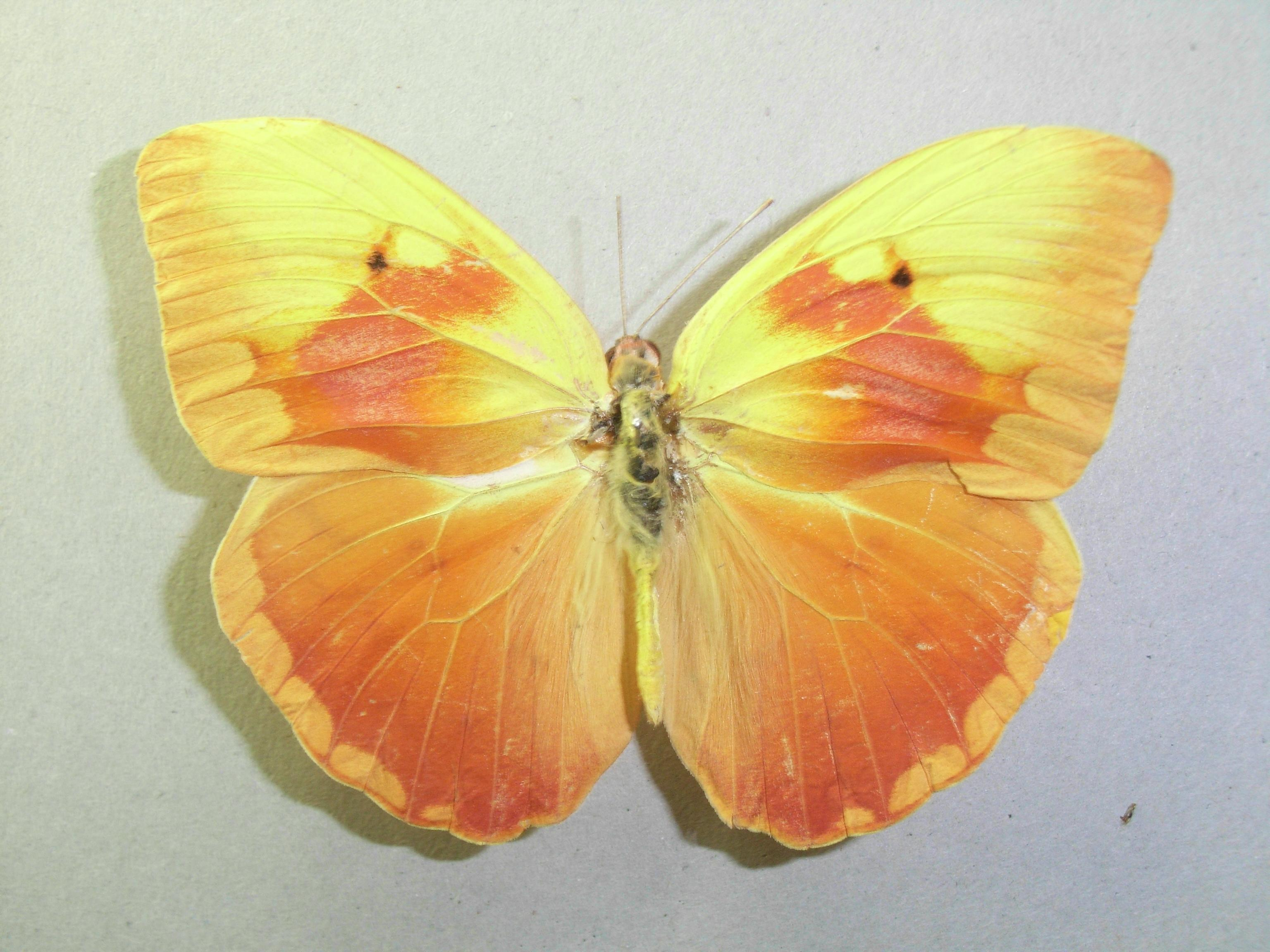
- Phoebis avellaneda

Scientific classification
- Kingdom: Animalia
- Phylum: Arthropoda
- Clade: Pancrustacea
- Class: Insecta
- Order: Lepidoptera
- Family: Pieridae
- Tribe: Coliadini
- Genus: Phoebis; Hübner, [1819]

Species
- See text

Synonyms
- Colias Hübner, [1819] (preocc. Colias Fabricius, 1807); Callidryas Boisduval & Leconte, [1830]; Metura Butler, 1873; Parura Kirby, 1896

= Phoebis =

Butterfly genus in family Pieridae

Phoebis, or sulphurs, is a genus of butterflies, belonging to the subfamily Coliadinae of the "whites" or family Pieridae. They are native to the Americas.

== Selected species ==
- Phoebis agarithe (Boisduval, [1836]) – large orange sulphur (southern US to Peru)
- Phoebis argante (Fabricius, 1775) – apricot sulphur, Argante giant sulphur (Mexico to Peru and Brazil, Caribbean)
- Phoebis avellaneda (Herrich-Schäffer, 1865) – red-splashed sulphur (Cuba)
- Phoebis bourkei (Dixey, 1933) – (Ecuador)
- Phoebis editha (Butler, 1870) – Edith's sulphur (Haiti)
- Phoebis marcellina
- Phoebis neocypris (Hübner, [1823]) – tailed sulphur (Mexico to Peru, Brazil)
- Phoebis philea (Linnaeus, 1763) – orange-barred sulphur, yellow apricot (Mexico to Peru, Brazil, Cuba, Hispaniola)
- Phoebis sennae (Linnaeus, 1758) – cloudless

sulphur, common yellow (southern North America to South America)

Moved:

- Phoebis orbis moved to Aphrissa orbis (Poey, 1832) – orbed sulphur

== Gallery ==
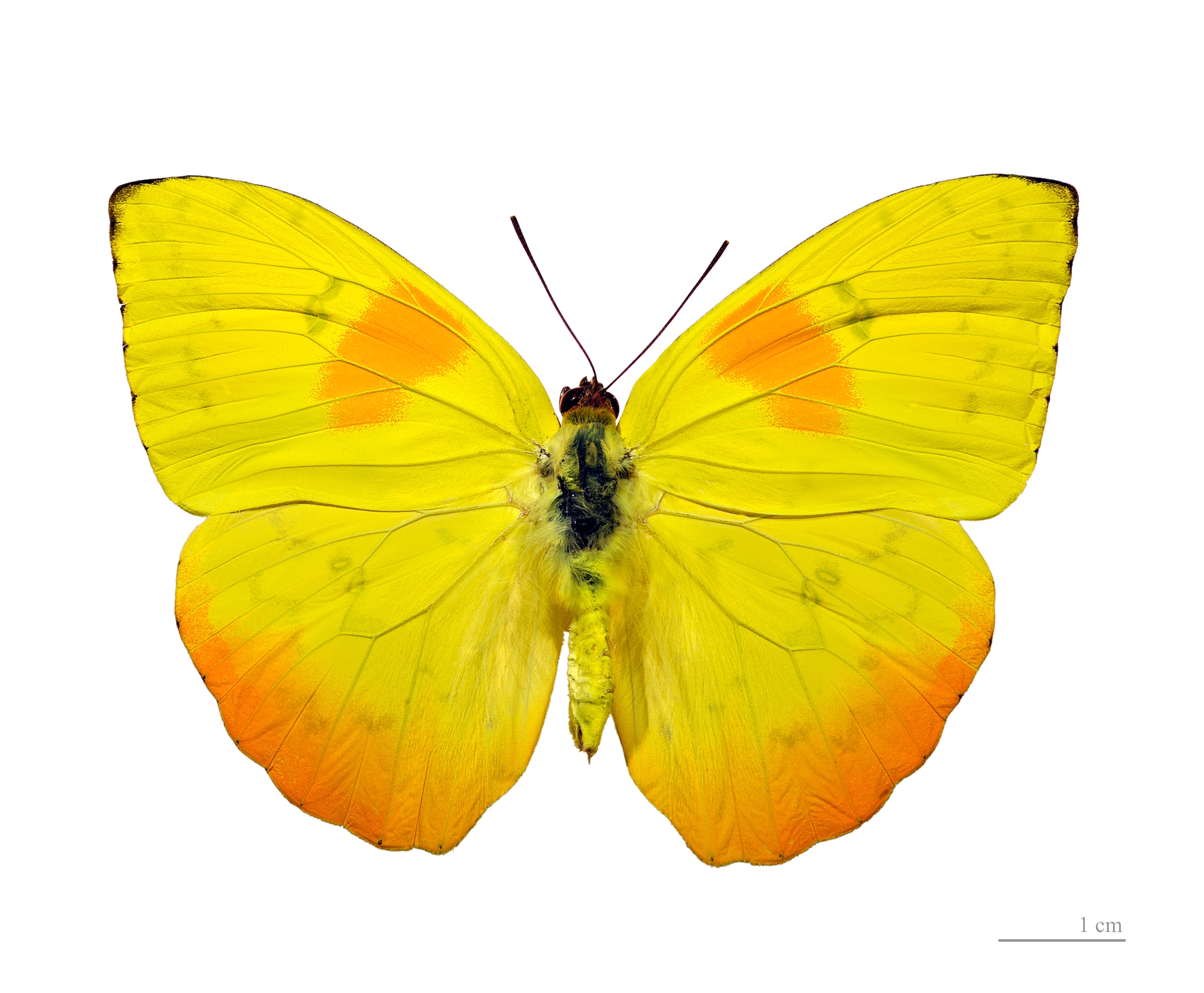
Orange-barred sulphur

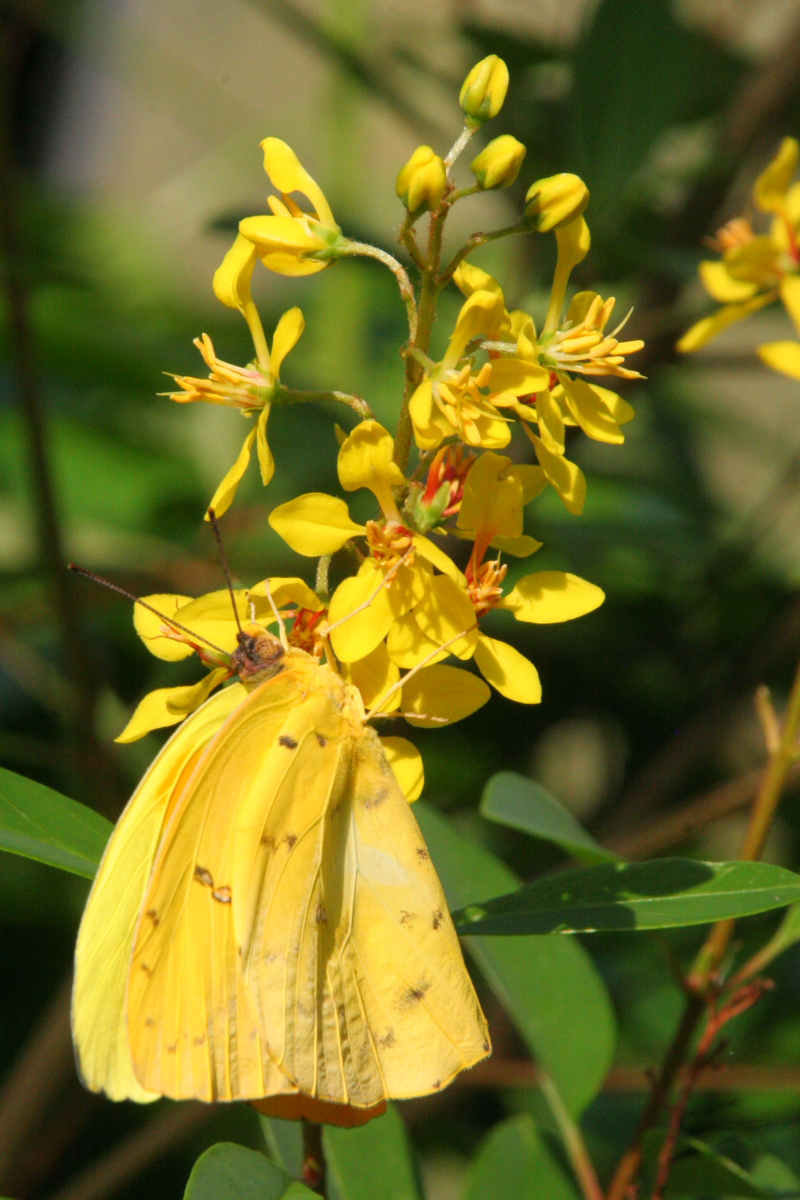
Cloudless sulphur, Monsanto Insectarium, St. Louis Zoo
