= Tailed sulphur =

Tailed sulphur may refer to:

- Dercas verhuelli, a butterfly endemic to Indochina
- Phoebis neocypris, a butterfly found in Central and South America
