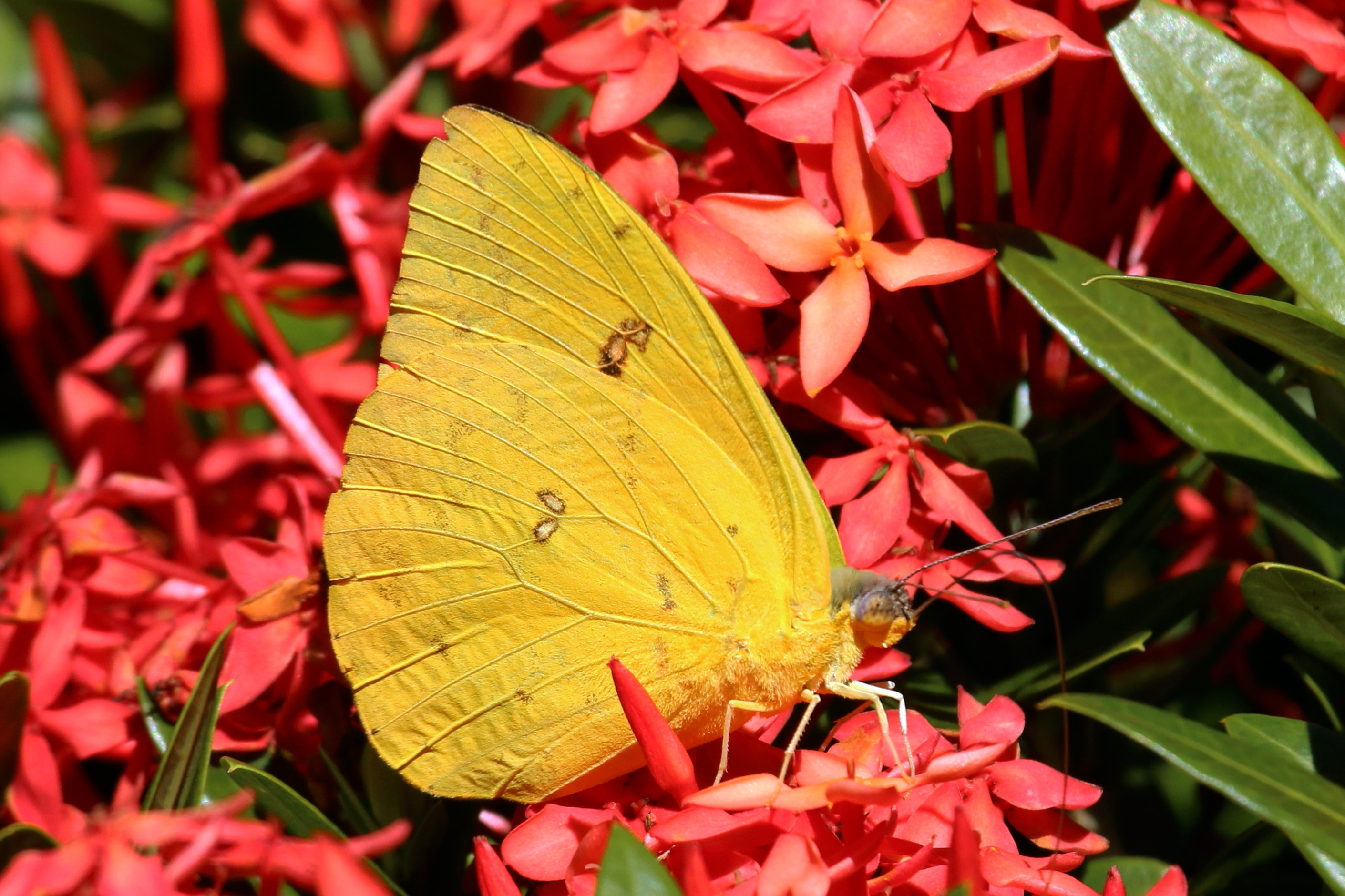
- Male P. s. sennae, Tobago
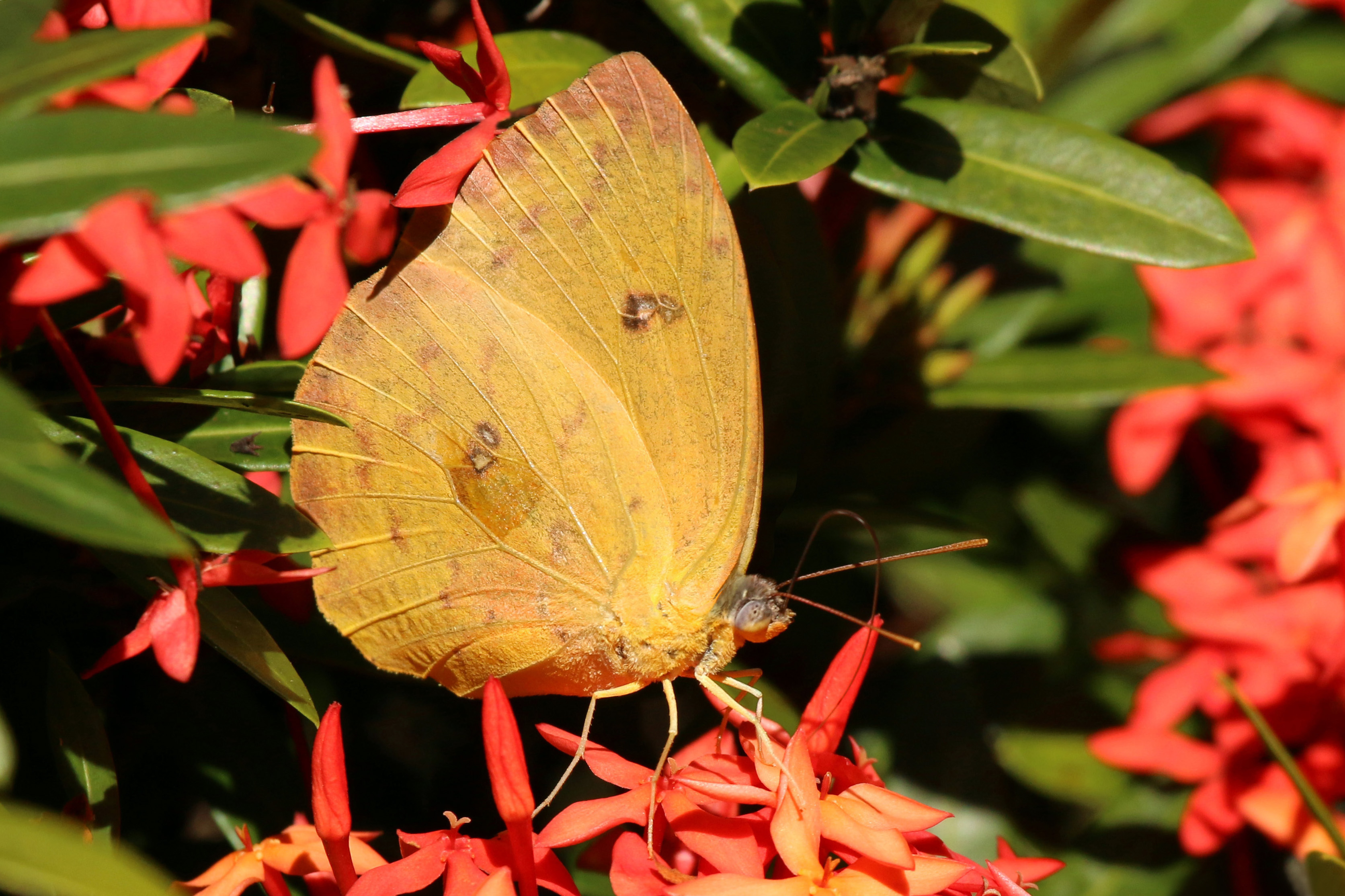
- Female P. s. sennae, Tobago

Conservation status
- Secure (NatureServe)

- Least Concern (IUCN 3.1)

Scientific classification
- Kingdom: Animalia
- Phylum: Arthropoda
- Clade: Pancrustacea
- Class: Insecta
- Order: Lepidoptera
- Family: Pieridae
- Genus: Phoebis
- Species: P. sennae

Binomial name
- Phoebis sennae (Linnaeus, 1758)

Subspecies
- Three, see text

Synonyms
- Papilio sennae

= Phoebis sennae =

Cloudless sulphur

Species of butterfly

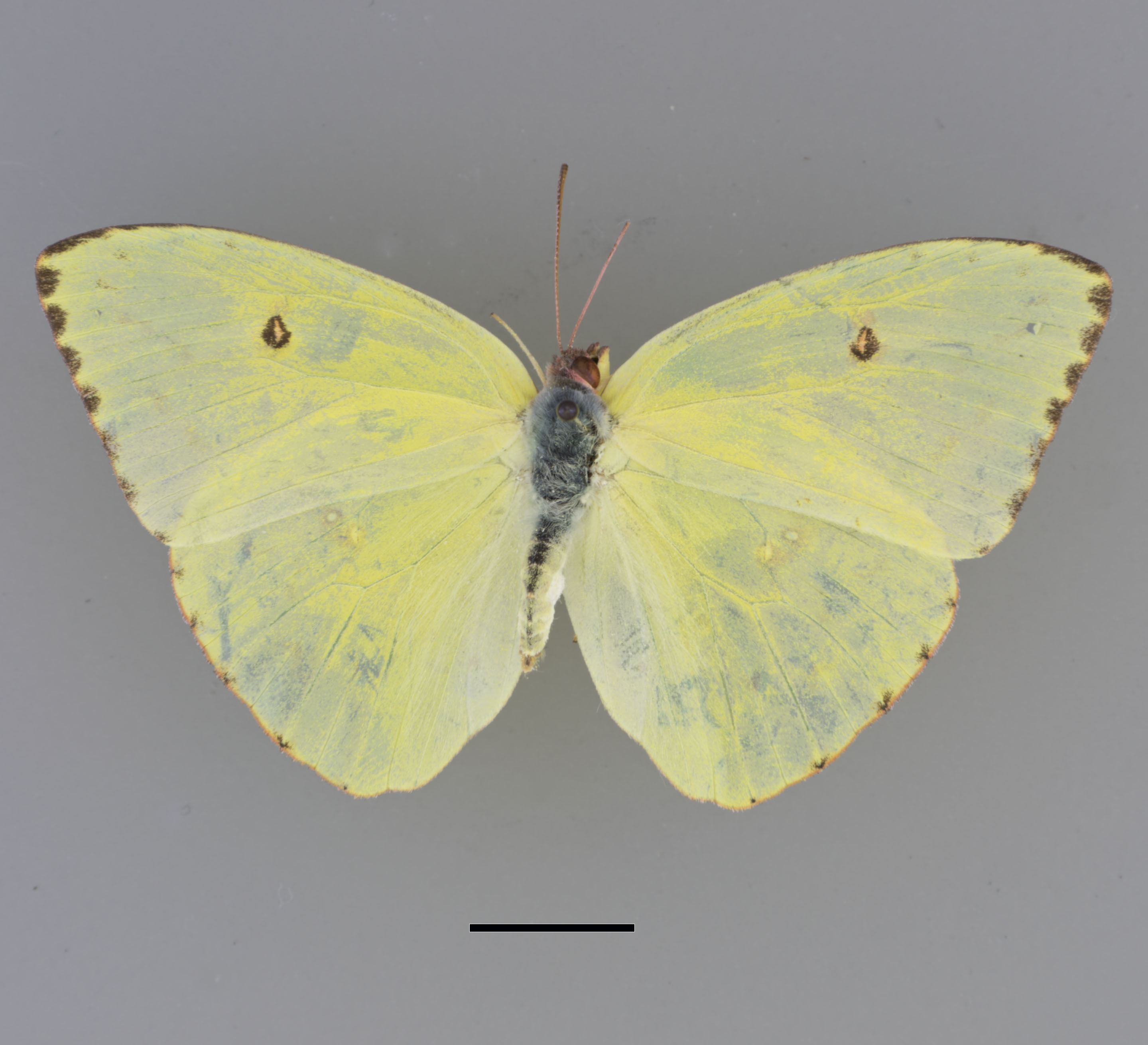
Collected in GA, Baldwin County, Lake Laurel on 6 September 2024 by Kaitlin Acosta. Phoebis sennae (Linnaeus 1758). Order: Lepidoptera. Family: Pieridae. Scale bar 1 cm.

Phoebis sennae, the cloudless sulphur, is a mid-sized butterfly in the family Pieridae found in the Americas. There are several similar species such as the clouded sulphur (Colias philodice), the yellow angled-sulphur (Anteos maerula), which has angled wings, the statira sulphur (Aphrissa statira), and other sulphurs, which are much smaller. The species name comes from the genus Senna to which many of the larval host plants belong.

== Distribution ==
Their range is wide, from South America to southern Canada, in particular southwestern Ontario. They are most common from Argentina to southern Texas, Georgia, and Florida, but are often visitors outside this range becoming more rare further north.

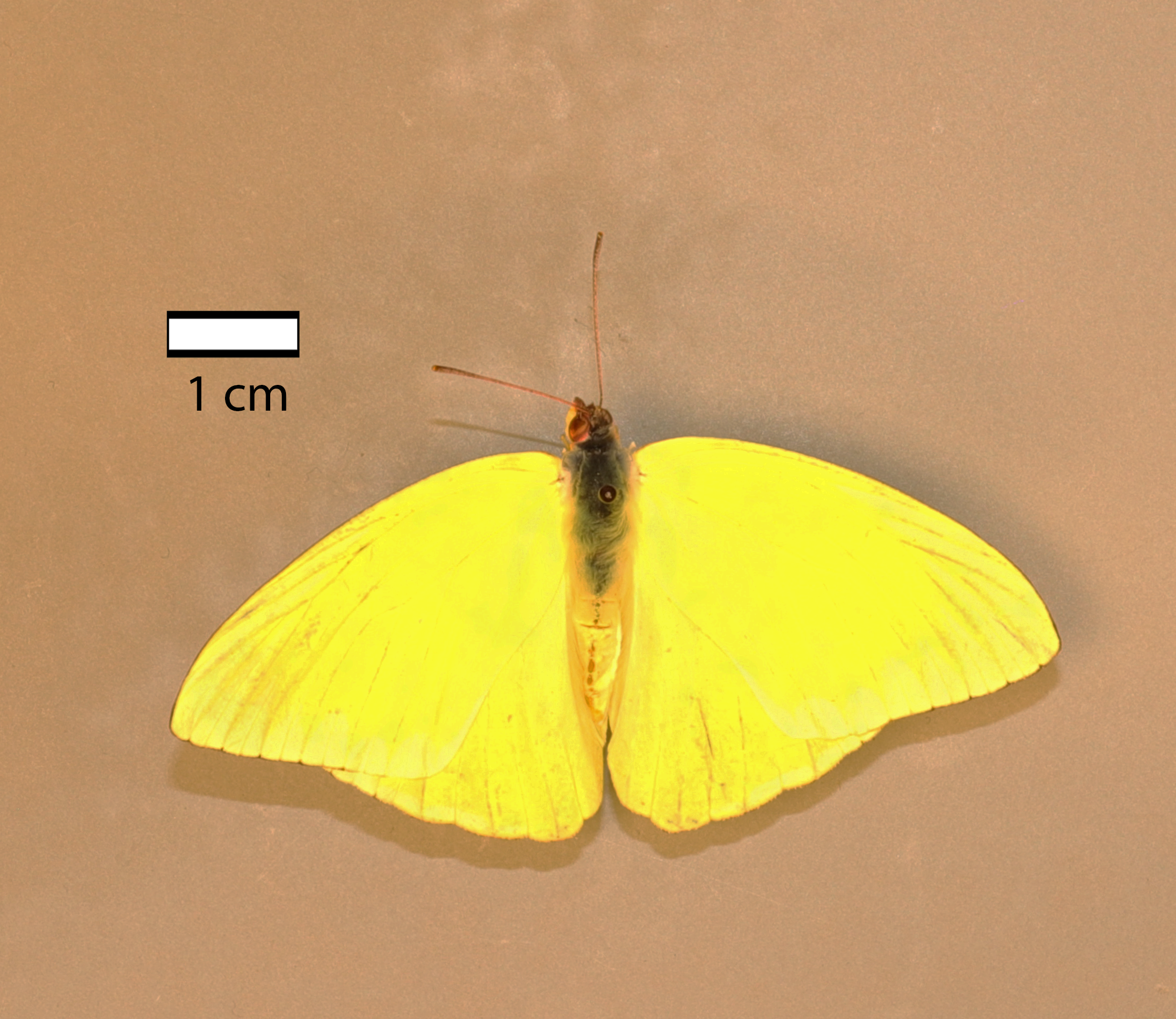
Pinned Cloudless Sulphur, collected in Saint Simons Island, Georgia

== Habitat ==
The common habitats of this butterfly are open spaces, gardens, glades, seashores, and watercourses.

== Diet ==
The adult butterfly feeds on nectar from many different flowers with long tubes including cordia, bougainvillea, cardinal flower, hibiscus, lantana, and wild morning glory. The larvae also feed on sennas and partridge peas.

Senna hebecarpa (American senna) is a larval host and nectar source for the cloudless sulphur butterfly in the Eastern United States.

== Life cycle ==
The breeding season is dependent on the climate of the area, from midsummer to fall in the cooler areas, to year-round where the climate is warmer.

=== Egg ===
The cloudless sulphur starts off as a pitcher-shaped white egg. Eventually it will turn to a pale orange. The egg stage lasts six days.

=== Caterpillar ===
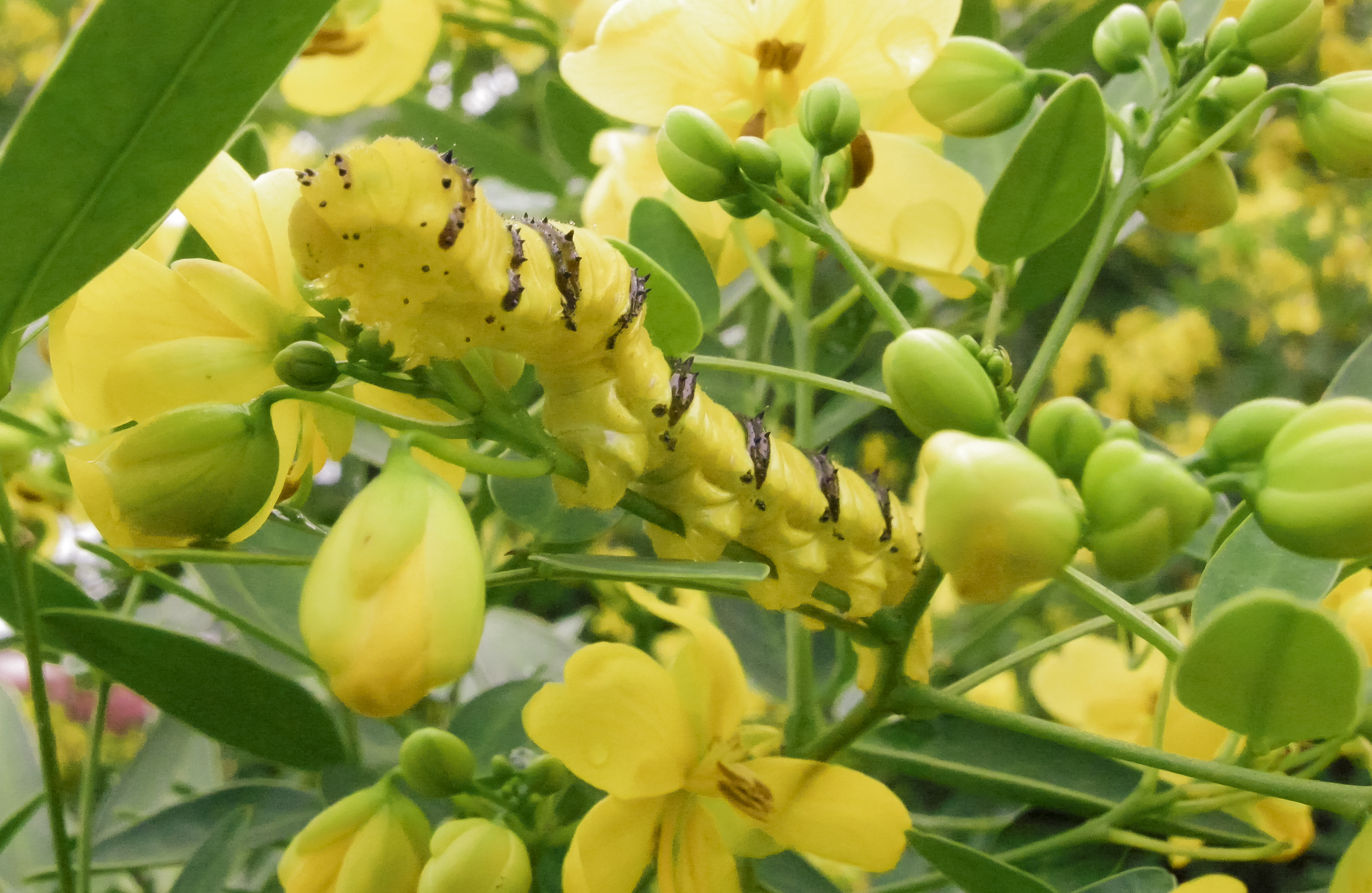
Cloudless sulfur caterpillar (Phoebis sennae) eating yellow buttercup bush (Senna corymbosa)

Once the egg hatches, a caterpillar emerges that is yellow to greenish, striped on sides, with black dots in rows across the back. The host plant may be sensitive peas (Chamaecrista), sennas (Senna), clovers (Trifolium), or other legumes (Fabaceae). The caterpillar will usually grow to a length between 41 and 45 mm (1.6 and 1.8 in).

=== Chrysalis ===
The caterpillar will form a chrysalis that is pointed at both ends and humped in the middle. The chrysalis will be either yellow or green with pink or green stripes. From the chrysalis comes a medium-sized butterfly (55–70 mm (2.2–2.8 in)) with fairly elongated but not angled wings.

=== Adult ===
The male butterfly is clear yellow above and yellow or mottled with reddish brown below and the female is lemon yellow to golden or white on both surfaces, with varying amounts of black spotting along the margin and a black open square or star on the bottom forewing. Wing spans range from 4.8 to 6.5 cm (approximately 1.9

to 2.6 in).

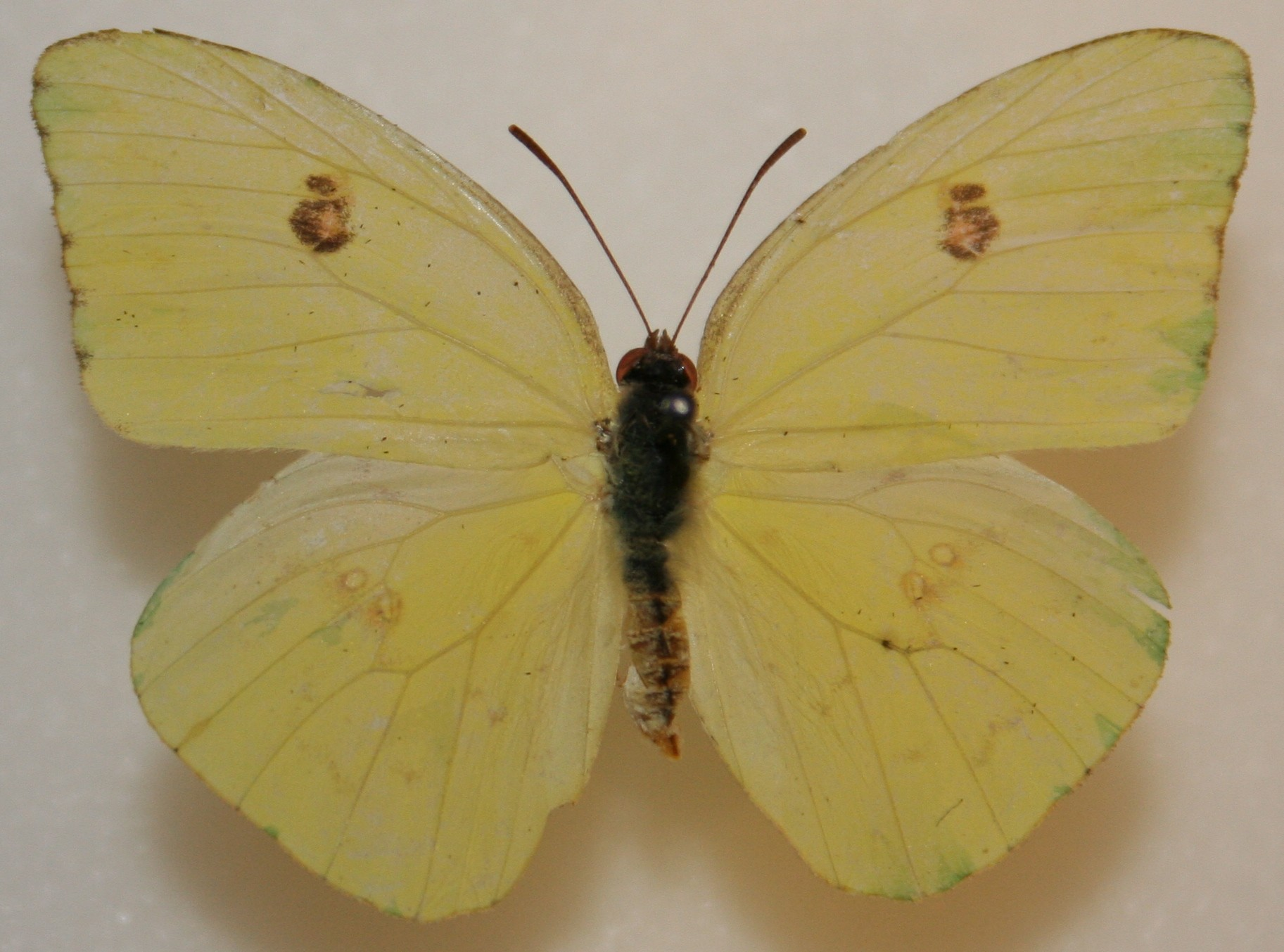
Female

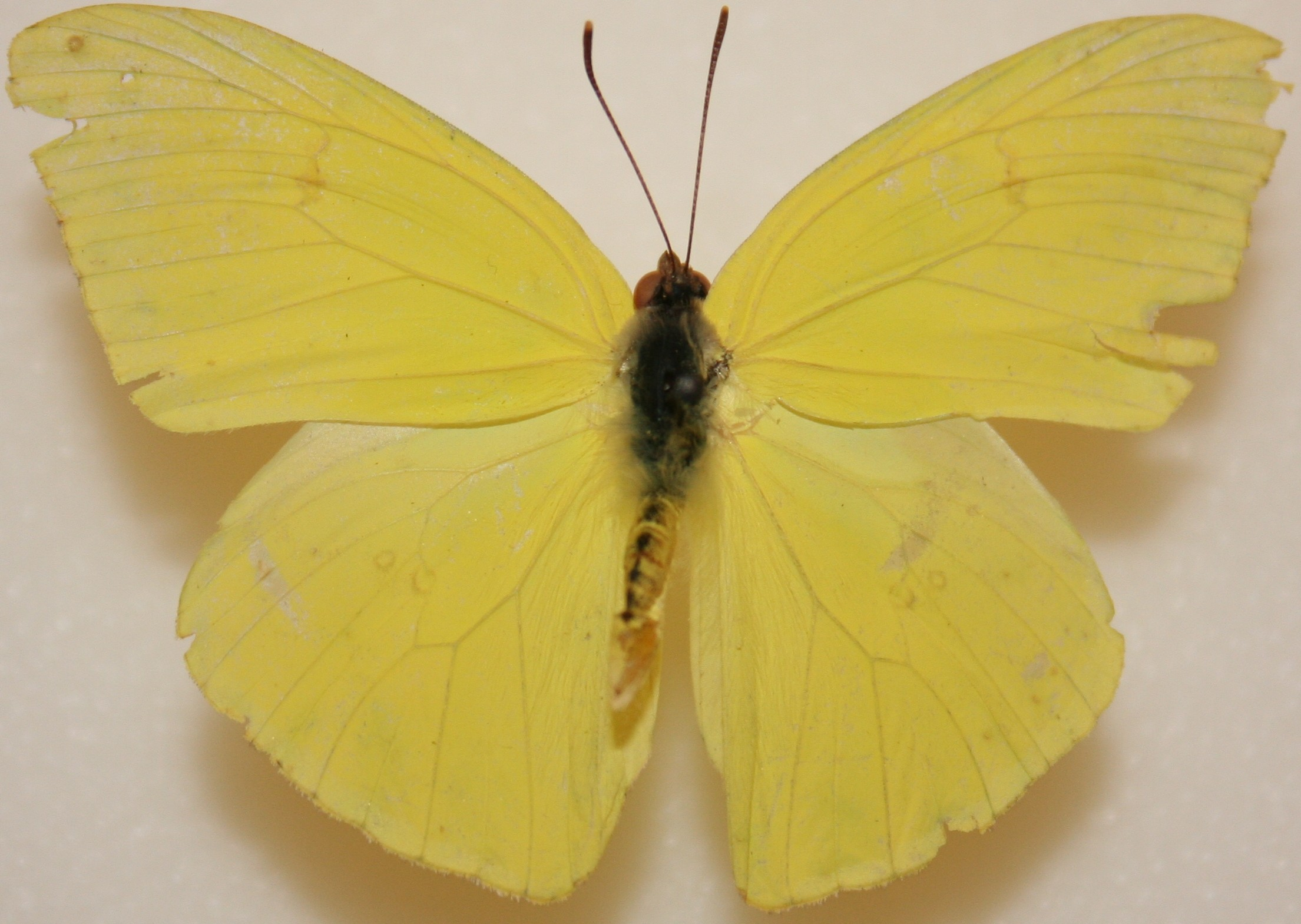
Male

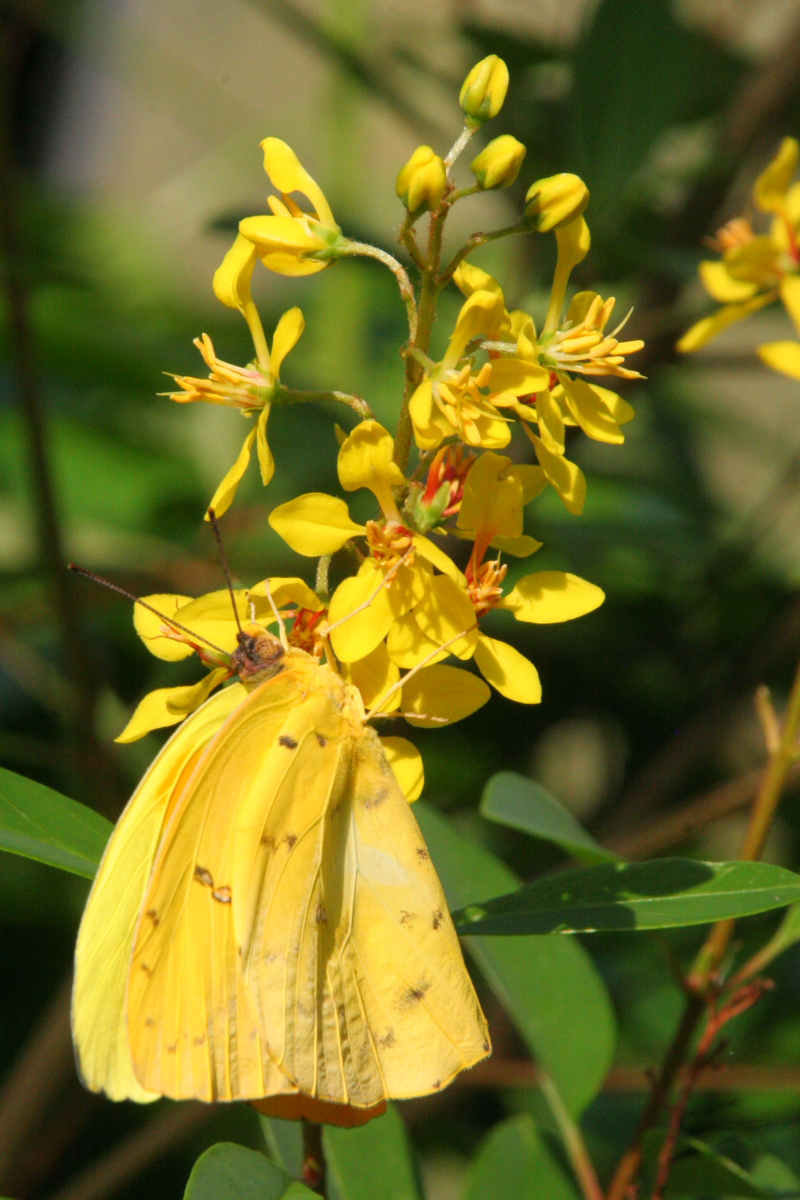
Monsanto Insectarium, St. Louis Zoo

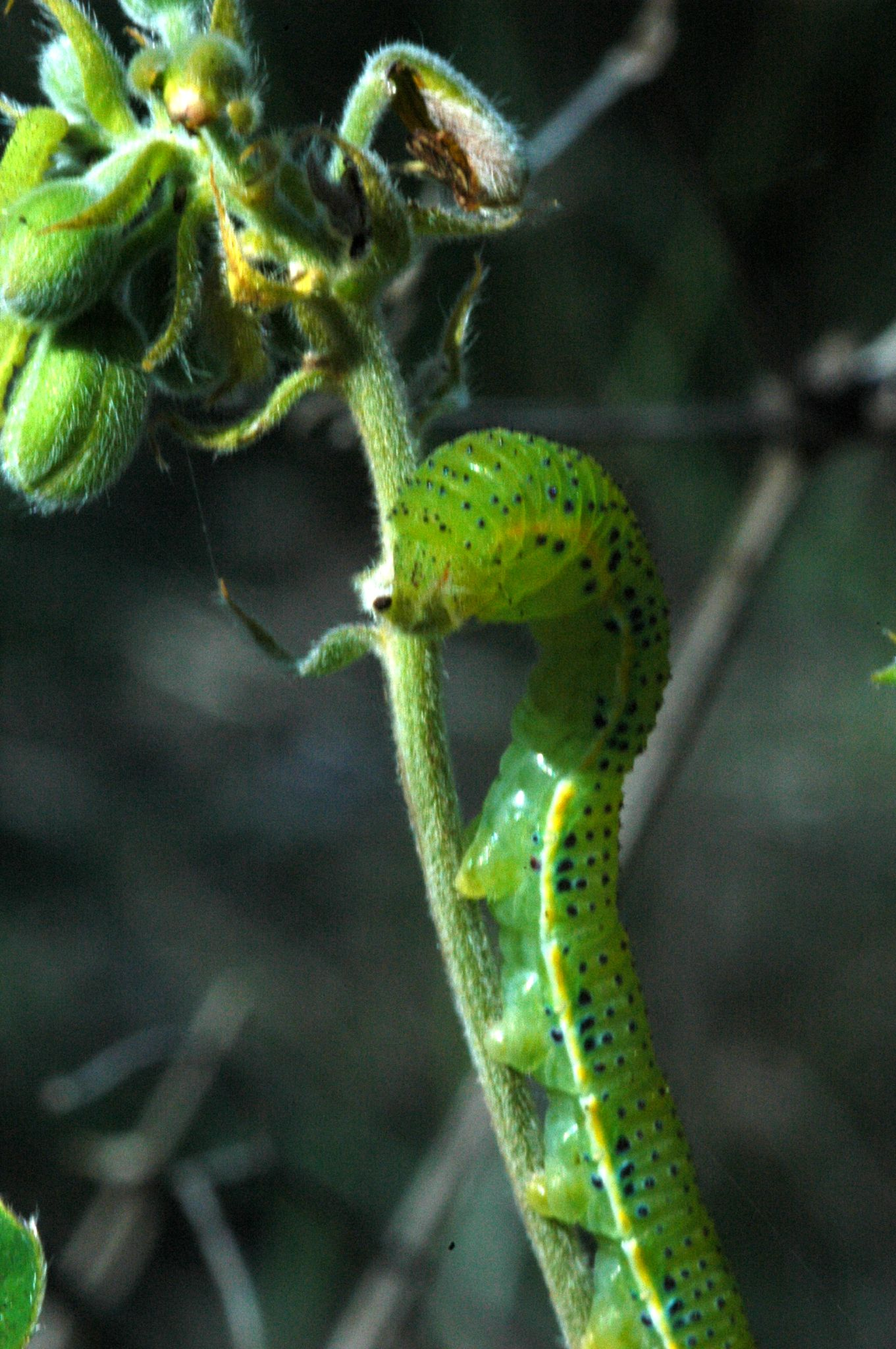
Caterpillar

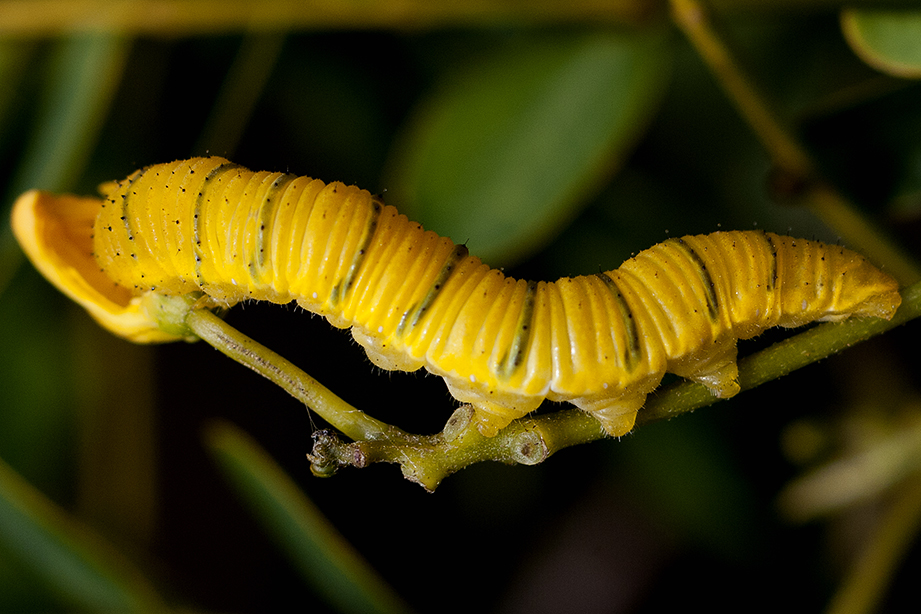
Yellow version of caterpillar feeding on senna tree, Vista, California

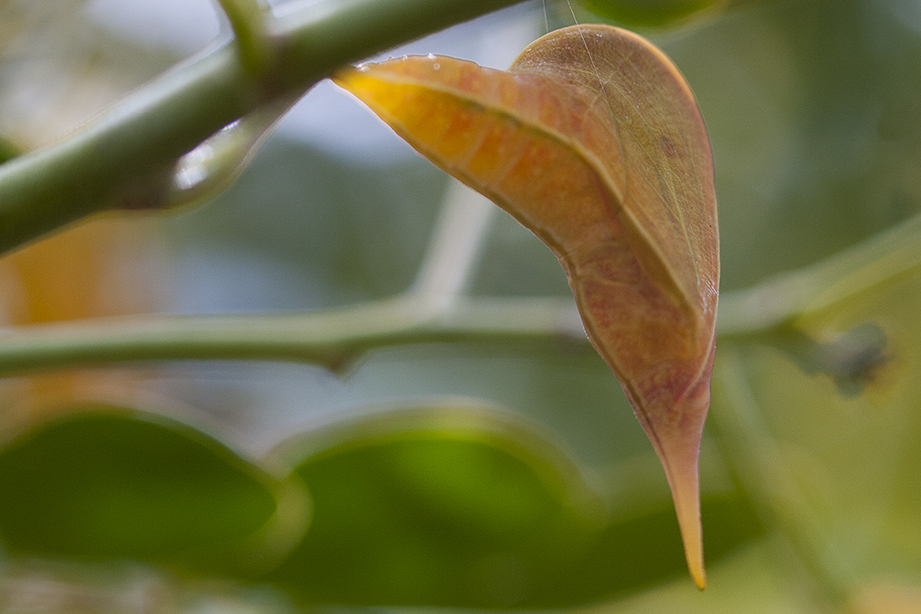
Chrysalis on senna tree, Vista, California

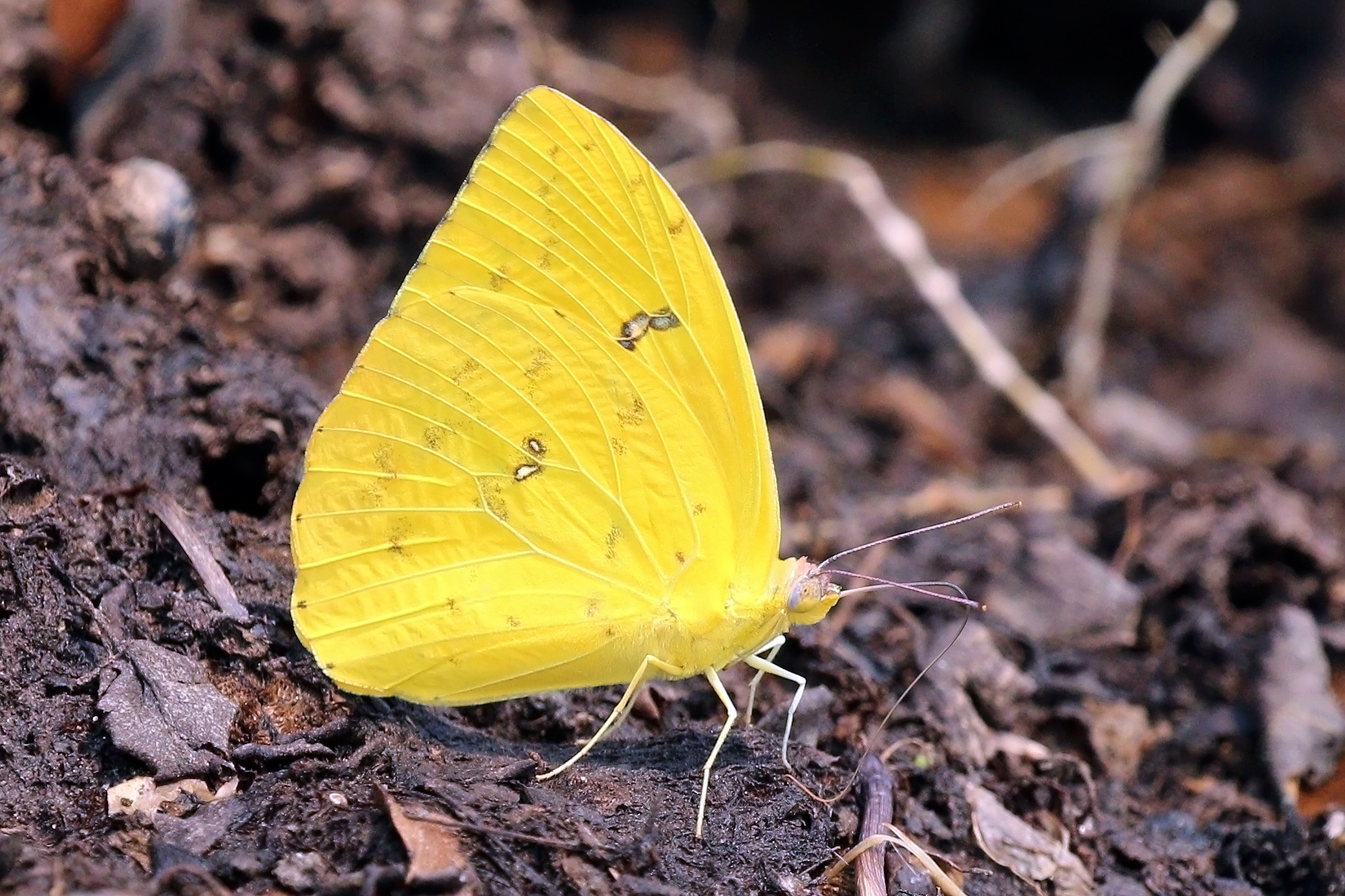
Male P. s. marcellina
in the Pantanal, Brazil

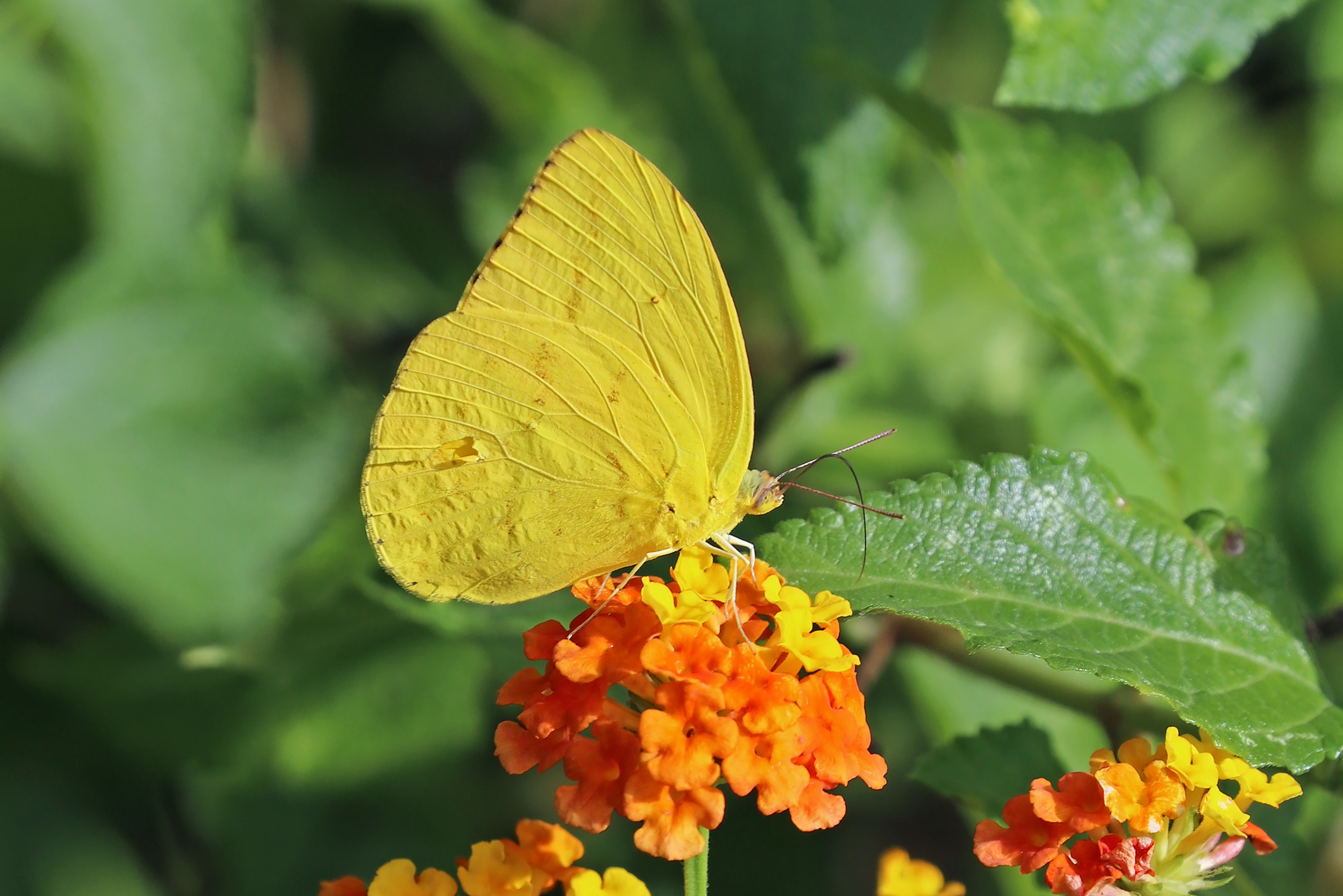
Male P. s. marcellina
in Panama, some males are unmarked

Female ovipositing on senna plant

Larva, its yellow color helps camouflage it under a senna flower.

== Subspecies ==
Listed alphabetically:

- P. s. amphitrite (Feisthamel, 1839) – Chile
- P. s. sennae or P. s. eubule – Jamaica, South Carolina, Kansas, Virginia, Florida, Cuba

=== Former subspecies ===
- P. s. marcellina (Cramer, [1779]) – Mexico, Uruguay, Galapagos, Suriname, Honduras, Brazil, Argentina, Bolivia, Peru - elevated to full species status as Phoebis marcellina in 2020
