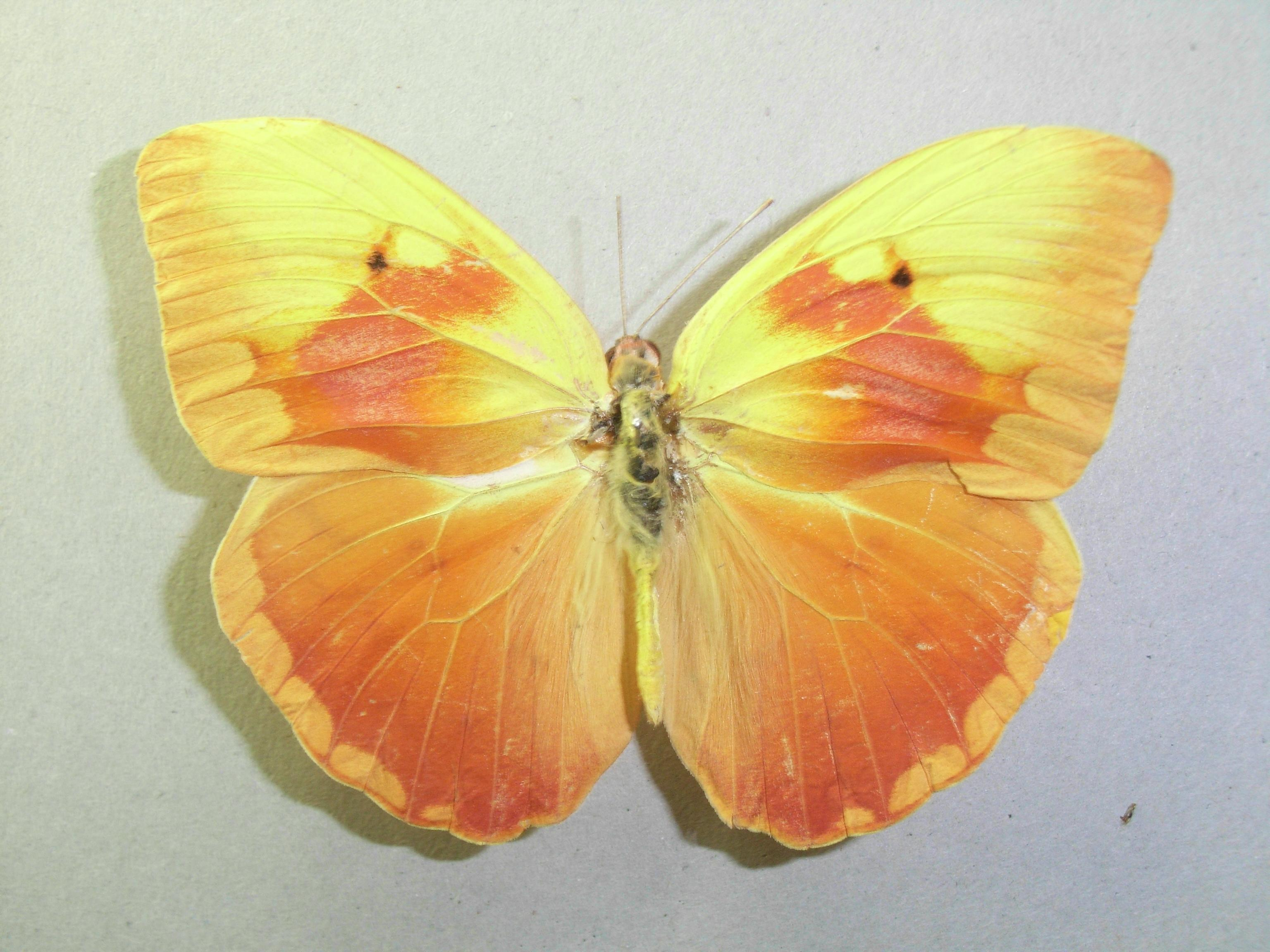

Scientific classification
- Kingdom: Animalia
- Phylum: Arthropoda
- Class: Insecta
- Order: Lepidoptera
- Family: Pieridae
- Genus: Phoebis
- Species: P. avellaneda

Binomial name
- Phoebis avellaneda (Herrich-Schäffer, 1865)

= Phoebis avellaneda =

Red-splashed sulphur

Species of butterfly

Phoebis avellaneda, the red-splashed sulphur or also known as the orange-washed sulphur, is a large, striking yellow butterfly in the family Pieridae. It is an endemic species found only in Cuba.

P. avellanada was named to honour the Cuban writer Gertrudis Gómez de Avellaneda. The insect is rare in collections. The butterfly is depicted on two Cuban postage stamps; issues of 1982 20c and 1984 1c.
