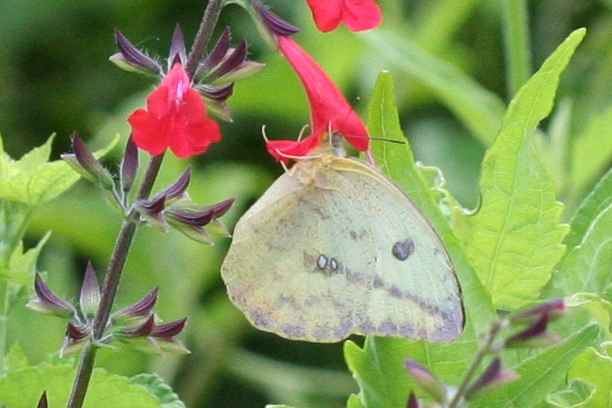
- Female
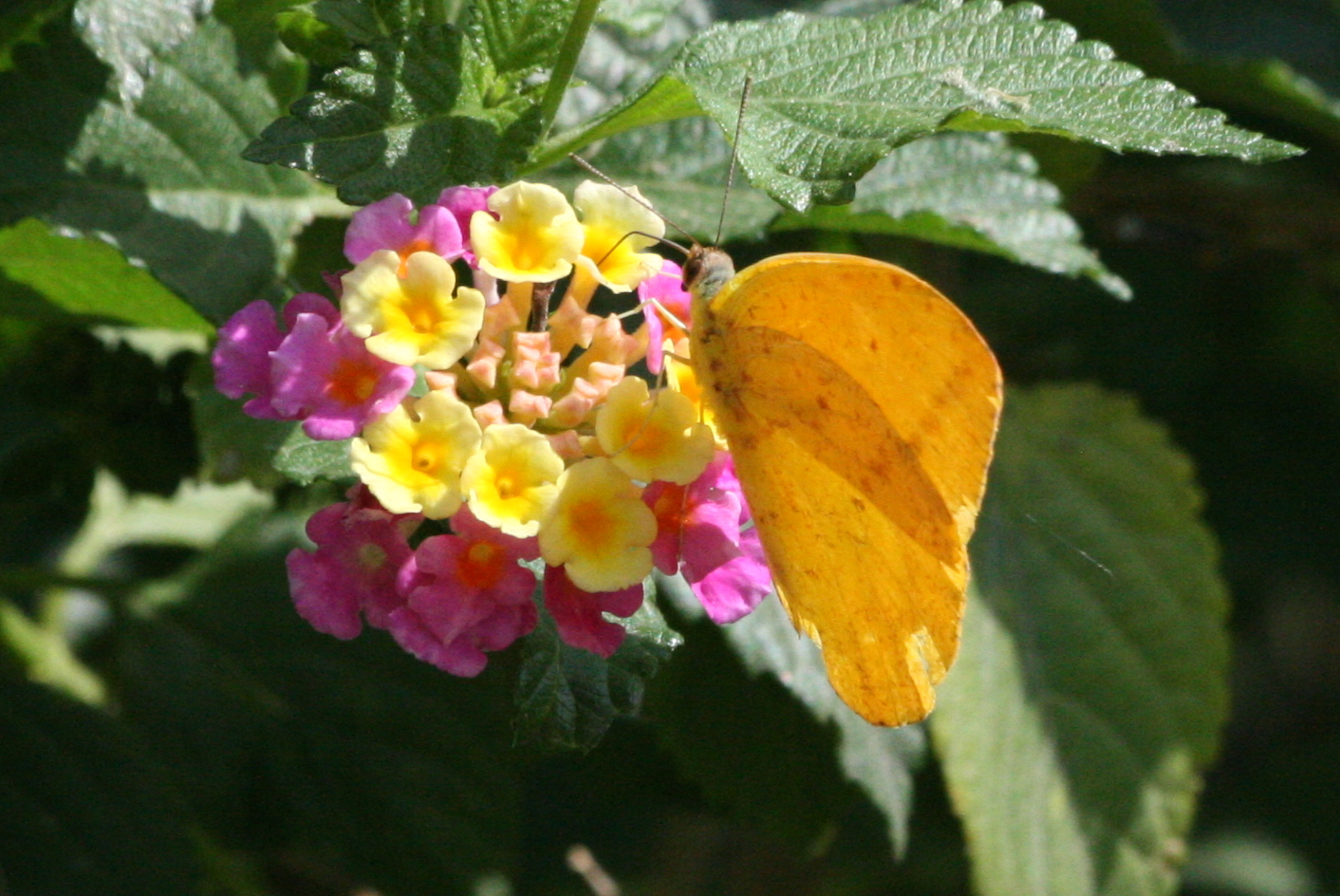
- Male

Conservation status
- Secure (NatureServe)

Scientific classification
- Kingdom: Animalia
- Phylum: Arthropoda
- Clade: Pancrustacea
- Class: Insecta
- Order: Lepidoptera
- Family: Pieridae
- Genus: Phoebis
- Species: P. agarithe

Binomial name
- Phoebis agarithe (Boisduval, [1836])

Synonyms
- Callidryas agarithe Boisduval, [1836]; Catopsilia arganie floridiensis Röber, 1909 (preocc. Neumoegen, 1891)

= Phoebis agarithe =

Species of butterfly

Phoebis agarithe, the large orange sulphur, is a butterfly in the family Pieridae. It is found from Peru north to southern Texas and peninsular Florida. Rare strays can be found up to Colorado, South Dakota, Wisconsin, and New Jersey. The species has also been introduced in Hawaii. The habitat consists of open, tropical lowlands including gardens, pastures, road edges, trails and parks.

The wingspan is 57–86 mm (2.2–3.4 in). Adults are on wing from August to September in southern Texas and all year round in the tropics. They feed on flower nectar, favoring lantana, shepherd's needle, bougainvillea, rose periwinkle, Turk's cap and hibiscus.

The larvae feed on fresh leaves of Pithecellobium and Inga species.

== Subspecies ==
The following subspecies are recognised:

- Phoebis agarithe agarithe (Texas, Mexico)
- Phoebis agarithe fischeri (H. Edwards, 1883) (Baja California)
- Phoebis agarithe maxima (Neumoegen, 1891) (Florida)
- Phoebis agarithe antillia Brown, 1929 (Haiti)
- Phoebis agarithe pupillata Dillon, 1947 (Dominica)
- Phoebis agarithe tumbesina Lamas, 1981 (Peru)
