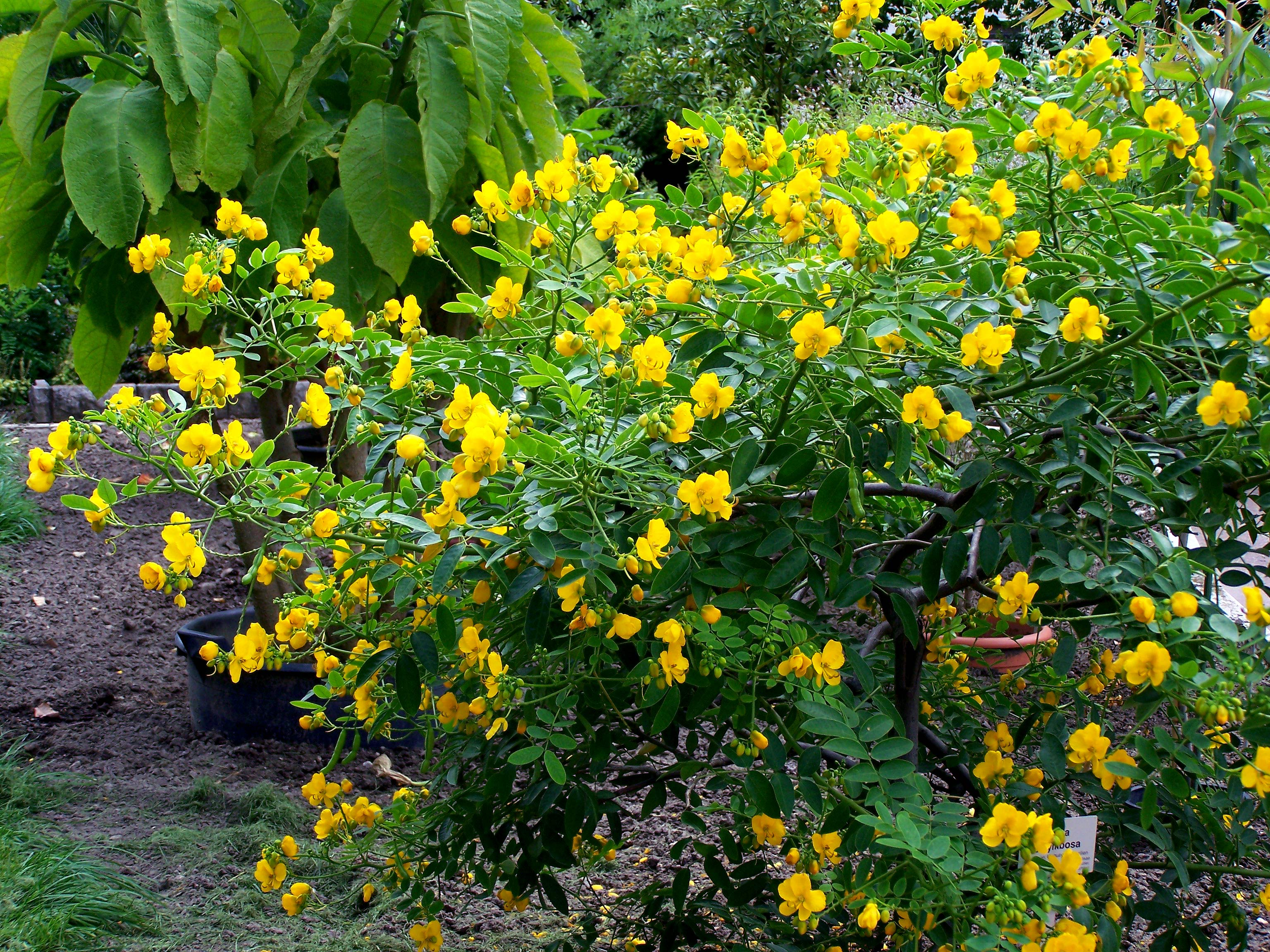
- Senna corymbosa in bloom

Scientific classification
- Kingdom: Plantae
- Clade: Tracheophytes
- Clade: Angiosperms
- Clade: Eudicots
- Clade: Rosids
- Order: Fabales
- Family: Fabaceae
- Subfamily: Caesalpinioideae
- Genus: Senna
- Species: S. corymbosa

Binomial name
- Senna corymbosa (Lam.) H.S.Irwin & Barneby

Synonyms
- See text

= Senna corymbosa =

Species of legume

Senna corymbosa is an ornamental plant in the genus Senna. It is also known as Argentine senna, Argentina senna, buttercup bush, flowering senna, Texas flowery senna or tree senna.

== Description ==
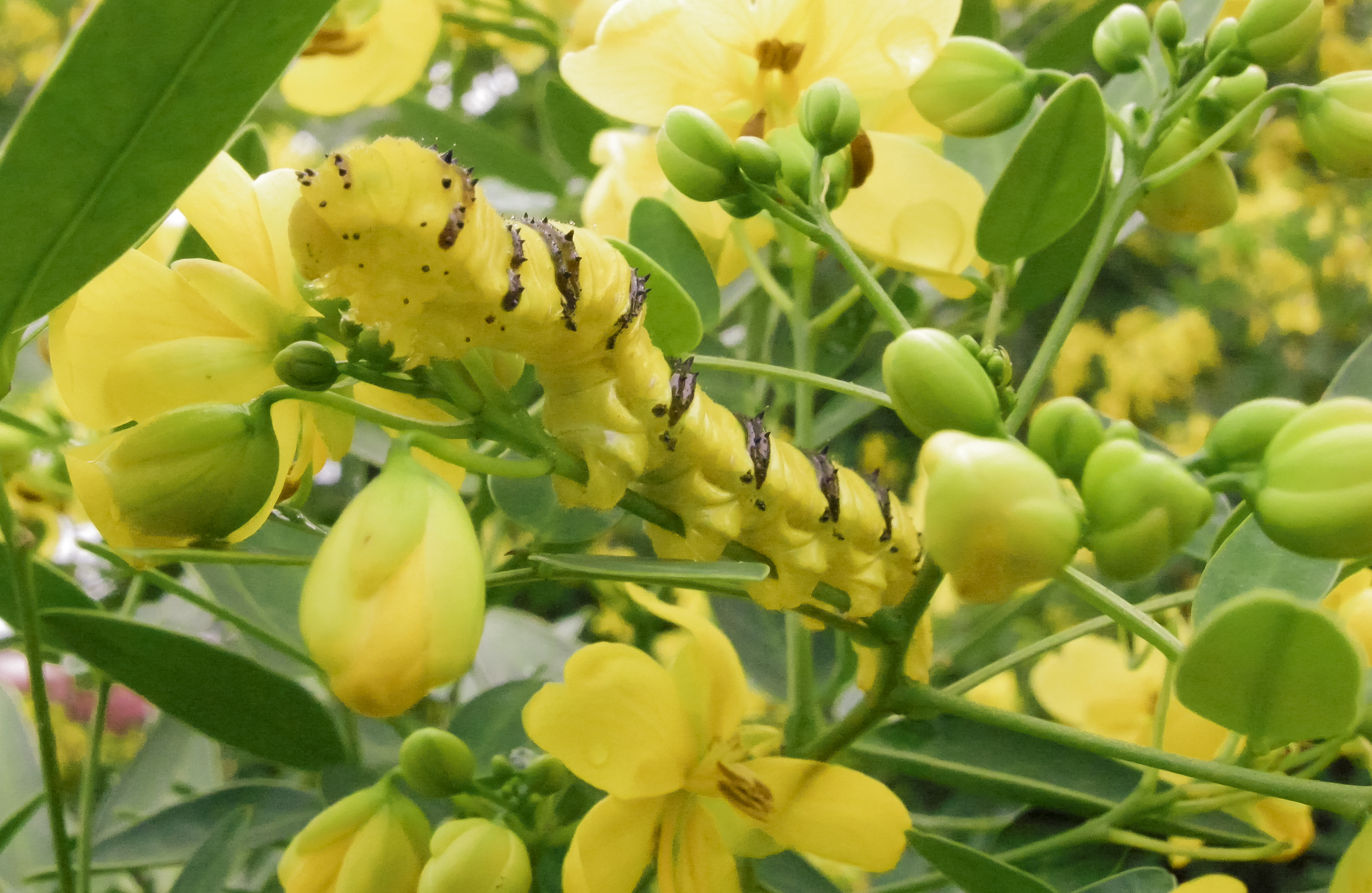
Cloudless Sulfur Caterpillar (Phoebis sennae) eating yellow buttercup bush flowers (Senna corymbosa)

This evergreen shrub reaches a height of about one meter. It can be grown in temperate climates as it is somewhat frost-hardy.

In the Northern Hemisphere, it flowers in July. The flowers fold in the shade and at night. The flowers are yellow, with 5 sepals and sub-equal petals, 10 very unequal etamins in 3 groups [3-4-3] and a style very curved upwards. It blooms in summer and autumn and is visited by bumblebees, which are responsible for its pollination. The fruit is a hanging indehiscent legume, cylindrical in shape (about 6 to 10 cm) full of seeds.

== Distribution and habitat ==
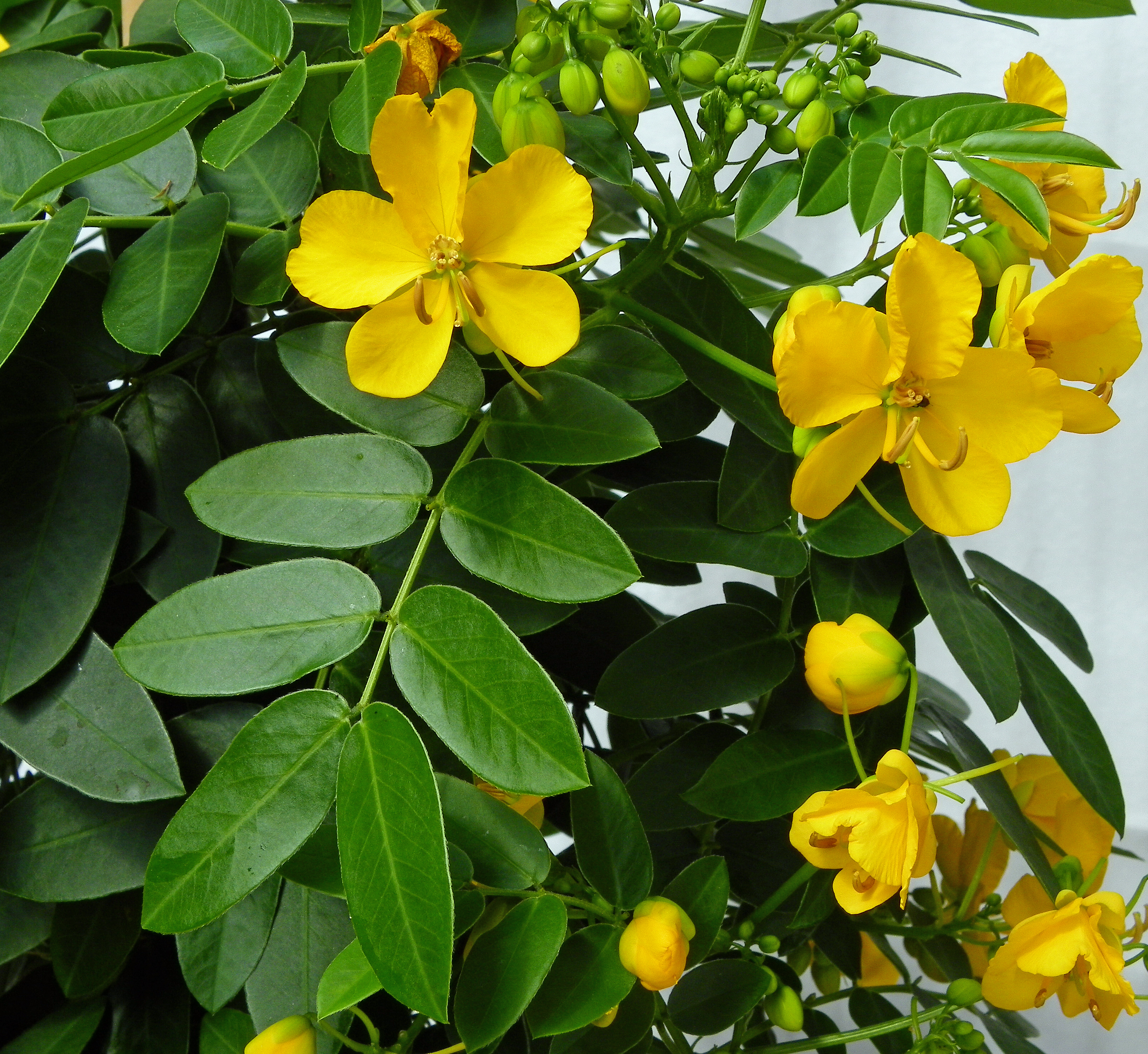
Leaves and flowers

It is distributed, from sea level to about 200 m above sea level, in all the departments of Uruguay; in southern Brazil in the states of Rio Grande do Sul and Santa Catarina; in Paraguay; and in eastern Argentina, in the provinces of La Pampa, Córdoba, Santa Fe, Misiones, Corrientes, Entre Ríos, and Buenos Aires, reaching as far south as the outskirts of Mar del Plata. It is found wild in the province of Tucumán. It inhabits wetlands, riverbanks and mountain edges.

It has been introduced in Alabama, Canary Island, Cape Provinces, Florida, Georgia, India, Iraq, Italy, KwaZulu-Natal, Louisiana, Mississippi, Northern Provinces, Pakistan, South Carolina, Spain and Texas.

== Synonyms ==
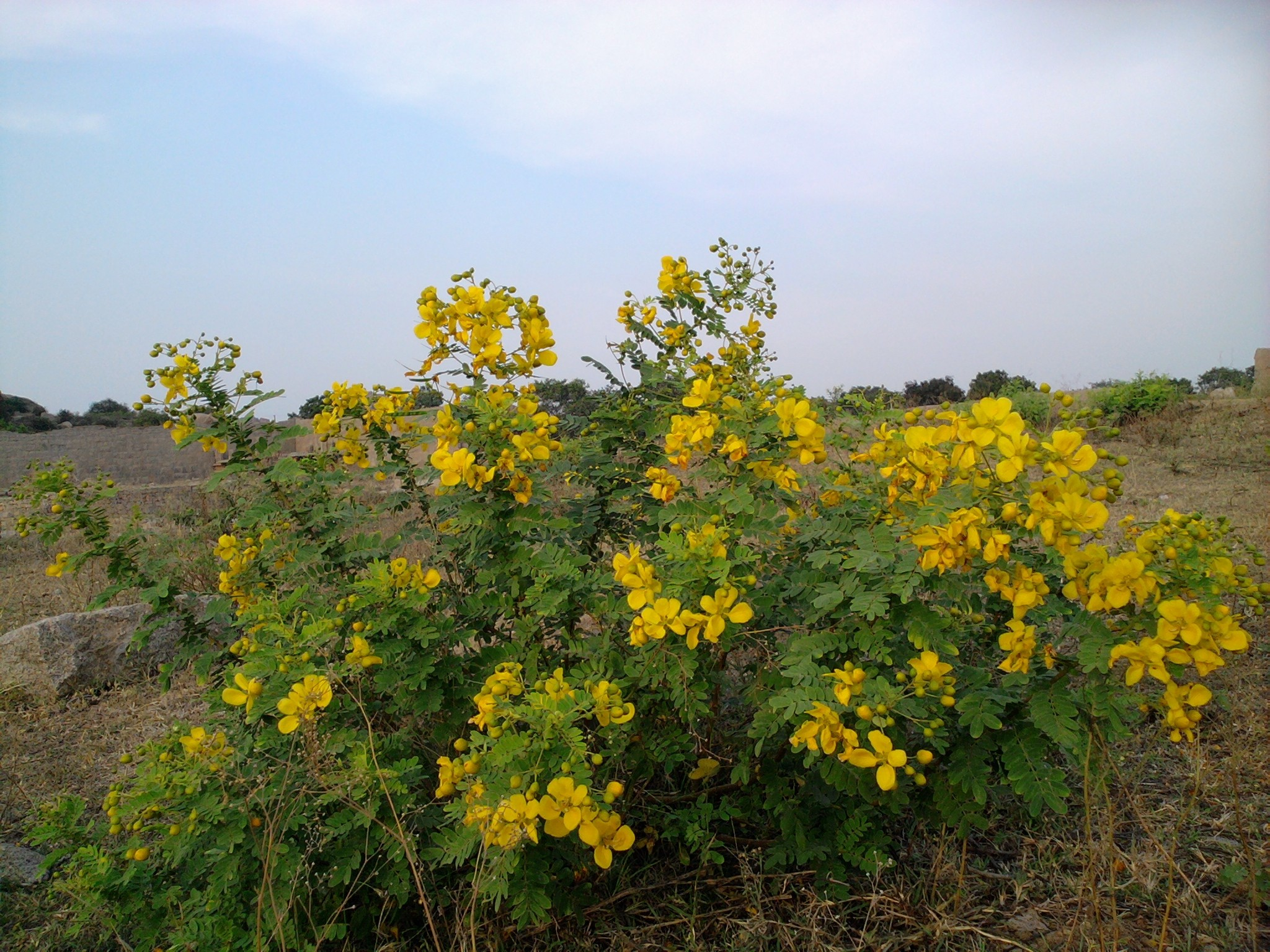
Grown in wasteland

Synonyms:

- Adipera corymbosa (Lam.) Britton & Rose
- Cassia corymbosa Lam.
- Cassia crassifolia Ortega
- Cassia falcata Dum. Cours.

Cassia falcata L. is a synonym of Senna occidentalis

- Chamaefistula corymbosa (Lam.) G.Don
