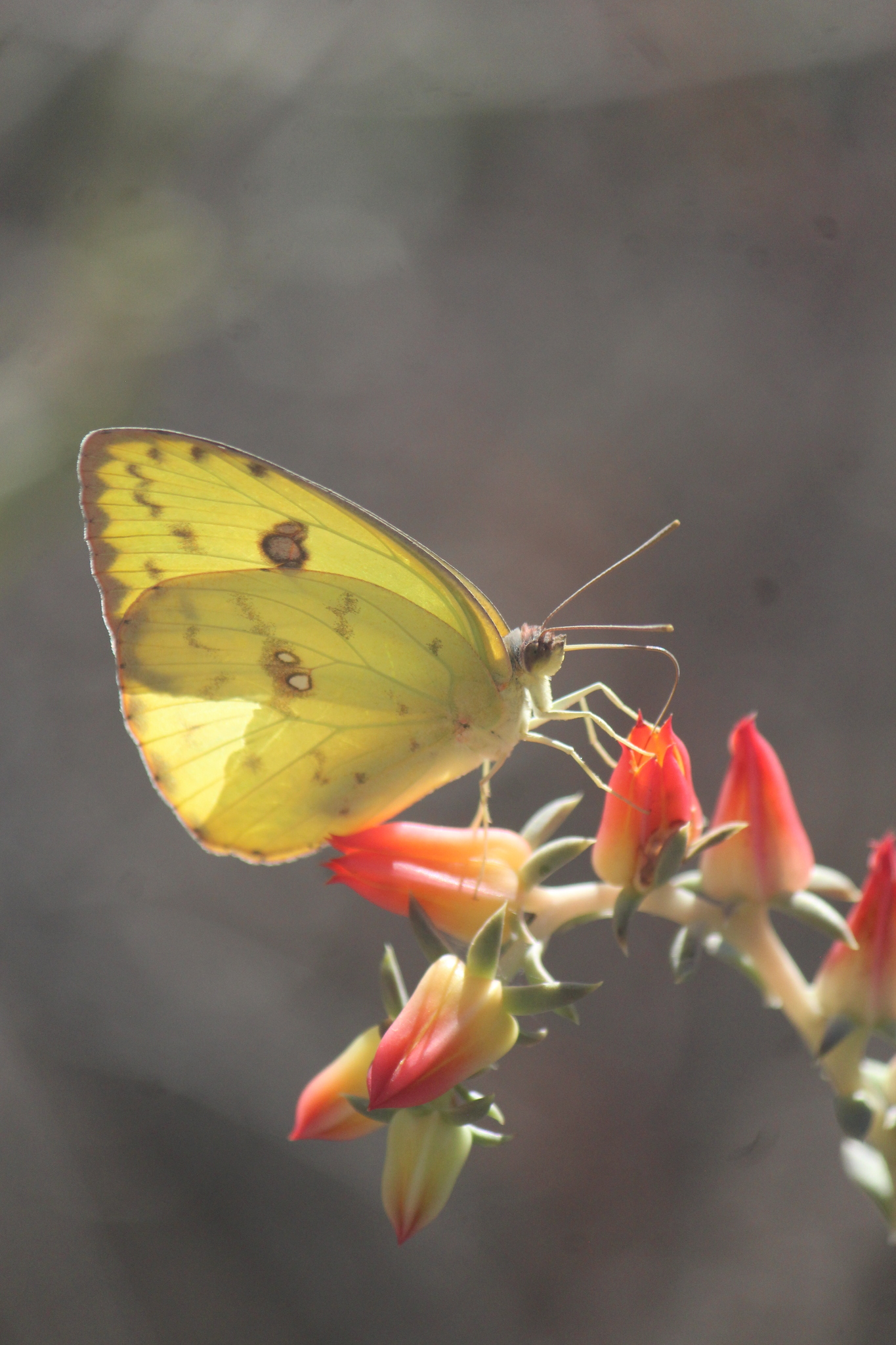

Scientific classification
- Kingdom: Animalia
- Phylum: Arthropoda
- Clade: Pancrustacea
- Class: Insecta
- Order: Lepidoptera
- Family: Pieridae
- Genus: Phoebis
- Species: P. marcellina

Binomial name
- Phoebis marcellina (Cramer, 1779)

= Phoebis marcellina =

Species of butterfly

Phoebis marcellina is a species of butterfly found in the Western Hemisphere between roughly the latitudes of 34° N and 30° S (meaning from Los Angeles to northern Argentina, approximately). Previously considered a subspecies of Phoebis sennae, the marcellina sulphur was elevated to full species status in 2020 after "recent pierid DNA barcode studies across the Neotropics" found more species diversity than had been previously recognized.
