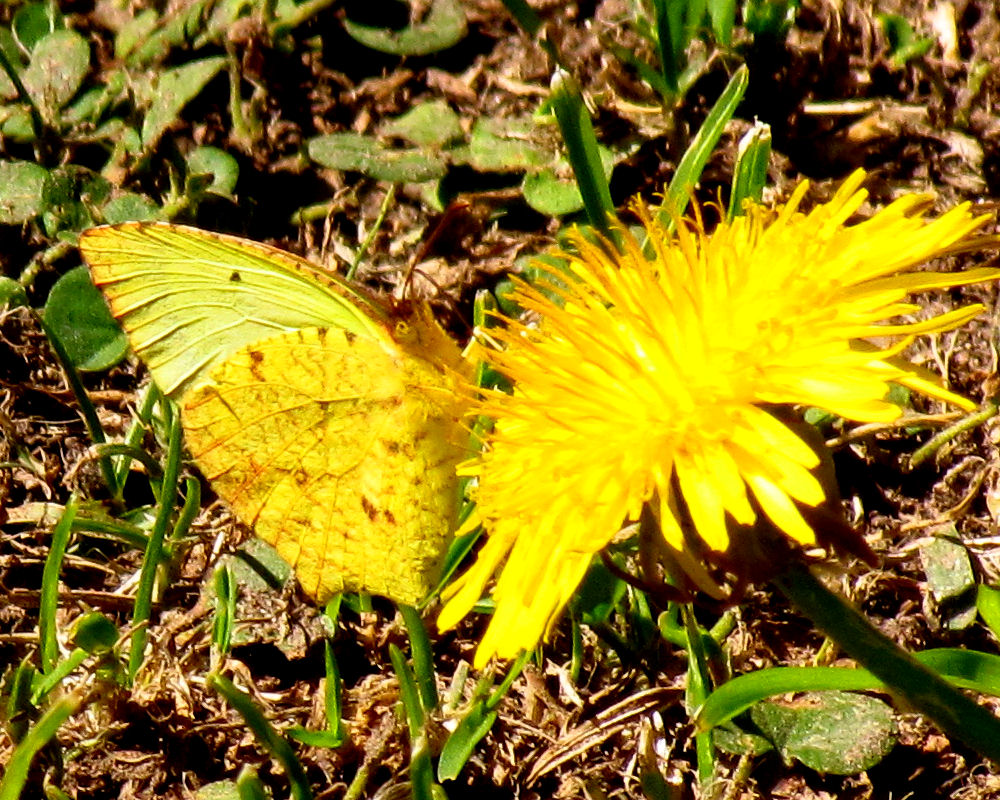

Scientific classification
- Kingdom: Animalia
- Phylum: Arthropoda
- Clade: Pancrustacea
- Class: Insecta
- Order: Lepidoptera
- Family: Pieridae
- Genus: Phoebis
- Species: P. neocypris

Binomial name
- Phoebis neocypris (Hübner, [1823])

Synonyms
- Colias neocypris Hübner, [1823]; Papilio cipris Fabricius, 1793 (preocc. Cramer, 1777); Callidryas bracteolata Butler, 1865; Callidryas irrigata Butler, 1870; Callidryas rurina C. & R. Felder, 1861; Callidryas bogotana Herrich-Schäffer, 1867 (nom. nud.); Catopsilia rurina ab. peruvicola Strand, 1912; Catopsilia rurina ab. impurpurissata Niepelt, 1914; Catopsilia neocypris peruviana Martin, [1923] (nom. nud.); Callidryas virgo Butler, 1870; Callidryas intermedia Butler, 1872; Callidryas intermedia f. rubrofasciata Vázquez, 1952

= Phoebis neocypris =

tailed sulphur

Species of butterfly

Phoebis neocypris, the tailed sulphur, is a butterfly in the family Pieridae. It is native to Mexico, Central America, and South America. There is a record for one stray in southern Texas.

The larvae feed on fresh leaves of Cassia species.

== Subspecies ==
The following subspecies are recognised:

- Phoebis neocypris neocypris (Brazil)
- Phoebis neocypris rurina C. & R. Felder, 1861 (Mexico to Brazil, Venezuela, Colombia, Peru, Ecuador)
- Phoebis neocypris virgo (Butler, 1870) (Mexico, Guatemala, Costa Rica)
