= Bayer Insectarium =

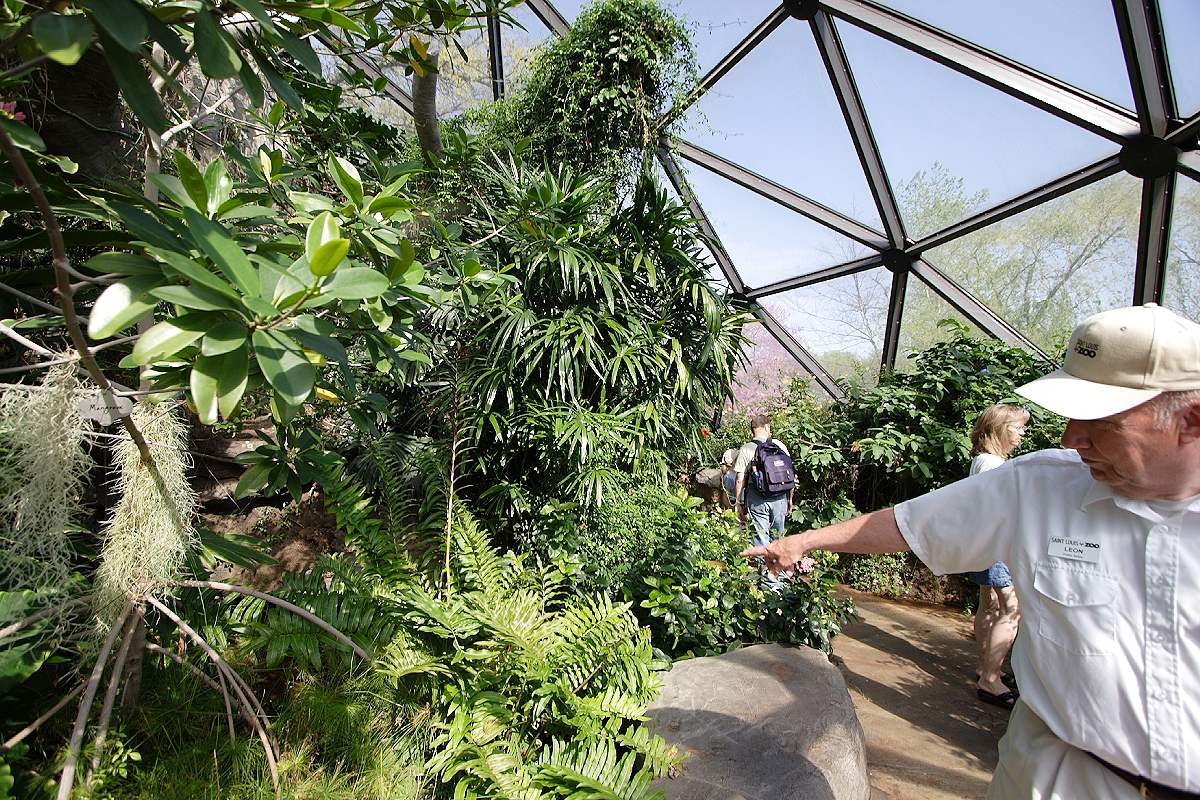
- Inside the insectarium
- Interactive map of Bayer Insectarium
- 38.6349°N 90.2919°W
- Date opened: 2000
- Location: St. Louis, Missouri, United States
- Memberships: AZA
- Public transit: MetroBus
- Website: stlzoo.org/zones/discovery-corner/insectarium

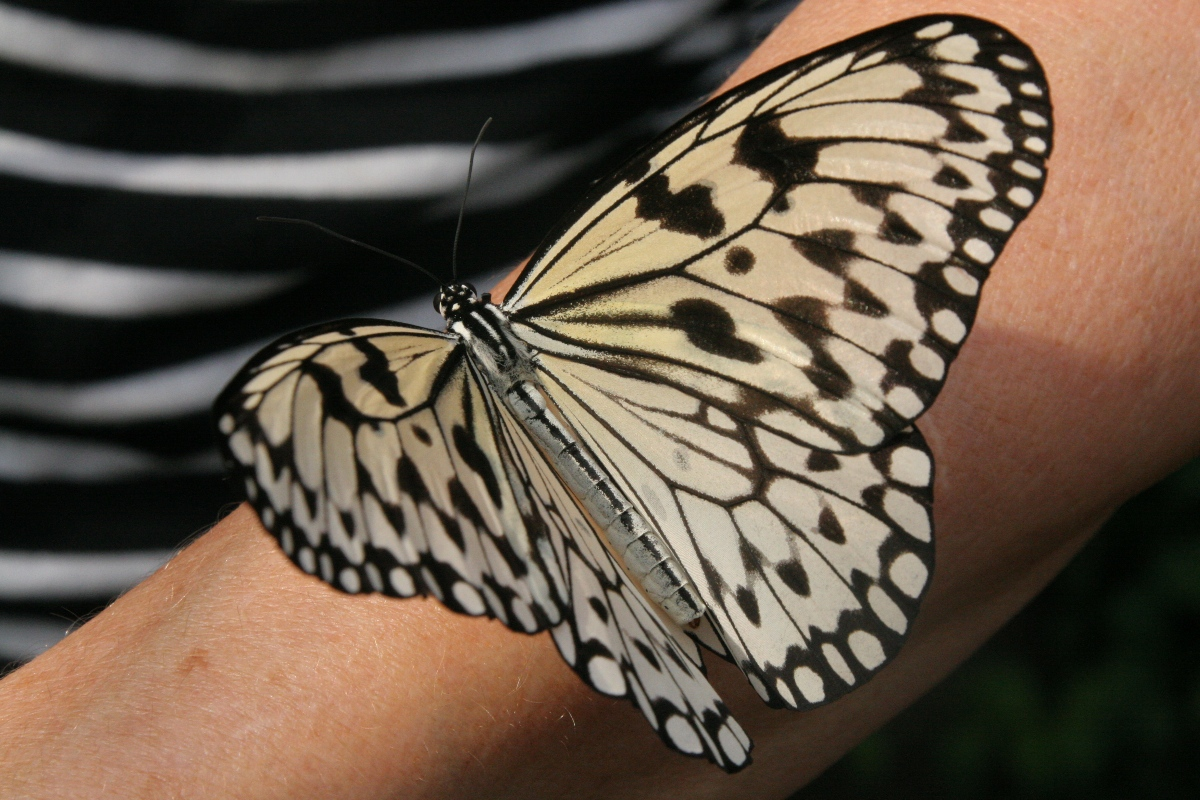
Paper kite, Monsanto Insectarium

The Bayer Insectarium is an insectarium located within the Saint Louis Zoo in St. Louis, Missouri, United States. Having opened in 2000 and designed by David Mason & Associates with a cost of $4 million, this 9,000 square feet (840 m^{2}) facility houses educational exhibits and an active breeding and research facility. It also includes a window to the exhibits area and two-way communications so visitors may watch entomologists work and ask them questions. The facility even includes a geodesic flight dome cage, which is home to numerous rainforest flowers and butterfly species.

The Bayer Insectarium is open every day except Christmas and New Years days. Admission to the zoo and the insectarium is free.

== Butterfly collection ==
The insectarium includes a tropical garden and pollinarium. The gallery (below) illustrates a few specimens from the pollinarium's collection.

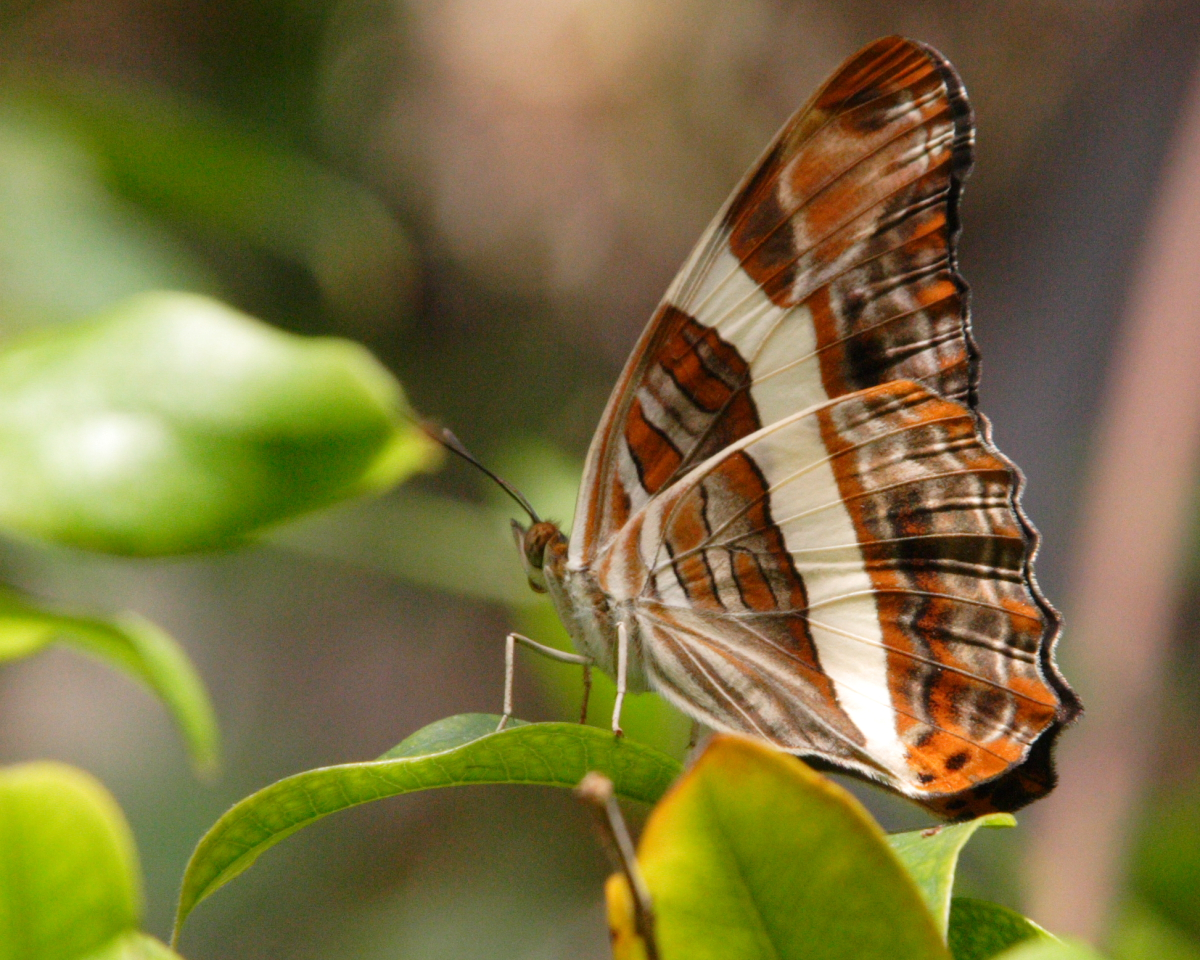
Adelpha fessonia
Mexican sister, underside

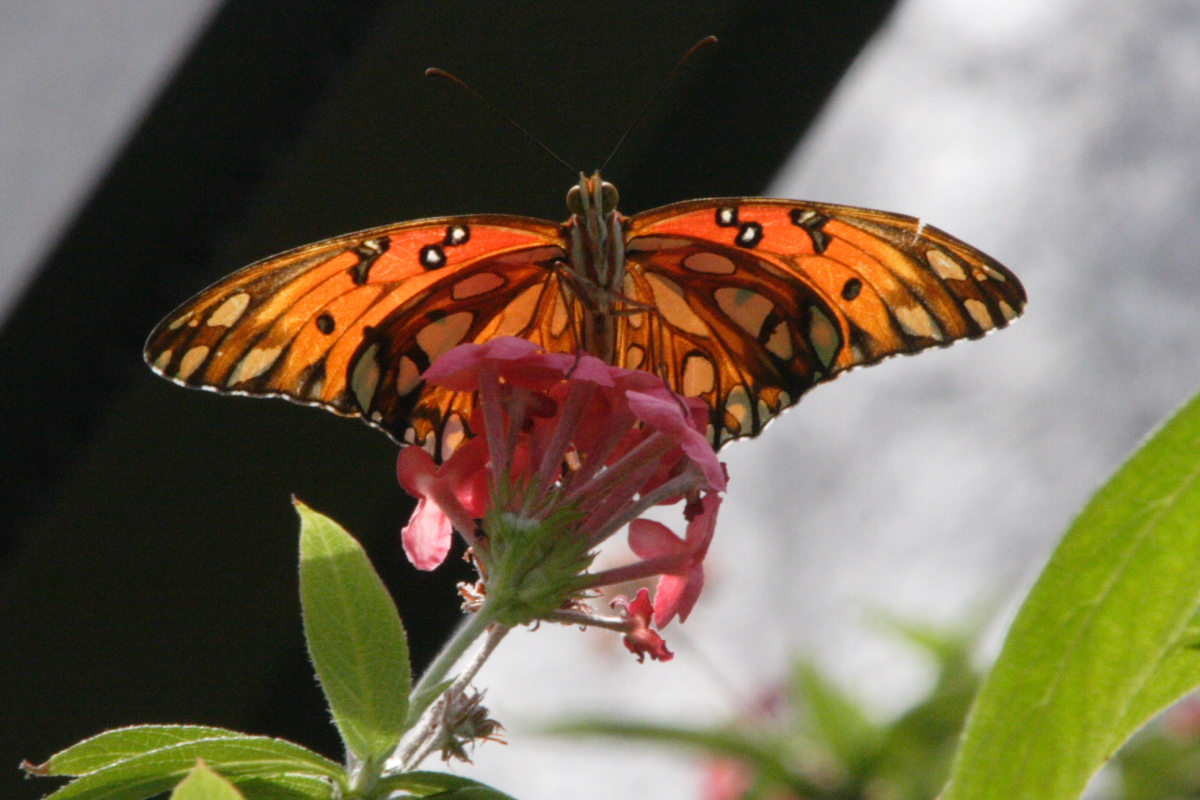
Agraulis vanillae
Gulf fritillary

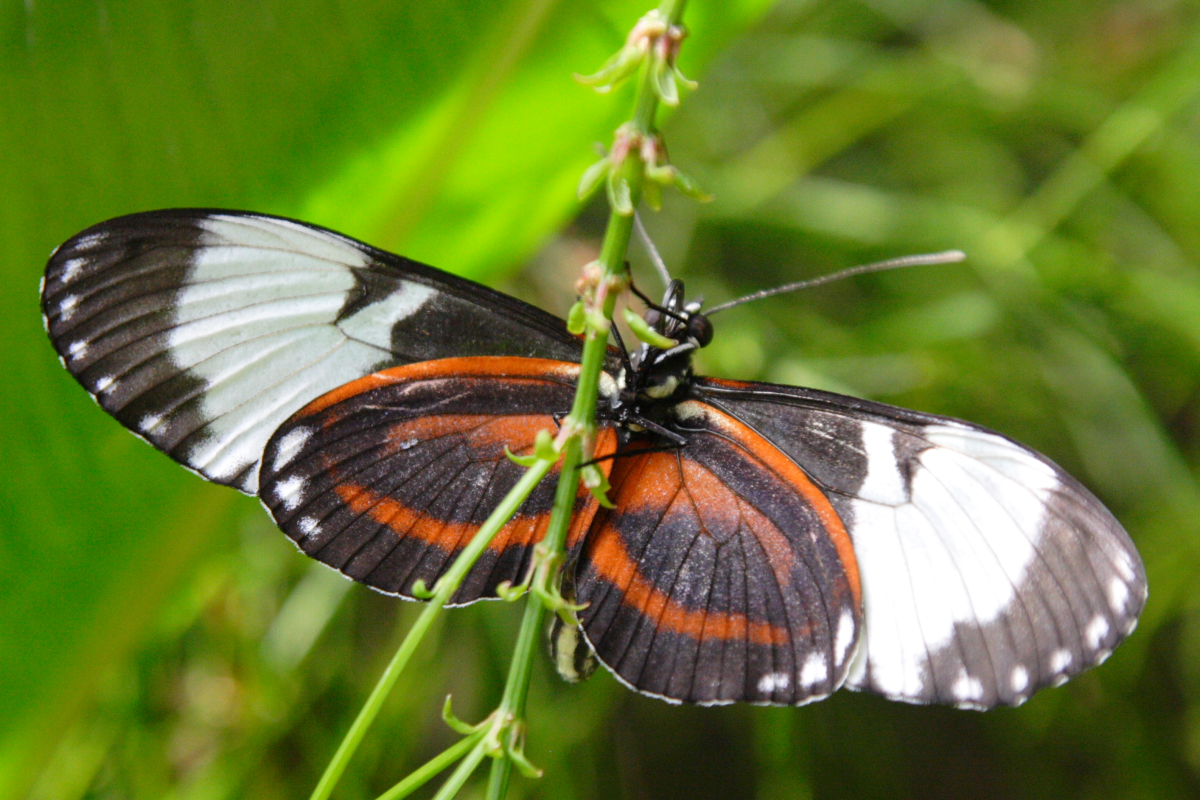
Heliconius cydno
cydno longwing, underside

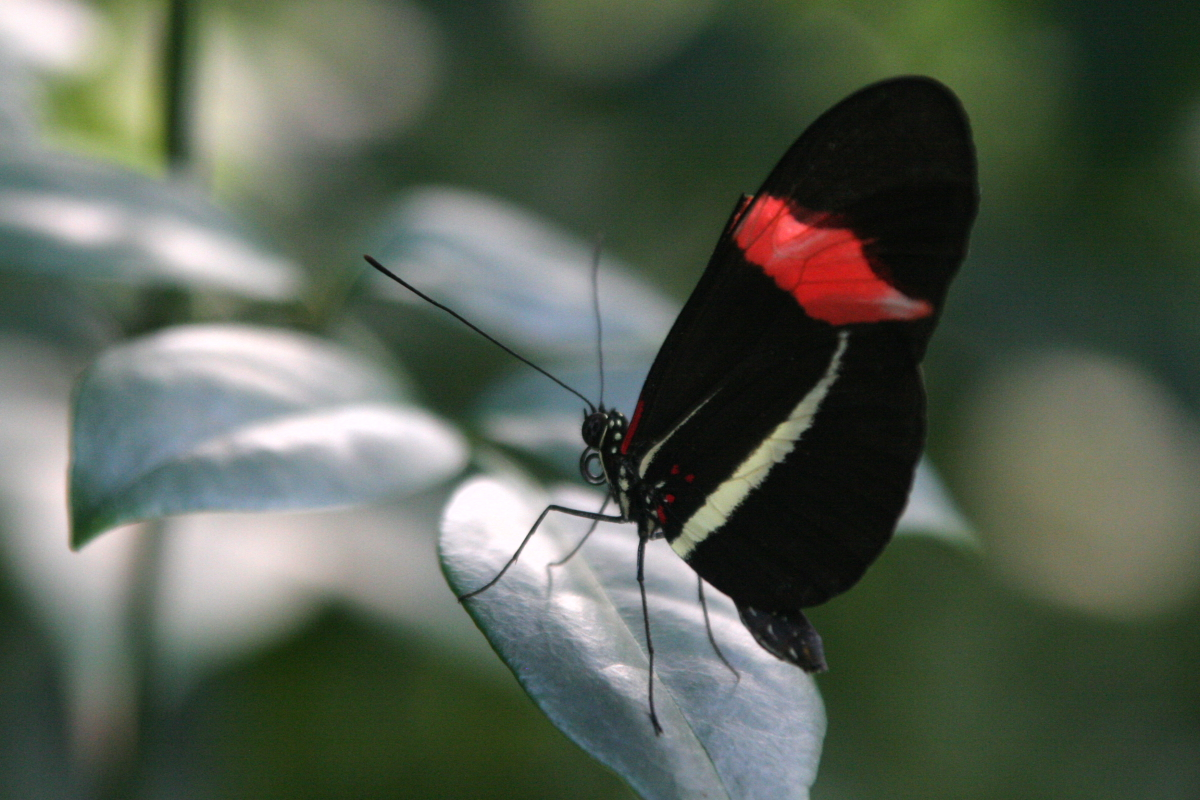
Heliconius erato
red postman

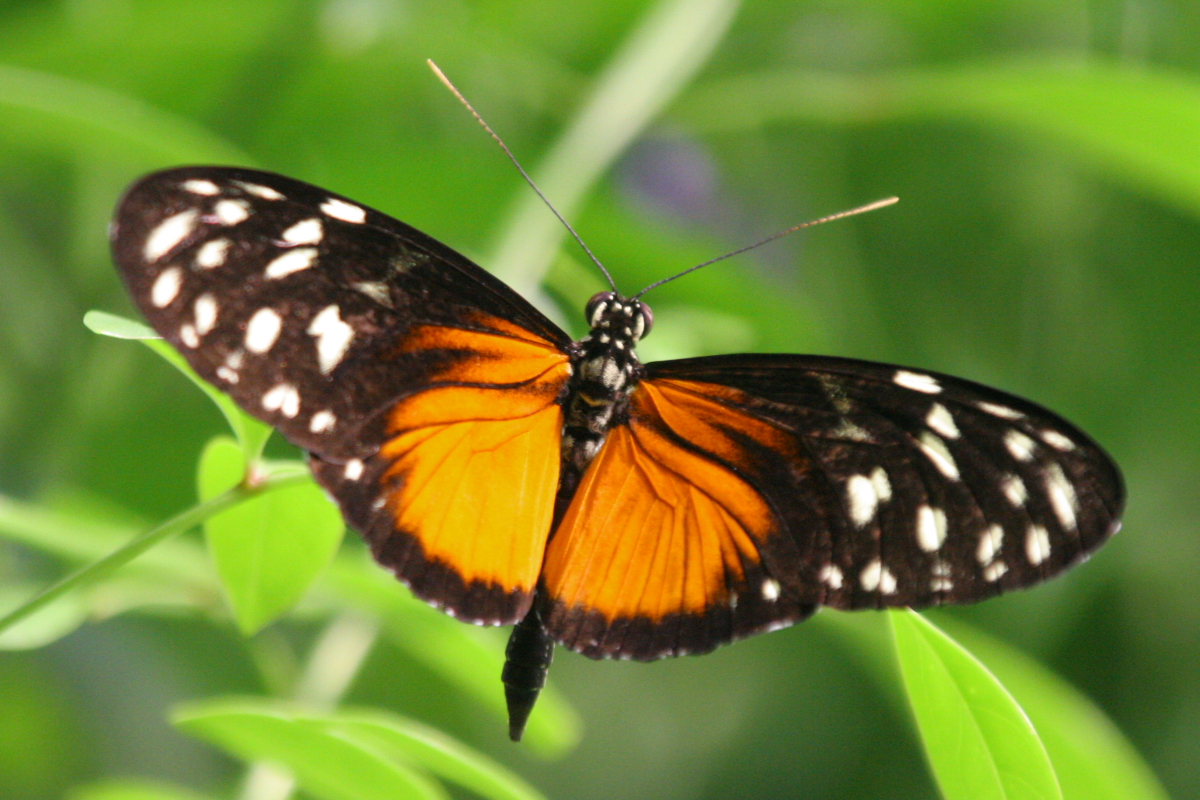
Heliconius hecale
tiger longwing

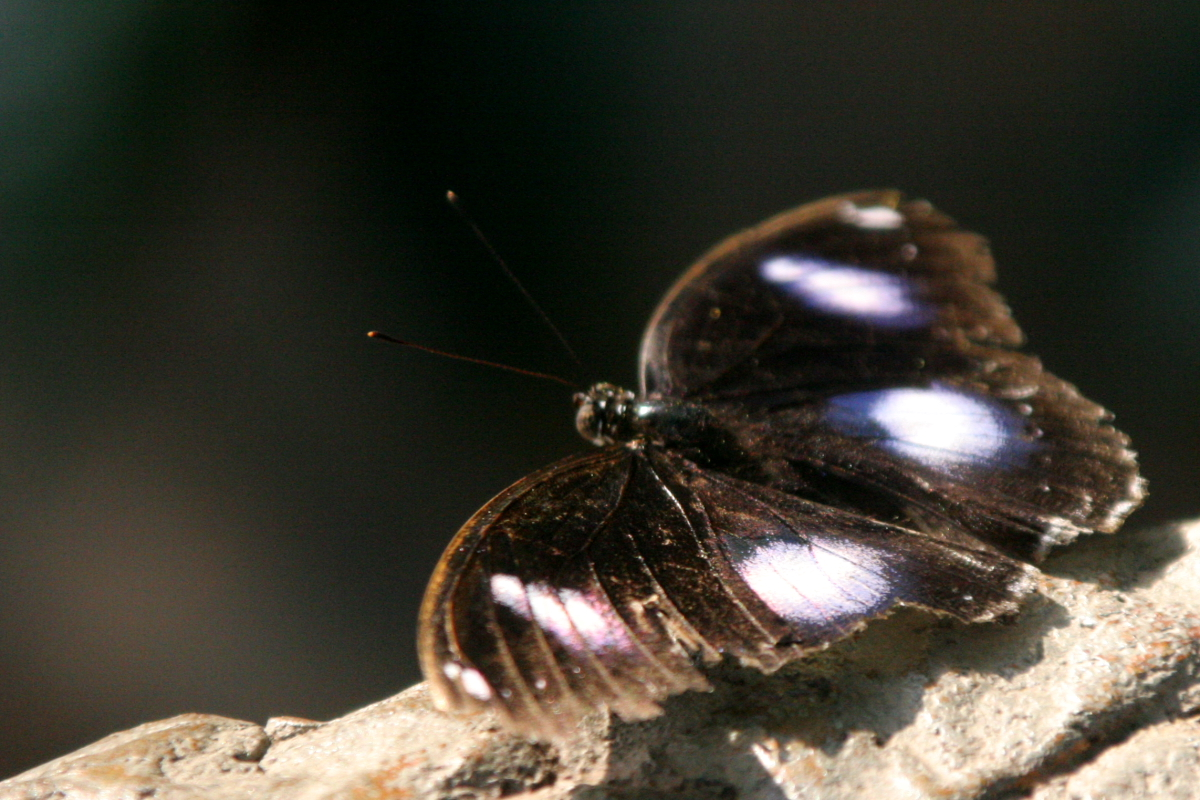
Hypolimnas bolina
great egg fly, male

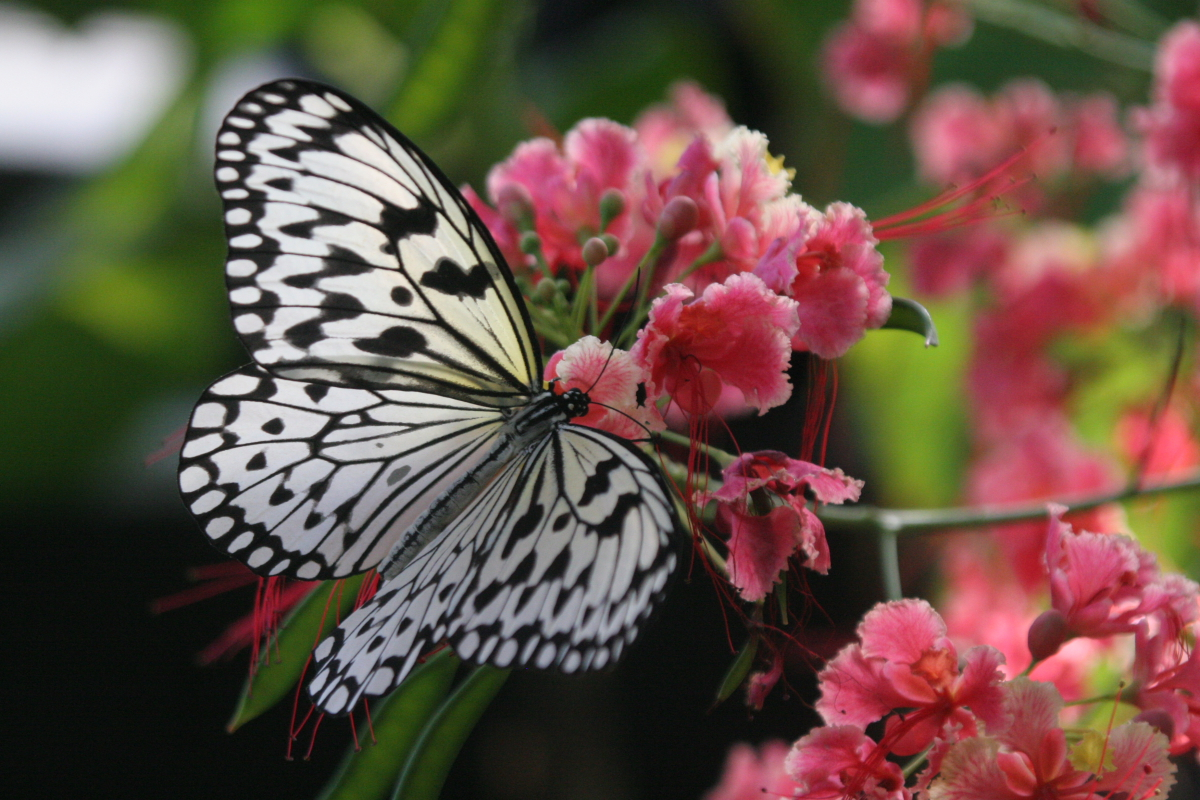
Idea leuconoe
paper kite

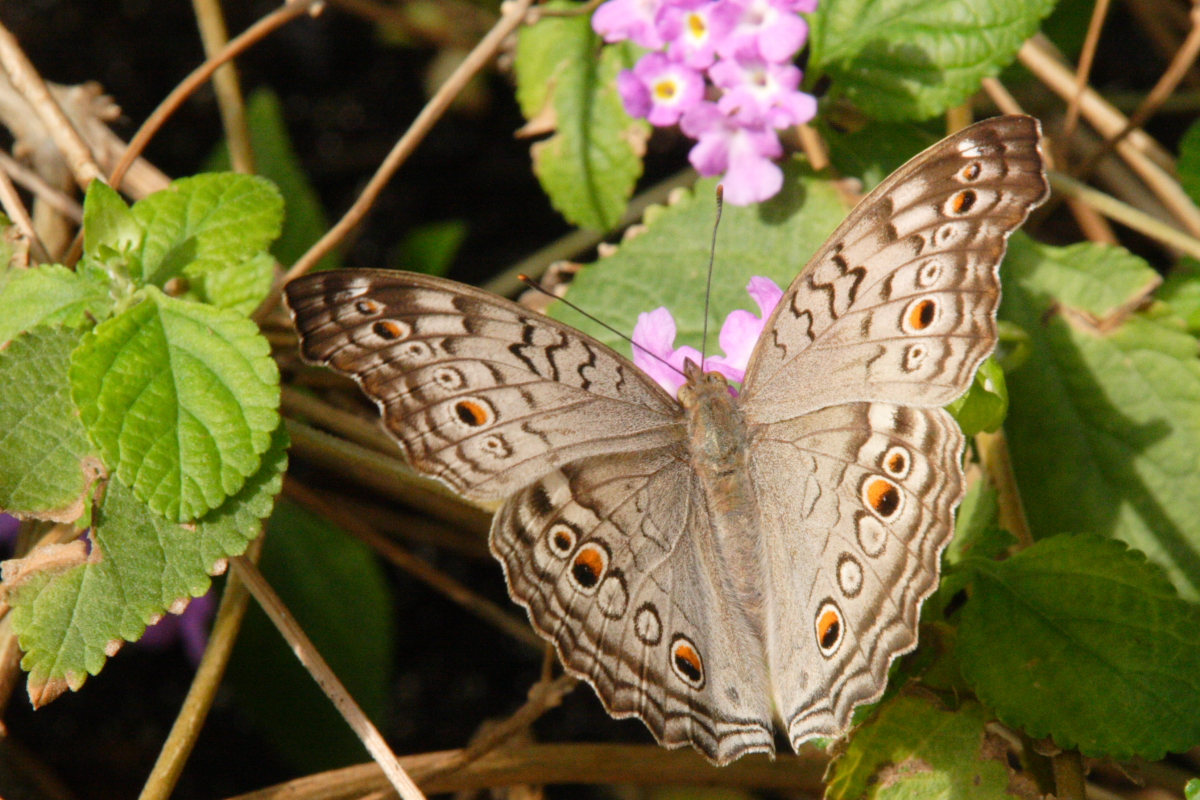
Junonia atlites
gray pansy

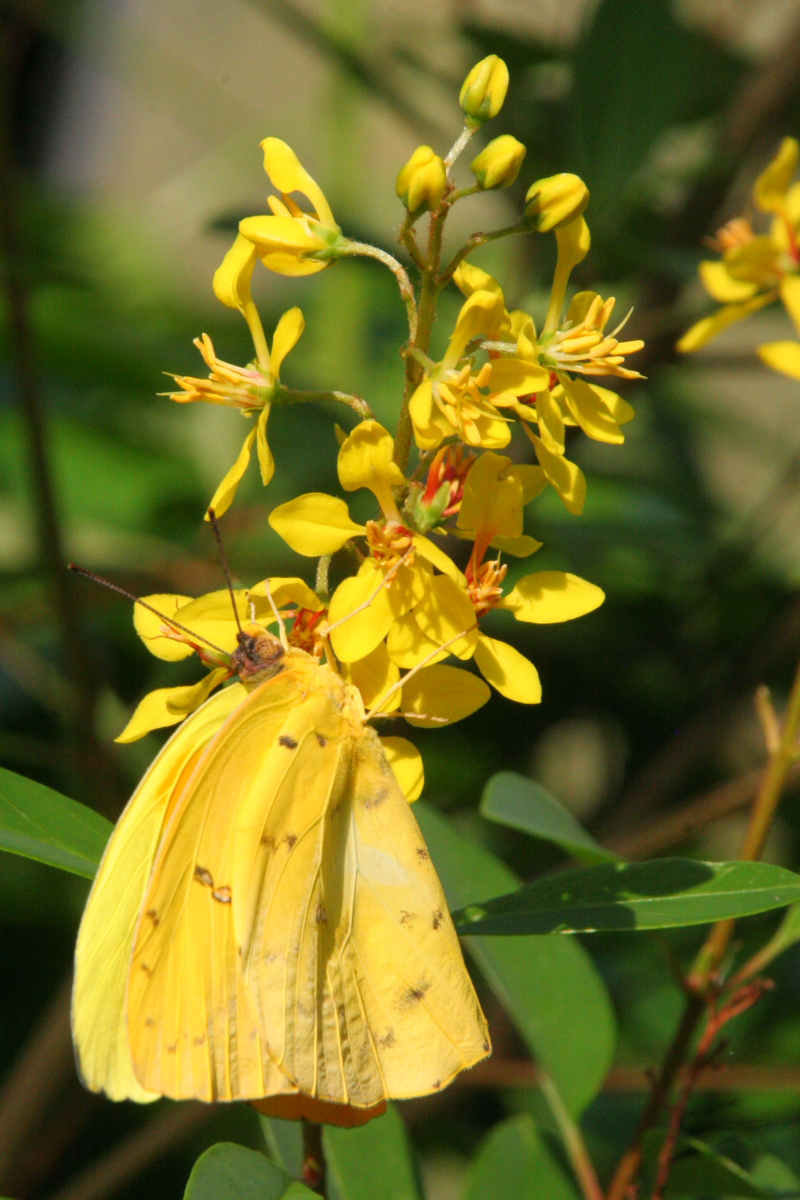
Phoebis sennae
cloudless sulphur

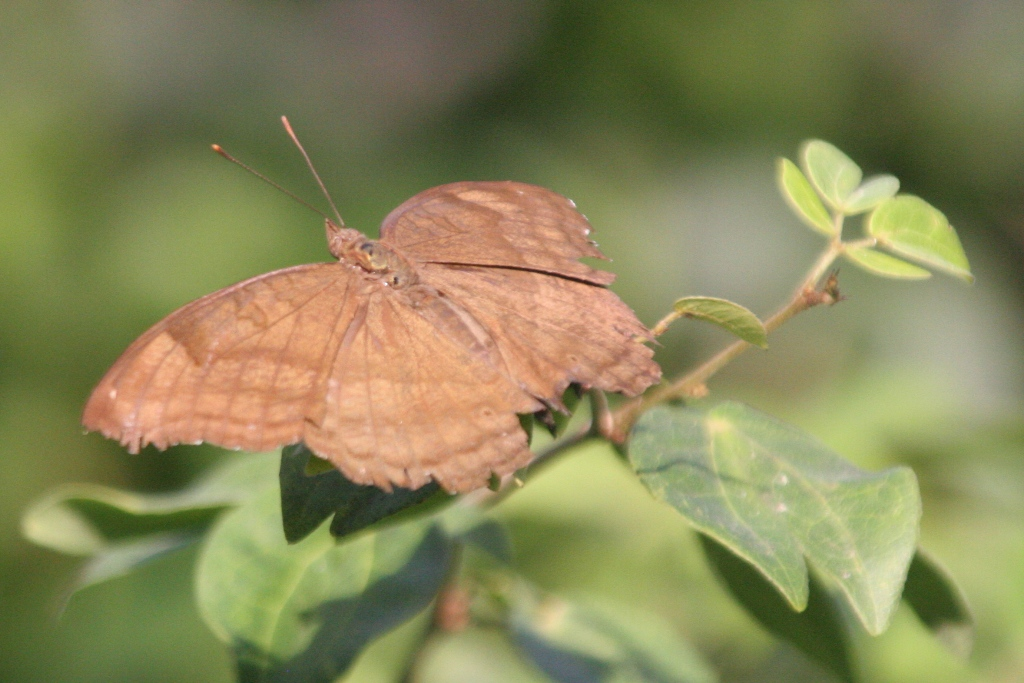
Precis iphita
chocolate pansy

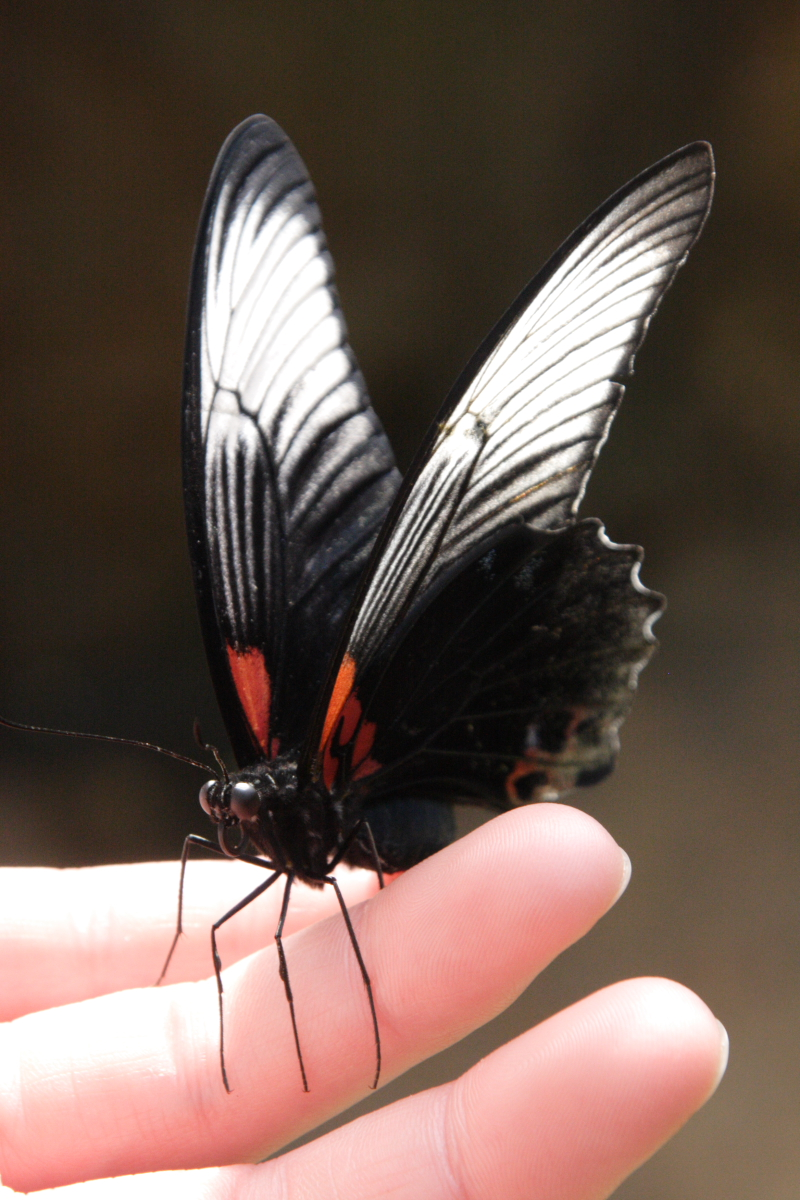
Princeps memnon
great Mormon, female

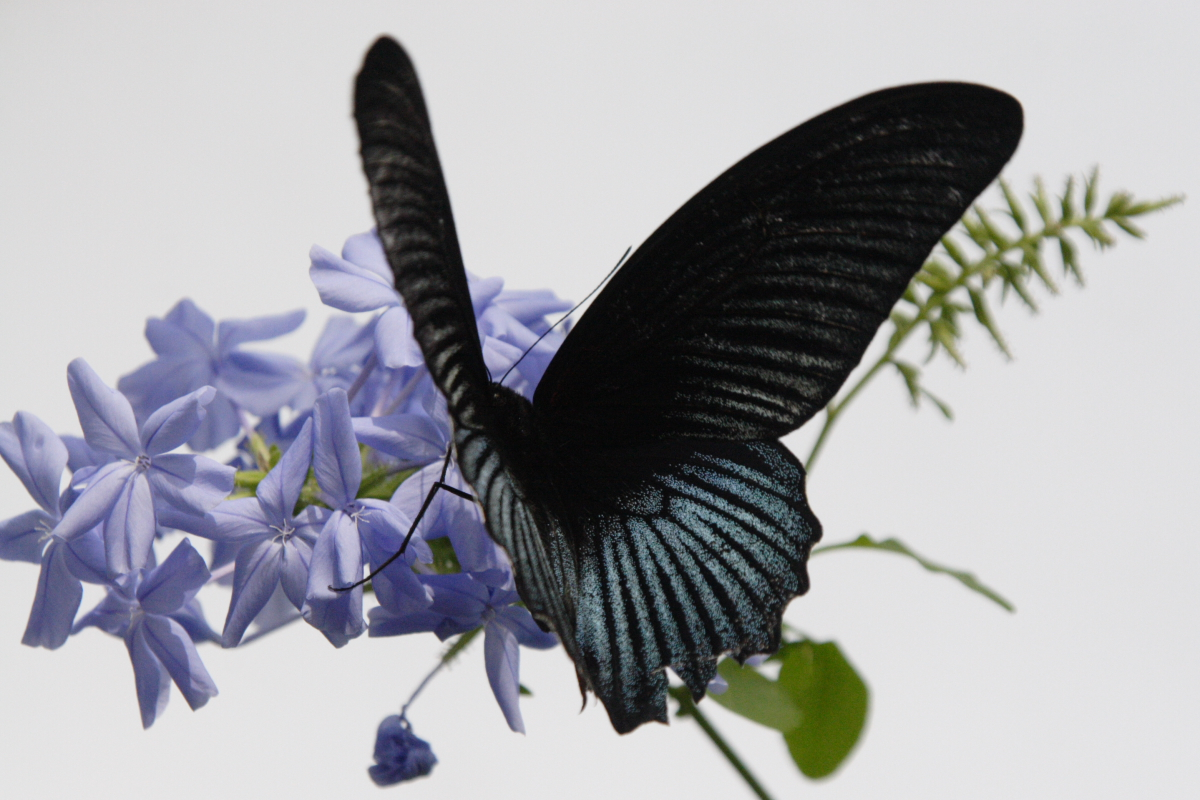
Princeps memnon
great Mormon, male

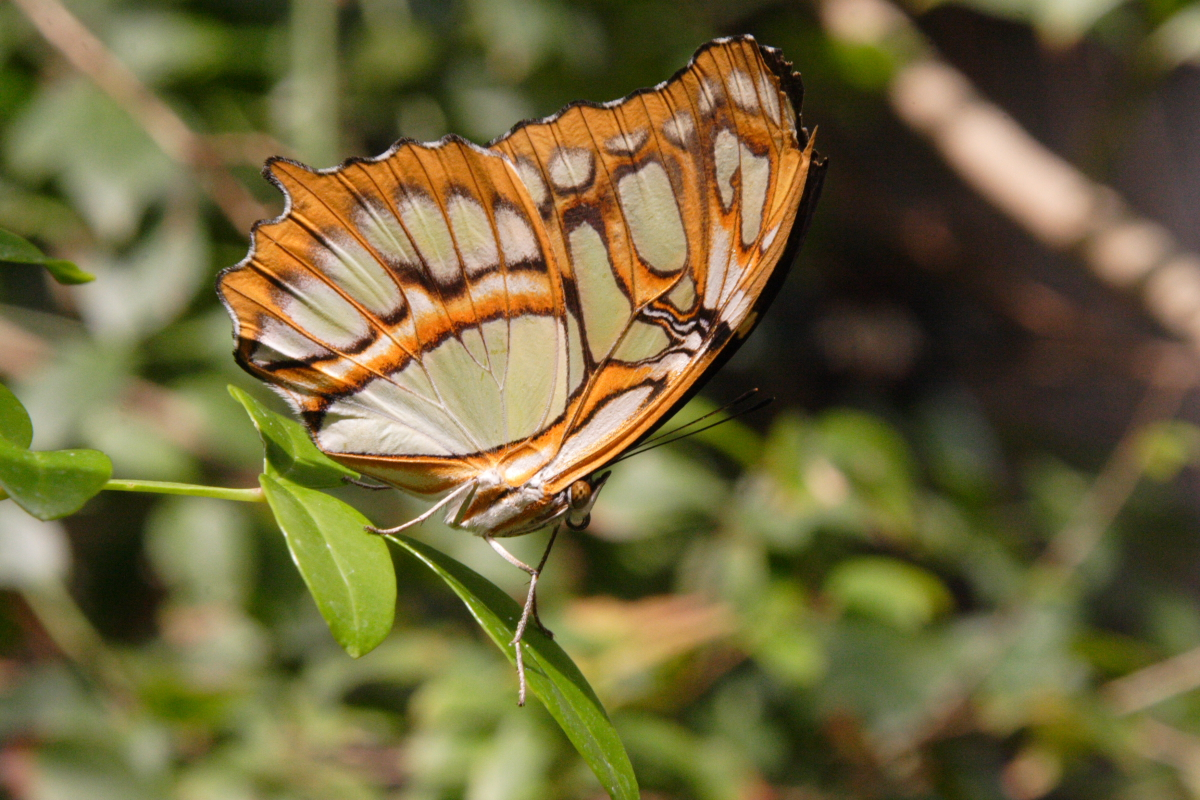
Siproeta stelenes
malachite, underside
