= Pegylis ertli =

Scientific classification
- Kingdom: Animalia
- Phylum: Arthropoda
- Clade: Pancrustacea
- Class: Insecta
- Order: Coleoptera
- Suborder: Polyphaga
- Infraorder: Scarabaeiformia
- Family: Scarabaeidae
- Tribe: Melolonthini
- Genus: Pegylis
- Species: P. ertli

Binomial name
- Pegylis ertli Moser, 1919

Species of beetle

Pegylis ertli is a species of beetle of the family Scarabaeidae. It is found in Tanzania.

== Description ==
Adults reach a length of about 13–15 mm. They are similar to Pegylis usambarae, but the clypeus is much less tapered and longer towards the front, its anterior margin shows hardly any hint of a bulge. On the elytra, the fine, leathery wrinkling is somewhat more pronounced, and the pubescence of the thorax is somewhat denser.
