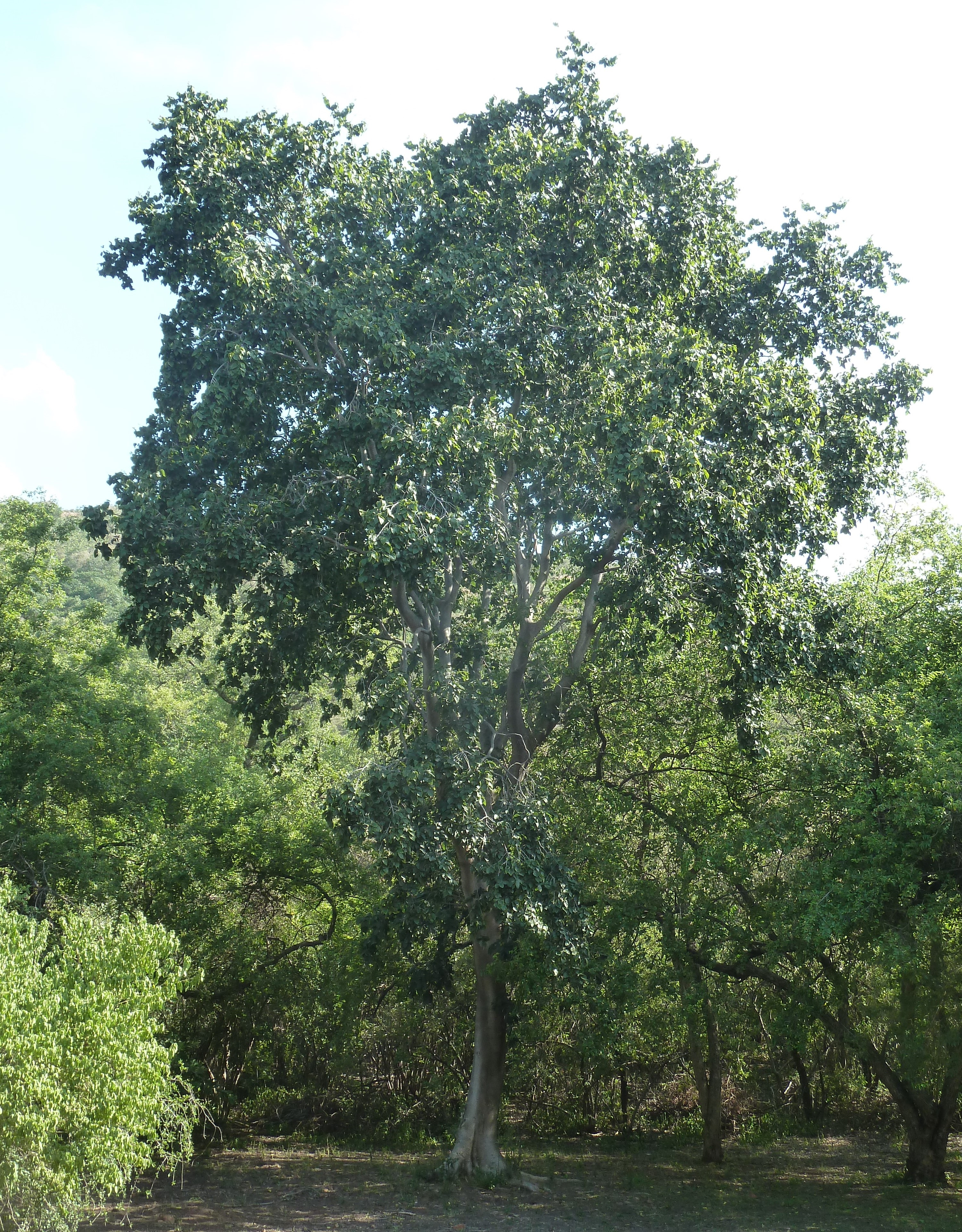

Scientific classification
- Kingdom: Plantae
- Clade: Tracheophytes
- Clade: Angiosperms
- Clade: Eudicots
- Clade: Rosids
- Order: Rosales
- Family: Cannabaceae
- Genus: Celtis
- Species: C. africana

Binomial name
- Celtis africana Burm.f.

Synonyms
- List: Celtis burmanni Planch.; Celtis henriquezii Engl.; Celtis holtzii Engl.; Celtis kraussiana Bernh.; Celtis opegrapha Planch.; Celtis vesiculosa Hochst. ex Planch.

= Celtis africana =

White stinkwood

Species of tree

Celtis africana, the white stinkwood, is a deciduous tree in the family Cannabaceae. Its habit ranges from a tall tree in forest to a medium-sized tree in bushveld and open country, and a shrub on rocky soil. It occurs in Yemen and Somaliland and over large parts of Africa south of the Sahara. It is a common tree in the south and east of southern Africa, where the odour given off by freshly-cut green timber is similar to that of Ocotea bullata or black stinkwood.

== Description ==
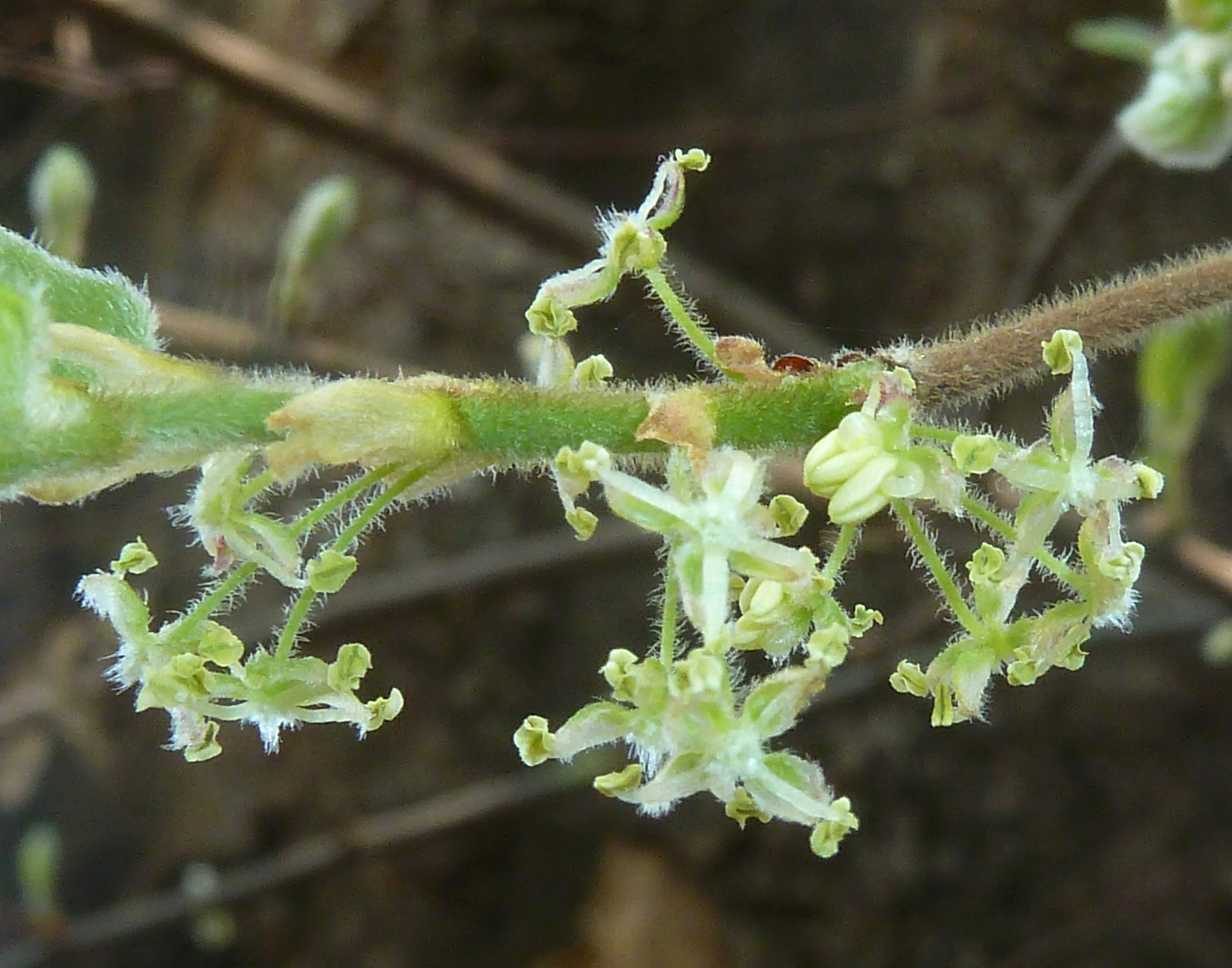
Clusters of staminate (male) flowers with 4 tepals and 4 stamens each

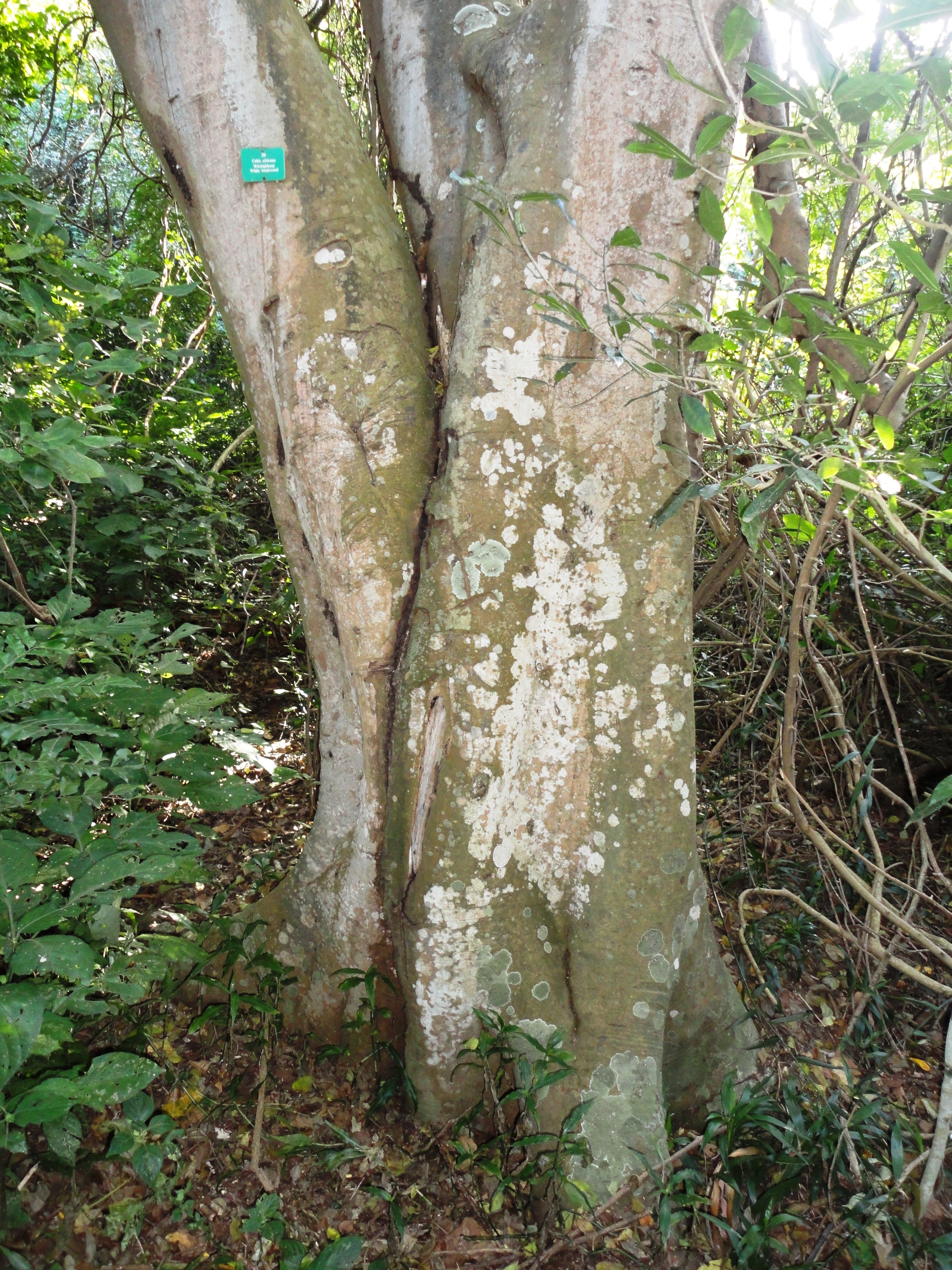
Trunk of a tree growing in coastal forest at Burman Bush, Durban

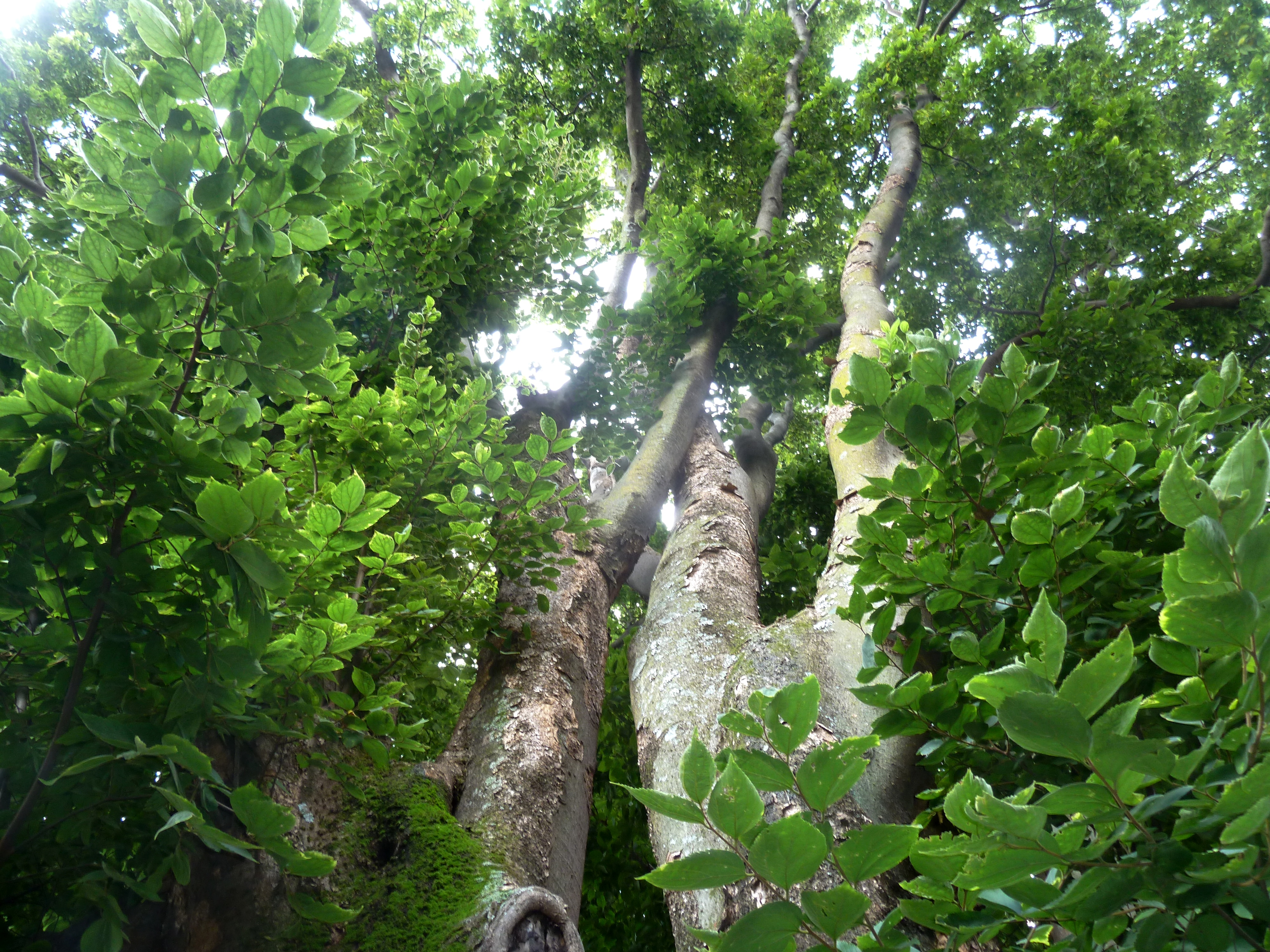
Summer foliage

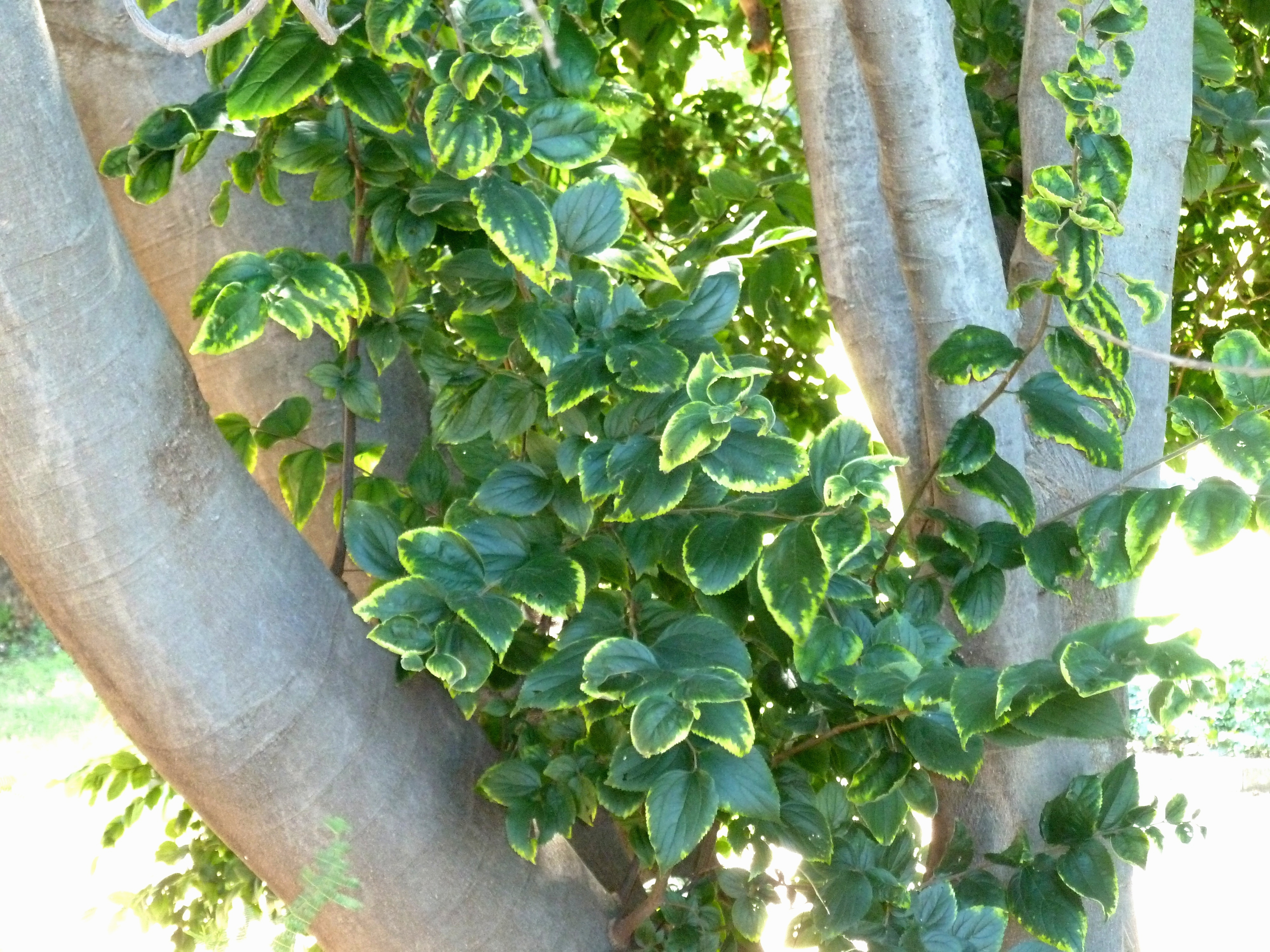
The simple, alternate leaves have toothed margins, and are increasingly edged with yellow as the season progresses.

=== Habit ===
Growing as an individual tree in the open and under favourable conditions, Celtis africana becomes a tree of medium height, typically up to 12 m (39 ft) or so. It then usually forms a dense, hemispherical canopy. The bole of a mature tree then is thick and buttressed, often forked fairly near the ground. In forest it may grow up to 25 m (82 ft) tall, with a single, clean bole, though such large specimens usually are more or less buttressed too. In an exposed, rocky position it may be a bonsai-like small shrub. The trunk has a smooth, pale grey to white bark that may be loosely peeling in old trees and commonly has horizontal ridges.

=== Foliage ===
The tree is deciduous in the drier, frostier interior of its range in Africa, but semi-deciduous nearer the coast; in areas with wetter, milder winters it commonly retains its old leaves till after the spring leaf-flush appears. In spring it produces light green, tender, new leaves that contrast with the pale bark. The leaves are simple, alternate, ovate to acuminate in shape with three distinct veins from the base. The leaf margin is slightly toothed (specifically serrate) towards the apex, whereas the basal third tends to be entire. The new leaves are bright, fresh green and hairy on the upper surface; they turn darker green and become smoother as they mature. (Leaf size: 15 to 100 mm length x 10 to 50 mm breadth).

=== Flowers and fruit ===
The trees' small flowers are pale yellow in colour, and appear from August to October. Their fruit are carried on long, thin stalks. They are yellow or brown in colour and about 4 mm in diameter.

== Range and habitat ==
Occurs in a wide variety of habitats from wet forest and coastal bush to bushveld, mountain gorges and open country, typically savanna. Its range extends from the Western Cape, eastwards and northwards around the southern African coastline, extending inland in the warmer, wetter regions, and further north into Ethiopia.

== Ecology ==
Celtis africana leaves are browsed by cattle and goats, and also eaten from the ground when shed.

Various species of Celtis are food plants for the larvae of various species of long-nosed butterfly; the genus Libythea. In particular, Celtis africana is the host to Libythea labdaca. The leaves also provide food for the larvae of Caloptilia celtina.

The inconspicuous, small, greenish, star-like flowers appear in early spring (August to October). Male and female flowers are separate, but they are produced on the same tree. Various insects pollinate them, particularly honeybees.

From October to February, following flowering, the rounded, berry-like fruit (botanically speaking drupes) appear. They are borne in large numbers on stalks about 1–2 cm long. As they ripen they change from green to yellow-brown or black. Though small, they typically are plentiful enough to be an important item of diet for many species of frugivorous birds that feed on the fruits and disperse the seeds in their manure. As a result, the seedlings not only may sprout far from the parent trees, but germinate unpredictably in all sorts of cracks in rocks or rotting wood as well as in fortunate locations in good soil. Their attraction for birds renders Celtis africana a popular tree in planning bird-friendly gardens.

Fruit and seeds are eaten by various animals, including chacma baboon, vervet monkey, tambourine dove, Cape parrot, Rameron pigeon, Knysna lourie, purple-crested lourie, mousebirds, black-collared barbet, crested barbet, Karoo thrush, Cape robin-chat, chorister robin-chat, Cape bulbul, black-eyed bulbul, plum-coloured starling and thick-billed weaver.

== Cultivation ==
The species is easily propagated from seed, though for best results it is well to collect ripe fruit from the tree itself because seeds in dropped fruit commonly have been damaged by insects. It is best to separate the seed from the fruit tissue before planting, because the pulp inhibits germination until it has been removed by the digestive processes of birds. Celtis africana is a useful tree for planting along roadsides in urban areas of southern Africa.

Seedlings are planted in high-quality soil several meters away from other structures. Once established, they will do well even in fairly challenging conditions.

There is some reluctance to plant the tree in small gardens because it grows quite large, and some care is necessary because heavy branches growing at an unfavourable angle may split off and fall dangerously. This can however be forestalled and prevented by competent pruning and other arboricultural practices.

== Similar species ==
Related nettle trees of the genus Celtis have been introduced to South Africa, and are readily confused with the white stinkwood. These species, which typically have the leaves less hairy, have been introduced as shade trees in gardens and parks, or invade river banks and other city spaces. Some of them also hybridize, as all are wind pollinated. C. occidentalis, of American origin, is distinguishable by the warts on it bark, besides the distinctly larger purple or black fruit of some 1 cm (0.4 in) in diameter. C. australis is of Mediterranean origin. Its leaves have a rough upper side, and the fruit resemble those of C. occidentalis. C. sinensis is of oriental origin and has dark, glossy leaves, that are only hairy on the underside. Its fruit are dark orange and about 6 mm in diameter. Its numerous fruit are carried on short and sturdy stalks.

The pigeonwood (Trema orientalis) was formerly classified as a Celtis species, and is likewise easily confused with the white stinkwood. The white stinkwood has nothing in common with the black stinkwood, a source of high-quality timber, which acquired its name from the strong smell of freshly felled trees.

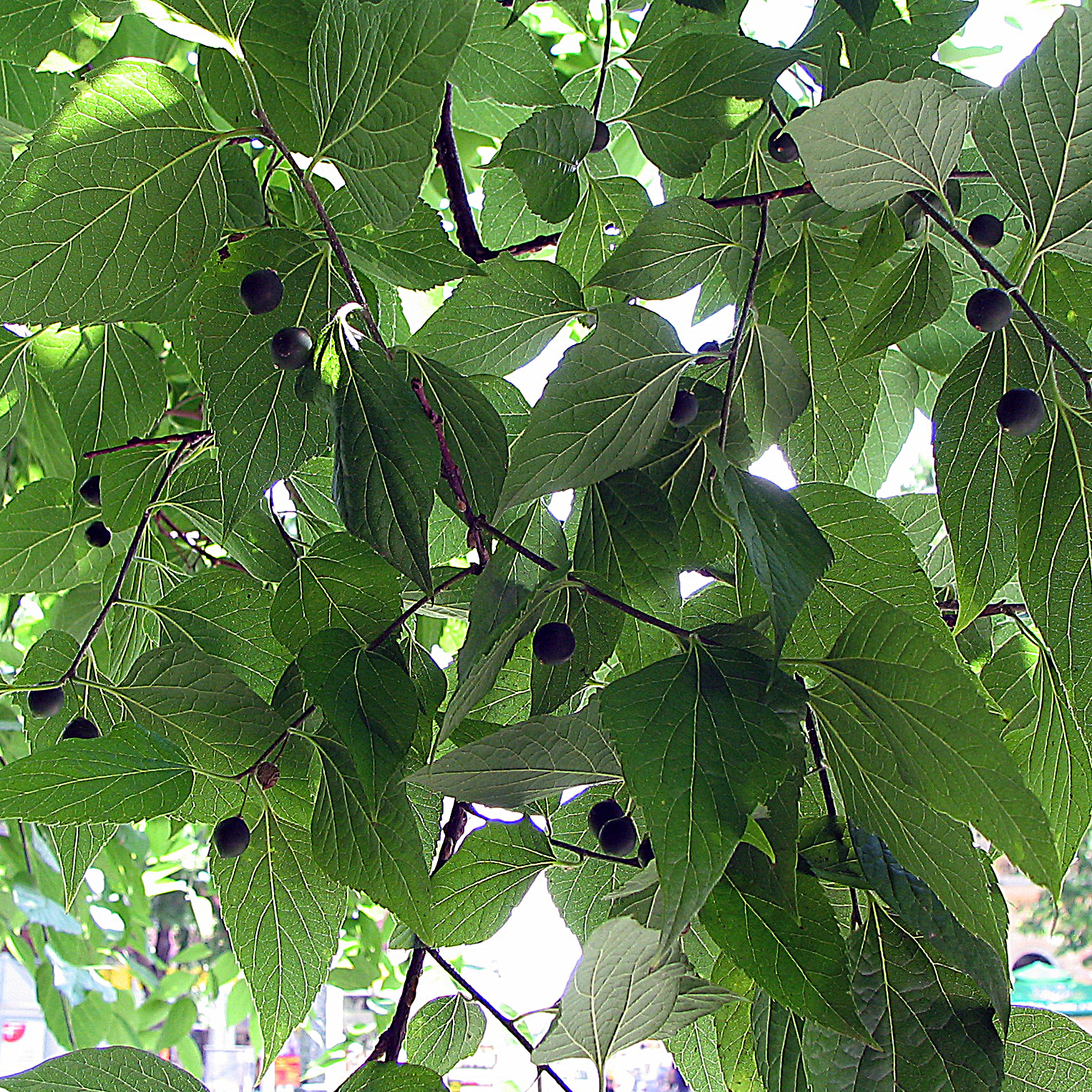
C. occidentalis has large fruit that are black or purple when ripe.

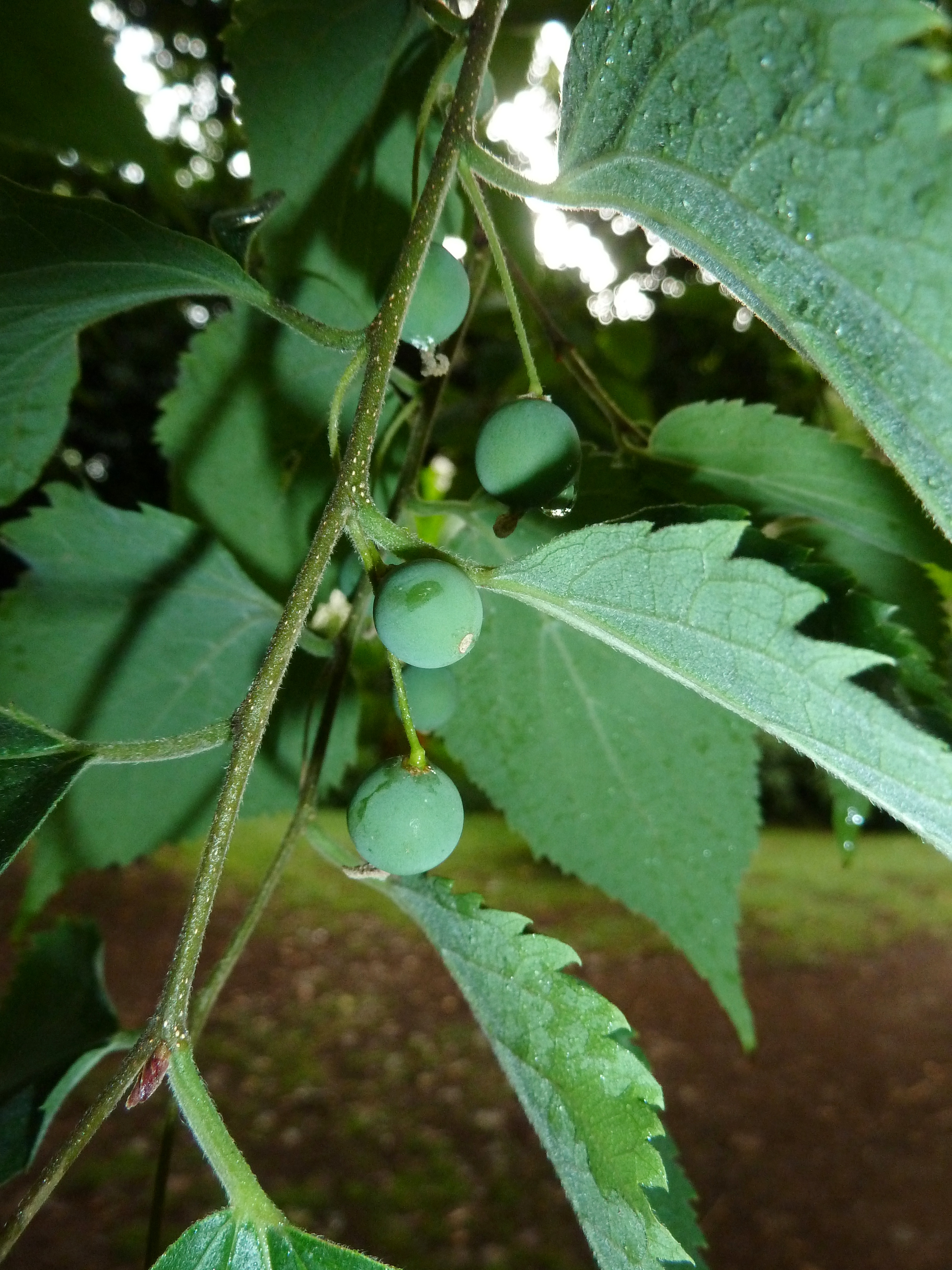
C. australis, here with large and still green fruit. Its leaves have rough upper surfaces.

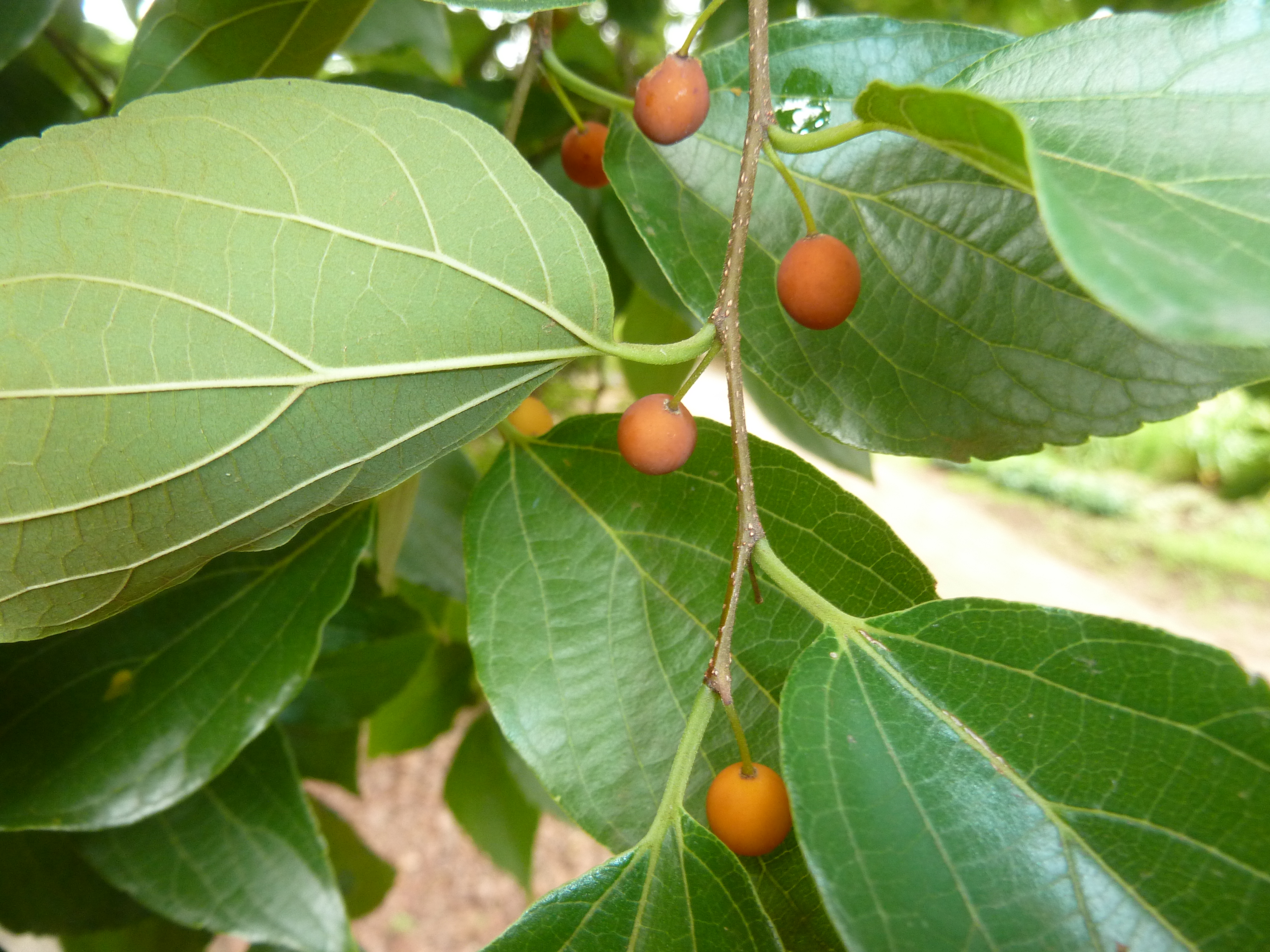
C. sinensis with orange fruit and glossy, almost hairless leaves
