= Pegylis vestita =

Scientific classification
- Kingdom: Animalia
- Phylum: Arthropoda
- Clade: Pancrustacea
- Class: Insecta
- Order: Coleoptera
- Suborder: Polyphaga
- Infraorder: Scarabaeiformia
- Family: Scarabaeidae
- Tribe: Melolonthini
- Genus: Pegylis
- Species: P. vestita

Binomial name
- Pegylis vestita Brenske, 1895

Species of beetle

Pegylis vestita is a species of beetle of the family Scarabaeidae. It is found in Ethiopia, Kenya and possibly Tanzania.

== Description ==
Adults reach a length of about 14 mm (0.55 in). The head is densely covered with hairs and the thorax has acute hind angles and is also very densely hairy. The elytra have short hairs. They are similar to Pegylis gestroi.
