= Pegylis kigonserana =

Scientific classification
- Kingdom: Animalia
- Phylum: Arthropoda
- Clade: Pancrustacea
- Class: Insecta
- Order: Coleoptera
- Suborder: Polyphaga
- Infraorder: Scarabaeiformia
- Family: Scarabaeidae
- Tribe: Melolonthini
- Genus: Pegylis
- Species: P. kigonserana

Binomial name
- Pegylis kigonserana Moser, 1919

Species of beetle

Pegylis kigonserana is a species of beetle of the family Scarabaeidae. It is found in Tanzania.

== Description ==
Adults reach a length of about 22 mm. They are similar to Pegylis lukulediana, but the fine punctation of the upper surface is consistently denser, the anterior margin of the clypeus is somewhat more strongly upturned, the anterior angles of the pronotum are more projecting and therefore acute and the sides of the pronotum are weakly indented behind the middle. The middle of the pronotum shows, as in lukulediana, the faint suggestion of a median groove.
