= Pegylis pondoensis =

Scientific classification
- Kingdom: Animalia
- Phylum: Arthropoda
- Clade: Pancrustacea
- Class: Insecta
- Order: Coleoptera
- Suborder: Polyphaga
- Infraorder: Scarabaeiformia
- Family: Scarabaeidae
- Tribe: Melolonthini
- Genus: Pegylis
- Species: P. pondoensis

Binomial name
- Pegylis pondoensis Arrow, 1943

Species of beetle

Pegylis pondoensis is a species of beetle of the family Scarabaeidae. It is found in South Africa (Eastern Cape, KwaZulu-Natal, Limpopo, Mpumalanga).

== Description ==
Adults reach a length of about 17–19 mm (0.67–0.75 in) for males and 18–19 mm (0.71–0.75 in) for females. They are light brown to darker brown or slightly mottled.

== Life history ==
Adults have been recorded feeding on Celtis africana.
