= Libythea collenettei =

Marquesan snout butterfly

Scientific classification
- Domain: Eukaryota
- Kingdom: Animalia
- Phylum: Arthropoda
- Class: Insecta
- Order: Lepidoptera
- Family: Nymphalidae
- Genus: Libythea
- Species: L. collenettei

Binomial name
- Libythea collenettei Poulton & Riley, 1923

Species of butterfly

Libythea collenettei, the Marquesan snout butterfly, is a species of Nymphalid butterfly in the subfamily Libytheinae. The species was first described by Edward Bagnall Poulton and Norman Denbigh Riley in 1923. The specific name honours its original collector, Cyril Leslie Collenette, a member of the 1925 St George Expedition to French Polynesia. It is endemic to French Polynesia, L. collenettei is the only species of butterfly endemic to the Marquesas Islands.

Its conservation status has not been evaluated by the IUCN. However, a survey by Akito Y. Kawahara and Emmanuel Toussaint in 2018 designates it as endangered using the IUCN 3.1 criterion, but with an overall lack of sightings it is possibly extinct. It was previously listed as extinct, but was rediscovered in 2001 by Kawahara.

It is threatened by deforestation because encroaching Caribbean pine tree farms incentivize clearing the host plant Celtis pacifica from the Toovii Plateau of Nuku Hiva.

It is morphologically similar to Libythea geoffroyi, but its placement within the genus Libythea is questioned. Currently it is believed that L. collenettei is a sister taxon to the remainder of the genus Libythea.

== Distribution ==
L. collenettei is endemic to the Marquesas Islands. It has been reported on the islands of Fatu Hiva, Ua Pou, Hiva Oa, Nuku Hiva, Tahuata, Ua Huka, and Mohotani. In 2001, it was believed to be relatively common on the island of Ua Pou.

A February 2018 survey on the islands of Nuku Hiva, Ua Pou, and Hiva Oa turned up no sightings. There has been an outreach program by researchers to the local people to report sightings of L. collenettei; as of 2019, there have been no reports of sightings.

== Life history ==
Larvae of this species feed on Celtis pacifica.

Adults have been collected flying around mountain streams. Its sightings suggest that it is multivoltine, rather than univoltine. This contrasts with the remainder of the genus Libythea which is univoltine.
