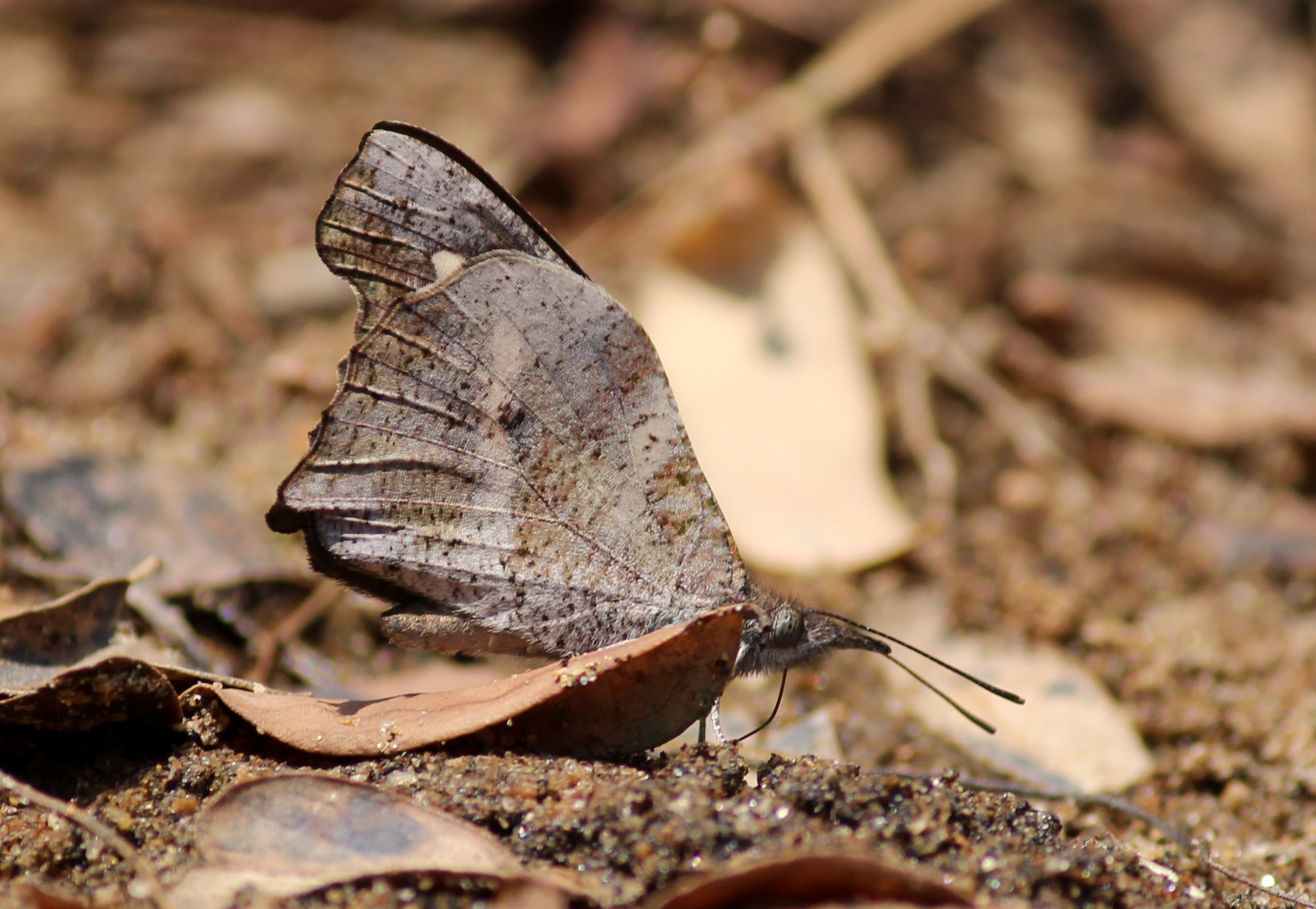
- Libythea laius lepitoides in Kerala, India

Scientific classification
- Domain: Eukaryota
- Kingdom: Animalia
- Phylum: Arthropoda
- Class: Insecta
- Order: Lepidoptera
- Family: Nymphalidae
- Genus: Libythea
- Species: L. laius

Binomial name
- Libythea laius Trimen, 1879

Synonyms
- Libythea werneri Fruhstorfer, 1903

= Libythea laius =

Lobed beak

Species of butterfly

Libythea laius, the lobed beak, is a member of the butterfly subfamily Libytheinae found in East Africa, Madagascar, southern India, and Sri Lanka. It was described by Roland Trimen in 1879.

Libythea laius was formerly considered a synonym of Libythea labdaca, which has similar dorsal wing markings, but it differs from that species in that the rectangular orange mark in the discal cell apex is fused to or separated from the discal cell base.

== Subspecies ==
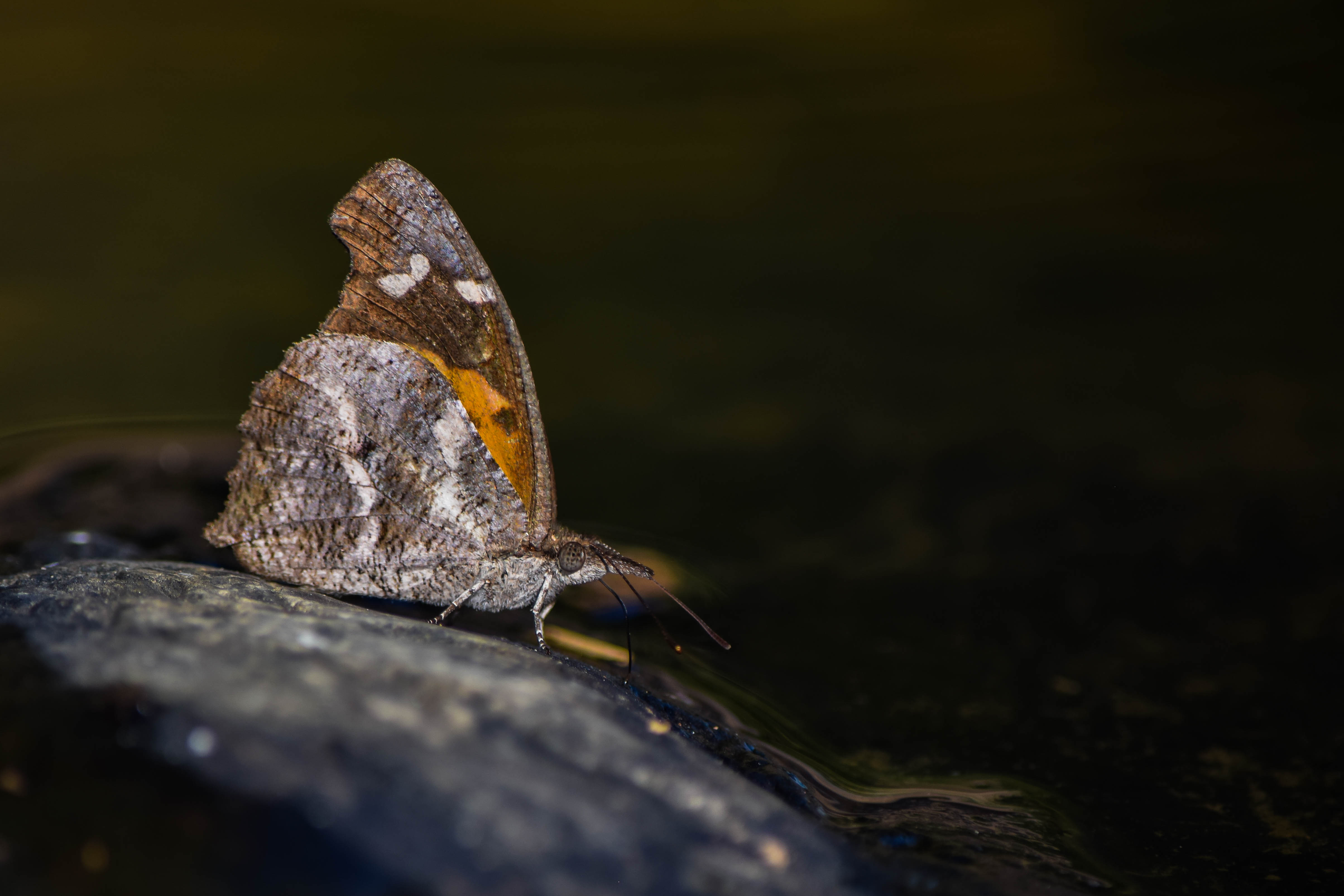
Libythea laius lepitoides-Lobed beak

- Libythea laius laius Trimen, 1879 (eastern and southern Africa, including Kenya, Malawi, Mozambique, South Africa, Sudan, Tanzania, and Zimbabwe)
- Libythea laius lepitoides Moore, 1903 (southern India and Sri Lanka)

Male. Upperside with the ferruginous markings loss sharply defined than in Libythea lepita. Forewing differs in the cell-streak being broken into two portions, and the contiguous discal spots somewhat smaller; both subapical spots entirely white and smaller. Hindwing with the medial-discal band similar. Under-side. Forewing with the cell-streak broader than on the upperside and partly broken, the basal portion being also much diffused; the discal spot paler, subapical spots white; mottled apex pale grey. Hindwing paler grey, with more thickly mottled darker fasciae, in some these fasciae are very prominently black; a distinct small patch of black scales is present on the disc in the discoidal interspace beyond base of the upper median veinlet.

— Frederic Moore, Lepidoptera Indica. Vol. V

- Libythea laius tsiandava Grose-Smith 1891 (Madagascar)
