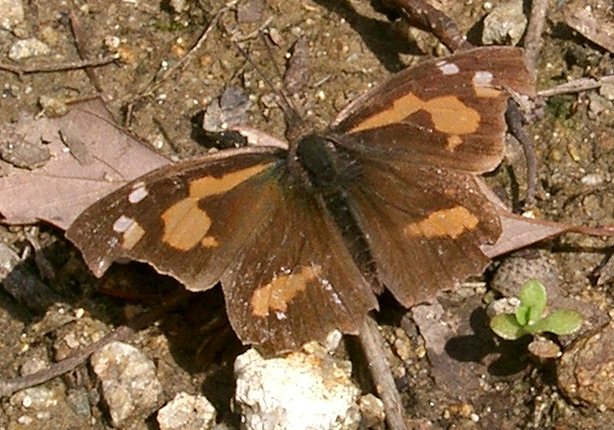

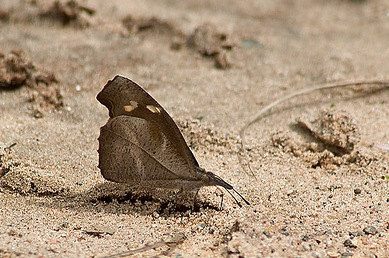

Scientific classification
- Kingdom: Animalia
- Phylum: Arthropoda
- Class: Insecta
- Order: Lepidoptera
- Family: Nymphalidae
- Genus: Libythea
- Species: L. lepita

Binomial name
- Libythea lepita Moore, 1857

= Libythea lepita =

Common beak

Species of butterfly

Libythea lepita, the common beak, is a butterfly that belongs to the Libytheinae group of the brush-footed butterflies family. It is found from southern India to Japan and its larval food plants include members of the Cannabaceae, particularly in the genera Celtis and Trema.

== Description ==
The species was earlier considered a race of Libythea celtis, the European beak. The following description is based on the older treatment and the race lepita and lepitoides described below refer to this species.

=== Race lepita Moore ===
Race lepita ranges from the Himalayas (Shimla and Sikkim to Assam) to Upper Myanmar, China and Japan. It differs from the European beak Libythea celtis as follows:

Upperside ground colour a slightly darker brown.
Forewing: orange-yellow streak in cell much narrower for two-thirds of its length from base, then abruptly expanded anteriorly so as to fill the apex of the cell, the inner margin of the apical portion and the anterior margin of the basal portion forming a clearly defined right angle; lower discal spot absent, upper larger discal spot somewhat diamond shaped; subcostal spot and preapical spot placed obliquely outwards from it more distinctly double, the lower portion of the subapical spot orange-yellow, the upper portion and the subcostal spot white.
Hindwing: the upper postdiscal orange patch narrower, forming a short band which is not curved but placed obliquely transverse, reaching from vein 2 to vein 6, sometimes but rarely with a detached orange spot above it in interspace 6.
Underside: ground colour variable, generally vinous brown, paler along the costal and dorsal margins of the forewing; sometimes dark brown on the forewing, dark greyish on the hindwing, with the costal margin broadly of the forewing and the whole of the hindwing irrorated with minute dark striae and spots.
Orange and white markings on the forewing as on the upperside, but the preapical double spot entirely white. The hindwing is more variable; in some specimens it is uniform without any markings, in others it is shaded transversely light and dark, and in a few specimens the wing is longitudinally divided by a dark-brown diffuse band from base along the median vein to apex of vein 5. Antennae, head, thorax and abdomen as in L. celtis.

=== Race lepitoides Moore ===
Race lepitoides ranges from southern India to Sri Lanka, and differs from lepita as follows:

Hindwing: tornus narrowly produced, dentate or even, subcaudate.
Upperside: ground colour darker brown.
Forewing: the orange-yellow streak in cell divided from the spot in the apex of the cell, the large discal spot smaller, the subcostal and subapical spots more distinctly double, the latter pure white.
Hindwing: the transverse short band narrower and more horizontal; a diffuse quadrate pale spot in the middle of interspace 7, larger in the female than in the male.
Underside forewing: ground colour dark brown, the apex, the termen narrowly and slightly, and the dorsal margin somewhat broadly touched with grey, irrorated with minute dark dots and transverse striae; the orange-yellow and white markings as on the upperside, the former broader and fuller, the cellular streak not interrupted.
Hindwing pale grey, shaded broadly at base, on the disc and posteriorly, with brown, the pale grey ground colour prominently replacing the transverse orange streak and pale subcostal spot of the upperside. In some specimens there is a very dark brown shading from base of the wing along the median vein. The entire surface of the wing is irrorated with minute dots and transverse short striae. Antennae, head, thorax and abdomen as in celtis.

Race lepitoides is now considered as a sub-species of Libythea laius.

== See also ==
- List of butterflies of India
- List of butterflies of India (Nymphalidae)
