= Pegylis =

Scientific classification
- Kingdom: Animalia
- Phylum: Arthropoda
- Clade: Pancrustacea
- Class: Insecta
- Order: Coleoptera
- Suborder: Polyphaga
- Infraorder: Scarabaeiformia
- Family: Scarabaeidae
- Subfamily: Melolonthinae
- Tribe: Melolonthini
- Genus: Pegylis; Erichson, 1847

Synonyms
- Pegylidius Péringuey, 1904; Adoretopsis Fairmaire, 1887; Hypopholis Erichson, 1847

Genus of leaf beetles

Pegylis, also known as the large wattle chafers, is a genus of beetles belonging to the family Scarabaeidae.

== Species ==
- Pegylis angolensis Moser, 1915
- Pegylis bennigseni Brenske, 1898
- Pegylis burgeoni Decelle, 1968
- Pegylis conspurcata (Gerstaecker, 1867)
- Pegylis ertli Moser, 1919
- Pegylis genieri Lacroix & Montreuil, 2017
- Pegylis gestroi Brenske, 1895
- Pegylis giraudetae Decelle, 1968
- Pegylis gracilis Burgeon, 1946
- Pegylis hauseri Brenske, 1898
- Pegylis kenyensis Decelle, 1968
- Pegylis kigonserana Moser, 1919
- Pegylis lindiana Moser, 1919
- Pegylis lineata Lacroix, 2008
- Pegylis lukulediana Moser, 1919
- Pegylis maculipennis Lansberge, 1882
- Pegylis majori Sehnal, 2017
- Pegylis mashuna (Péringuey, 1904)
- Pegylis microchaeta Moser, 1919
- Pegylis morio Blanchard, 1851
- Pegylis murphyi Lacroix, 2013
- Pegylis neumanni Kolbe, 1894
- Pegylis pilosa Lacroix, 2008
- Pegylis pondoensis Arrow, 1943
- Pegylis rufolineata Kolbe, 1894
- Pegylis rufomaculata Linell, 1896
- Pegylis salaama Brenske, 1898
- Pegylis salernei Lacroix, 2008
- Pegylis sommeri (Burmeister, 1855)
- Pegylis tchadensis Lacroix, 2008
- Pegylis tenuitarsis (Fairmaire, 1887)
- Pegylis uelensis (Burgeon, 1946)
- Pegylis ugandensis Lacroix, 2008
- Pegylis usambarae Brenske, 1898
- Pegylis vestita Brenske, 1895
- Pegylis vittata (Fåhraeus, 1857)
- Pegylis werneri Lacroix, 2008
- Pegylis zavattarii Gridelli, 1939
