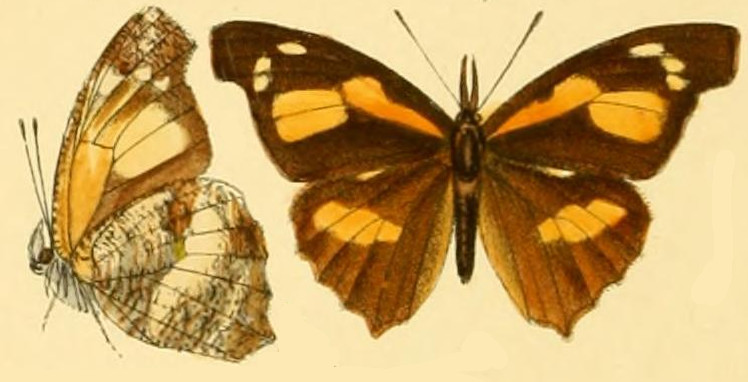

Scientific classification
- Kingdom: Animalia
- Phylum: Arthropoda
- Class: Insecta
- Order: Lepidoptera
- Family: Nymphalidae
- Genus: Libythea
- Species: L. tsiandava

Binomial name
- Libythea tsiandava Grose-Smith, 1891

Synonyms
- Libythea labdaca tsiandava

= Libythea tsiandava =

Species of butterfly

Libythea tsiandava is a butterfly in the family Nymphalidae. It is found in Madagascar. The habitat consists of deciduous and humid lowland forests.
