= Caloptilia celtina =

Scientific classification
- Kingdom: Animalia
- Phylum: Arthropoda
- Class: Insecta
- Order: Lepidoptera
- Family: Gracillariidae
- Genus: Caloptilia
- Species: C. celtina

Binomial name
- Caloptilia celtina Vári, 1961

Synonyms
- Caloptilia argyrochroma Vári, 1961

Species of moth

Caloptilia celtina is a moth of the family Gracillariidae. It is known from South Africa.

The larvae feed on Celtis africana. They mine the leaves of their host plant.
