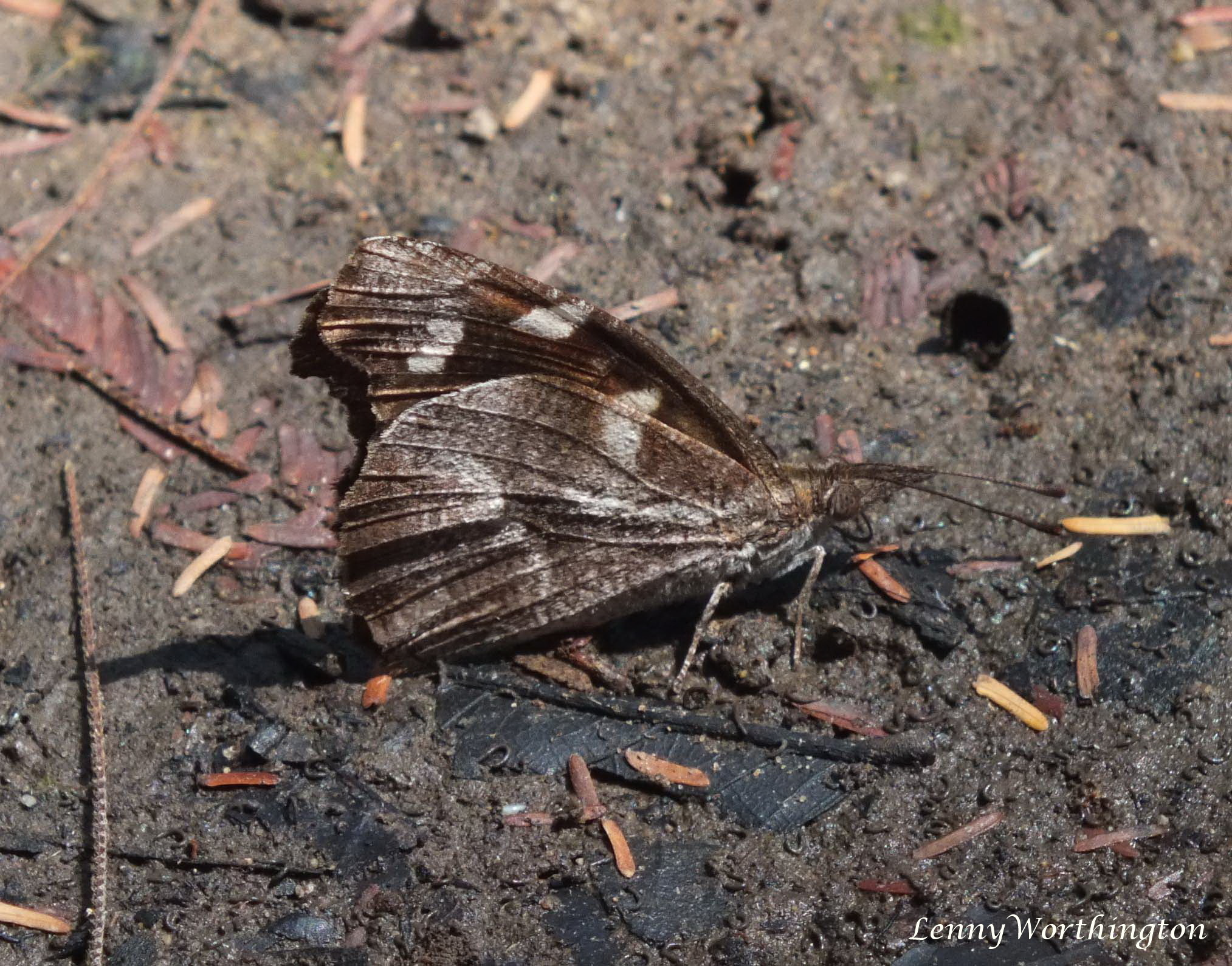

Scientific classification
- Kingdom: Animalia
- Phylum: Arthropoda
- Class: Insecta
- Order: Lepidoptera
- Family: Nymphalidae
- Genus: Libythea
- Species: L. narina

Binomial name
- Libythea narina Godart, 1819

= Libythea narina =

Whitespotted beak

Species of butterfly

Libythea narina, the whitespotted beak, is a butterfly found in India that belongs to the Libytheinae group of the brush-footed butterflies family.

== See also ==
- List of butterflies of India
- List of butterflies of India (Nymphalidae)
