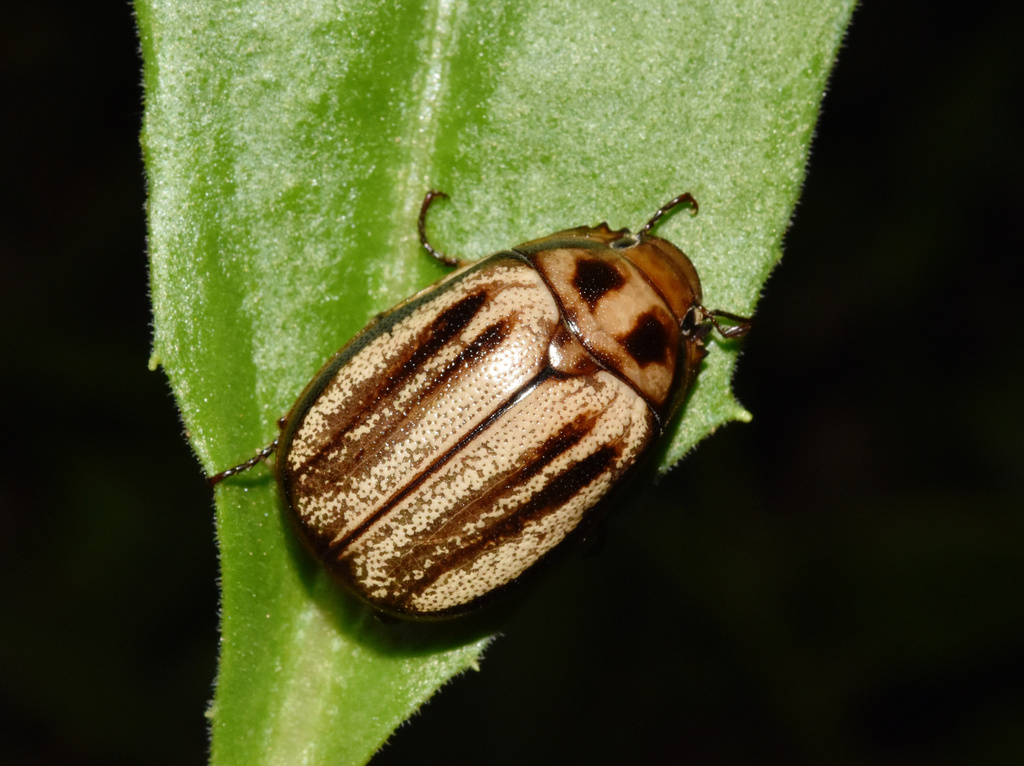

Scientific classification
- Kingdom: Animalia
- Phylum: Arthropoda
- Clade: Pancrustacea
- Class: Insecta
- Order: Coleoptera
- Suborder: Polyphaga
- Infraorder: Scarabaeiformia
- Family: Scarabaeidae
- Tribe: Melolonthini
- Genus: Pegylis
- Species: P. vittata

Binomial name
- Pegylis vittata (Fåhraeus, 1857)

Synonyms
- Hypopholis vittata Fåhraeus, 1857; Hypopholis vittata atrata Machatschke, 1955

= Pegylis vittata =

Species of beetle

Pegylis vittata is a species of beetle of the family Scarabaeidae. It is found in Eswatini, Mozambique, South Africa (Eastern Cape, KwaZulu-Natal, Mpumalanga, Limpopo), Lesotho, Tanzania, Zambia and Zimbabwe.

== Description ==
Adults reach a length of about 16–18 mm (0.63–0.71 in) for males and 16–17 mm (0.63–0.67 in) for females. The pronotum has four black bands and the elytra are pale brown. Each elytron may have three black bands, but these may merge to completely black in dark specimens.

== Life history ==
They have been recorded feeding on Acacia species and Saccharum officinarum.
