= Pegylis hauseri =

Scientific classification
- Kingdom: Animalia
- Phylum: Arthropoda
- Clade: Pancrustacea
- Class: Insecta
- Order: Coleoptera
- Suborder: Polyphaga
- Infraorder: Scarabaeiformia
- Family: Scarabaeidae
- Tribe: Melolonthini
- Genus: Pegylis
- Species: P. hauseri

Binomial name
- Pegylis hauseri Brenske, 1898

Species of beetle

Pegylis hauseri is a species of beetle of the family Scarabaeidae. It is found in Kenya and Tanzania.

== Description ==
Adults reach a length of about 14 mm (0.55 in). The clypeus is not tapered anteriorly, but rather straight and truncate, very slightly emarginate. On the frons, behind the suture, it is very densely punctate. The pronotum gradually widens laterally towards the rear, becoming less indented posteriorly, with distinctly rounded hind angles, finely but more distinctly pubescent, and depressed in the middle. On the elytra, the lighter spots are more extensive, almost displacing the dark areas. The thorax is sparsely pubescent.
