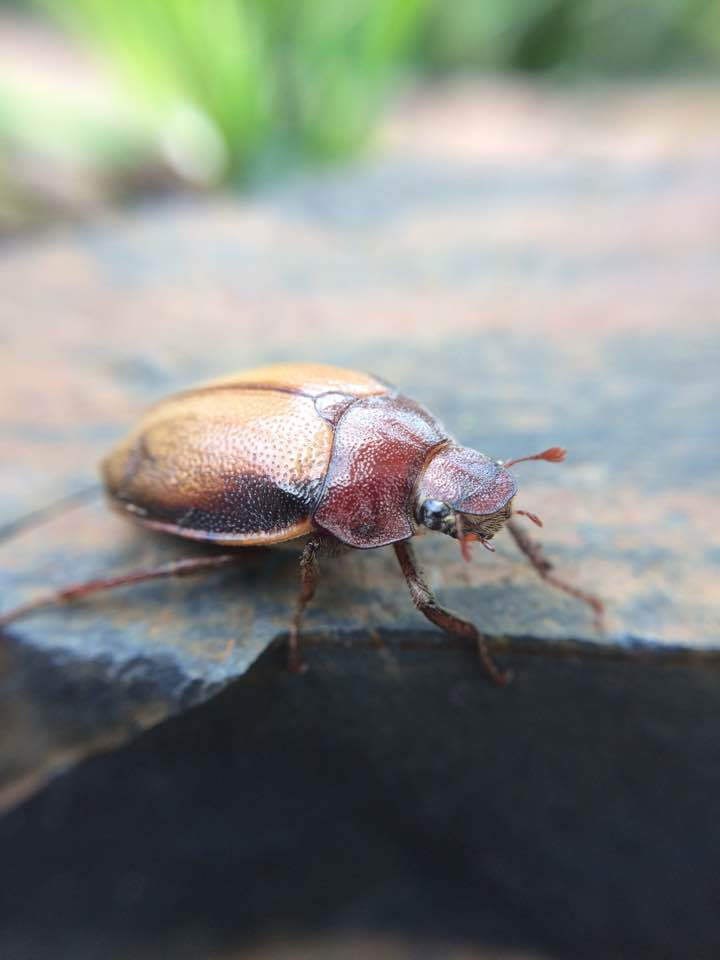

Scientific classification
- Kingdom: Animalia
- Phylum: Arthropoda
- Clade: Pancrustacea
- Class: Insecta
- Order: Coleoptera
- Suborder: Polyphaga
- Infraorder: Scarabaeiformia
- Family: Scarabaeidae
- Tribe: Melolonthini
- Genus: Pegylis
- Species: P. sommeri

Binomial name
- Pegylis sommeri (Burmeister, 1855)

Synonyms
- Hypopholis sommeri Burmeister, 1855; Hypopholis sulcicollis Boheman, 1857

= Pegylis sommeri =

Species of beetle

Pegylis sommeri, the rose chafer or large wattle chafer, is a species of beetle of the family Scarabaeidae. It is found in South Africa (Eastern Cape, Western Cape, Gauteng, Mpumalanga, North West, Limpopo, KwaZulu-Natal), Eswatini, Mozambique, Zambia and Zimbabwe.

== Description ==
Adults reach a length of about 17–19 mm (0.67–0.75 in) for males and 18–19 mm (0.71–0.75 in) for females. The head, pronotum and scutellum range from brown to almost metallic black, while the elytra are lighter with a dark brown or black band above the outer lateral edge.

== Life history ==
They have been collected from various plant species, including Acacia, Eucalyptus and sugarcane.
