= Pegylis genieri =

Scientific classification
- Kingdom: Animalia
- Phylum: Arthropoda
- Clade: Pancrustacea
- Class: Insecta
- Order: Coleoptera
- Suborder: Polyphaga
- Infraorder: Scarabaeiformia
- Family: Scarabaeidae
- Tribe: Melolonthini
- Genus: Pegylis
- Species: P. genieri

Binomial name
- Pegylis genieri Lacroix & Montreuil, 2017

Species of beetle

Pegylis genieri is a species of beetle of the family Scarabaeidae. It is found in Mozambique.

== Description ==
Adults reach a length of about 14 mm (0.55 in). The forebody is fairly uniform reddish-brown, while the elytra are straw-yellow with large, more or less abundant, dark brown spots. The upper surface has fine, but clearly visible hairs.

== Etymology ==
The species is dedicated to François Génier, specialist in coprophagous Scarabaeidae.
