= Pegylis conspurcata =

Scientific classification
- Kingdom: Animalia
- Phylum: Arthropoda
- Clade: Pancrustacea
- Class: Insecta
- Order: Coleoptera
- Suborder: Polyphaga
- Infraorder: Scarabaeiformia
- Family: Scarabaeidae
- Tribe: Melolonthini
- Genus: Pegylis
- Species: P. conspurcata

Binomial name
- Pegylis conspurcata (Gerstaecker, 1867)

Synonyms
- Hypopholis conspurcata Gerstaecker, 1867

Species of beetle

Pegylis conspurcata is a species of beetle of the family Scarabaeidae. It is found in Kenya, Tanzania and Zimbabwe.

== Description ==
Adults reach a length of about 14.5–15.5 mm (0.57–0.61 in). They are testaceous-red and moderately shining. Each puncture on the upper side has a minute greyish hair. The propygidium, pygidium, abdomen and legs are clothed with small, appressed greyish hairs which are slightly denser on the pectus. The head and clypeus are covered with deep, round punctures and the pronotum has similar punctures. The scutellum is strongly punctured and the elytra are covered with deep, nearly foveate punctures separated by raised walls giving them a strongly coriaceous appearance. They are sprinkled with irregular, small, metallic, brown patches, which are, however, often obliterated.
