= Pegylis bennigseni =

Scientific classification
- Kingdom: Animalia
- Phylum: Arthropoda
- Clade: Pancrustacea
- Class: Insecta
- Order: Coleoptera
- Suborder: Polyphaga
- Infraorder: Scarabaeiformia
- Family: Scarabaeidae
- Tribe: Melolonthini
- Genus: Pegylis
- Species: P. bennigseni

Binomial name
- Pegylis bennigseni Brenske, 1898

Species of beetle

Pegylis bennigseni is a species of beetle of the family Scarabaeidae. It is found in Tanzania and the Democratic Republic of the Congo.

== Description ==
Adults reach a length of about 20–21 mm (0.79–0.83 in). They are brown, with the elytra irregularly spotted, differing little in colour from related species. The clypeus is evenly rounded anteriorly, very densely wrinkled and rough-punctate, the suture is not raised, the frons shagreened with distinct coarser punctures. The pronotum is short, the anterior and posterior angles are broadly rounded, much more strongly constricted anteriorly than posteriorly, the lateral margin broadly demarcated, somewhat raised, the surface densely, finely leathery-punctate, with stronger punctures in between, which are more densely spaced laterally. It is very weakly depressed in the middle, more distinct on the sides and anterior margin. The scutellum is heart-shaped, shagreened, and coarsely punctate. The elytra are shagreened, and more densely covered with coarser punctures, each puncture having a tiny white hair at its base. The pygidium is densely, finely wrinkledly punctate, with very short, thin hairs. The abdomen is finely punctate and short-pubescent, not more densely pubescent than the pygidium.
