= Pegylis mashuna =

Scientific classification
- Kingdom: Animalia
- Phylum: Arthropoda
- Clade: Pancrustacea
- Class: Insecta
- Order: Coleoptera
- Suborder: Polyphaga
- Infraorder: Scarabaeiformia
- Family: Scarabaeidae
- Tribe: Melolonthini
- Genus: Pegylis
- Species: P. mashuna

Binomial name
- Pegylis mashuna (Péringuey, 1904)

Synonyms
- Pegylidius mashunus Péringuey, 1904

Species of beetle

Pegylis mashuna is a species of beetle of the family Scarabaeidae. It is found in Mozambique and Zimbabwe.

== Description ==
Adults reach a length of about 20–21 mm (0.79–0.83 in). They are reddish-brown, with a faint bronze sheen forming on the elytra faint, irregular macules of that hue. The antennae and palpi are flavescent and the underside is chestnut-brown.
