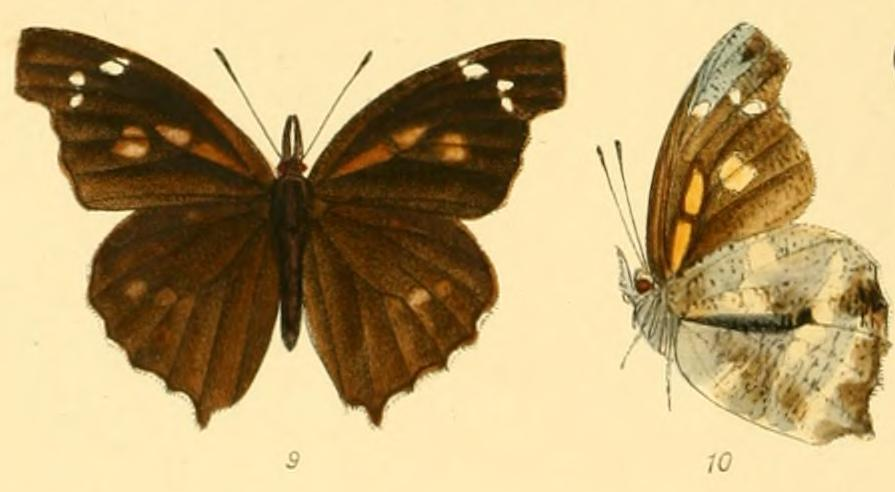

Scientific classification
- Domain: Eukaryota
- Kingdom: Animalia
- Phylum: Arthropoda
- Class: Insecta
- Order: Lepidoptera
- Family: Nymphalidae
- Genus: Libythea
- Species: L. ancoata

Binomial name
- Libythea ancoata Grose-Smith, 1891

Synonyms
- Libythea labdaca ancoata

= Libythea ancoata =

Species of butterfly

Libythea ancoata is a butterfly in the family Nymphalidae. It is found along the north-west coast of Madagascar.
