= Pegylis salaama =

Scientific classification
- Kingdom: Animalia
- Phylum: Arthropoda
- Clade: Pancrustacea
- Class: Insecta
- Order: Coleoptera
- Suborder: Polyphaga
- Infraorder: Scarabaeiformia
- Family: Scarabaeidae
- Tribe: Melolonthini
- Genus: Pegylis
- Species: P. salaama

Binomial name
- Pegylis salaama Brenske, 1898

Species of beetle

Pegylis salaama is a species of beetle of the family Scarabaeidae. It is found in Tanzania.

== Description ==
Adults reach a length of about 14 mm (0.55 in). The clypeus is almost uniformly semicircular without a bulge, and very densely punctate. The frons is densely punctate, but not more so in the middle than on the sides. The pronotum is dully punctate, the hairs obliquely appressed, interspersed at the sides. The sides are widest behind the middle, the posterior angles less rounded, the middle scarcely impressed. The scutellum is rounded, not heart-shaped. The elytra are coarsely punctate, the hairs short but distinct, with a rounded, lighter spot posteriorly. The pygidium is rounded, almost truncate.
