= Pegylis gestroi =

Scientific classification
- Kingdom: Animalia
- Phylum: Arthropoda
- Clade: Pancrustacea
- Class: Insecta
- Order: Coleoptera
- Suborder: Polyphaga
- Infraorder: Scarabaeiformia
- Family: Scarabaeidae
- Tribe: Melolonthini
- Genus: Pegylis
- Species: P. gestroi

Binomial name
- Pegylis gestroi Brenske, 1895

Species of beetle

Pegylis gestroi is a species of beetle of the family Scarabaeidae. It is found in Ethiopia, Kenya and Somalia.

== Description ==
Adults reach a length of about 16 mm (0.63 in). The head is leathery, finely rugulose-punctate, not emarginate, with a raised suture. The thorax covered with minute hairs and the elytra are evenly rugulose-punctate, finely hairy, spotted with reddish. The pygidium and abdomen are clothed in grey, the latter is also lightly spotted at the sides. They are similar to Pegylis maculipennis. However, in that species, the clypeus is slightly sinuate, the frons is carinate, and the pronotum, scutellum, and elytra are leathery. Furthermore, maculipennis differs in size, measuring 22 mm (0.87 in) in length and 10 mm (0.39 in) in width, which results in a different, much narrower body shape.

== Etymology ==
The species is named in honour of the Italian entomologist Raffaello Gestro.
