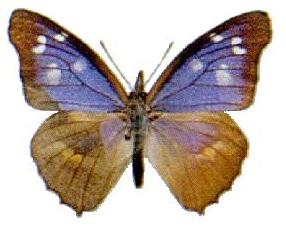

Scientific classification
- Kingdom: Animalia
- Phylum: Arthropoda
- Class: Insecta
- Order: Lepidoptera
- Family: Nymphalidae
- Genus: Libythea
- Species: L. geoffroy

Binomial name
- Libythea geoffroy Godart, [1824]

Synonyms
- Libythea geoffroyi; Libythea antipoda Boisduval, 1859; Libythea quadrinotata Butler, 1877; Libythea batchiana Wallace, 1869; Libythea ceramensis Wallace, 1869; Libythea pulchra Butler, 1882; Libythea orientalis Godman & Salvin, 1888; Libythea geoffroyi var. philippina Staudinger, 1889; Libythea nicevillei Olliff, 1891; Libythea hauxwelli Moore, 1901; Libythea genia Waterhouse, 1938

= Libythea geoffroy =

Purple beak

Species of butterfly

Libythea geoffroy, the purple beak, is a butterfly found in parts of India and Myanmar that belongs to the subfamily Libytheinae of the family Nymphalidae.

== Description ==
Race alompra, Moore. Male upperside is pale brown. Forewing: the cell, basal two-thirds of interspaces 1a, 1, 2 and 3, and the extreme base of interspace 4 suffused with a beautiful pale violescent blue; a curved series of three subquadrate preapical white spots. Hindwing: cell suffused with violescent blue extending faintly into interspaces 4, 5 and 6; a faintly-marked dull orange band below the lower apex of cell. Underside pale brown. If ore wing: apex grey, irrorated with minute dark spots; cell with a broad dull orange streak from base, followed by a violescent transverse spot in apex of cell; a large discal dull violescent spot in interspace 2 spreading slightly into interspace 3,. the curved series of three preapical spots as on the upperside but faintly dull violescent. Hindwing greyish brown, irrorated with dark spots and transverse dark striae and shaded with darker brown; the medial dull orange band replaced by a similar pale well-marked baud. Antennae, head and abdomen pale brown; thorax darker brown with a little greenish pubescence posteriorly; beneath, the palpi, thorax and abdomen pale greyish brown.

Female upperside: forewing with the violet area duller and confined to the immediate base of the wing; a quadrate white spot at the end of the discoidal cell; a tripartite subcostal spot; another elongated spot from the third median to the upper discoidal nervule, placed outwardly below it; a large quadrate discal spot, completely tilling the interspace between the first and third median nervules. Hindwing with no violet gloss at the base, otherwise as in the male. Underside: forewing with the cell orange but outwardly terminated by a large white spot; the other spots as on the upperside Hindwing as in the male, but all the markings mores obscure. (After Lionel de Nicéville)

== Subspecies ==
- L. g. geoffroy (Java, Bali, Lombok, Sumbawa, Timor, Wetar)
- L. g. antipoda Boisduval, 1859 (New Caledonia, Loyalty Islands)
- L. g. batchiana Wallace, 1869 (Obi, Bachan, Halmahera)
- L. g. ceramensis Wallace, 1869 (Ambon, Serang)
- L. g. pulchra Butler, 1882 (New Britain, Duke of York, New Ireland)
- L. g. orientalis Godman & Salvin, 1888 (Guadalcanal)
- L. g. philippina Staudinger, 1889 (Palawan)
- L. g. celebensis Staudinger, 1889 (Sulawesi, Banggai)
- L. g. nicevillei Olliff, 1891 (Cape York to Cairns)
- L. g. sumbensis Pagenstecher, 1896 (Sumba)
- L. g. neopommerana Pagenstecher, 1896
- L. g. alompra Moore, 1901 (Burma, Borneo)
- L. g. deminuta Fruhstorfer, 1909 (Dammer, Babber, Wetter)
- L. g. maenia Fruhstorfer, 1909 (Waigeu, West Irina - Papua, Yule)
- L. g. eugenia Fruhstorfer, 1909 (Kai Island)
- L. g. genia Waterhouse, 1938 (north-western Australia)
- L. g. howarthi Petersen, 1968 (Rennell Island)
- L. g. eborinus Samson, 1980 (Solomons: San Cristobal)
