= Pegylis usambarae =

Scientific classification
- Kingdom: Animalia
- Phylum: Arthropoda
- Clade: Pancrustacea
- Class: Insecta
- Order: Coleoptera
- Suborder: Polyphaga
- Infraorder: Scarabaeiformia
- Family: Scarabaeidae
- Tribe: Melolonthini
- Genus: Pegylis
- Species: P. usambarae

Binomial name
- Pegylis usambarae Brenske, 1898

Species of beetle

Pegylis usambarae is a species of beetle of the family Scarabaeidae. It is found in Tanzania.

== Description ==
Adults reach a length of about 13 mm (0.51 in). They are brown. The pronotum and elytra are not shagreened, the minute punctures are so fine and indistinct that the impression of leatheriness is not created, the surface rather appears shiny. The pronotum is widely punctate, slightly depressed in the middle, slightly drawn in posteriorly at the sides, the hind angles rounded, the anterior angles somewhat more pointed. The elytra are strongly punctate with minute hairs in the punctures. The pygidium is finely pubescent.
