= Pegylis lukulediana =

Scientific classification
- Kingdom: Animalia
- Phylum: Arthropoda
- Clade: Pancrustacea
- Class: Insecta
- Order: Coleoptera
- Suborder: Polyphaga
- Infraorder: Scarabaeiformia
- Family: Scarabaeidae
- Tribe: Melolonthini
- Genus: Pegylis
- Species: P. lukulediana

Binomial name
- Pegylis lukulediana Moser, 1919

Species of beetle

Pegylis lukulediana is a species of beetle of the family Scarabaeidae. It is found in Mozambique and Tanzania.

== Description ==
Adults reach a length of about 22–24 mm. They are similar to Pegylis neumanni. They are blackish-brown and glossy, the elytra spotted with brown. The head is densely covered with fine punctures, interspersed with coarser punctures. The pronotum is similarly shaped and sculpted as in neumanni and the wrinkling of the elytra is somewhat coarser.
