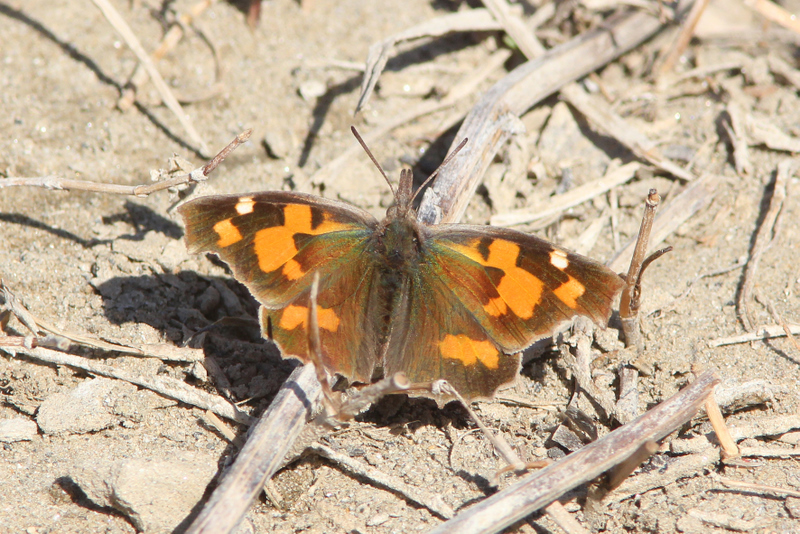
- France
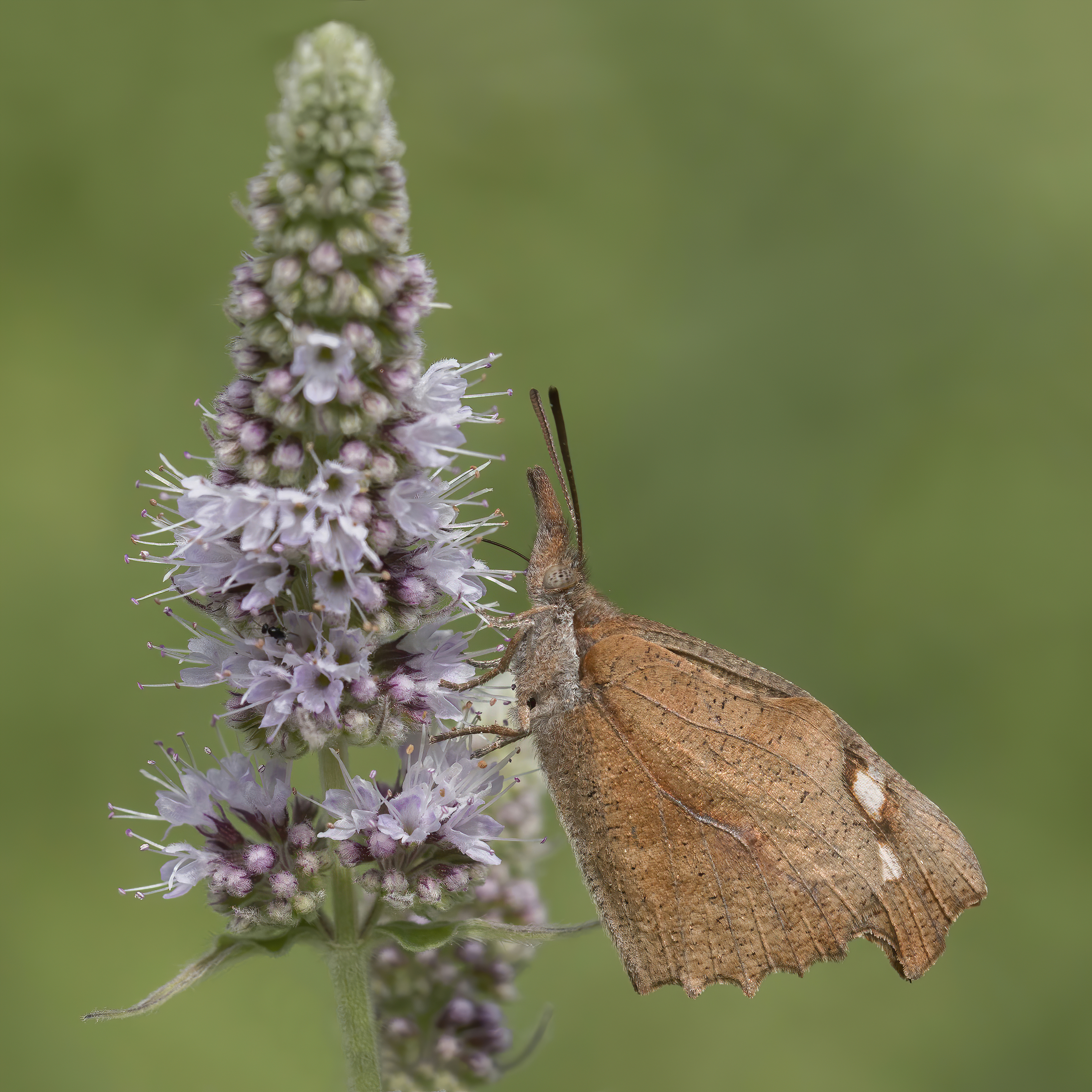
- on mint, Bulgaria

Scientific classification
- Domain: Eukaryota
- Kingdom: Animalia
- Phylum: Arthropoda
- Class: Insecta
- Order: Lepidoptera
- Family: Nymphalidae
- Genus: Libythea
- Species: L. celtis

Binomial name
- Libythea celtis (Laicharting, 1782)

= Libythea celtis =

European beak

Species of butterfly

Libythea celtis, the European beak or nettle-tree butterfly, is a butterfly of the Libytheinae group of the brush-footed butterflies family.

== Description ==
The upperside ground colour is rich silky brown. The forewing has the cell filled with a broad orange-yellow streak which is subapically deeply indented above; a small discal orange-yellow spot present in interspace 1; a much larger, similarly coloured discal spot between veins 2 and 4, on the inner side touching the cell between veins 3 and 4; a subcostal white preapical spot and a quadrate double spot in interspaces 4 and 5, placed obliquely forward to the subcostal spot; this spot whitish above, orange below. Hindwing uniform, with an irregular curved, transverse, upper postdiscal orange patch extending from just below vein 3 to interspace 6, the portion in interspace 6 often detached. Underside ground colour: forewing brown, apex pale purplish irrorated (sprinkled) with minute dark transverse striae and dots, orange markings as on the upperside but paler; hindwing uniform pale purplish irrorated with minute dark dots and transverse striae. Antennae, head, thorax and abdomen dark brown; beneath, palpi, thorax and abdomen concolorous with the tint of the underside of the hindwing.

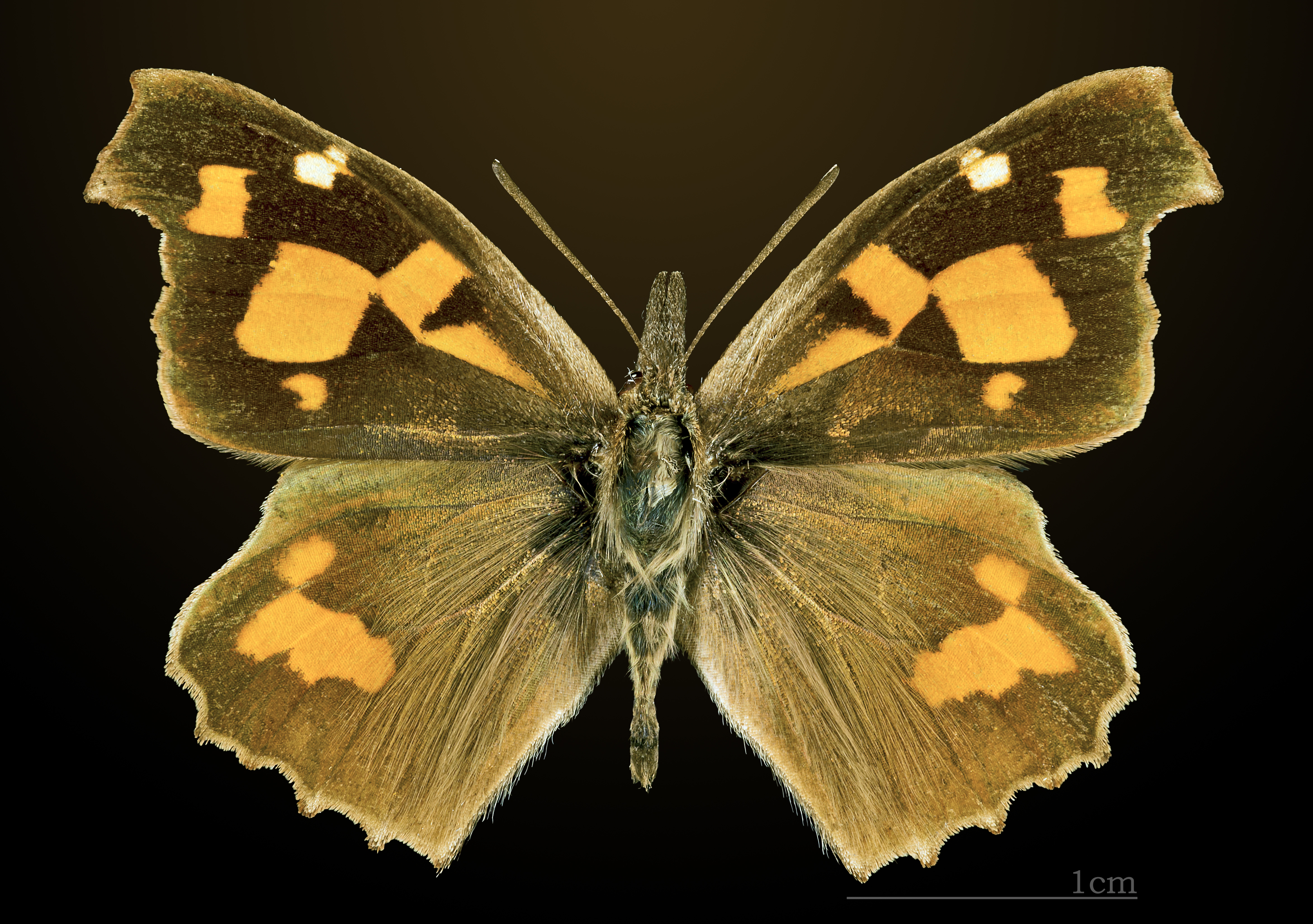
Dorsal side

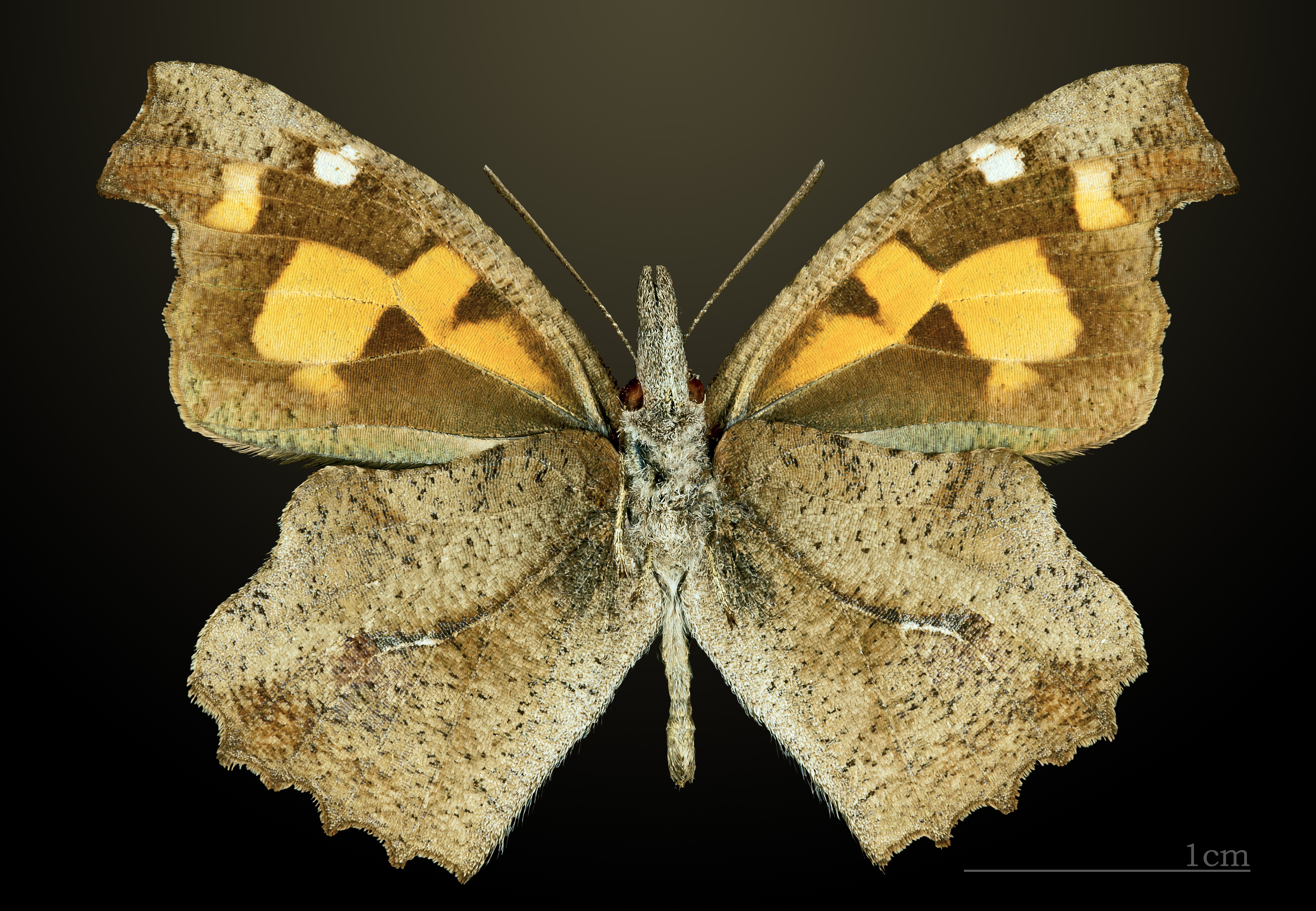
Ventral side

== Range ==
Its range is southern Europe, Asia Minor, Central Asia and the Chitral ranges of Pakistan.

== Biology ==
The larva feeds on Celtis australis.
