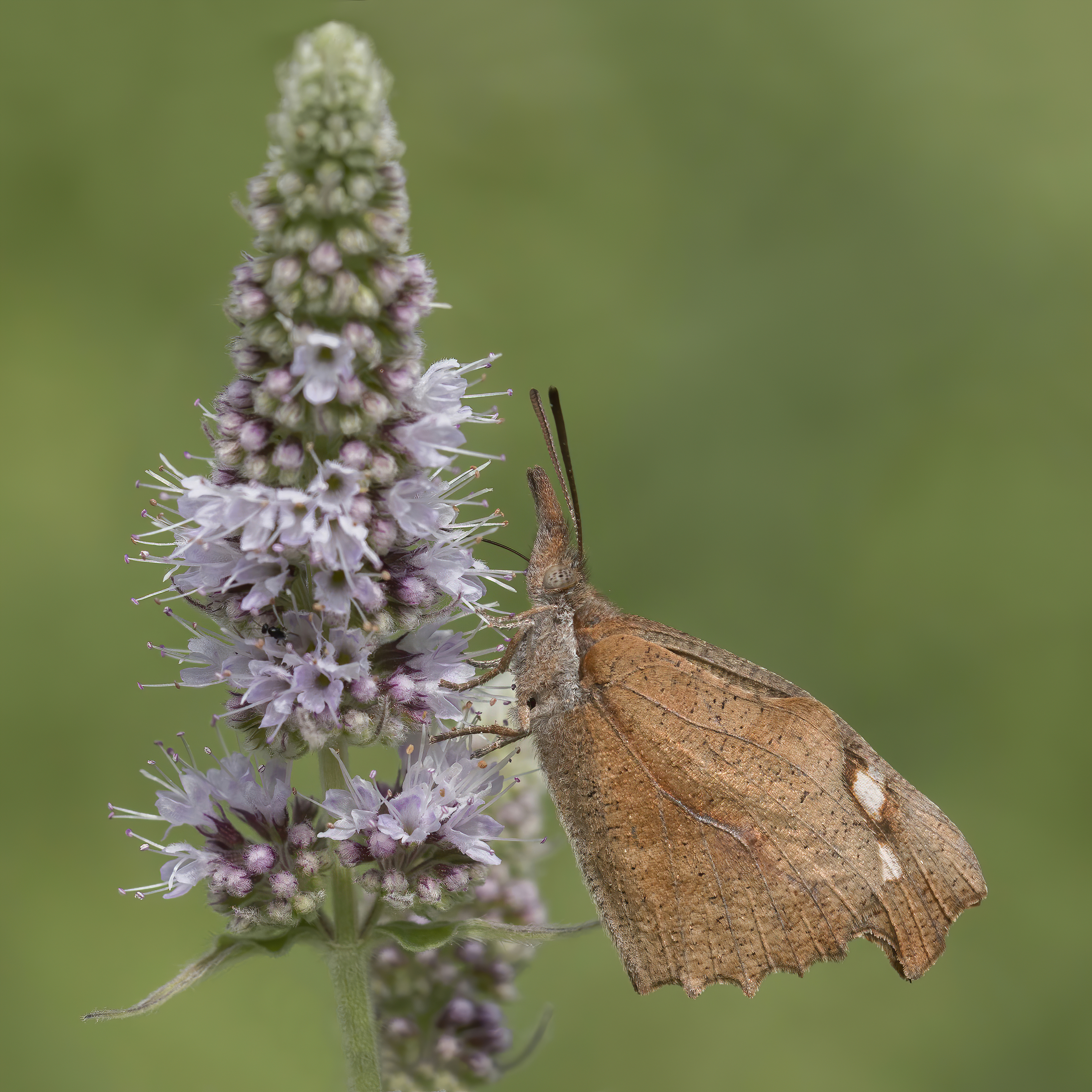
- Libythea celtis

Scientific classification
- Kingdom: Animalia
- Phylum: Arthropoda
- Class: Insecta
- Order: Lepidoptera
- Family: Nymphalidae
- Subfamily: Libytheinae
- Genus: Libythea; Fabricius, 1807

Species
- See text

= Libythea =

Genus of brush-footed butterflies

Libythea is a widespread genus of nymphalid butterflies commonly called beaks or snouts. They are strong fliers and may even be migratory.

== Classification ==
- Source: The higher classification of Nymphalidae, at Nymphalidae.net
- Note: Names preceded by an equal sign (=) are synonyms, homonyms, rejected names or invalid names.

Subfamily Libytheinae Boisduval, 1833

- Libythea Fabricius, 1807 (= Hecaerge Ochsenheimer, 1816; = Chilea Billberg, 1820; = Hypatus Hübner, 1822; = Libythaeus Boitard, 1828; = Dichora Scudder, 1889)
  - Libythea geoffroy Godart, 1824
    - Libythea geoffroy geoffroy Godart, 1824
    - Libythea geoffroy alompra Moore, 1901 (= Libythea hauxwelli Moore, 1901)
    - Libythea geoffroy antipoda Boisduval, 1859 (= Libythea quadrinotata Butler, 1877)
    - Libythea geoffroy bardas Fruhstorfer, 1914
    - Libythea geoffroy batchiana Wallace, 1869
    - Libythea geoffroy celebensis Staudinger, 1859
    - Libythea geoffroy ceramensis Wallace, 1869
    - Libythea geoffroy deminuta Fruhstorfer, 1910
    - Libythea geoffroy genia Waterhouse, 1938
    - Libythea geoffroy howarthi Peterson, 1968
    - Libythea geoffroy maenia Fruhstorfer, 1902 (= Libythea geoffroy eugenia Fruhstorfer, 1910)
    - Libythea geoffroy nicevillei Olliff, 1891
    - Libythea geoffroy orientalis Godman & Salvin, 1888
    - Libythea geoffroy philippina Staudinger, 1889
    - Libythea geoffroy pulchra Butler, 1882 (= Libythea neopommerana Pagenstecher, 1896)
    - Libythea geoffroy sumbensis Pagenstecher, 1896
  - Libythea collenettei Poulton & Riley, 1928
  - Libythea narina Godart, 1819
    - Libythea narina narina Godart, 1819 (= Libythea hatami Kenrick, 1911)
    - Libythea narina canuleia Fruhstorfer, 1910
    - Libythea narina luzonica Semper, 1889
    - Libythea narina nahathaka Fruhstorfer, 1914
    - Libythea narina neratia Felder, 1864
    - Libythea narina rohini Marshall, 1880 (= Libythea libera de Niceville, 1890; = Libythea hybrida Martin, 1896; = Libythea tibera Pagenstecher, 1902)
    - Libythea narina sangha Fruhstorfer, 1914
    - Libythea narina sumbawana Fruhstorfer, 1914
  - Libythea labdaca Westwood & Hewitson, 1851
    - Libythea labdaca labdaca Westwood & Hewitson, 1851 (= Libythea labdaca werneri Fruhstrofer, 1903)
    - Libythea labdaca laius Trimen, 1879 (= Libythea labdaca cinyras Trimen, 1866; = Libythea labdaca lepitoides Moore, 1901)
  - Libythea ancoata Grose-Smith, 1891
  - Libythea tsiandava Grose-Smith, 1891
  - Libythea myrrha Godart, 1819
    - Libythea myrrha myrrha Godart, 1819
    - Libythea myrrha borneensis Fruhstorfer, 1914
    - Libythea myrrha carma Fruhstorfer, 1914
    - Libythea myrrha hecura Fruhstorfer, 1914
    - Libythea myrrha myrrhina Fruhstorfer, 1910
    - Libythea myrrha rama Moore, 1872
    - Libythea myrrha sanguinalis Fruhstorfer, 1898
    - Libythea myrrha thira Fruhstorfer, 1914
    - Libythea myrrha yawa Fruhstorfer, 1914
  - Libythea celtis (Fuessly, 1782) (original name = Papilio celtis Fuessly, 1782)
    - Libythea celtis celtis (Fuessly, 1782)
    - Libythea celtis amamiana Shirozu, 1956
    - Libythea celtis celtoides Fruhstorfer, 1909
    - Libythea celtis chinensis Fruhstorfer, 1909
    - Libythea celtis formosana Fruhstorfer, 1909
    - Libythea celtis sophene Fruhstorfer, 1914
  - Libythea cinyras Trimen, 1866
  - Libythea laius Trimen, 1879
    - Libythea laius laius Trimen, 1879
    - Libythea laius lepitoides Moore, 1903
    - Libythea laius tsiandava Grose-Smith 1891
  - Libythea lepita Moore, 1857
