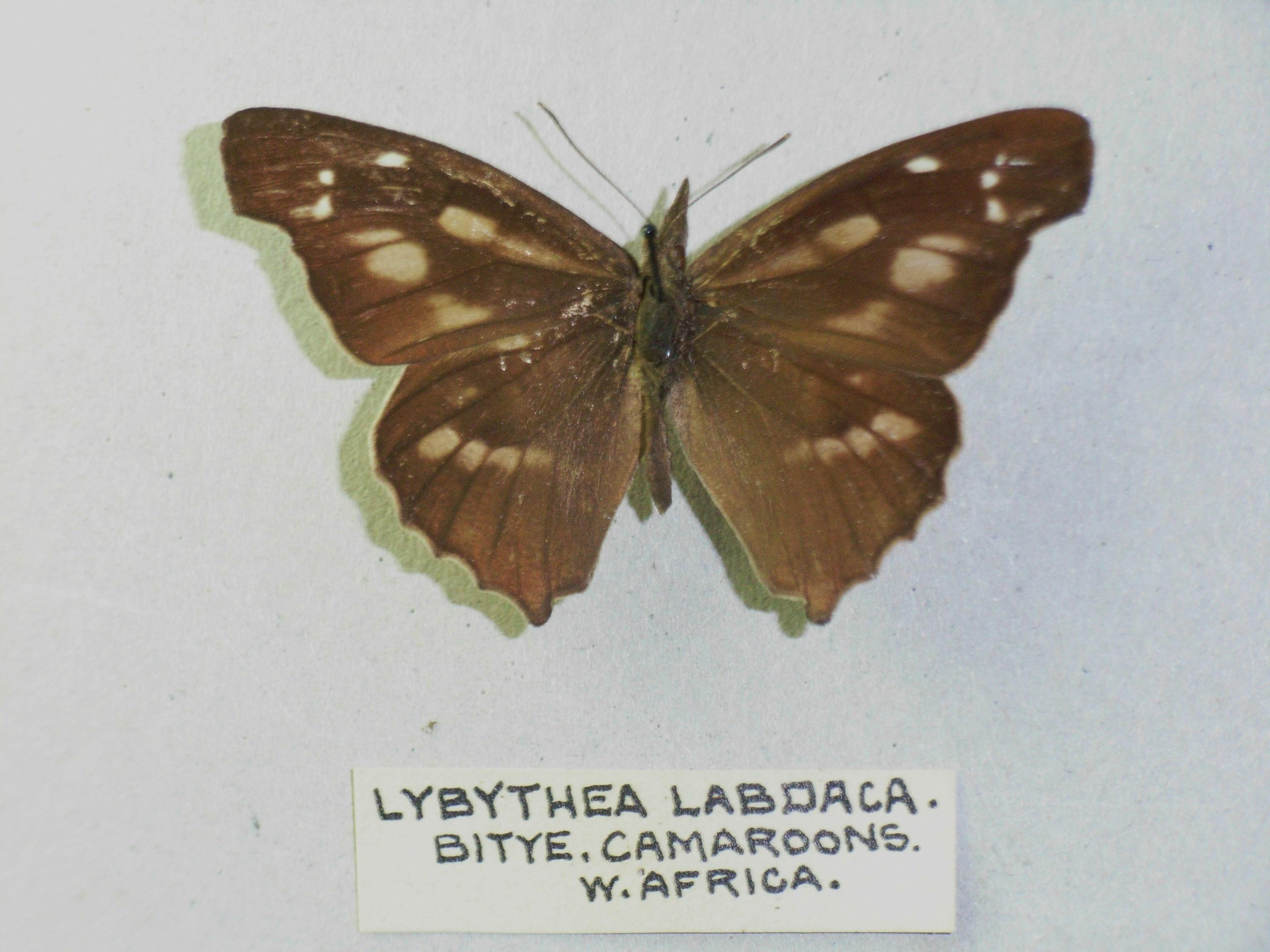

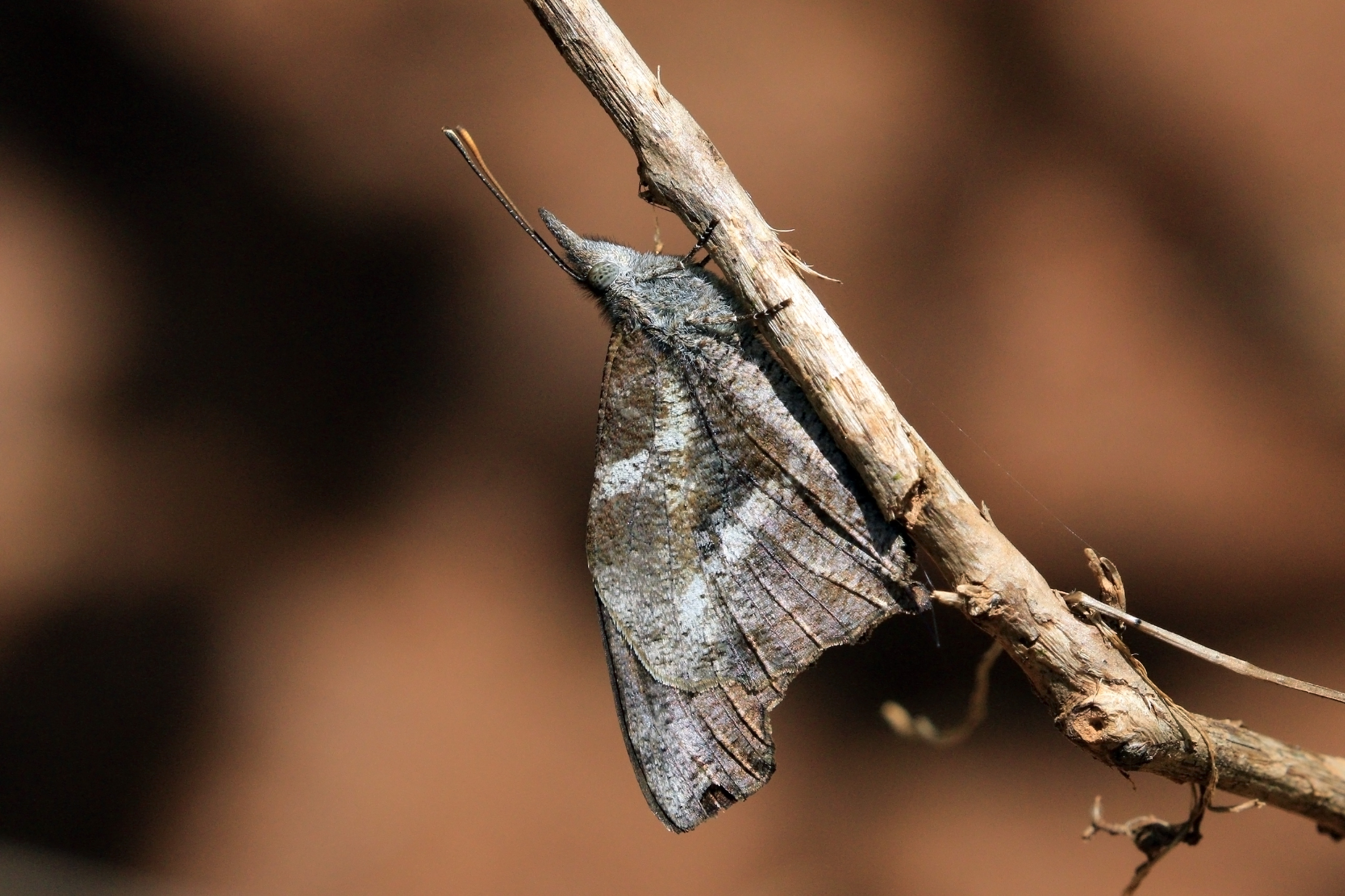
- L. l. labdaca, Kakamega Forest, Kenya

Scientific classification
- Kingdom: Animalia
- Phylum: Arthropoda
- Clade: Pancrustacea
- Class: Insecta
- Order: Lepidoptera
- Family: Nymphalidae
- Genus: Libythea
- Species: L. labdaca

Binomial name
- Libythea labdaca Westwood, 1851

= Libythea labdaca =

African snout butterfly

Species of butterfly

Libythea labdaca, the African snout butterfly, is a member of the butterfly subfamily Libytheinae found in western and central Africa.

It forms vast migratory swarms (over 1 billion butterflies were estimated in Ghana). The butterflies move south in the spring and north in the autumn.

The larvae feed on Celtis species (including C. kraussiana and C. sayauxii).

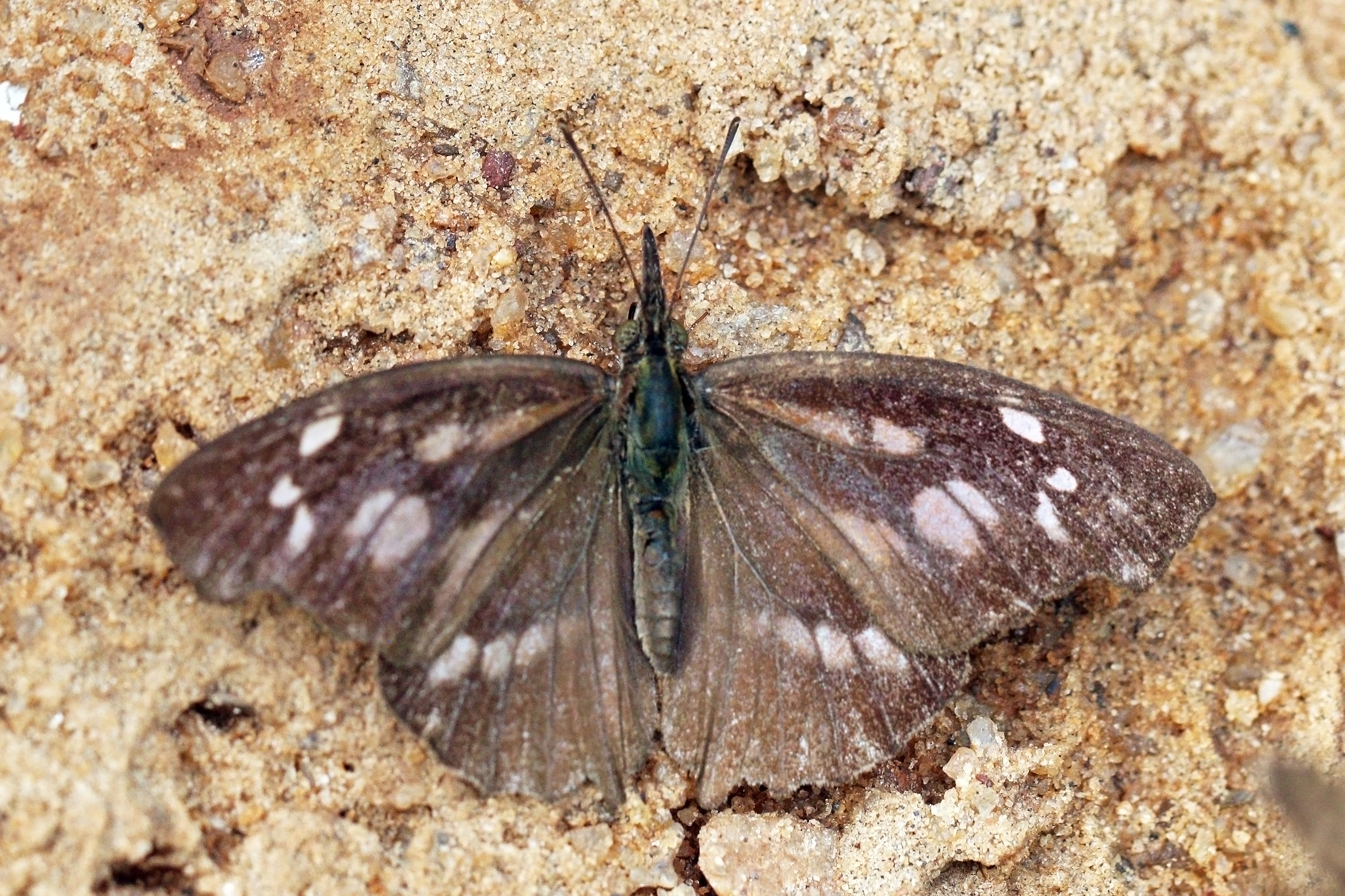
Bobiri Forest, Ghana

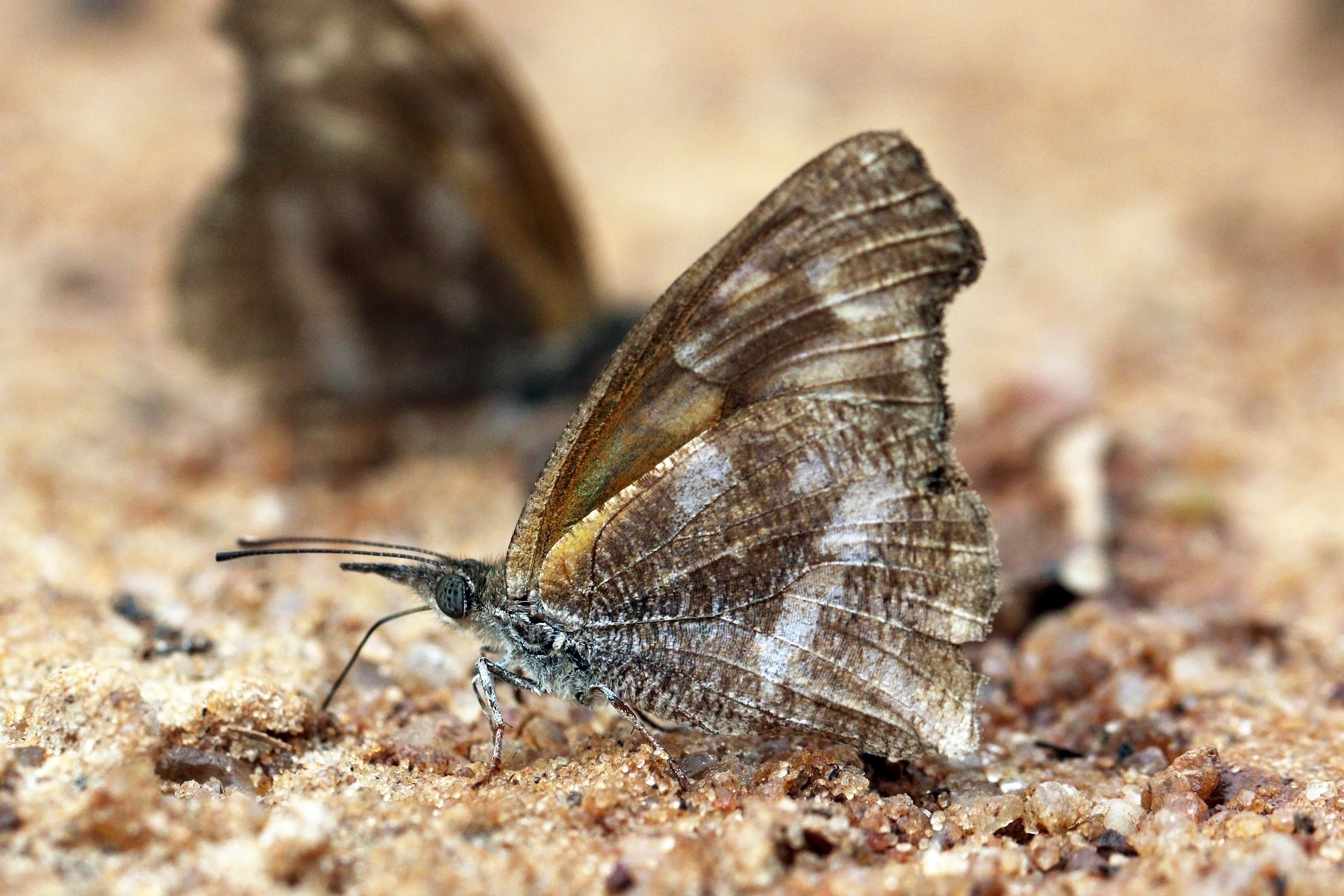
Bobiri Forest, Ghana

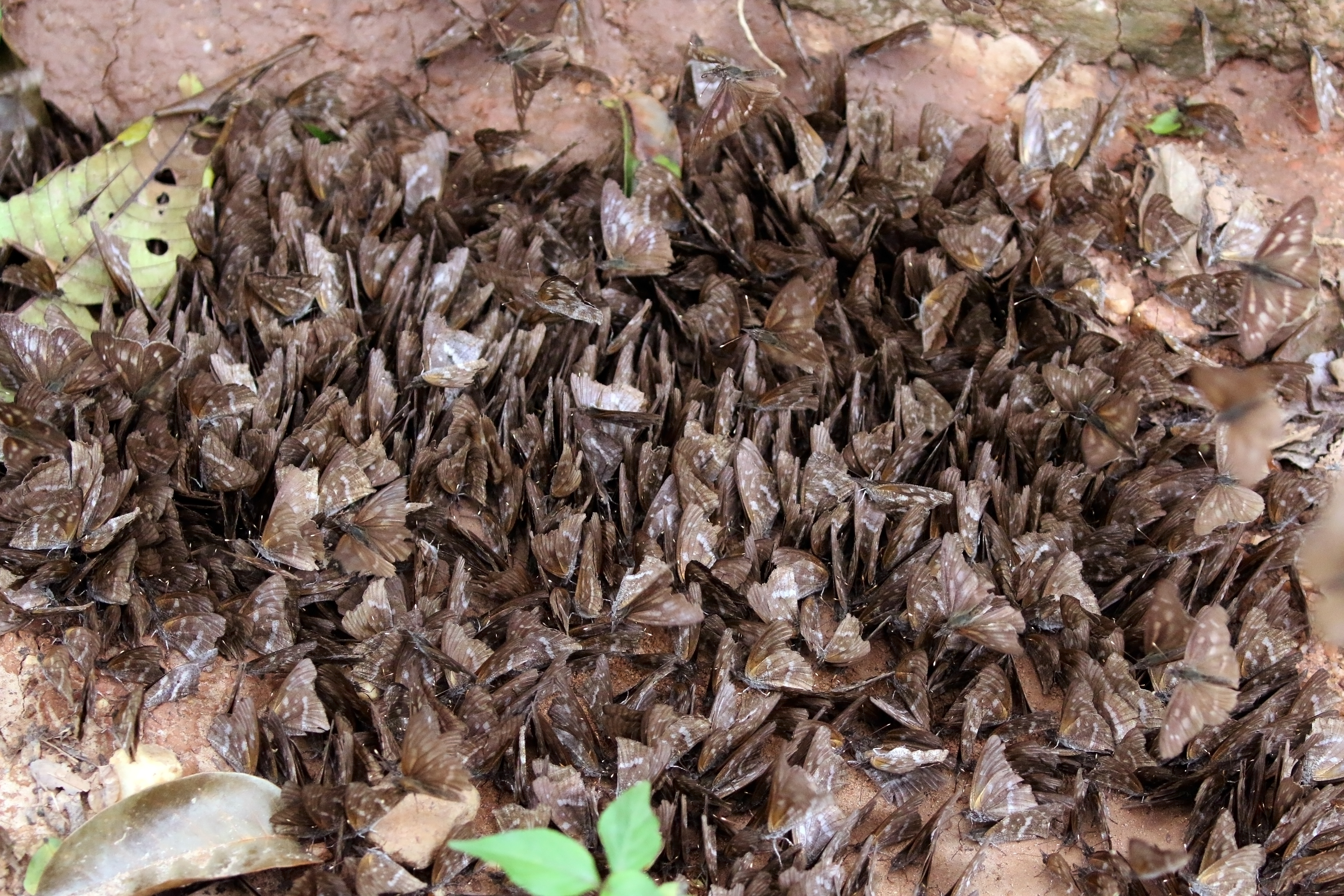
males mud-puddling, Bobiri Forest, Ghana

== Subspecies ==
- Libythea labdaca labdaca (Guinea, Sierra Leone, Liberia, Ivory Coast, Ghana, Togo, Benin, Nigeria, Cameroon, Bioko, São Tomé and Príncipe, Angola, Democratic Republic of the Congo, Uganda, western Kenya, western Tanzania)
- Libythea labdaca laius Trimen, 1879 (Ethiopia, eastern Kenya, eastern and northern Tanzania, Malawi, Zambia, Angola, Mozambique, eastern Zimbabwe, northern Botswana, South Africa, Eswatini)

Torben Larsen developed a species numbering system for his 2005 publication Butterflies of West Africa. The nominate subspecies is #646. The 'Larsen' numbers have since been used with permission in A Sharp Eye on Butterflies of Ghana.

== Sources ==
- Kawahara, A. Y. 2006. Biology of the snout butterflies (Nymphalidae, Libytheinae), Part 1: Libythea Fabricius. Transactions of the Lepidopterological Society of Japan 57:13-33.
- Kawahara, A.Y., 2013: Systematic revision and review of the extant and fossil snout butterflies (Lepidoptera: Nymphalidae: Libytheinae). Zootaxa 3631 (1): 1-74. preview: .
