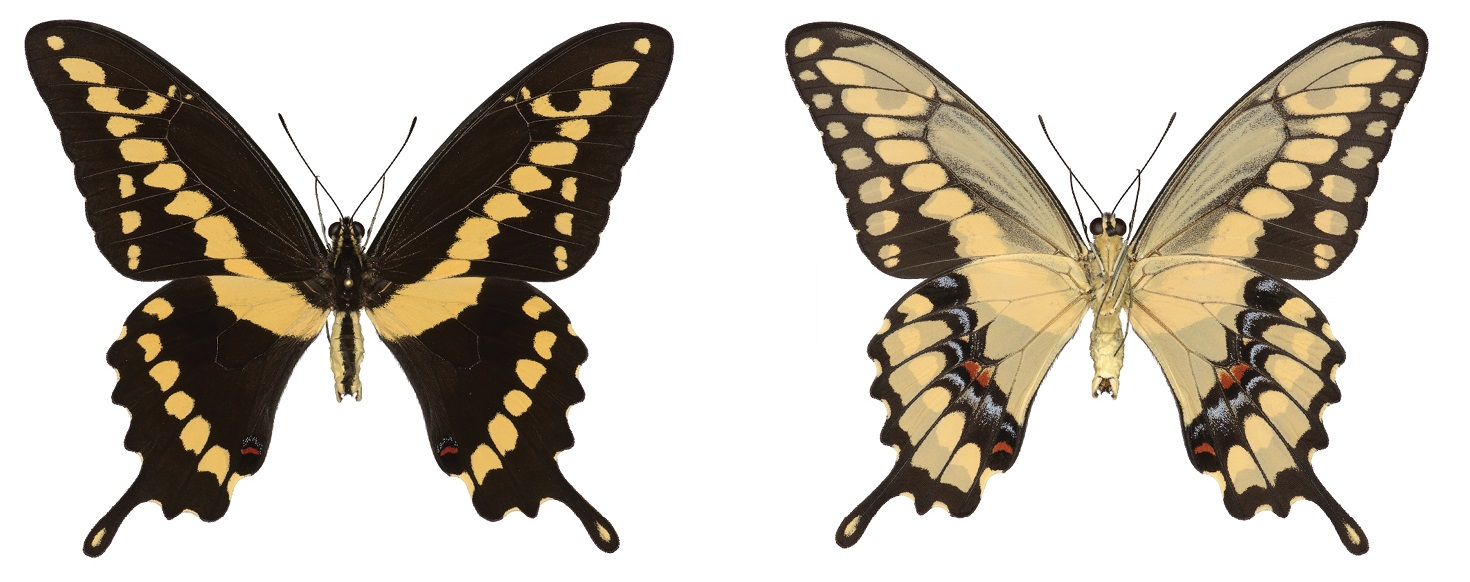
- Holotype male
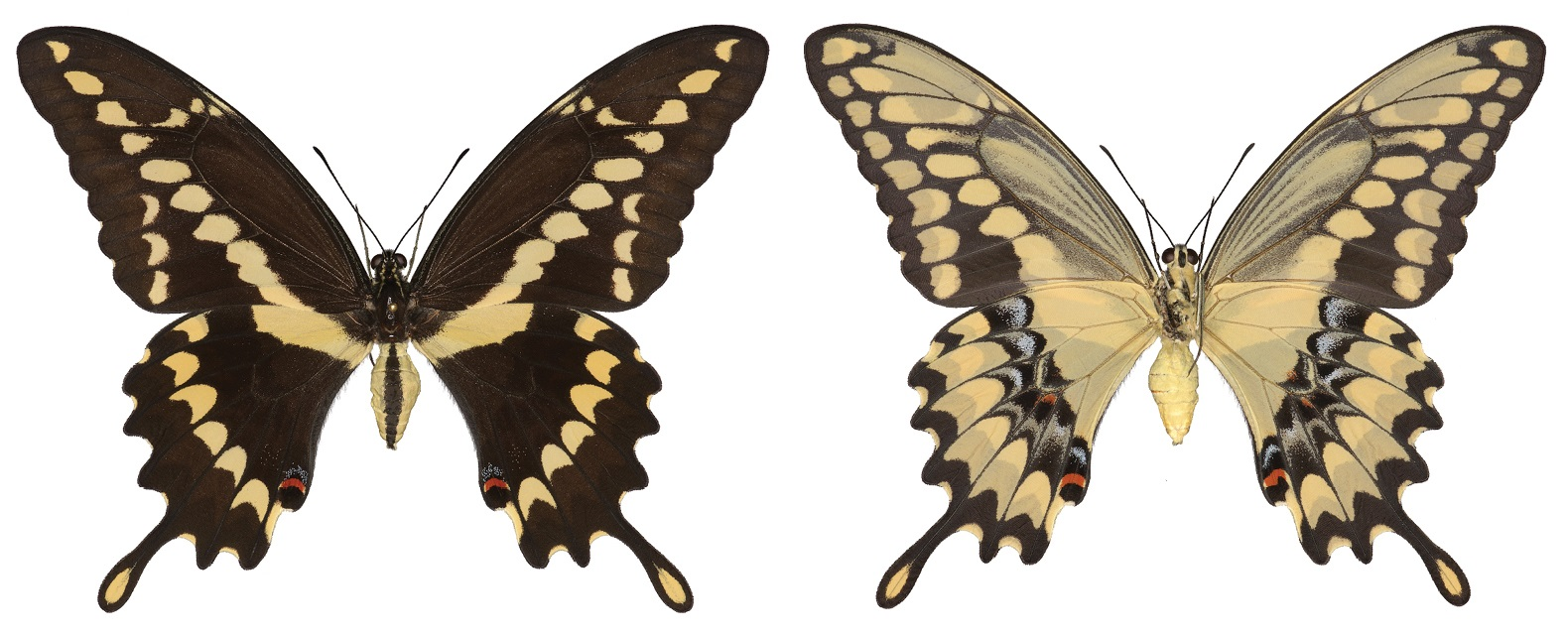
- Paratype female

Conservation status
- Least Concern (IUCN 3.1)

Scientific classification
- Kingdom: Animalia
- Phylum: Arthropoda
- Class: Insecta
- Order: Lepidoptera
- Family: Papilionidae
- Genus: Papilio
- Species: P. rumiko

Binomial name
- Papilio rumiko (Shiraiwa & Grishin, 2014)

Synonyms
- Heraclides rumiko Shiraiwa & Grishin, 2014

= Papilio rumiko =

Western giant swallowtail

Species of butterfly

Papilio rumiko or western giant swallowtail is a species of swallowtail butterfly. It is found from the south-western United States, through Mexico, El Salvador, Honduras, Costa Rica to Panama. The northernmost record is north-eastern Colorado.

The length of the forewings is 50–58 mm. There are two maize-yellow bands on the forewings: a central band of nine spots from the apex to the basal third at the inner margin and a sub-marginal band of three to seven spots. There are several smaller maize-yellow spots near the costa at the end of the discal cell. There is a background-colored dark oval spot of variable size inside or at the anterior edge of the yellow central band spot, sometimes dividing the yellow spot into two. The marginal pale spots at the dips between the veins are small or almost absent. The hindwings have two maize-yellow bands extending from the forewings. There is a maroon-red to orange-red eyespot near the tornus with a blue crescent above. The center of the tail tip is yellow.

Eggs are laid singly on young leaves and shoots of Zanthoxylum fagara, Ptelea trifoliata, Amyris texana and Casimiroa greggii, Ruta graveolens and Citrus species. The colour of the egg is pale yellow when laid, gradually changing to dull orange-brown. First instar larvae are 3–5 mm in length with a yellow-brown head capsule. The body pattern resembles bird-droppings. The second instar is 5–11 mm with a uniformly brownish head. Third instars are 11–16 mm, fourth 16–30 mm and fifth instar 30–50 mm. When a late instar larva is startled, it lifts its head and inflates the thorax, revealing the eyespots on the meta-thorax. If disturbed further, it everts red osmeterium from behind the head. Early instar larva tends to use osmeterium right away when disturbed, and osmeterium of the first instar is yellowish.

Pupation takes place in a pupa of 26–36 mm in length. It is mottled pale to greyish and dark brown, resembling the surface of a tree or branch it is attached to. The darkness of a pupa is frequently determined by the color of the surface it rests on.

== Taxonomy ==
The species was known for over a century as Papilio cresphontes and only recognized as a different species in 2014, primarily based on DNA evidence; it is named in honour of the wife of the first author of the study that described it.

Papilio rumiko is a member of the Papilio thoas species group.

== Gallery ==
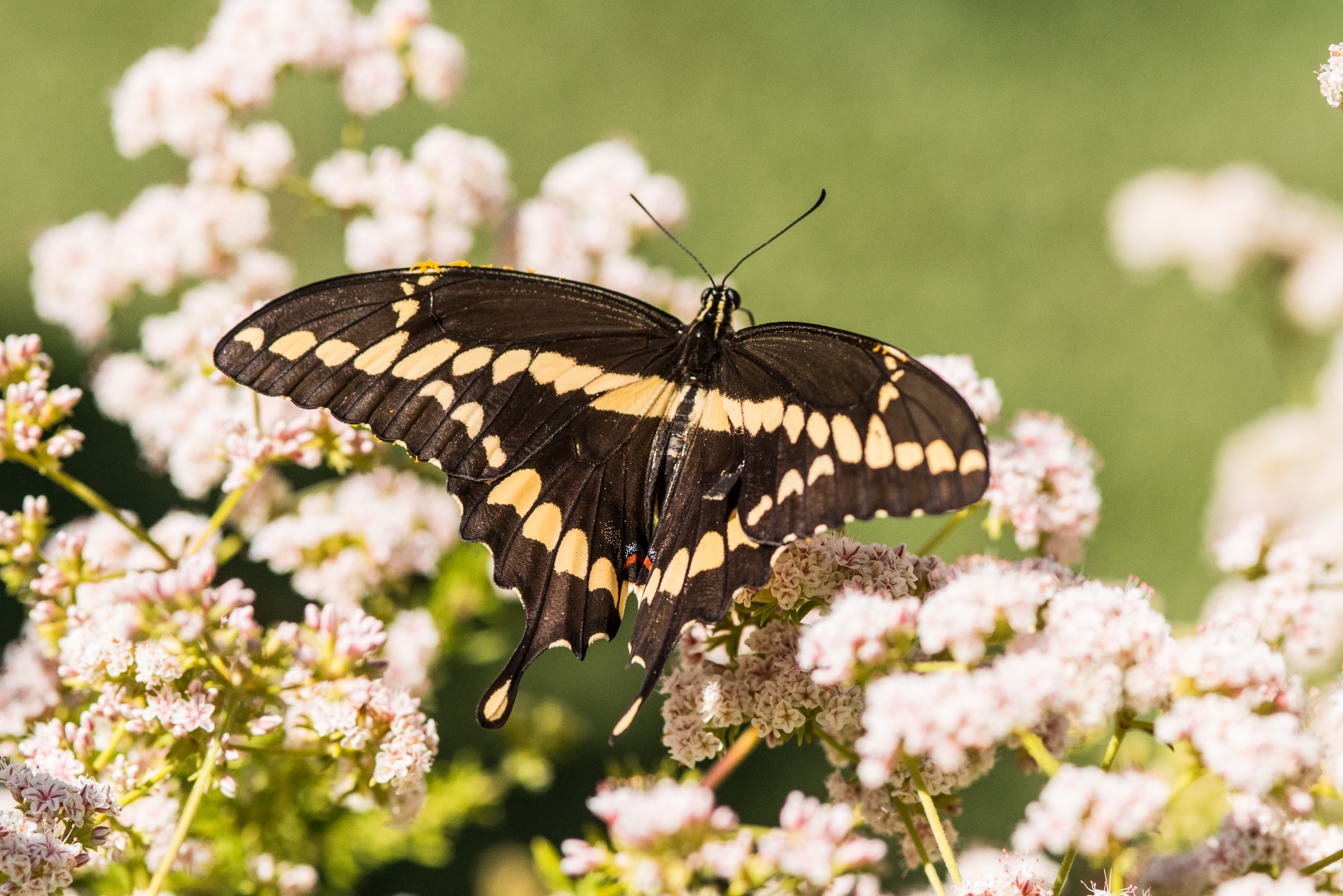
adult on California buckwheat (Eriogonum fasciculatum)

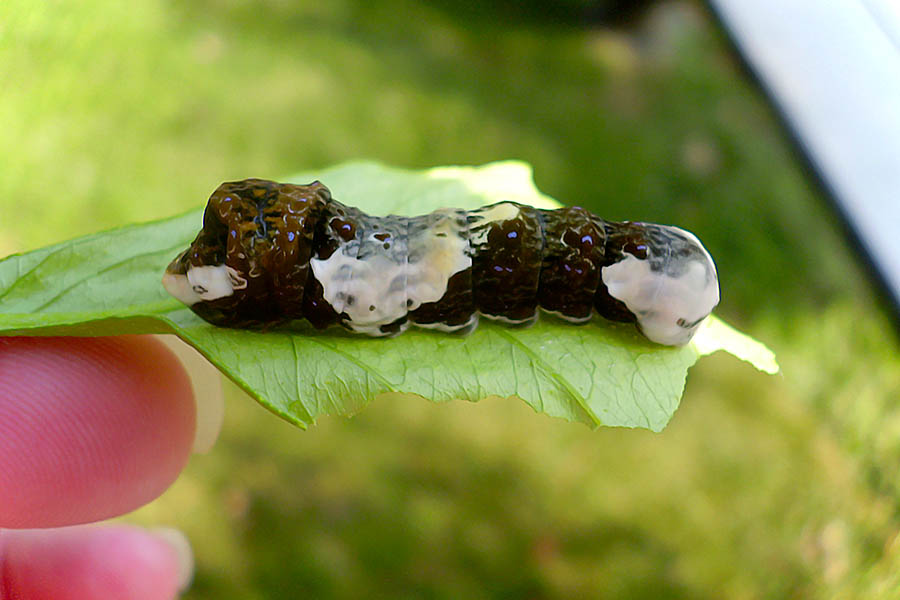
P. rumiko caterpillar on lemon leaf

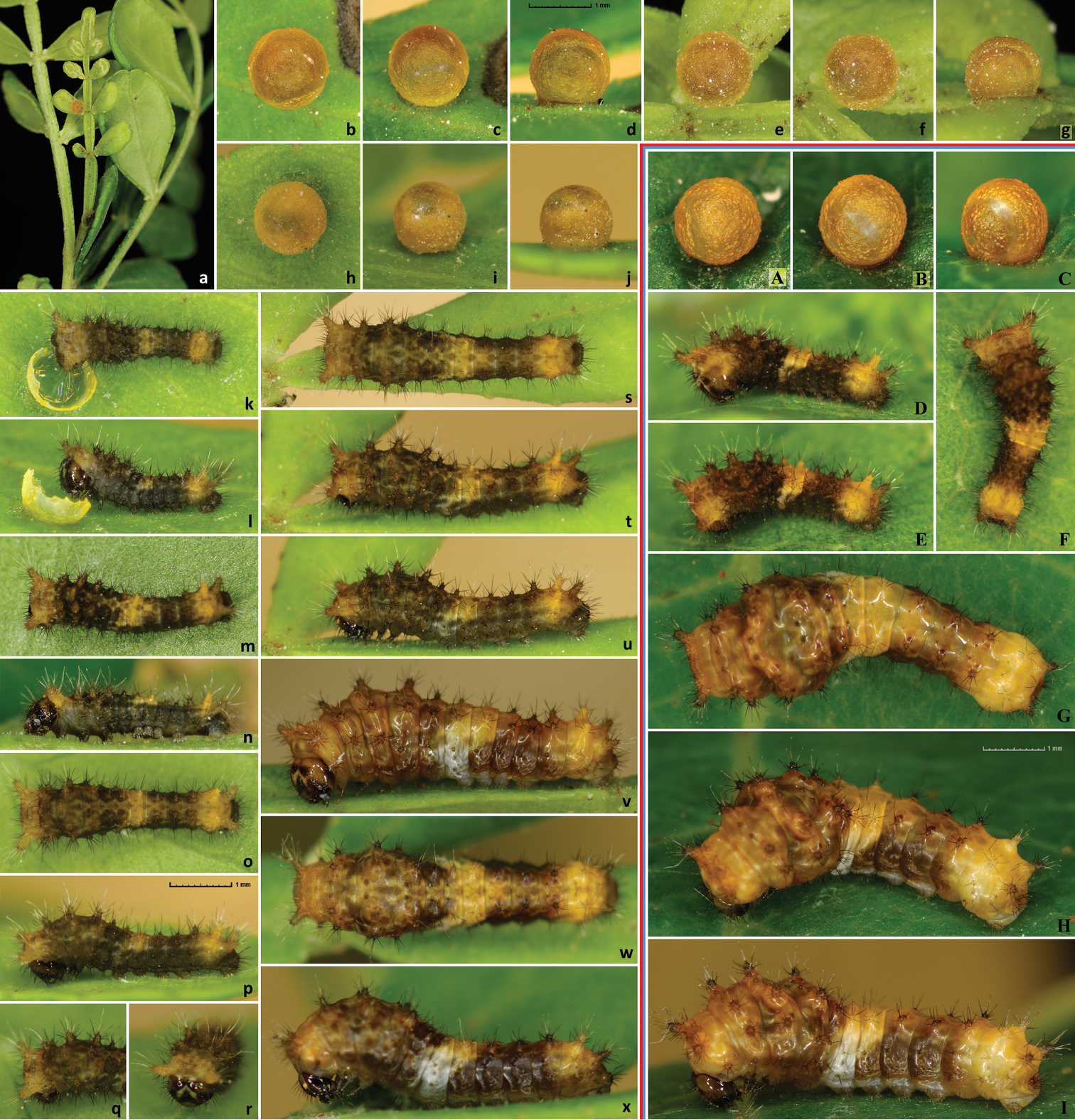
Papilio rumiko vs Papilio cresphontes eggs and 1st instar

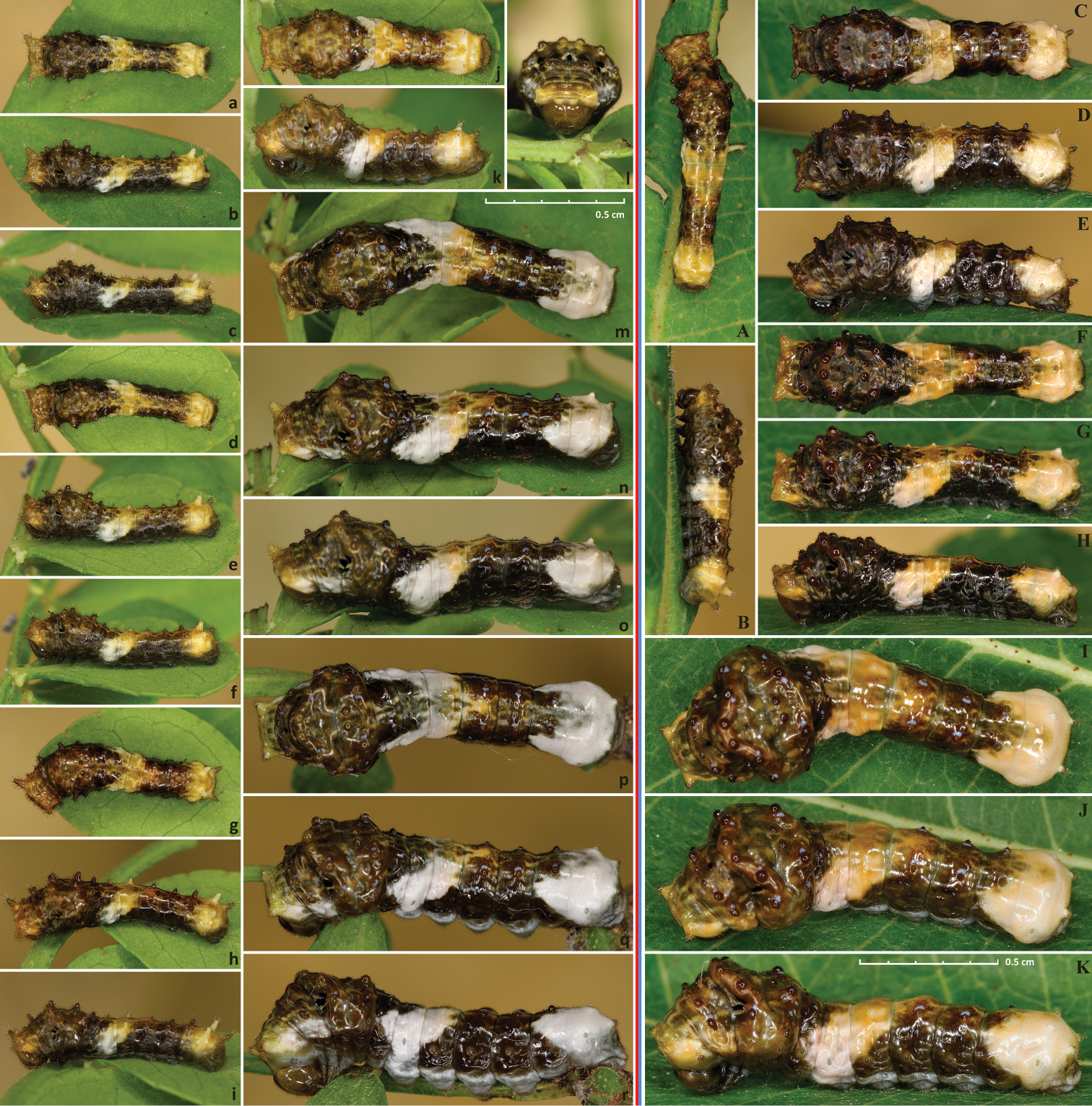
Papilio rumiko vs Papilio cresphontes 2nd and 3rd instar

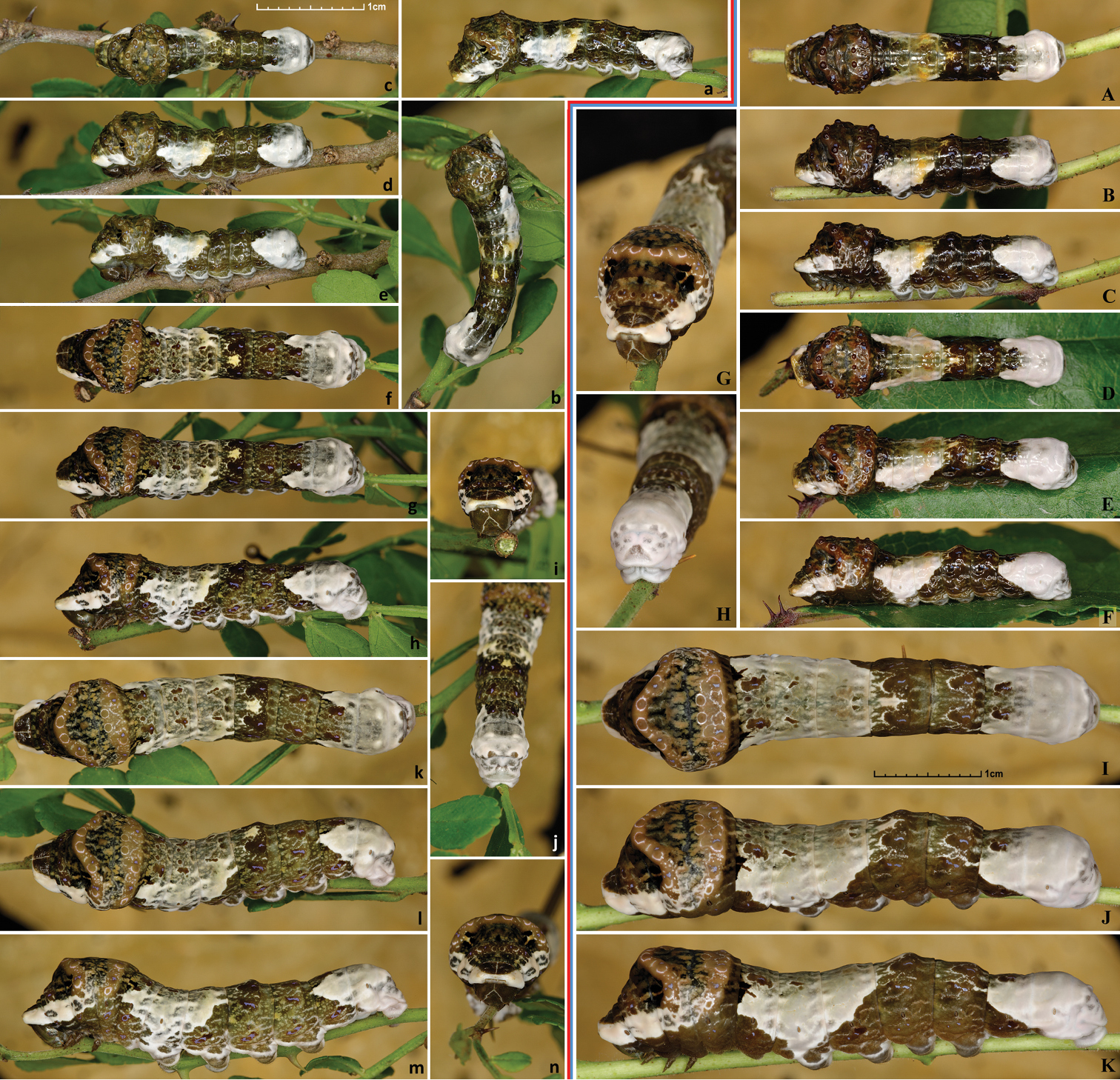
Papilio rumiko vs Papilio cresphontes 4th and 5th instar

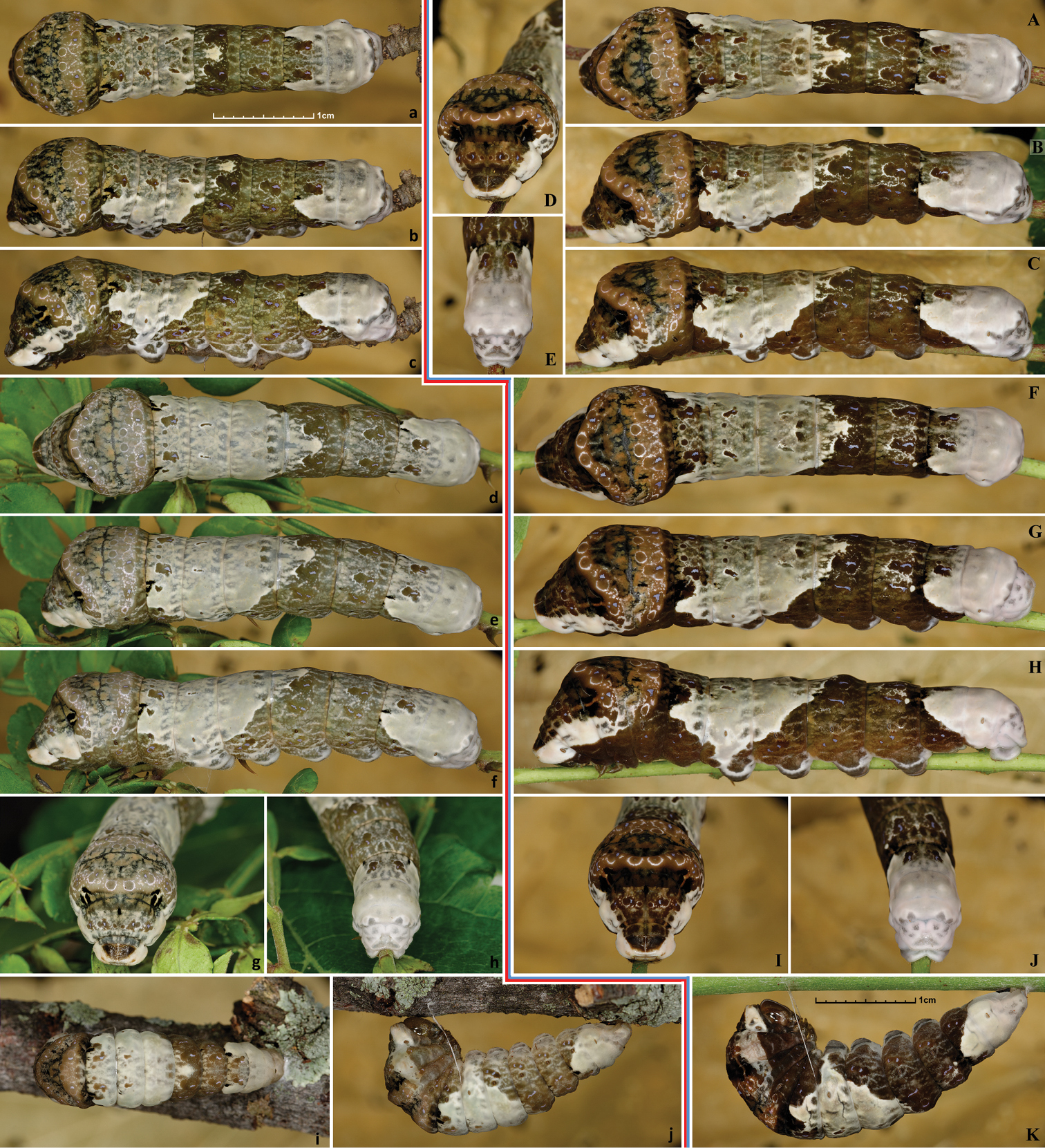
Papilio rumiko vs Papilio cresphontes 5th instar and prepupae

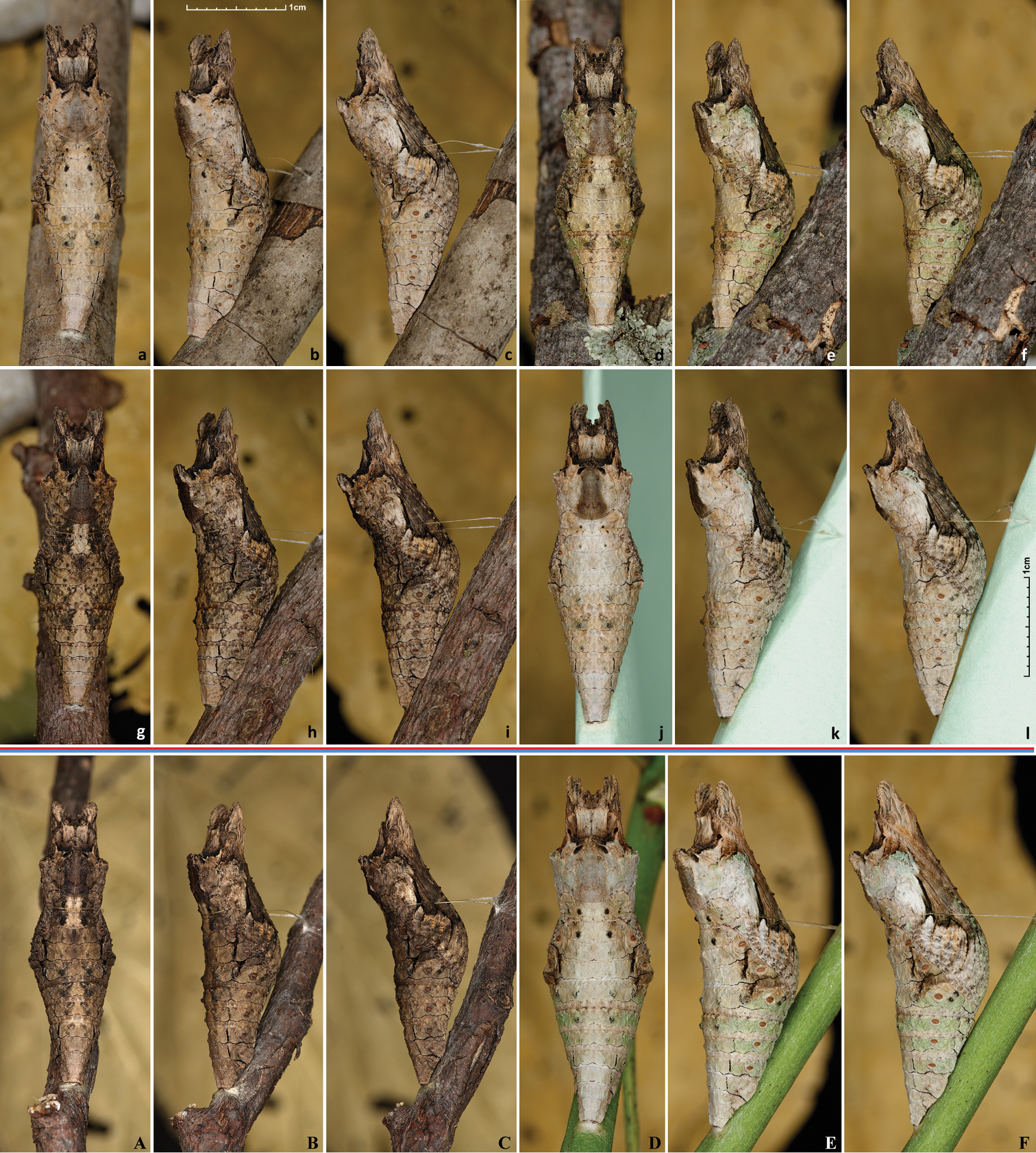
Papilio rumiko vs Papilio cresphontes pupae

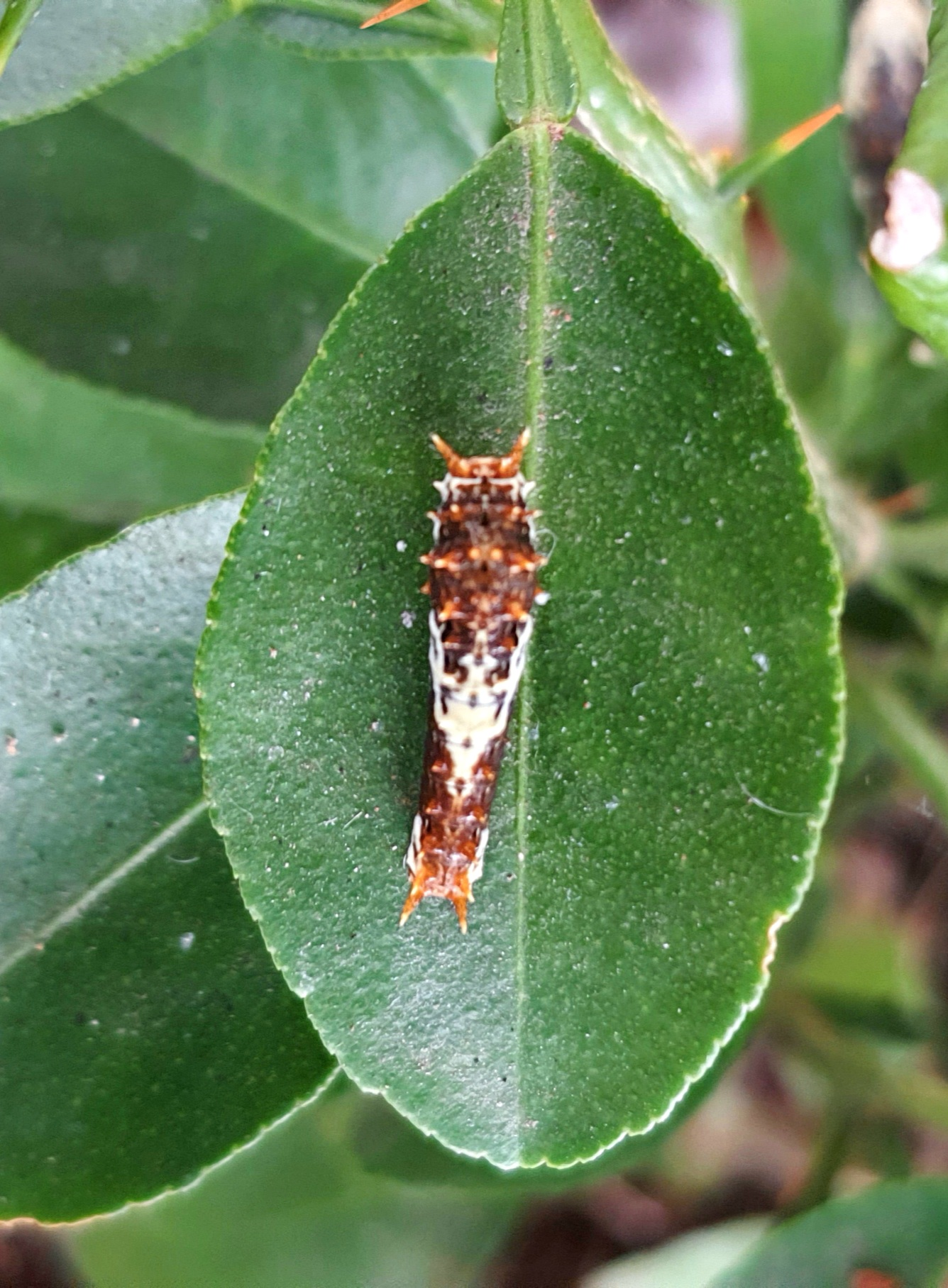
Papilio rumiko larva on a lemon leaf
