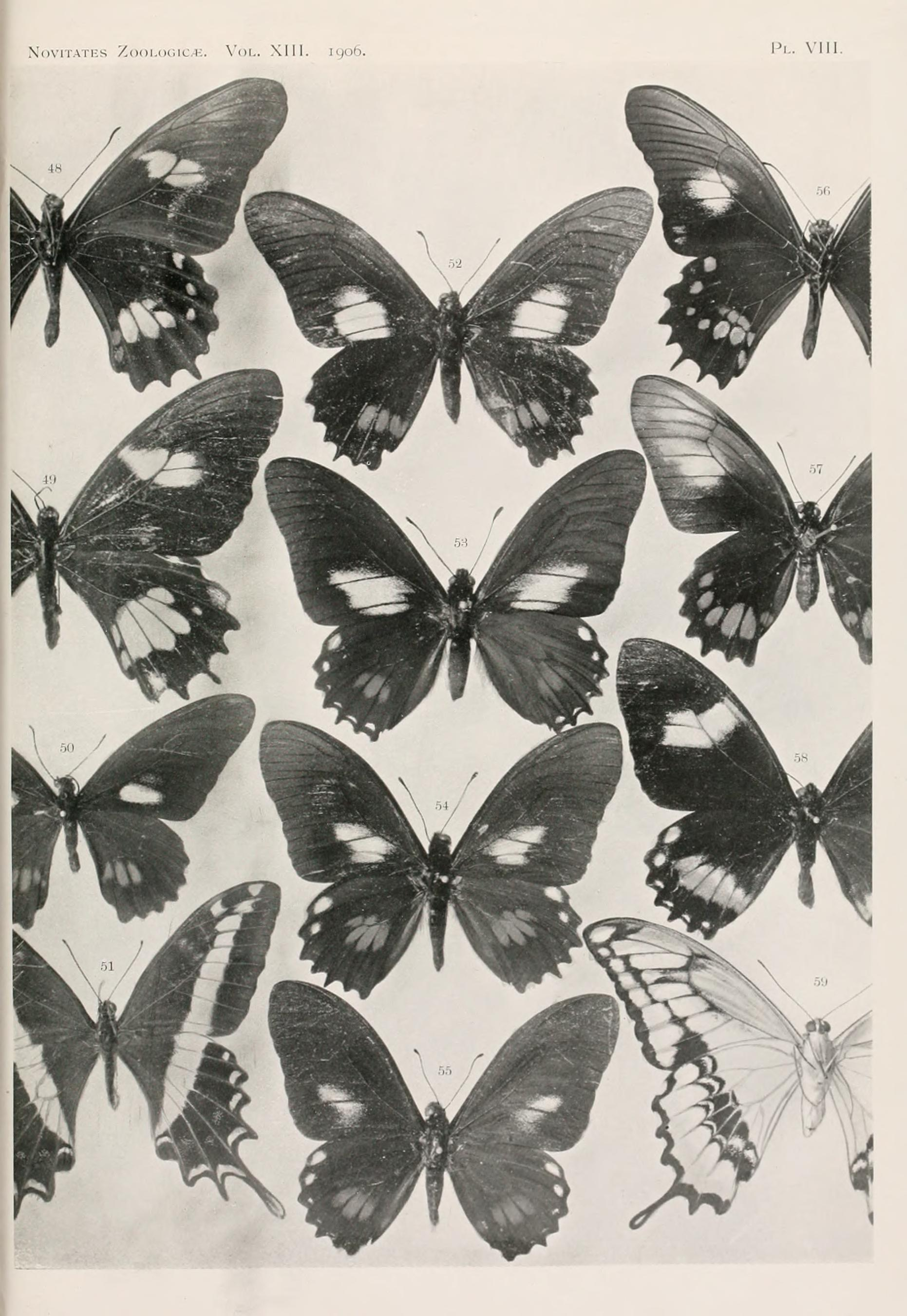
- Plate accompanying original description Papilio melonius is figure 59

Scientific classification
- Kingdom: Animalia
- Phylum: Arthropoda
- Clade: Pancrustacea
- Class: Insecta
- Order: Lepidoptera
- Family: Papilionidae
- Genus: Papilio
- Species: P. melonius

Binomial name
- Papilio melonius Rothschild & Jordan, 1906

Synonyms
- Papilio thoas melonius Rothschild & Jordan, 1906

= Papilio melonius =

Species of butterfly

Papilio melonius is a species of swallowtail butterfly from the genus Papilio that is found in Jamaica.

== Original description ==
P. thoas melonius subsp. nov. (PI. VIII. fig. 59). Males. A remarkably distinct form, usually of small size, resembling small specimens of P.cresphontes Yellow markings of upperside pale; forewing :discal patch R2— R3 as in P. cresphontes much longer than the following patch; patch M1 — M2- acuminate distally; no spot in cell; three submarginal spots, occasionally preceded by one or two small dots; patch SC5 — R1 entire or nearly, but sometimes deeply sinuate. Hindwing : yellow marginal abdominal spot large, continuous with the orange-red halfmoon, at the proximal side of which there is a blue crescent; spot on tail small in male. Underside, forewing : submarginal spots R3 — M2 much larger than the others, spot M1 — M2 being the largest, spot R2— R3 about the same size as spot M2 — SM2 or smaller. Hindwing : three large orange patches R2 — M1, sharply defined, the third being the longest, being more than half the length of the pale yellow submarginal patch R3 — M1 ; a complete series of pale blue spots, all the same pure colour; occasionally some orange scaling in apex of cell and behind SC2- ; orange anal halfring larger than in the other forms of P. thoas.

Genitalia : Male. Tenth tergite long, much slenderer than in the other subspecies, strongly spatulate, longitudinally grooved beneath, not carinate; long pointed process of sternite straight, the hairy tooth at base of this process small; harpe quite different from that of all other subspecies, being short, subtruncate, with the apex denticulate.Female Anterior edge of vaginal orifice not tubercnliform, on each side of the orifice a ridge, and behind the orifice two double ridges. Hab. Jamaica.

In the Tring Museum 6 males 3 females

Also in coll. Grose-Smith and coll. Adams.

== Taxonomy ==
Papilio melonius is a member of the Papilio thoas species group.
