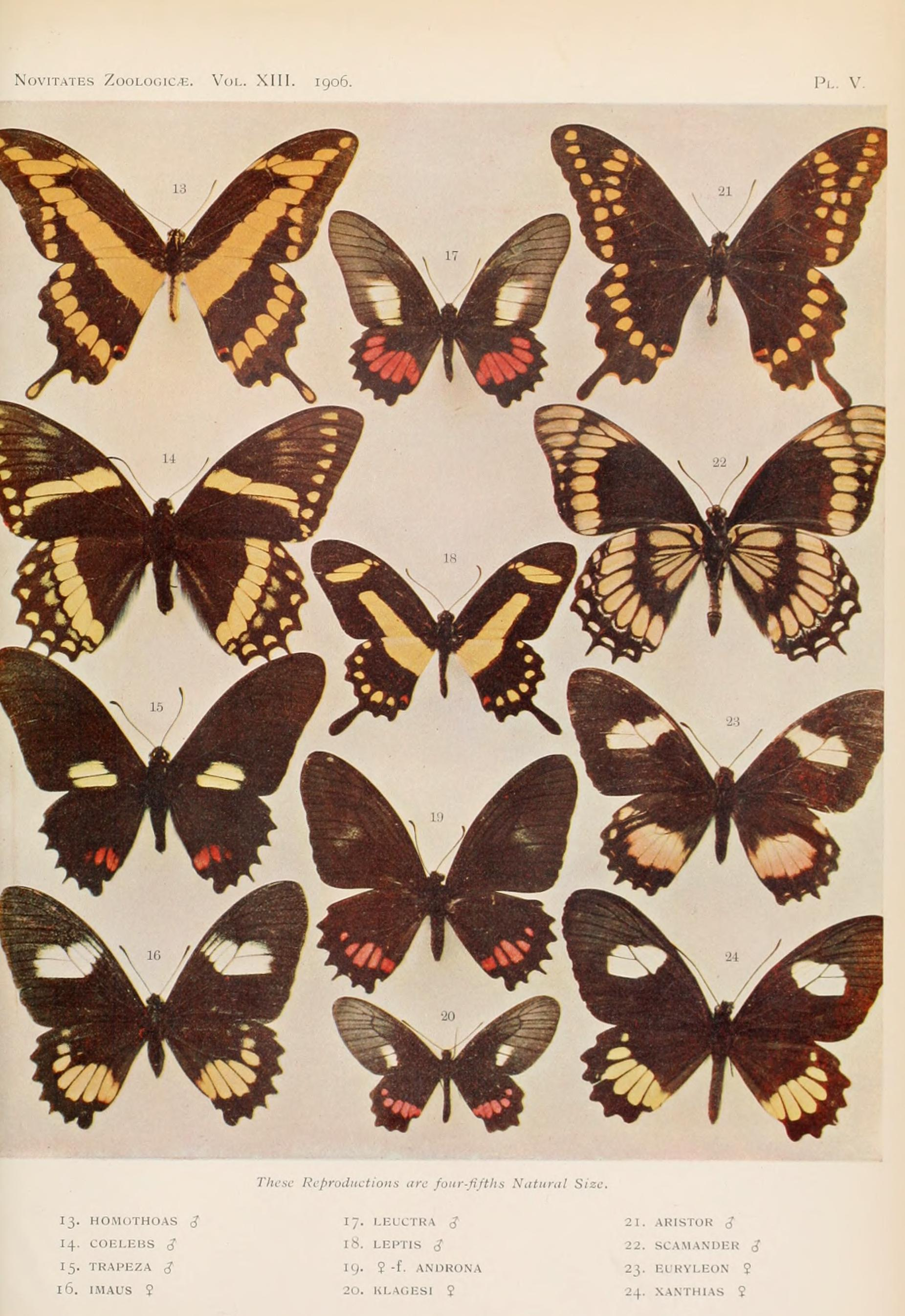
- Plate accompanying original description (figure 13)

Scientific classification
- Kingdom: Animalia
- Phylum: Arthropoda
- Clade: Pancrustacea
- Class: Insecta
- Order: Lepidoptera
- Family: Papilionidae
- Genus: Papilio
- Species: P. homothoas

Binomial name
- Papilio homothoas Rothschild & Karl Jordan, 1906

= Papilio homothoas =

Species of butterfly

Papilio homothoas, the false giant swallowtail, is a species of swallowtail butterfly from the genus Papilio that is found in Colombia, Venezuela, Trinidad, Panama, and Costa Rica.

== Description ==
P. homothoas R. & J. (7c). Tail shorter and more rounded at the tip than in the thoas-forms from South America; no cell-spot on the forewing. Genitalia quite different from the organs of P. thoas; instead left of the long anal clasper of thoas there is a short fork, the teeth of which are curved right and harpe broad, rounded. Orinoco, Colombia, Marguerita Island off the coast of Venezuela.

== Biology ==
The larvae of P. homothoas feed on plants of the genera Ruta and Citrus (Rutaceae).

== Taxonomy ==
Papilio machaonides is a member of the Papilio thoas species group.
