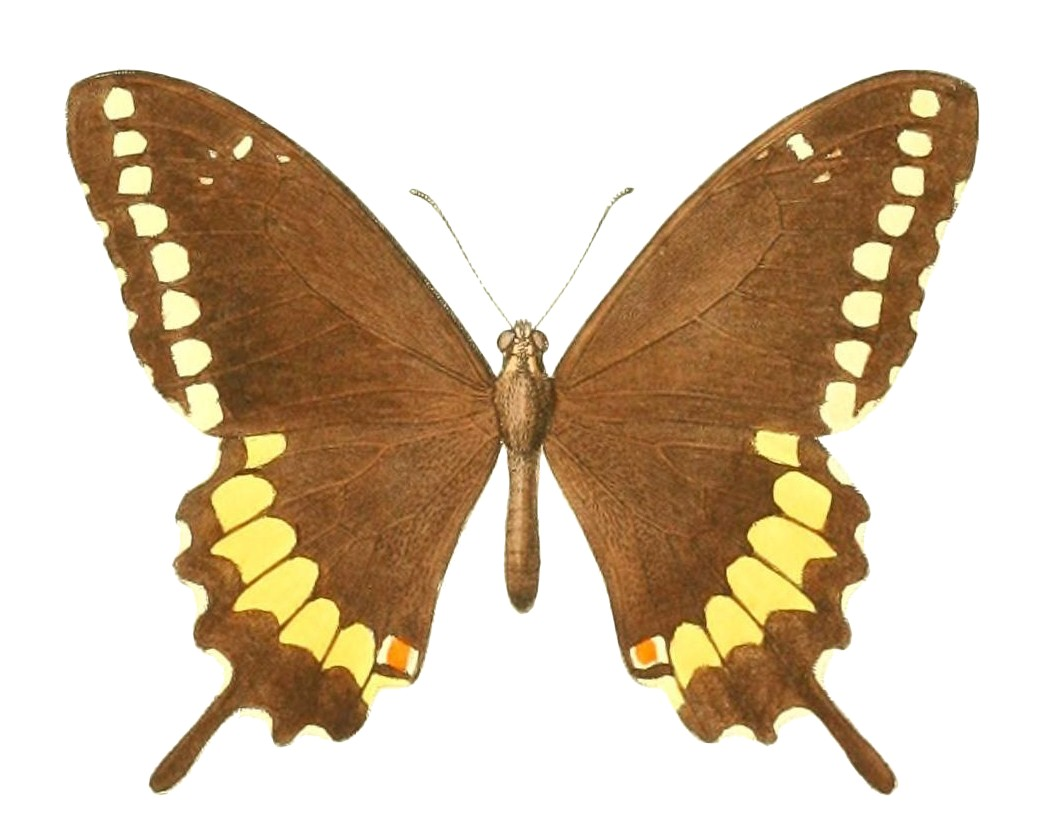

Conservation status
- Least Concern (IUCN 3.1)

Scientific classification
- Kingdom: Animalia
- Phylum: Arthropoda
- Clade: Pancrustacea
- Class: Insecta
- Order: Lepidoptera
- Family: Papilionidae
- Genus: Papilio
- Species: P. caiguanabus

Binomial name
- Papilio caiguanabus (Poey, 1851)

= Papilio caiguanabus =

Poey's black swallowtail

Species of butterfly

Papilio caiguanabus, the Poey's black swallowtail, is a species of Neotropical butterfly in the family Papilionidae. It is endemic to Cuba.

== Description ==
On the obverse, the wings are dark brown. The forewings have a series of submarginal yellow dots and a few yellow macules at the apex. The hindwings have tails and bear a postdiscal row of macules, yellow in the male and white in the female, and a red dot in the anal angle. The reverse side is very similar but the hindwings bear two additional red dots and blue disc lunules.

P. caiguanabus has a peculiar appearance owing to the absence of the yellow discal bands and the enlargement of the submarginal spots.

== Taxonomy ==
Papilio caiguanabus is a member of the Papilio thoas species group
