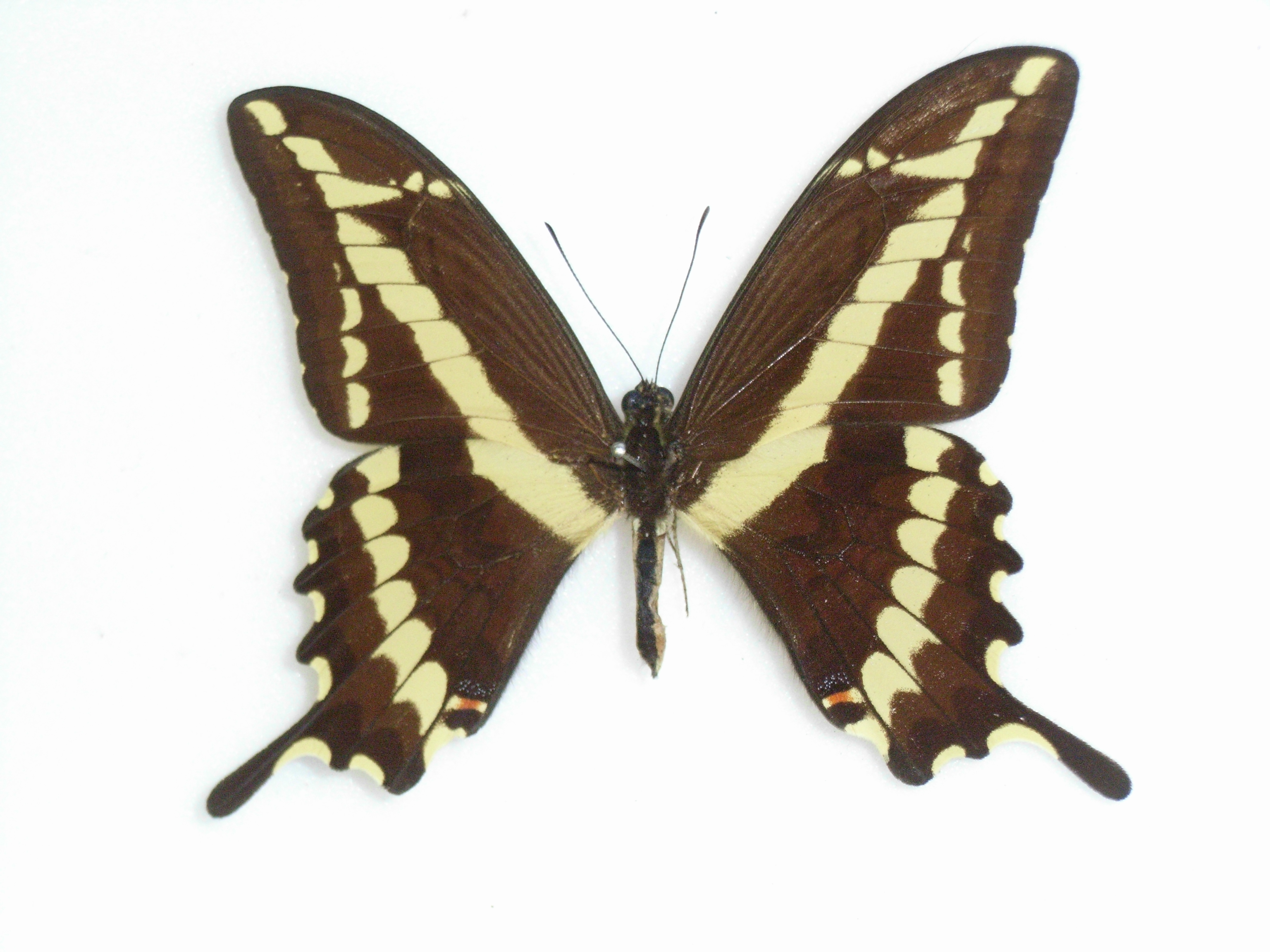
- Papilio paeon Male

Scientific classification
- Kingdom: Animalia
- Phylum: Arthropoda
- Clade: Pancrustacea
- Class: Insecta
- Order: Lepidoptera
- Family: Papilionidae
- Genus: Papilio
- Species: P. paeon

Binomial name
- Papilio paeon Boisduval, 1836

Synonyms
- Heraclides paeon marxi Möhn, 2001; Papilio thrason C. & R. Felder, 1865

= Papilio paeon =

Species of butterfly

Papilio paeon is a species of swallowtail butterfly from the genus Papilio that is found in Ecuador, Peru, Bolivia, Costa Rica, Venezuela and Colombia.

== Description ==
The imago is between 10 and 11 cm wide 1 . On the obverse the wings are black. The forewings bear a creamy white transverse band, a series of submarginal macules of the same color and a few additional macules above the cell. The cell has thin, slightly lighter stripes. The hindwings bear a cream band in the extension of that of the forewings and a series of submarginal macules of the same color. They are extended by tails and have an orange dot surmounted by a blue lunule in the anal angle.

On the reverse, the wings are predominantly creamy white. The forewings bear similar designs to the obverse, but the black parts seem partly obliterated. The hind wings are creamy white edged with black and bear a median series of blue lunules and an orange spot.

== Biology ==
A bioindicator of integrity in semi-arid vegetation and habitats.

== Subspecies ==
- Papilio paeon paeon (Ecuador, Peru, Bolivia)
- Papilio paeon thrason C. & R. Felder, 1865 (Costa Rica, Venezuela, Colombia)
- Papilio paeon escomeli Cockerell, 1927 (Peru)

== Taxonomy ==
Papilio paeon is a member of the Papilio thoas species group
