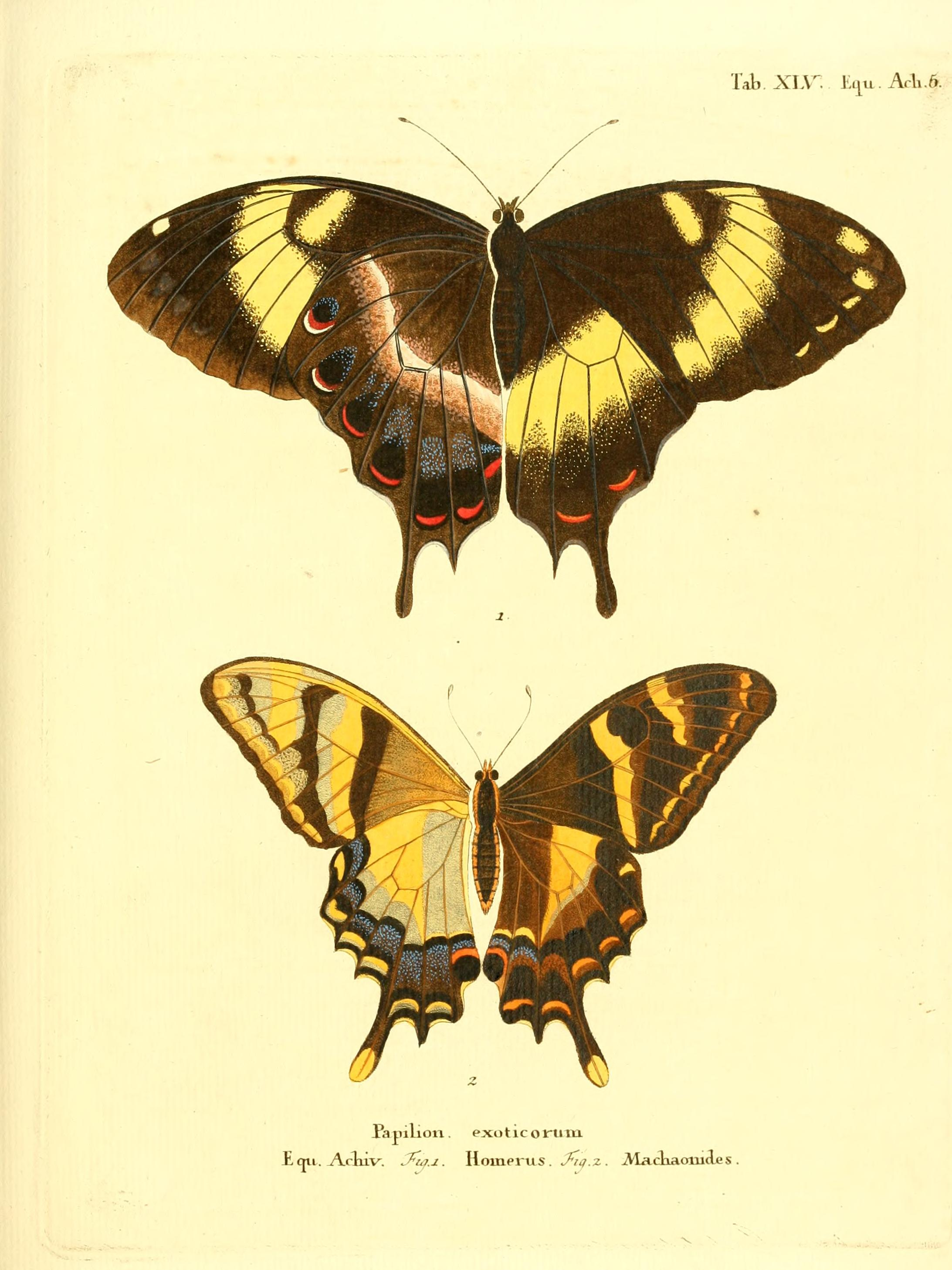
- Esper's 1796 plate in Die ausländischen Schmetterlinge in Abbildungen nach der Natur

Conservation status
- Least Concern (IUCN 3.1)

Scientific classification
- Kingdom: Animalia
- Phylum: Arthropoda
- Clade: Pancrustacea
- Class: Insecta
- Order: Lepidoptera
- Family: Papilionidae
- Genus: Papilio
- Species: P. machaonides

Binomial name
- Papilio machaonides Esper, 1796

Synonyms
- Papilio lycoraeus Godart, 1819; Heraclides machaonides Esper, 1796

= Papilio machaonides =

Species of butterfly

Papilio machaonides, the machaonides swallowtail, is a species of Neotropical swallowtail butterfly from the genus Papilio that is found in Hispaniola and is also thought to inhabit the Cayman Islands.

== Description ==
Papilio machaonides has been described as having 'slow and floppy' flight. The discal band of the forewing is interrupted, with the posterior part contiguous with the cellspot, forming an oblique band.

The wingspan is between 9 and 11 cm. On the obverse, the wings are black. The forewings bear a rather thin yellow transverse band and a yellow macule in the apical region, as well as a series of submarginal yellow macules. The hindwings are extended by spatula-shaped tails, yellow at the tip, and bear a second, shorter, slender tail. The hindwings are adorned with a large yellow macule with a diffuse margin, submarginal yellow macules and bear an orange ocelli surmounted by a blue lunula in the anal angle, as well as two other blue lunulae in the submarginal part.

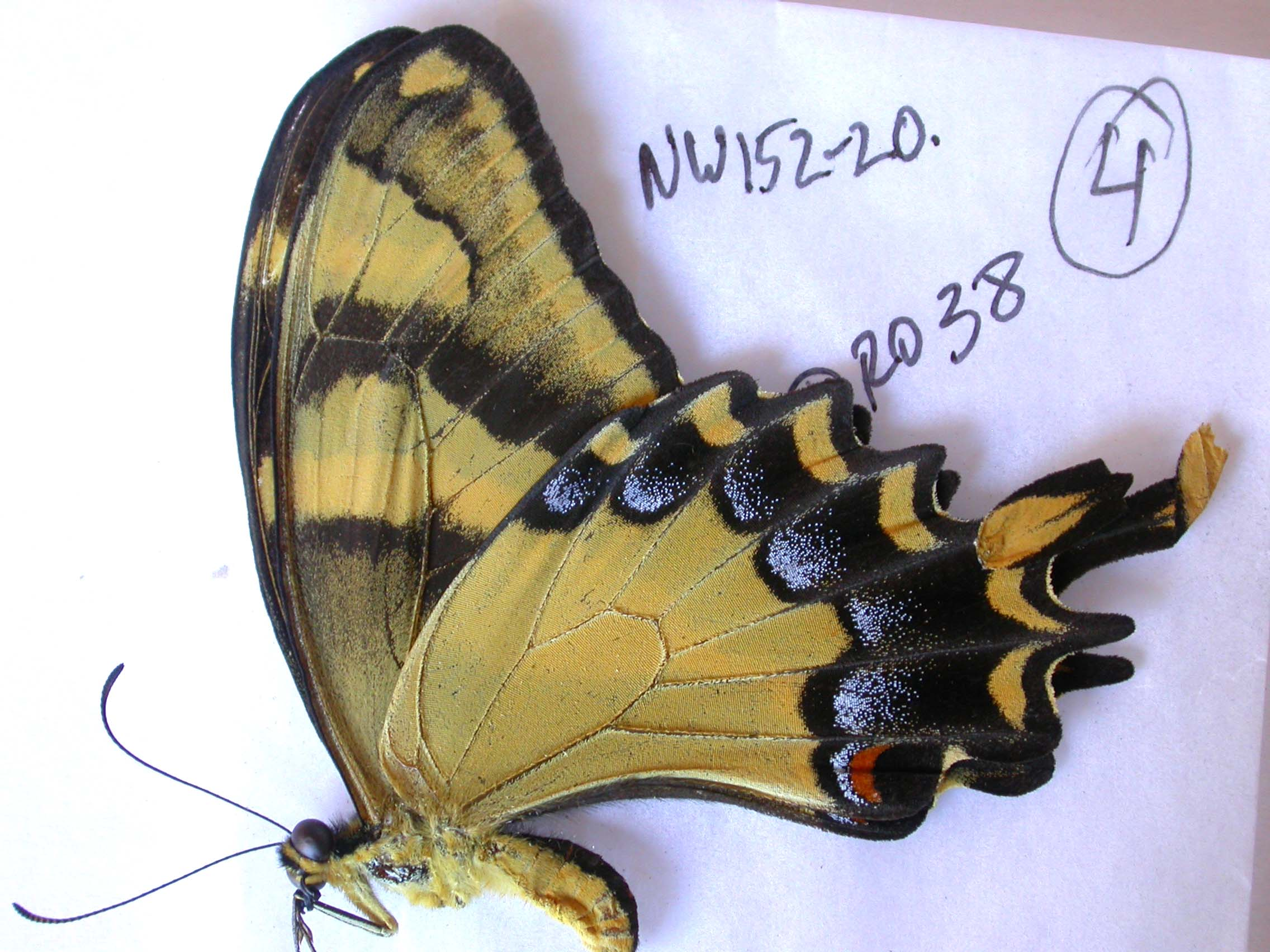

On the reverse side, the wings are predominantly yellow, the forewings bear diffuse brown markings while the hindwings bear a black submarginal band partly covered with iridescent blue scales. The same ocelli is found in the anal angle as on the obverse.

The underside and sides of the body are yellow and the top of the body is black.

== Status ==
It is a very common butterfly throughout Hispaniola, occurring from sea-level to high elevation. It is most commonly seen in July and August.

== Taxonomy ==
Papilio machaonides is a member of the Papilio thoas species group.

== Philately ==
The butterfly appeared on a Haitian 1969 0.25 gourde stamp. It was in the Michel catalog 1094.
