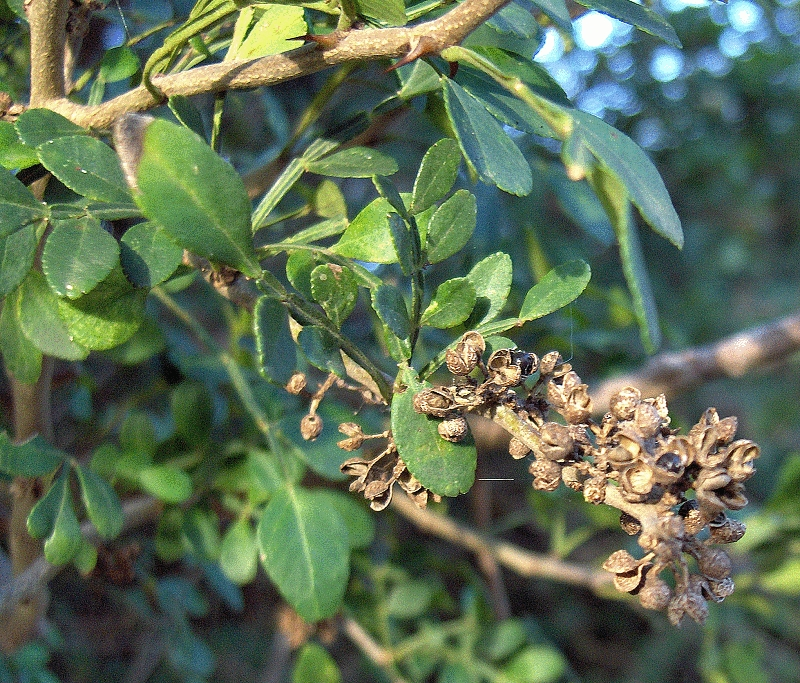

Conservation status
- Least Concern (IUCN 3.1)

Scientific classification
- Kingdom: Plantae
- Clade: Tracheophytes
- Clade: Angiosperms
- Clade: Eudicots
- Clade: Rosids
- Order: Sapindales
- Family: Rutaceae
- Genus: Zanthoxylum
- Species: Z. fagara

Binomial name
- Zanthoxylum fagara (L.) Sarg., 1890

Synonyms
- Schinus fagara L.

= Zanthoxylum fagara =

Species of tree

Zanthoxylum fagara or wild lime, is a species of flowering plant that—despite its name—is not part of the genus Citrus with real limes and other fruit, but is a close cousin in the larger citrus family, Rutaceae. It is more closely related to Sichuan pepper. It is native to southern Florida and Texas in the United States, and to Mexico, Central America, the Caribbean, and South America as far south as Paraguay. Common names include: lime prickly-ash, wild lime, colima, uña de gato, and corriosa.

== Description ==
Zanthoxylum fagara is a spreading shrub or small tree growing to 7 m (23 ft) tall. Its trunk is generally rough with gray bark and grows to about 0.25 m (0.82 ft) in diameter. The irregularly-shaped branches contain hooked spines with pinnate 5 cm (2.0 in) leaves. The leaves and bark can be crushed to make a bitter-tasting condiment, and much of the tree smells similar to citrus. Lime prickly-ash has a high drought tolerance and grows best in full sun, but it can also survive as an understory shrub. It provides significant food and cover for native wildlife and the leaves host the larvae of many butterflies, such as the giant swallowtail (Papilio cresphontes).

== Uses ==
The powdered bark and leaves have been used as a spice, with an odor similar to that of limes.
