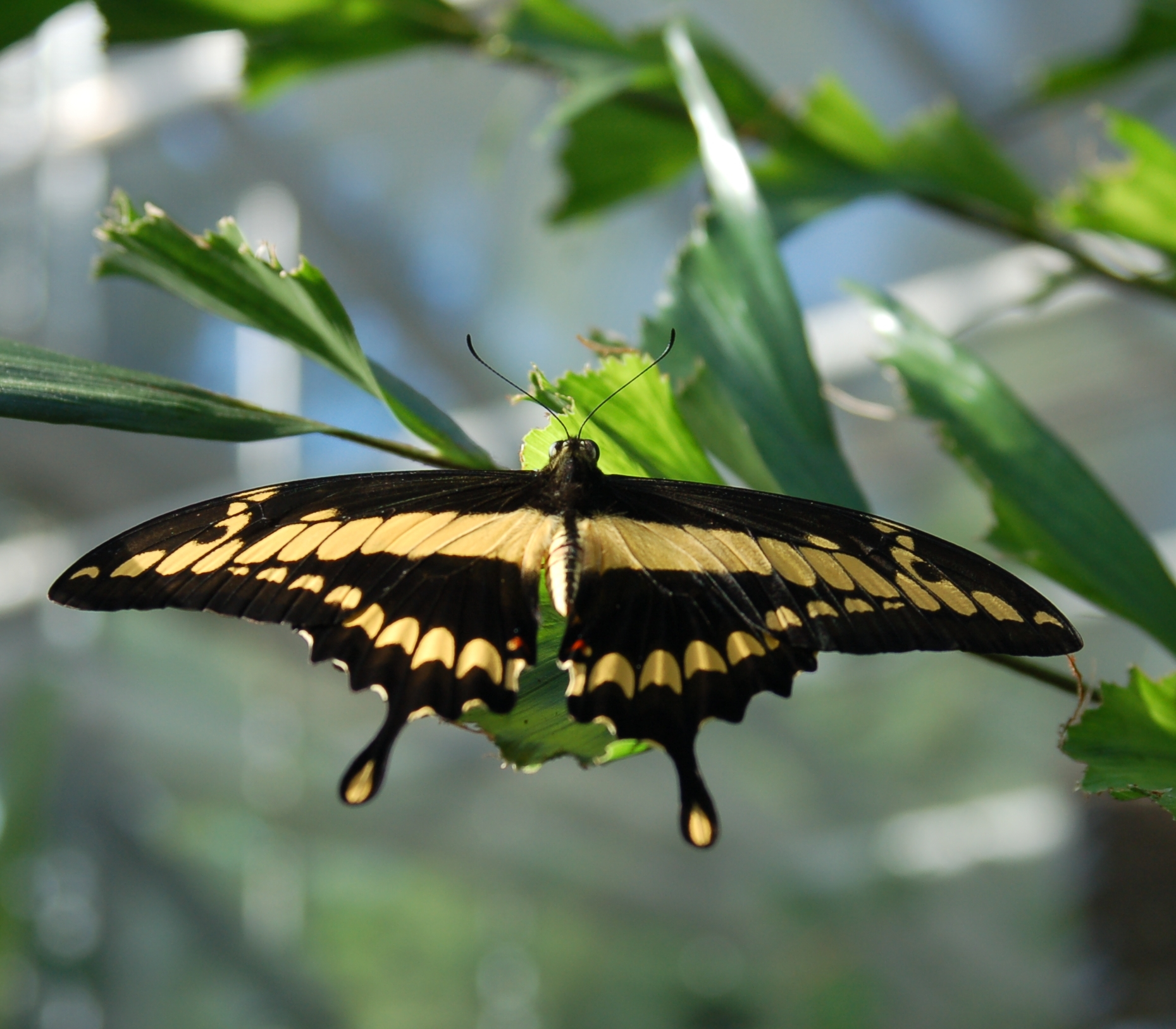

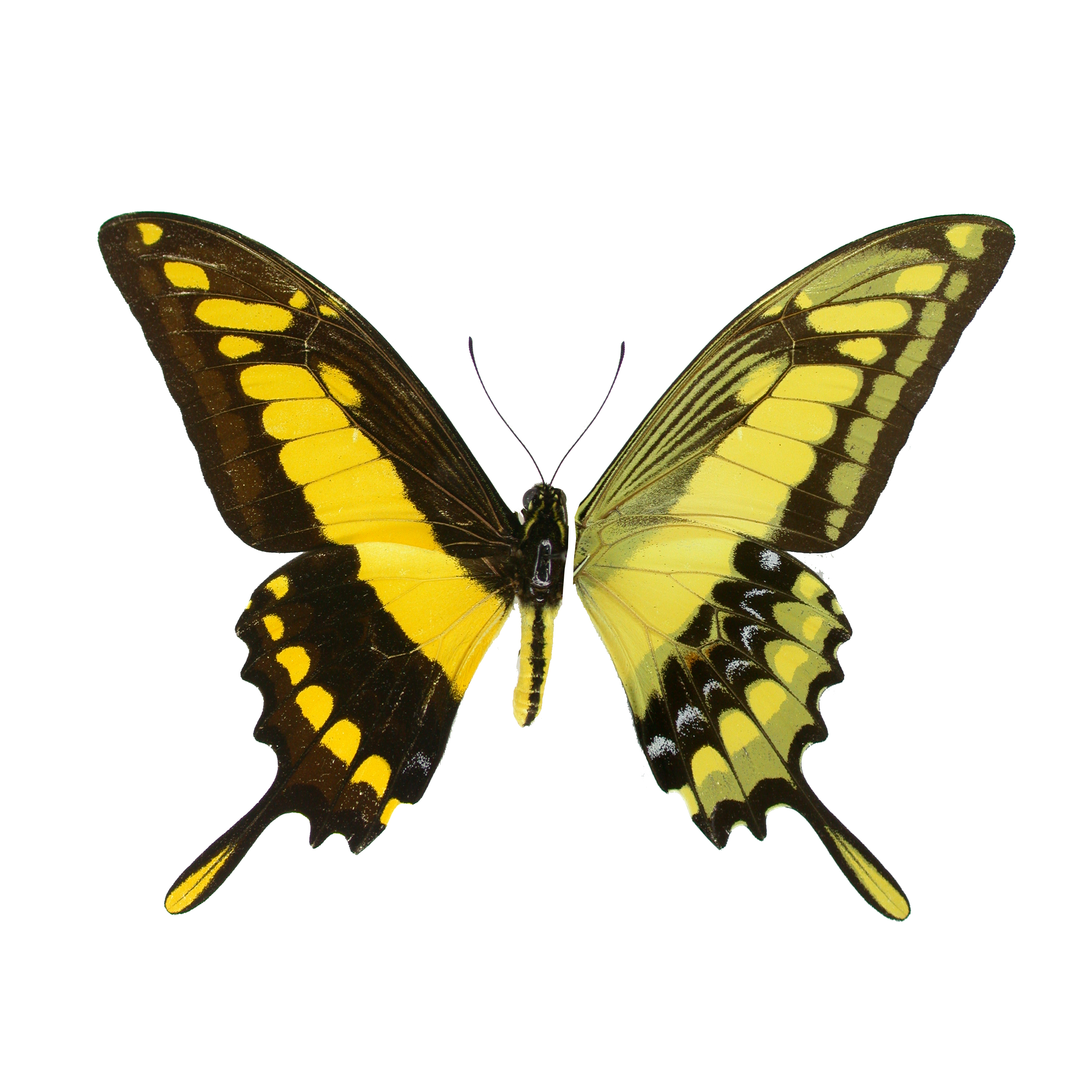

Scientific classification
- Kingdom: Animalia
- Phylum: Arthropoda
- Class: Insecta
- Order: Lepidoptera
- Family: Papilionidae
- Genus: Papilio
- Species: P. thoas

Binomial name
- Papilio thoas Linnaeus, 1771

Synonyms
- Heraclides thoas

= Papilio thoas =

King swallowtail

Species of butterfly

Papilio thoas, the king swallowtail or Thoas swallowtail, is a butterfly of the family Papilionidae. It is found in the southernmost United States, Mexico, Central America and South America (as far south as Argentina and Uruguay). The species is easily confused with the giant swallowtail, which it closely resembles in both larval and adult stages. The caterpillars feed on the leaves of citrus plants (Rutaceae). They have also been reported as feeding on a member of the genus Piper.

== Description ==
A large species (12 to 14 cm (4.7 to 5.5 in) wingspan. The wings are narrow. The forewings are mostly brown. A yellow band runs from the tip, becoming narrower towards the back. There is also a row of yellow arcuate spots on the underside of the wing edge. The hind wings are predominantly brown, toothed and have a long caudal process. This carries a yellow core. There is a row of yellow arcuate spots at the edge of the hind wings. A broad yellow band runs through the first half of the wing. Inside sits a black eyespot with blue-white dusting. The yellow regions are more pronounced on the undersides of the wings. Blue-white arcuate spots adjoin the yellow arcuate spots on the upper side. The eyespot is only weakly pronounced. The body of the king swallowtail is yellow.- Seitz "- P. thoas. The spatulate tail has a yellow spot in the middle. The species occurs from Texas and the West Indian Islands southwards to Buenos Aires, but is wanting on the Lesser Antilles. It. is everywhere common and flies in the open country, in gardens and plantations. thoas is a very bold flier, which often mounts high in the air.. The larva lives on Piperaceae and Citrus. — melonius R. & J. is the subspecies from Jamaica: it has no cell-spot on the upper surface of the forewing. The reddish yellow spots on the under surface of the hindwing are very large. — oviedo Gundl. (= epithoas Oberth.) occurs on Cuba. The upper surface of the forewing, and especially the under surface, are more extended yellow and have also a deeper tint than in the other subspecies. — autocles R. & J., occurring from Texas to Nicaragua, has no cell-spot; the yellow areas are pale. — nealces R. & J. is distributed from Nicaragua to North-West Ecuador and eastward, to Trinidad and the Lower Orinoco. The forewing has always a cell-spot: the yellow tint is somewhat deeper than in autocles, but less deep than in the next subspecies; very common in Bogoti-collections. — thoas L. comes from the Guianas and the Lower Amazon. Deep yellow; forewing with cell-spot, the first spot near the apex of the wing usually small. — cinyras Men. is a large form, which inhabits the Middle and Lower Amazon and the eastern slopes of Ecuador, Peru and Bolivia; the submarginal spots of the forewing are almost always absent. — brasiliensis R: & J. , from Brazil, Paraguay and North Argentina, is often still larger than cinyras; the cell-spot of the forewing is absent or small, the first spot near the apex of the wing is mostly large and produced into a point. — thoantiades Burm. occurs in Argentina, especially in the province of Buenos Aires. It is a small form, usually with narrow, pale yellow band. Papilio cresphontes formerly considered a subspecies of thoas is very similar.

== Biology ==
Adult Thoas swallowtails fly year round in the tropics, feeding on nectar of a variety of flowers, including Lantana, Stachytarpheta, and Bougainvillea among other species.

== Subspecies ==
Listed alphabetically.

- P. t. autocles Rothschild & Jordan, 1906
- P. t. brasiliensis Rothschild & Jordan, 1906
- P. t. cynrias Ménétriés, 1857
- P. t. nealces Rothschild & Jordan, 1906
- P. t. oviedo Gundlach, 1866
- P. t. thoantiades Burmeister, 1878
- P. t. thoas Linnaeus, 1771

== Taxonomy ==
It is the nominal member of the species group thoas the members are: Papilio andraemon(Hübner, [1823]) Papilio androgeus Cramer, [1775] Papilio aristodemus Esper, 1794 Papilio aristor Godart, 1819 Papilio astyalus Godart, 1819 Papilio cresphontes Cramer, [1777] Papilio homothoas Rothschild & Jordan, 1906 Papilio machaonides Esper, 1796 Papilio melonius Rothschild & Jordan, 1906 Papilio ornythion Boisduval, 1836 Papilio rumiko (Shiraiwa & Grishin, 2014) Papilio thersites Fabricius, 1775 Papilio paeon Boisduval, 1836 Papilio caiguanabus (Poey, 1851) Papilio thoas Linnaeus, 1771

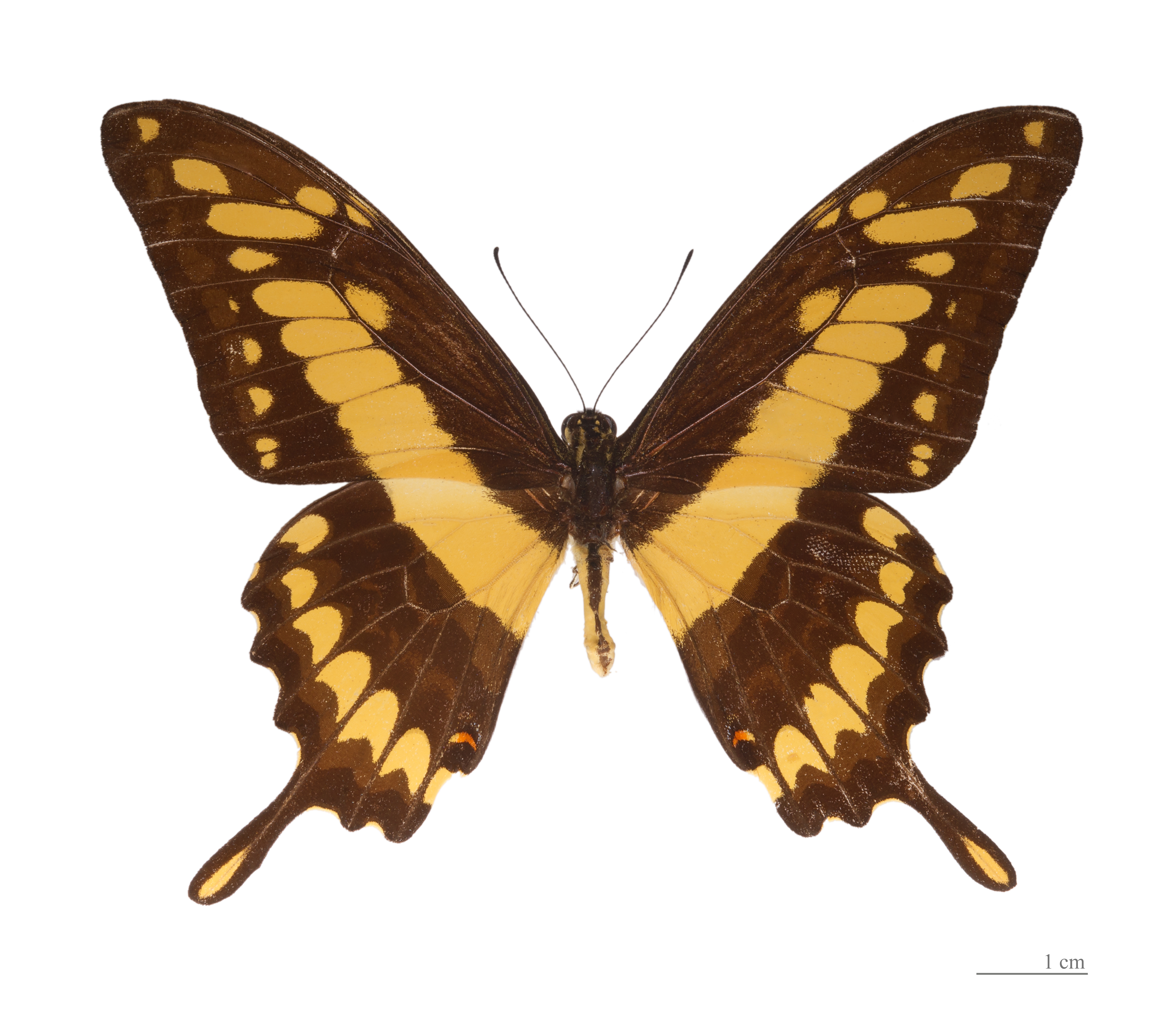
P. t. thoas

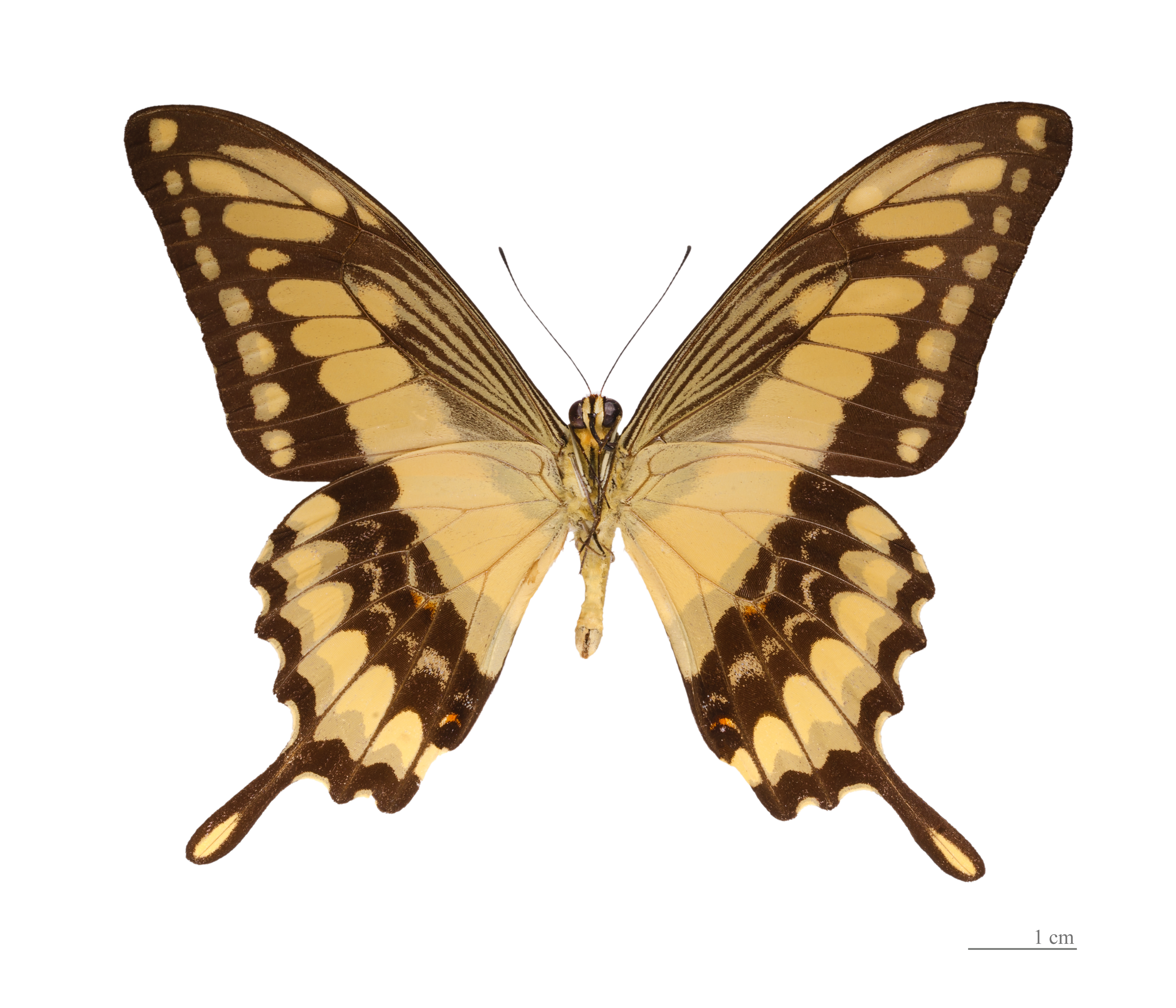
P. t. thoas, underside

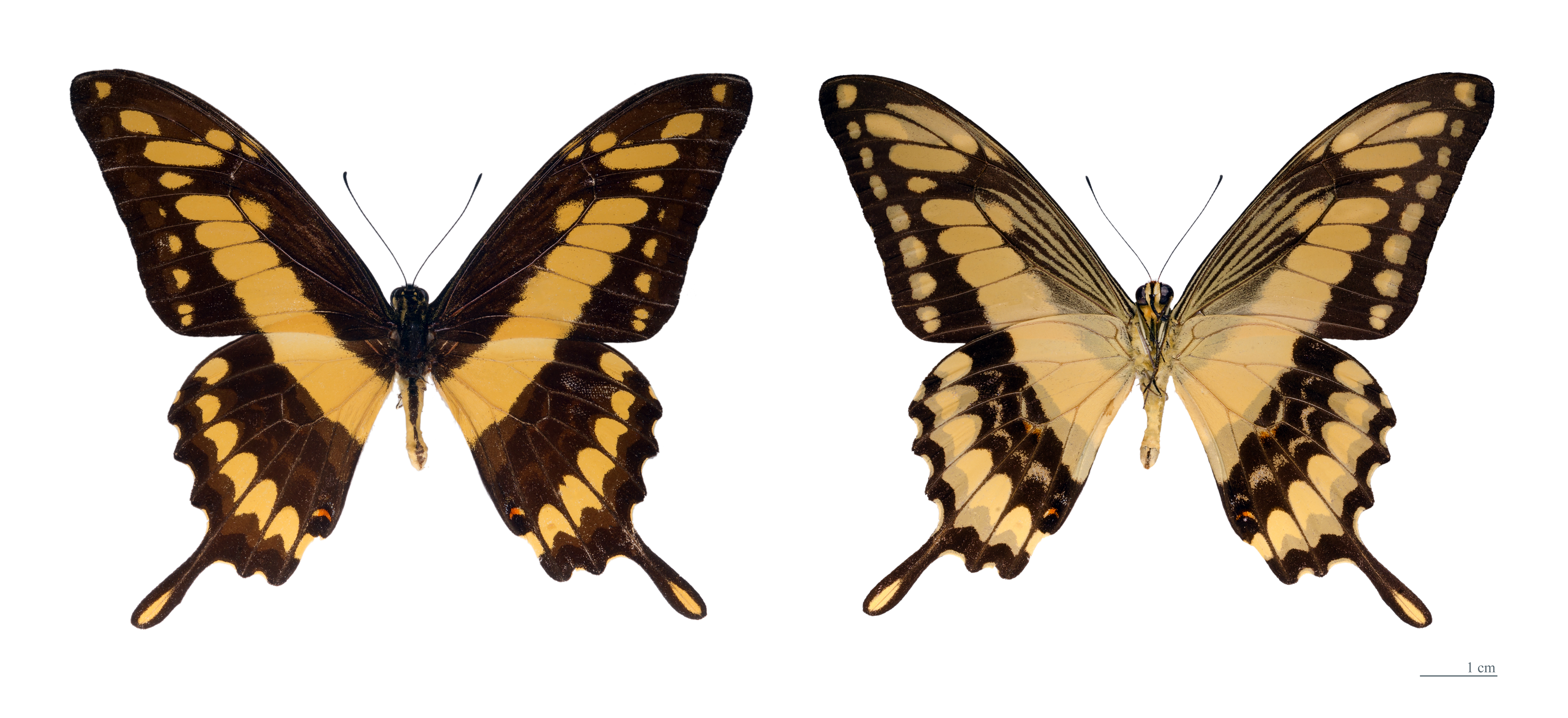
Dorsal and ventral view

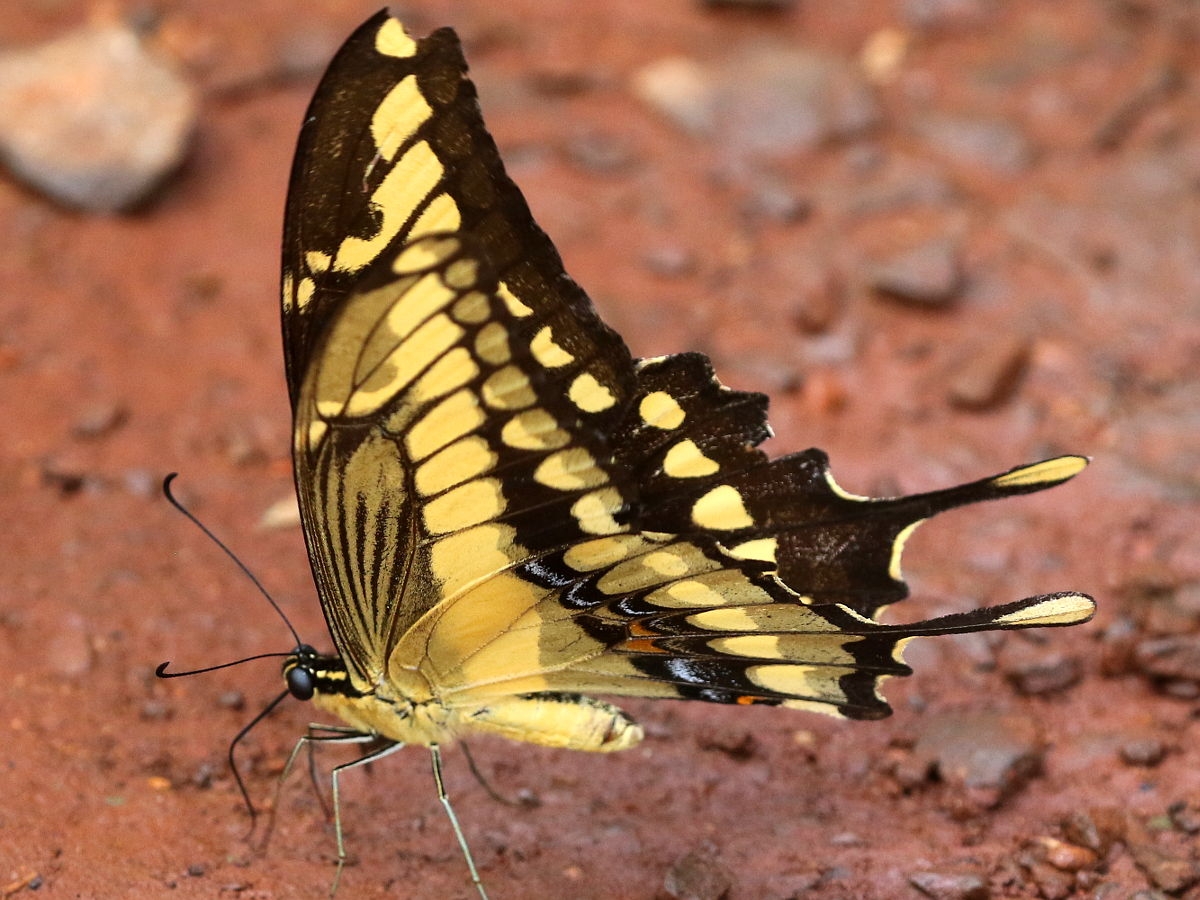
Underside Iguazu Falls
