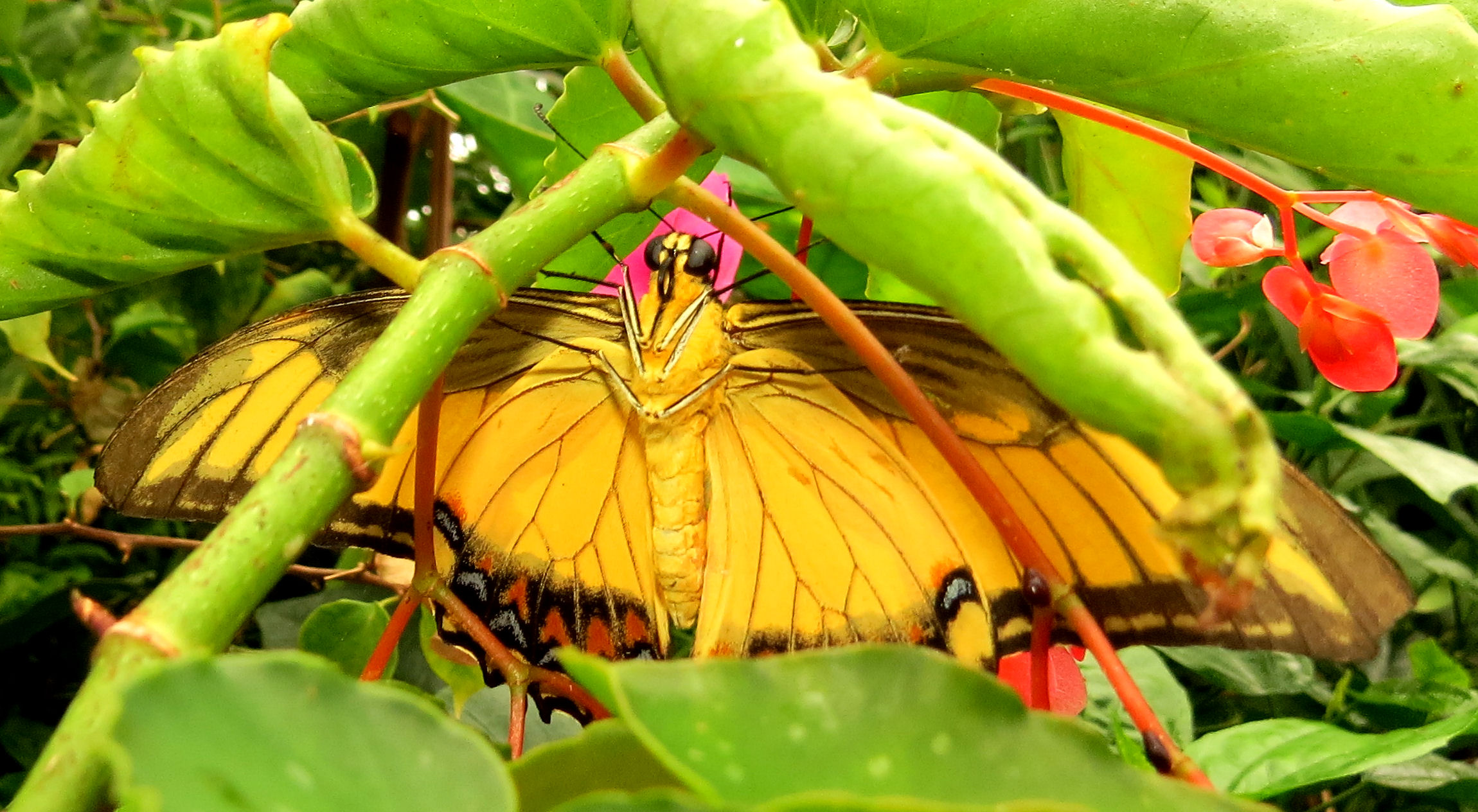
- Male, underside
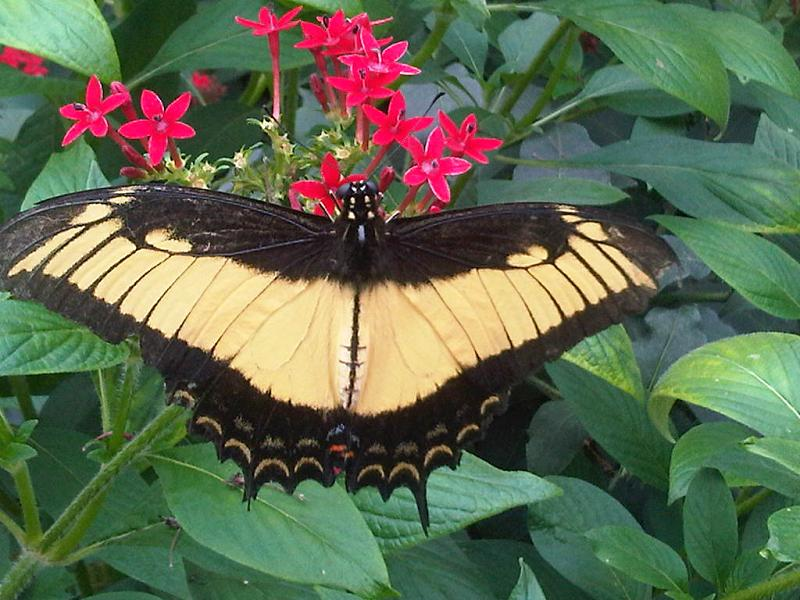
- Male, topside

Scientific classification
- Kingdom: Animalia
- Phylum: Arthropoda
- Class: Insecta
- Order: Lepidoptera
- Family: Papilionidae
- Genus: Papilio
- Species: P. androgeus

Binomial name
- Papilio androgeus Cramer, [1775]

Synonyms
- Calaides androgeus; Heraclides androgeus; Papilio laodocus Fabricius, 1793; Papilio epidaurus Godman & Salvin, [1890]; Papilio altheae Fabricius, 1938 (preocc., repl. name); Papilio hibisci Fabricius, 1938 (repl. name); Papilio androgeos; Papilio piranthus Cramer, 1779; Papilio polycaon Cramer, 1779

= Papilio androgeus =

Androgeus swallowtail

Species of butterfly

Papilio androgeus, the Androgeus swallowtail, queen page, or queen swallowtail, is a Neotropical butterfly of the family Papilionidae. It is found from Mexico to Argentina with a small population in southern Florida.

== Description ==
There is strong sexual dimorphism between the sexes . The wingspan is 134 to 140 millimeters. [1] All wings have a black-brown base colour.

The males have very broad yellow bands on the upper side of the fore and hind wings. Indistinct yellowish and bluish spots are present on the outer edge of the hindwings, which are sometimes absent. The underside shows a similar pattern to the forewings, but is much paler and less clear, while the spots on the outer edges are somewhat more pronounced.

The females are more variable with regard to the markings. They often have large white spots on the dark upper surface of the forewings, but these can also be completely absent. The hind wings shimmer more or less metallic blue or turquoise and show blue-green spots on the outer edge. On the brownish underside of the wings there are three rows of crescent-shaped spots of red, blue and yellow on the outer edge of the hind wings.Both sexes have five to six narrow, unmarked, blackish tails on the hind wings, one of which is somewhat elongated.

Adult caterpillars are olive green to blackish brown in color. An orange line can be seen in the neck area. A green-white, saddle-shaped thickening stands out in the middle of the body. There are also some small warts on the back that show bluish spots. [2]

The pupa is dark brown with cream vertical stripes. The wing sheaths shimmer greenish.

piranthus Male P. androgeus has on the forewing two large yellow patches, sometimes also a small spot; in the female P. piranthus these spots are wanting or are merely indicated, the metallic scaling of the hindwing is not dense and extends into the cell.

== Description in Seitz ==
P. androgeus. As in the preceding species the sexes are different and the female occurs in many districts in two forms. Tail narrow, pointed. Hindwing above with narrow bluish submarginal crescents, beneath with a regular row of reddish yellow crescents between cell and outer margin. Larva on Citrus; similar to that of P. lycophron; as in that species the pupa has on the upperside of the abdomen two rows of small tubercles. The butterfly is common in the open country, in gardens and at the edges of woods. West Indies and Mexico southwards to Paraguay and South Brazil. — epidaurus Godm. & Salv. occurs on Cuba, Haiti and St. Lucia and also inhabits Central America from Mexico to Panama.male: the yellow area very broad: male: forewing with indications of a yellow band outside the cell; the grey-blue scaling on the hindwing dense. — androgeus Cr. (male= policaon Cr.) (10a).male: the yellow area less pale than in the following subspecies. female in two forms: female-f. androgeus Cr. (10a) has on the forewing two large yellow patches, sometimes also a small spot; in the female-f. piranthus Cr. these spots are wanting or are merely indicated, the metallic scaling of the hindwing is not dense and extends into the cell. From Colombia to Bolivia, Matto Grosso and Paré. — laodocus F. (10a) inhabits Brazil proper, southwards to Parana. The yellow area of the male is pale, the small spots placed before the extremity of the cell are smaller and often entirely wanting. Only one female-f. known; this is similar to the female-f. androgeus of the preceding subspecies, but the upper yellow spot is smaller than the second. n

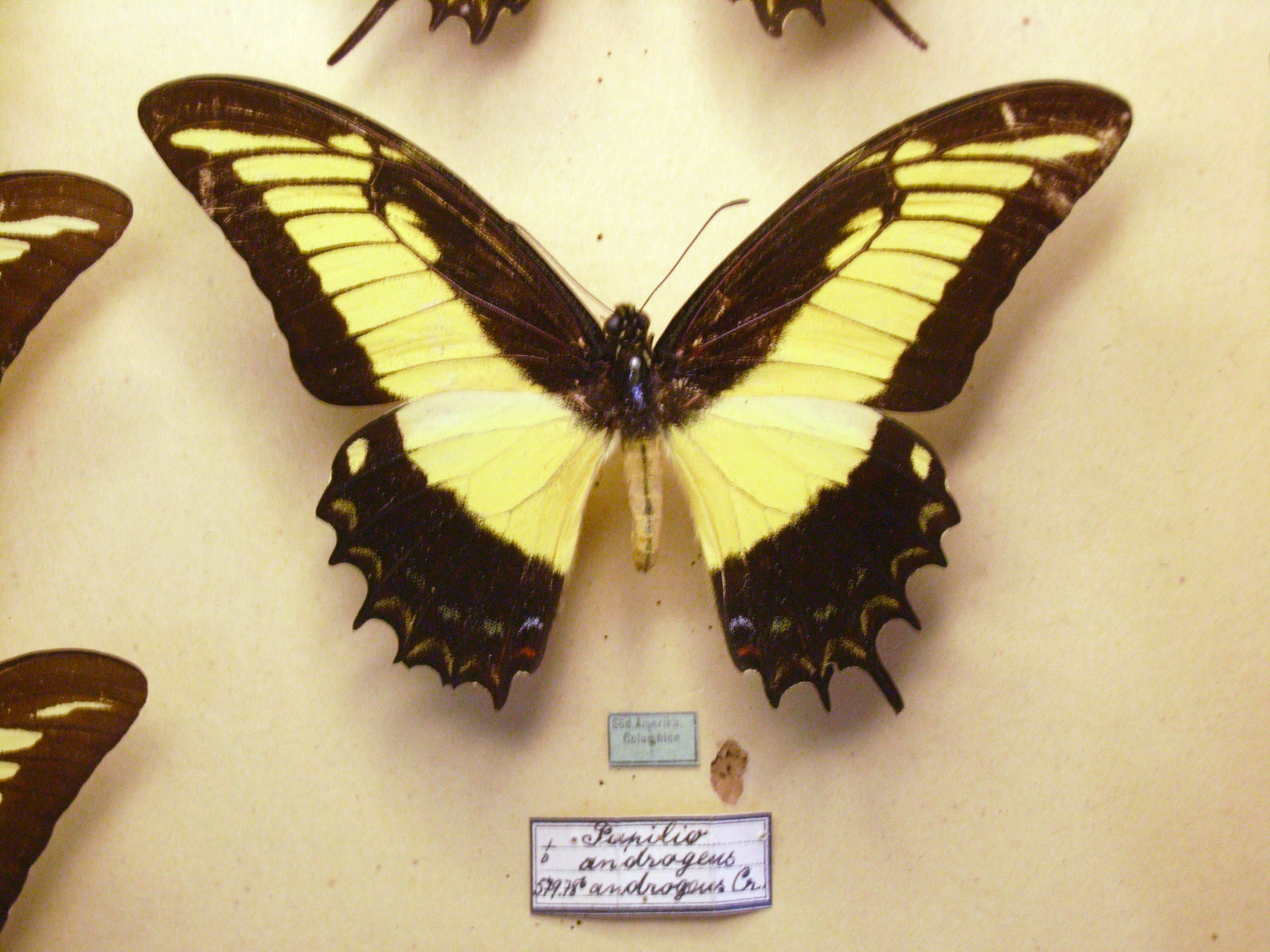
Male

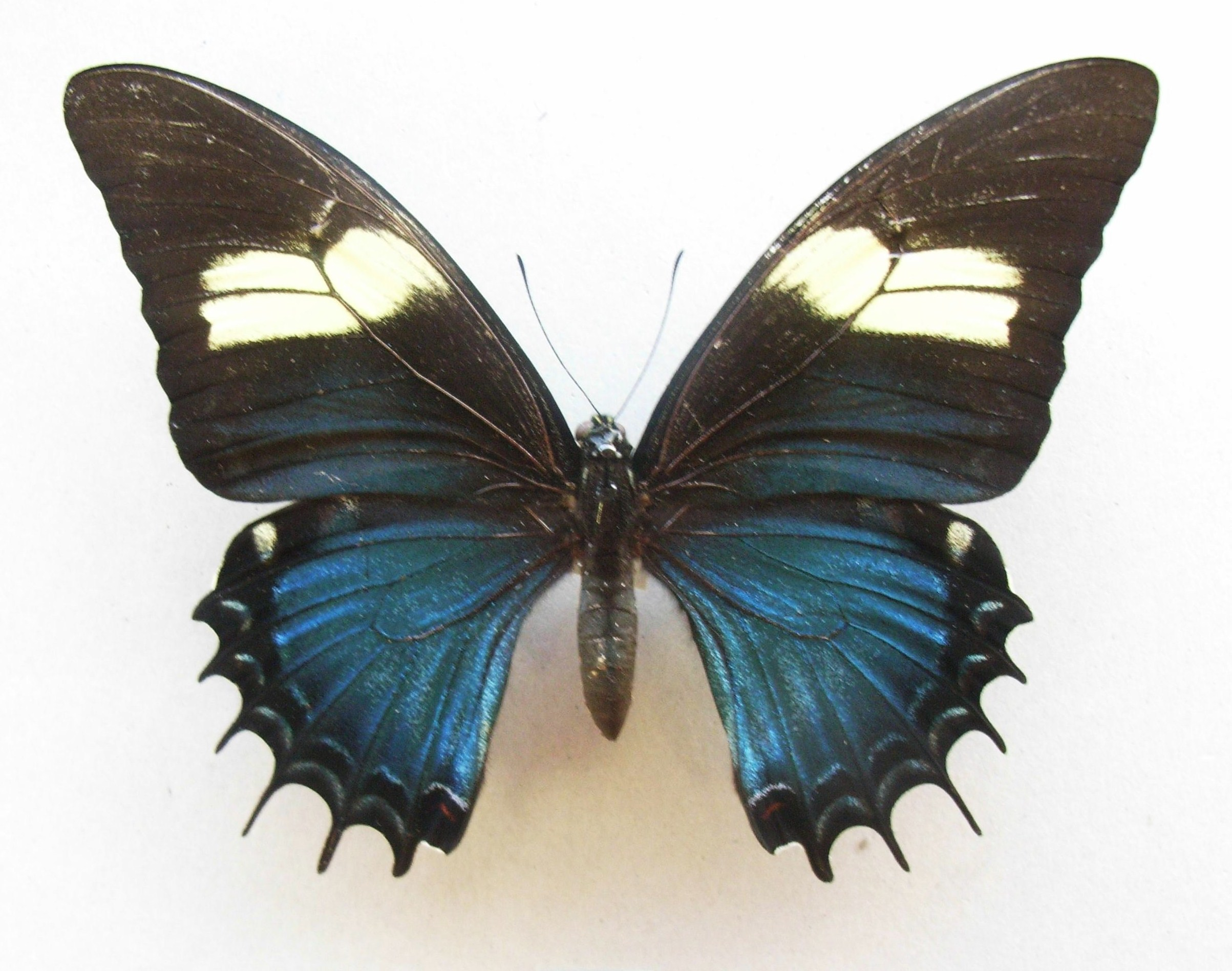
Female

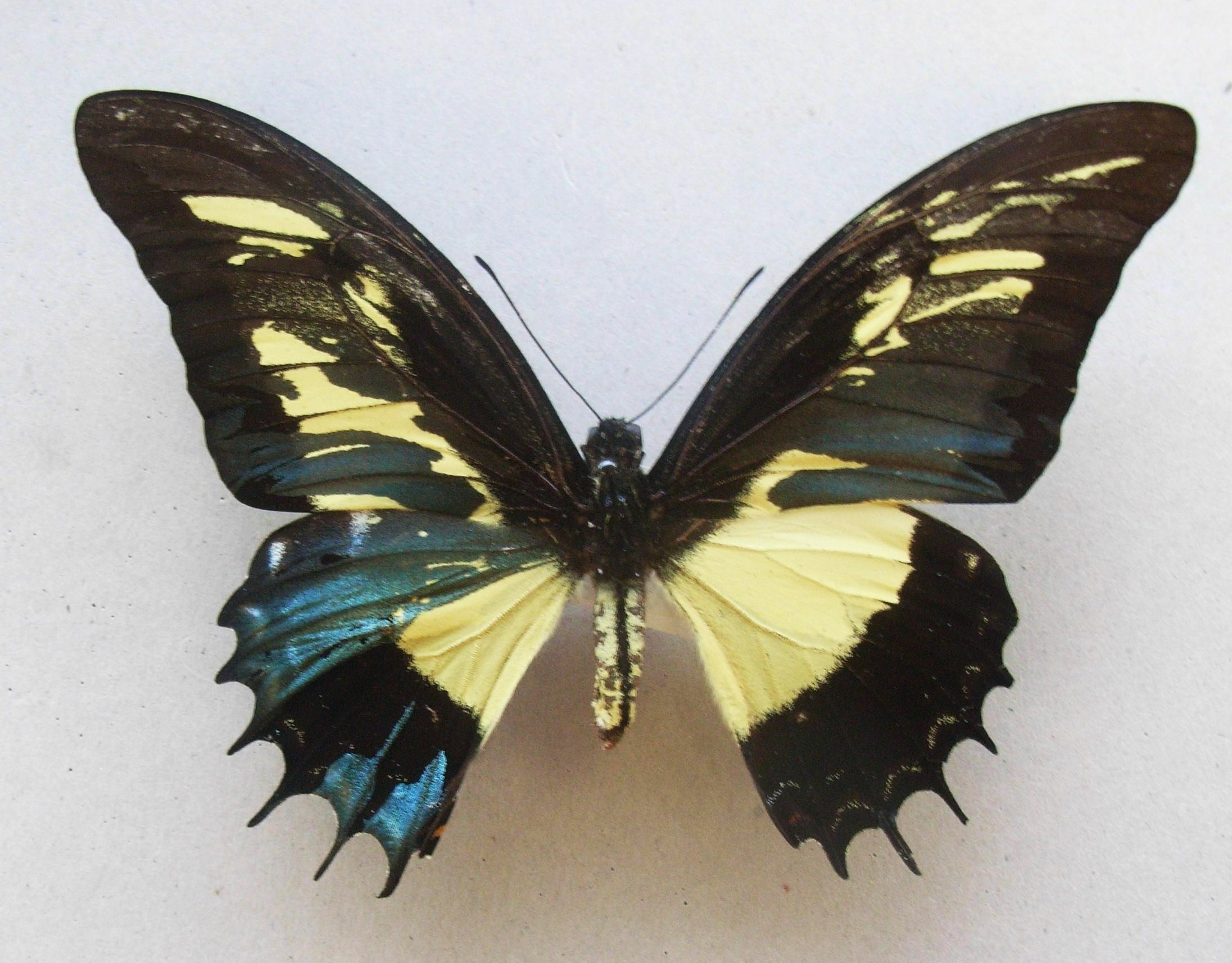
Gynandromorph

== Biology ==
Adults are on wing from April to October in multiple generations per year.

The larvae feed on the leaves of Zanthoxylum elephantiasis, Citrus reticulata, and Citrus sinensis. Adults feed on nectar of various flowers.

== Subspecies ==
- Papilio androgeus androgeus – (Suriname, Colombia, Ecuador to Bolivia, Brazil (Amazonas, Pará, Mato Grosso))
- Papilio androgeus epidaurus Godman & Salvin, 1890 – (Florida, Mexico, Panama, Cuba to Santa Lucia) male: the yellow area very broad: female: forewing with indications of a yellow band outside the cell; the grey-blue scaling on the hindwing dense.
- Papilio androgeus laodocus (Fabricius, 1793) – (Brazil (Minas Gerais, Paraná), Paraguay, Argentina) the yellow area of the male is pale, the small spots placed before the extremity of the cell are smaller and often entirely wanting. Only one female known; this is similar to the female androgeus of the nominate subspecies, but the upper yellow spot is smaller than the second.

== Threats ==
Generally common and not so far threatened. Tolerant of open areas and secondary growth.

== Taxonomy ==
Papilio androgeus is a member of the Papilio thoas species group.

== Sources ==
- Lewis, H. L. (1974). Butterflies of the World ISBN 0-245-52097-X Page 24, figures 11 (female), 12 (male).
