= Papilio aristor =

Scarce Haitian swallowtail

Conservation status
- Near Threatened (IUCN 3.1)

Scientific classification
- Kingdom: Animalia
- Phylum: Arthropoda
- Clade: Pancrustacea
- Class: Insecta
- Order: Lepidoptera
- Family: Papilionidae
- Genus: Papilio
- Species: P. aristor

Binomial name
- Papilio aristor Godart, 1819

Species of butterfly

Papilio aristor, the scarce Haitian swallowtail, is a species of butterfly in the family Papilionidae. It is endemic to Hispaniola (the Dominican Republic and Haiti).

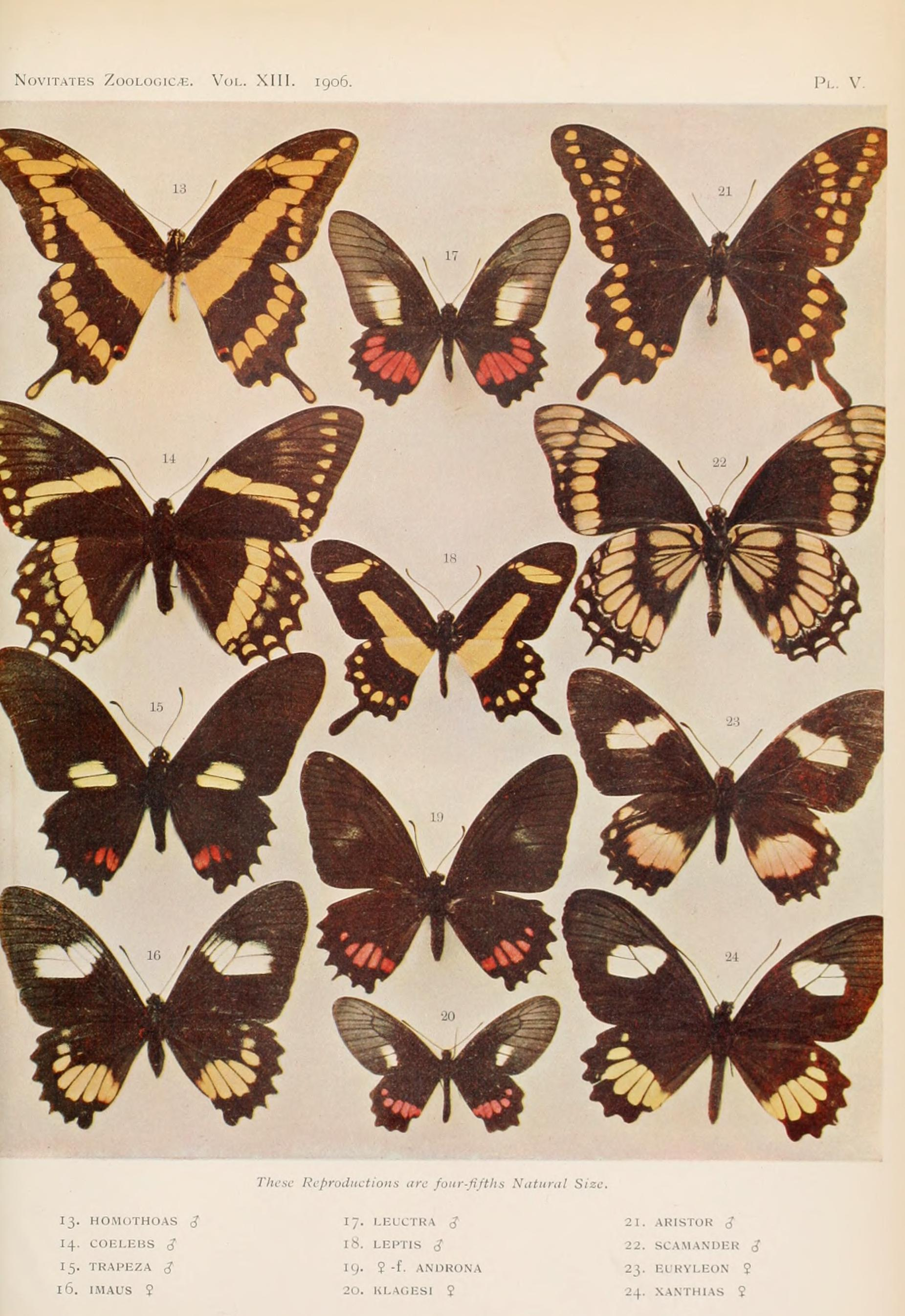
Papilio aristor and other Papilionidae in Novitates Zoologicae

== Description ==
Forewing with two rows of yellow spots; the discal row curved, not extending to the hindmargin, the outer row complete; hindwing with a row of yellow spots. Underside of the forewing with a yellow spot in the cell.

== Seitz ==
P. aristor Godt. (8d). From Haiti; the only known specimen (Godart's name-type, which was in the Paris Museum, seems to have been destroyed) is in the large collection of Mons. Charles Oberthur; found near Port au Prince. Forewing with two rows of yellow spots; the discal row curved, not extending to the hindmargin, the outer row complete; hindwing with a row of yellow spots. Underside of the forewing with a yellow spot in the cell.Karl Jordan.

== Biology ==
It is known to inhabit xeric areas of lowland country in the Dominican Republic, and probably in Haiti also. as a member of the thoas species-group P. aristor is likely to feed on Rutaceae, Piperaceae or Umbelliferae.Adult are known to be on the wing in July.

== Taxonomy ==
Papilio aristor is a member of the Papilio thoas species group.
