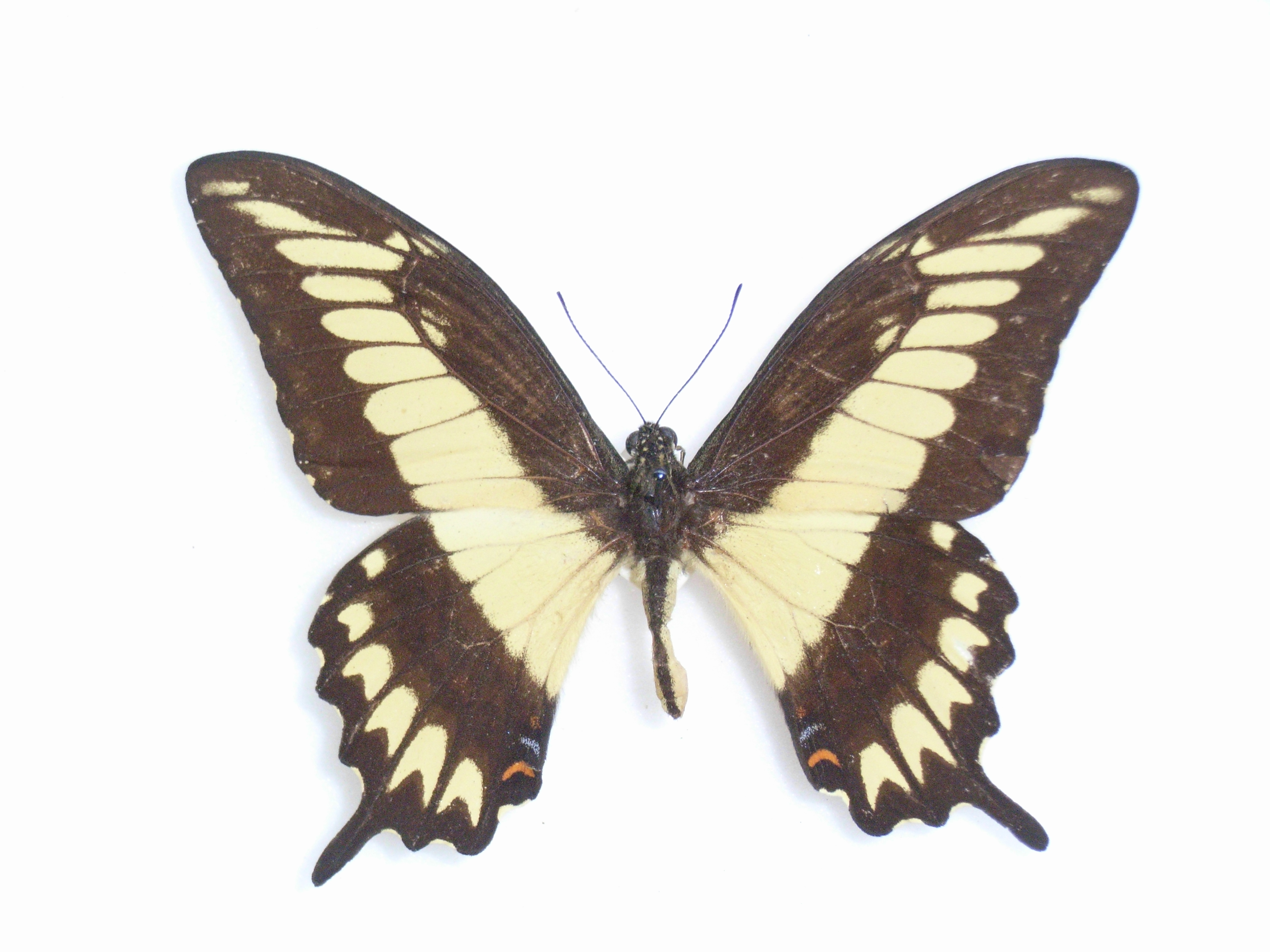

Scientific classification
- Kingdom: Animalia
- Phylum: Arthropoda
- Clade: Pancrustacea
- Class: Insecta
- Order: Lepidoptera
- Family: Papilionidae
- Genus: Papilio
- Species: P. ornythion

Binomial name
- Papilio ornythion Boisduval, 1836

Synonyms
- Calaides ornythion; Heraclides ornythion

= Papilio ornythion =

Species of butterfly

Papilio ornythion, the ornythion swallowtail, is a swallowtail butterfly of the subfamily Papilioninae. It is found in Mexico and Guatemala. It is occasionally recorded from central and southern Texas and New Mexico and rarely from southern Arizona and Kansas.

The wingspan is 83–115 millimetres (3.3–4.5 in). On the obverse the wings are black, with a pale yellow band crossed by black veins and bear a few pale yellow spots above the cell and in the submarginal part. The hindwings bear a pale yellow stripe in the extension of that of the forewings, a series of submarginal pale yellow macules and an orange lunule surmounted by an iridescent blue lunule in the anal angle. They are extended with black tails. On the reverse, the wings are predominantly pale yellow. The fore wings are similarly patterned but the black parts are striped with yellow, the hind wings are pale yellow edged with black and have a row of orange lunules edged with black in the middle part.

The female has two forms, a form identical to the male and a dark form. In the latter, the median band of the forewings and hindwings is absent on the obverse, while the reverse is predominantly black, with submarginal pale yellow macules on the hindwings in addition to the median orange lunules.

The body is pale yellow and black above. It is darker in the dark form.

Adults are on wing from April to September. There are probably two generations per year.

The larvae feed on the leaves of Citrus trees. Adults feed on flower nectar.

== Taxonomy ==
Papilio ornythion is a member of the Papilio thoas species group.
