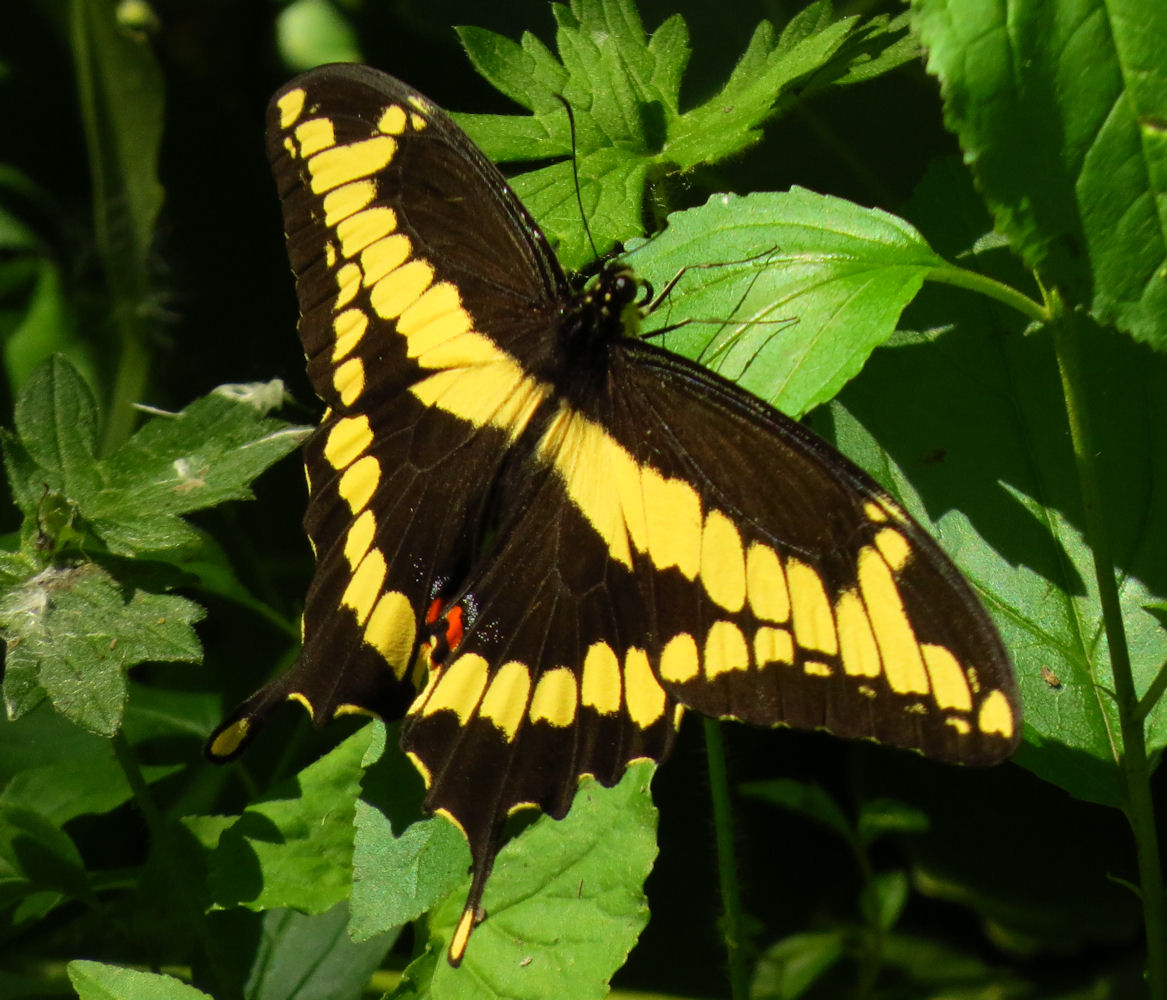

Conservation status
- Secure (NatureServe)

Scientific classification
- Kingdom: Animalia
- Phylum: Arthropoda
- Clade: Pancrustacea
- Class: Insecta
- Order: Lepidoptera
- Family: Papilionidae
- Genus: Papilio
- Species: P. cresphontes

Binomial name
- Papilio cresphontes Cramer, [1777]

Synonyms
- Heraclides cresphontes Cramer, [1777] Heraclides oxilus Hübner, [1819] Papilio cresphontes var. maxwelli Franck, 1919; Papilio cresphontes pennsylvanicus F. Chermock & R. Chermock, 1945

= Papilio cresphontes =

Eastern giant swallowtail

Species of butterfly

The eastern giant swallowtail (Papilio cresphontes) is the largest butterfly in North America. It is abundant through many parts of eastern North America; populations from western North America and down into Panama are now (as of 2014) considered to belong to a different species, Papilio rumiko. Though it is often valued in gardens for its striking appearance, its larval stage can be a serious pest to citrus farms, which has earned its caterpillars the names orange dog or orange puppy. The eastern giant swallowtail caterpillars possess remarkable camouflage from predators by closely resembling bird droppings. They use this, along with their osmeteria, to defend against predators such as wasps, flies, and vertebrates.

== Geographic range ==
The eastern giant swallowtail is common across the United States, reaching as far north as southern New England and southern Canada. South of the United States, it is found in parts of Mexico and also found in Jamaica and Cuba. The species was historically considered to occur in the western United States and into South America, but now those populations are treated as a separate species, the western giant swallowtail (Papilio rumiko), based largely on DNA evidence.

== Habitat ==
In the United States, P. cresphontes mostly inhabit deciduous forest and citrus orchards. They are only capable of overwintering in Florida and the deep South.

== Description ==
One of the eastern giant swallowtail's most notable features is its size. Females have an average wingspan of 5.5 in (14 cm), and up to 6.9 in (18 cm), while males' average is 5.8 in (15 cm), and up to 7.4 in (19 cm).

The wings are black with a horizontal yellow line across the forewings, and a diagonal yellow line across the hindwing. The underside of the wings is yellow with accents of black. A small patch of red on the ventral wing (within the small blue band) allows for distinction from the similar-looking Schaus' swallowtail. Seitz -"P. cresphontes Cr. (7a). Usually considered a slightly different variety of P. thoas. No cell-spot on the forewing; the fifth discal spot projecting further than the sixth. Claspers of the male separate above, the anal hook quite short, the lower part of the anal segment likewise quite different from that of P. thoas; harpe broad, rounded. A common species in eastern North America, occurring as far as Costa Rica in the south and southern Canada in the north; but the insect is a wanderer, which is found only now and then in the northern districts. In the United States it does not extend westward beyond the Mississippi plain, except in the Southern States. Its true home is the region adjoining the Gulf of Mexico. It occurs also on Cuba. Papilio cresphontes is a member of the Papilio thoas species group. '

== Food resources ==
=== Caterpillars ===
As well as eating valuable citrus crops, larvae eat a wide variety of plants in the family Rutaceae (citrus plants), including different types of prickly ash and common hoptree. They also consume some exotic Rutaceae species that have been introduced to North America, such as gasplant, rue and sapote.

==== Feeding specialization ====
In specific local subpopulations (studied in Wisconsin, Ohio, and Florida), it was found that eastern giant swallowtail caterpillars do better on their local host plant than on other giant swallowtail host plants. The local host caused the larva to develop faster than other plants that were also edible to the larva. However, this feeding specialization hypothesis has not been tested in the species as a whole beyond these three regions.

=== Adults ===
Nectar plants for adults include Lantana, Azaleas, Bougainvilla, Saponaria officinalis, Hesperis matronalis, Solidago, Lonicera japonica, and Asclepias incarnata. Along with flower nectar, adults can also consume liquid from animal waste.

== Life history ==
=== Eggs ===
Females lay eggs on the tops of the leaves of one of their preferred host plants. This is because the first larval instars are unable to move from plant to plant, so the mother must select an appropriate plant to support them. One egg is lain at a time, as opposed to in clutches. The small egg (1–1.5 mm) is brownish colored, but appears more orange due to a special orange colored secretion.

=== Caterpillars ===
Once emerged from the eggs, there are five larval instars, wherein the larva grow to about 2 inches before pupating. Larvae are mostly nocturnal, feeding at night. Their appearance changes slightly throughout the instars, with the younger ones having setae and the older instars lacking setae. The caterpillars have remarkable camouflage patterns.

=== Pupation ===
Larvae must find a vertical plant, or sometimes a man-made object, to form their chrysalis on, and often they choose the host plant they already occupy. They attach themselves to their substrate of choice and molt to reveal a brown, mottled chrysalis (resembling a bit of dead twig) in which they remain for approximately 10–12 days.

=== Mating ===
Males search for females along set flight paths and near host plants, and mate with females in the afternoon. Male and female then copulate facing away from each other.

== Enemies ==
=== Parasites ===
Eastern giant swallowtails are most vulnerable to parasites when they are in their chrysalis. Common parasites include flies and wasps such as Brachymeria robusta, Pteromalus cassotis, Pteromalus vanessae, and Lespesia rileyi.

== Protective coloration and behavior ==
Larvae have many adaptations to protect themselves from predators.

=== Coloration ===
The caterpillars' intricate coloring patterns are an effective camouflage and defense against both vertebrate and invertebrate predators and parasites. It is thought that the coloration was naturally selected for because of its imitation of bird and lizard droppings. The caterpillar mimics certain droppings based on its habitat and which instar it is. The caterpillars' coloration, particularly the saddle pattern, is also thought to be disruptive coloration. This means the coloration makes it harder for a predator to distinguish the shape of the camouflaged prey, which explains the continuation of this coloration pattern in larger instars that are too large to be mistaken for bird droppings. It has also been hypothesized that the older instars' pattern is meant to be reminiscent of a snake.

=== Other defensive measures ===
When camouflage is not enough, larvae will employ their osmeteria when they are threatened. The osmeterium is an organ behind the head that “inflates” into an orange/red Y-shaped growth that resembles a snake's forked tongue. By the fourth instar, the osmeterium is more than just a startle mechanism and also has bad-smelling and toxic mixture of acidic chemicals. This is only effective on small invertebrate predators, and the caterpillar will try to rub its osmeterium on the predator to deter it. It has been experimentally tested and found that osmeteria are ineffective at deterring predation from birds.

== Physiology ==
=== Identifying host plants ===
Eastern giant swallowtail butterflies must correctly identify their host plants by antennal sensitivity to the specific volatile compounds in the plants. A study found that antennal response to these volatiles depends upon the concentration of the volatiles, the host plant of origin (whether it is a primary or secondary host), and the sex of the butterfly. This last dependency is thought to be because the females, not the males, must identify the correct host plant for egg laying.

=== Flight ===
Because of the butterfly's notably large wingspan (14 to 18 cm), eastern giant swallowtails are very strong fliers and are able to glide long distances with very few wing beats.

== Interactions with humans ==
Sometimes referred to as "orange dogs", "orange pups", or "bird poop caterpillars" by farmers, the larva targets all varieties of citrus plants, often causing significant damage to new foliage and younger trees, which they can more thoroughly defoliate. Large mature citrus trees are not generally significantly impacted. Outside of farms, the species is valued for its aesthetic appeal and can also be raised to butterflies successfully at home.

=== Control ===
Biological insecticides, such as Bacillus thuringiensis, as well as chemical insecticides, are used to protect trees against larvae. Methionine, an essential amino acid in humans, has also been found to be an effective killer of caterpillars, with possible use as a nontoxic pesticide against eastern giant swallowtail larvae.

== Effects of climate change ==
There has been a northern expansion of the range of the eastern giant swallowtail in recent years, which has been linked to increasingly warm temperatures, and particularly to a lack of September frosts in regions of expansion starting in 2001. Larvae were then able to withstand a few frosts before they pupated. The immediate effects of this warming, as well as their effect on host plants and predators, can explain the giant swallowtail's range expansion.

== Gallery ==
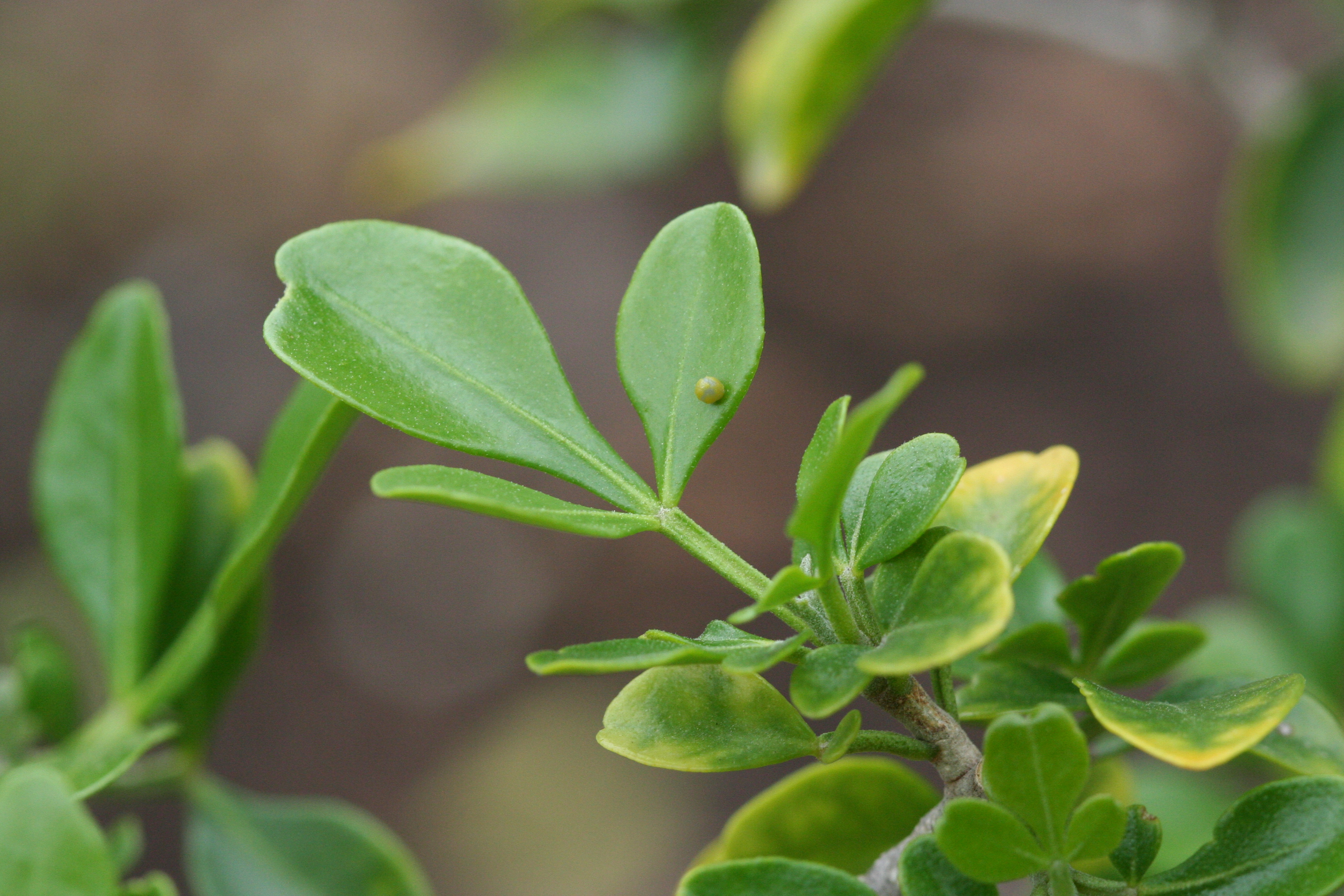
Egg

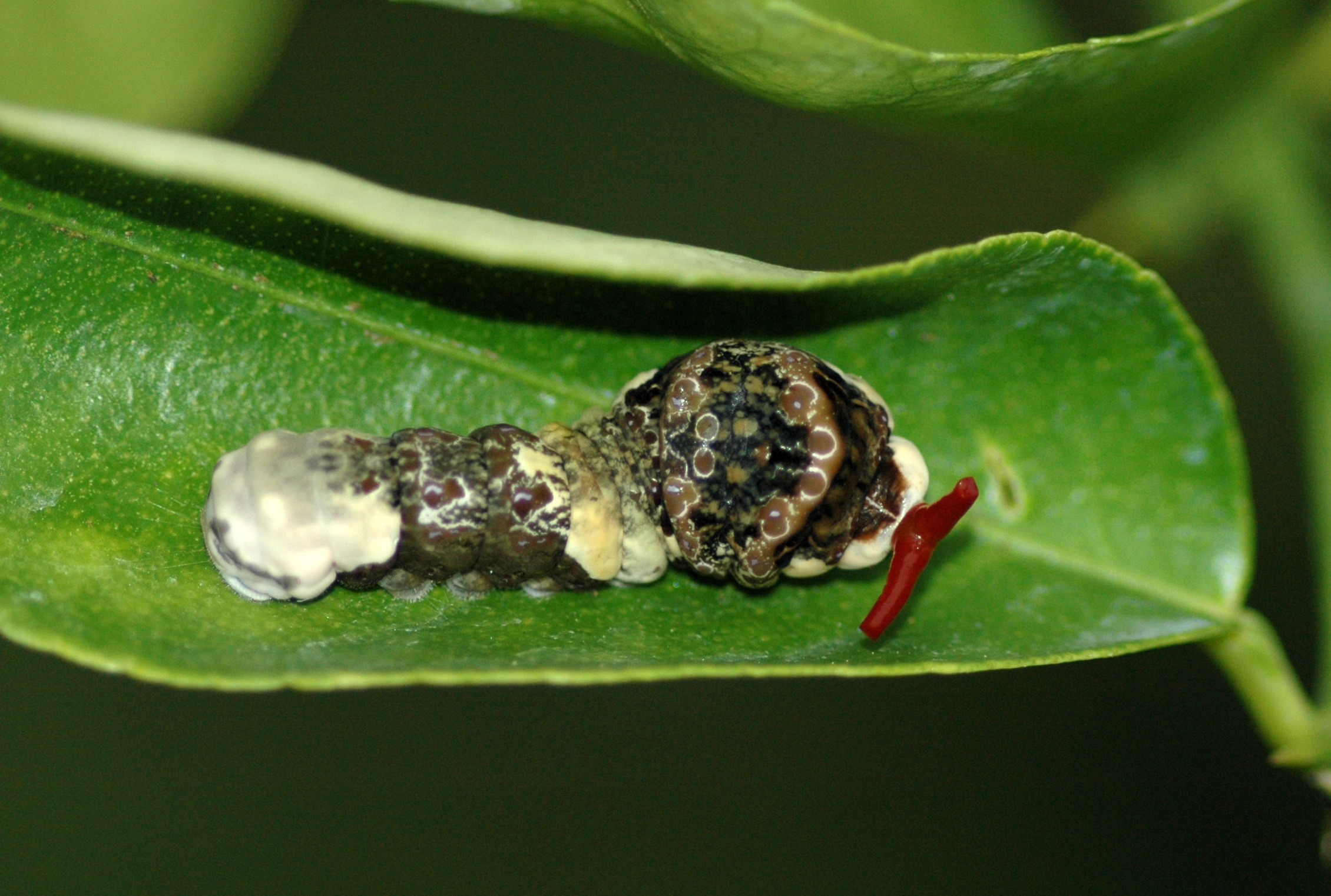
P. cresphontes caterpillar showing defensive posture

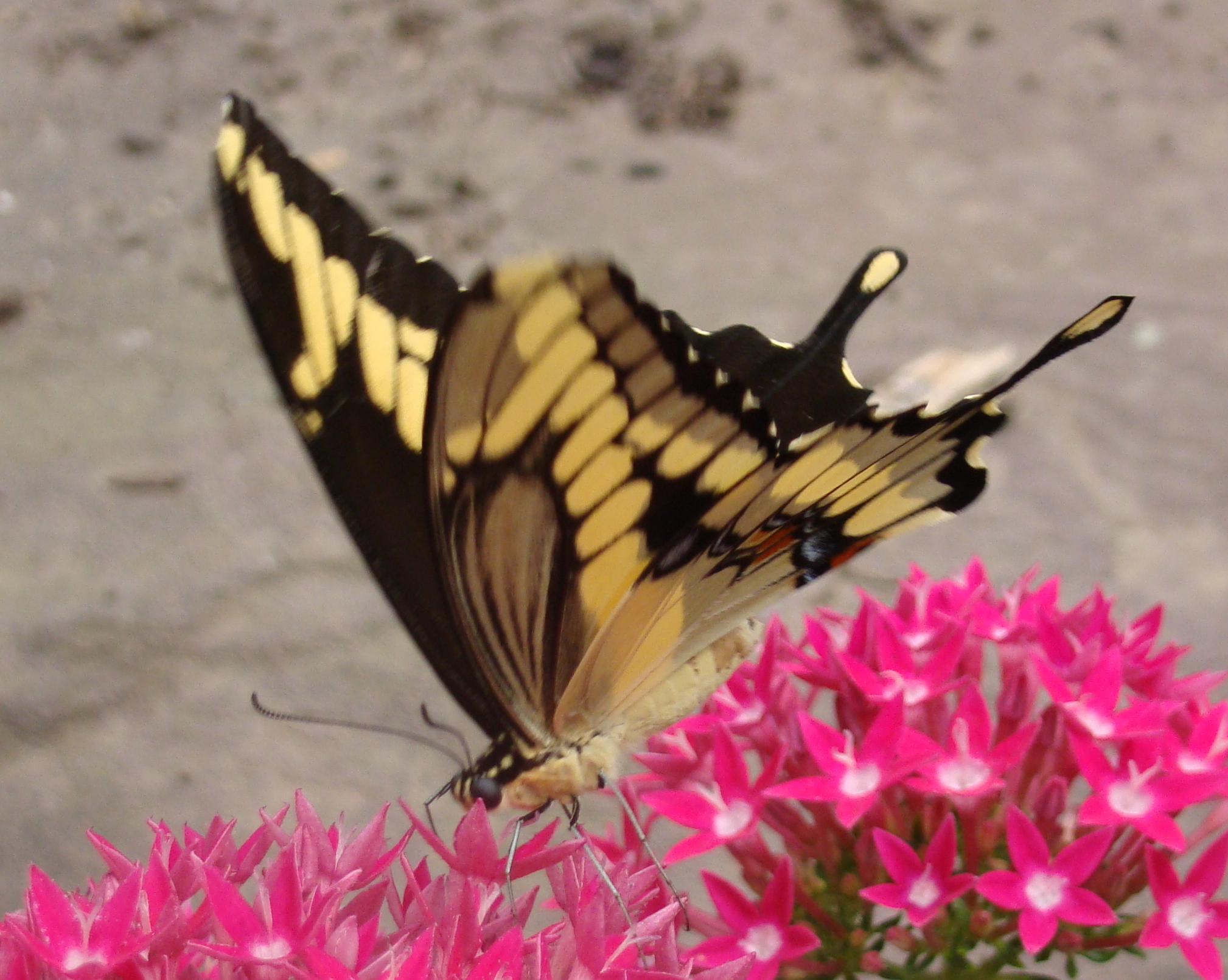
Adult, underside

In flight. Video clip
