= List of butterflies of Belize =

Location of Belize

This is a list of butterflies of Belize. According to a recent estimate, there are about 700 butterfly species in Belize.

== Papilionidae ==
=== Papilioninae ===
- Battus philenor acauda
- Battus polydamas polydamas
- Battus laodamas copanae
- Battus chalceus ingenuus
- Battus lycidas
- Parides photinus
- Parides montezuma tulana
- Parides eurimedes mylotes
- Parides childrenae childrenae
- Parides sesostris zestos
- Parides panares lycimenes
- Parides erithalion polyzelus
- Parides iphidamas iphidamas
- Protographium epidaus epidaus
- Protographium philolaus philolaus
- Protographium agesilaus neosilaus
- Protographium dioxippus lacandones
- Protographium calliste calliste
- Protographium thyastes marchandii
- Eurytides salvini
- Protesilaus macrosilaus penthesilaus
- Mimoides thymbraeus thymbraeus
- Mimoides ilus branchus
- Mimoides phaon phaon
- Heraclides pharnaces rogeri
- Heraclides erostratus erostratus
- Heraclides anchisiades idaeus
- Heraclides torquatus tolus
- Heraclides ornythion
- Heraclides astyalus pallas
- Heraclides androgeus epidaurus
- Heraclides thoas autocles
- Heraclides paeon thrason
- Papilio cresphontes
- Papilio polyxenes asterius
- Pterourus garamas electryon
- Pterourus menatius victorinus

== Pieridae ==
=== Dismorphinae ===
- Enantia licinia marion
- Enantia albania albania
- Dismorphia eunoe eunoe
- Dismorphia amphione praxinoe
- Dismorphia theucharila fortunata

=== Pierinae ===
- Archonias tereas approximata
- Charonias eurytele nigrescens
- Melete florinda florinda
- Melete isandra
- Appias drusilla drusilla
- Itaballia demophile calydonia
- Itaballia pandosia kicaha
- Pieriballia viardi laogore
- Perrhybris pamela
- Ascia monuste monuste
- Ganyra josephina josepha

=== Coliadinae ===
- Zerene cesonia cesonia
- Anteos clorinde
- Anteos maerula
- Kricogonia lyside lyside
- Phoebis rurina intermedia
- Phoebis philea philea
- Phoebis argante argante
- Phoebis agarithe agarithe
- Phoebis sennae marcellina
- Phoebis trite trite
- Aphrissa statira jada
- Aphrissa boisduvalii
- Eurema proterpia
- Eurema mexicana mexicana
- Eurema xanthochlora
- Eurema boisduvaliana
- Eurema dina westwoodi
- Eurema albula
- Eurema nise nelphe
- Eurema lisa lisa
- Eurema nicippe
- Eurema daira lydia
- Nathalis iole

== Riodinidae ==
=== Euselasiinae ===
- Hades noctula
- Euselasia aurantiaca
- Euselasia cataleuca
- Euselasia hieronymi
- Euselasia mys
- Euselasia pusilla

=== Riodininae ===
- Perophthalma tullius lasius
- Leucochimona nivalis
- Leucochimona vestalis
- Mesosemia gaudiolum
- Mesosemia lamachus
- Mesosemia methion
- Napaea eucharila
- Napaea umbra
- Eurybia lycisca
- Eurybia patrona persona
- Lyropteryx lyra cleadas
- Ancyluris inca inca
- Ancyluris jurgenseni
- Rhetus periander
- Rhetus arcius thia
- Melanis iarbas
- Melanis pixe pixe
- Isapis agyrtus hera
- Lepricornis strigosus
- Baeotis zonata
- Caria lampeto
- Charis auius
- Charis gynaea zama
- Charis velutina
- Calephelis argyrodines
- Calephelis browni
- Calephelis clenchi
- Calephelis fulmen
- Calephelis maya
- Calephelis stallingsi
- Calephelis tikal
- Calephelis yucatana
- Calephelis wellingi wellingi
- Lasaia sula
- Lasaia agesilas
- Lasaia oileus
- Mesene celetes
- Mesene croceella
- Mesene leucopus
- Mesene phareus rubella
- Esthemopsis alicia
- Chimastrum argentea
- Symmachia accusatrix
- Symmachia probetor
- Anteros carausius carausius
- Sarota craspediodinata
- Sarota chrysus dematria
- Calydna lusca venusta
- Calydna sturnula hegias
- Emesis lucinda aurima
- Emesis mandana
- Emesis lupina
- Emesis saturata
- Emesis ocipore
- Emesis tegula
- Emesis tenedia
- Emesis vulpina
- Pachythone ignifer
- Apodemia hypoglauca wellingi
- Thisbe irenea belides
- Thisbe lycorias lycorias
- Lemonias agave
- Juditha ascolides
- Juditha molpe
- Synargis mycone
- Synargis nymphidioides
- Pandemos godmanii
- Calosphila cilissa
- Hypophyla sudias
- Caliocasma lilina
- Theope basilea
- Theope cratylus
- Theope diores
- Theope virgilius
- Nymphidium ascolia

== Lycaenidae ==
=== Theclinae ===
- Eumaeus childrenae
- Eumaeus toxea
- Arcas cypria
- Evenus regalis
- Evenus telemus antinous
- Evenus gabriela
- Pseudolycaena damo
- Theritas mavors
- Cycnus phaleros
- Thereus citonius cambes
- Thereus lausus
- Panthiades battus jalan
- Panthiades bitias bitias
- Panthiades ochus
- Arawacus jada
- Arawacus phaea
- Arawacus phaenna
- Arawacus sito
- Arawacus togarna
- Pendantus sethon
- Celmia celmus
- Tmolus cydrara
- Tmolus dolium
- Tmolus echiolus
- Ministrymon maevia
- Ministrymon azia
- Ministrymon scopas
- Ministrymon coronata
- Oenomaus ortygnus
- Oenomais rustan
- Allosmaitia pion
- Chalybs janias
- Janthecla janthodonia
- Thecla halciones
- Thecla conoveria
- Ocaria thales
- Thecla empusa
- Siderus tephraeus
- Parrhasius polibetes
- Parrhasius orgia melissa
- Michaelus ira
- Cyanophrys miserabilis
- Cyanophrys herodotus
- Rekoa marius
- Rekoa meton
- Rekoa palegon
- Orcya ahola
- Atlides bacis
- Atlides polybe
- Brangas caraunus
- Calystryma trebula
- Calycopis isobeon
- Electrostrymon denarius
- Serratofalca sasha
- Mercedes demonassa
- Mercedes mimas
- Ziegleria hesperitis
- Gigantorubra shueyi
- Strymon albata sedecia
- Strymon bazochii
- Strymon bubastus
- Strymon cestri
- Strymon columella
- Strymon mulucha
- Strymon serapio
- Strymon yojoa
- Strymon basilides
- Strymon gabatha
- Thecla barajo

=== Polyommatinae ===
- Brephidium exilis exilis
- Leptotes cassius striata
- Leptotes marina
- Zizula cyna tulliola
- Hemiargus ceraunus gyas
- Hemiargus hanno
- Everes comyntas texana

== Nymphalidae ==
=== Libytheidae ===
- Libytheana carinenta mexicana

=== Danainae ===
- Danaus plexippus plexippus
- Danaus gilippus thersippus
- Danaus eresimus montezuma
- Lycorea cleobaea atergatis
- Lycorea ilione albescens
- Anetia thirza thirza

=== Ithomiinae ===
- Tithorea tarricina duenna
- Tithorea harmonia hippothous
- Melinaea ethra imitata
- Thyridia psidii melantho
- Mechanitis lysimnia doryssus
- Mechanitis polymnia lycidice
- Mechanitis menapis saturata
- Napeogenes tolosa tolosa
- Hypothyris euclea valora
- Hypothyris lycaste dionaea
- Ithomia patilla
- Ithomia leila
- Aeria eurimedia pacifica
- Hyposcada virginiana nigricosta
- Oleria zea
- Oleria paula
- Callithomia hezia hedila
- Dircenna klugii
- Dircenna dero euchytma
- Godyris zavaleta sosunga
- Greta oto
- Greta nero
- Greta morgane
- Greta andromica lyra
- Greta anette
- Episcada salvinia
- Hypoleria cassotis
- Pteronymia artena artena
- Pteronymia cotytto

=== Heliconiinae ===
- Euptoieta hegesia hoffmanni
- Actinote pellenea guatemalena
- Actinote anteas
- Philaethria dido diatonica
- Dryadula phaetusa
- Dione juno huascuma
- Agraulis vanillae incarnata
- Dryas iulia moderata
- Eueides aliphera gracilis
- Eueides lineata
- Eueides vibilia vialis
- Eueides procula asidia
- Eueides isabella eva
- Heliconius charithonia vazquezae
- Heliconius cydno galanthus
- Heliconius doris transiens
- Heliconius erato petiverana
- Heliconius hecalesia octavia
- Heliconius hecale zuleika
- Heliconius ismenius telchinia
- Heliconius hortense
- Heliconius sapho leuce
- Heliconius sara

=== Nymphalinae ===
- Chlosyne janais
- Chlosyne gaudealis
- Chlosyne erodyle
- Chlosyne lacinia
- Thessalia theona
- Anthanassa drusilla lelex
- Anthanassa argentea
- Anthanassa ptolyca
- Anthanassa ardys
- Anthanassa tulcis
- Phyciodes phaon
- Phyciodes vesta graphica
- Eresia clara
- Eresia phillyra
- Castilia eranites
- Castilia ofella
- Castilia myia
- Tegosa guatemalena
- Colobura dirce
- Tigridia acesta
- Baeotus baeotus
- Historis odius odius
- Historis acheronta acheronta
- Smyrna blomfildia datis
- Biblis hyperia aganisa
- Mestra amymone
- Hamadryas februa ferentina
- Hamadryas honorina
- Hamadryas feronia farinulenta
- Hamadryas guatemalena guatemalena
- Hamadryas iphthime joannae
- Hamadryas amphinome mexicana
- Hamadryas laodamia saurites
- Ectima erycinoides
- Myscelia cyaniris cyaniris
- Myscelia ethusa ethusa
- Dynamine theseus
- Dynamine thalassina
- Dynamine mylitta
- Dynamine artemisia glauce
- Dynamine dyonis
- Marpesia petreus
- Marpesia chiron marius
- Marpesia berania
- Marpesia harmonia
- Eunica tatila caerula
- Eunica monima modesta
- Eunica alcmena alcmena
- Temenis laothoe liberia
- Epiphile adrasta adrasta
- Nica flavilla canthara
- Pyrrhogyra neaerea hypsenor
- Pyrrhogyra otolais neis
- Pyrrhogyra crameri
- Pyrrhogyra edocla aenaria
- Catonephele mexicana
- Catonephele numilia esite
- Nessaea aglaura aglaura
- Diaethria anna
- Diaethria astala astala
- Callicore lyca lyca
- Callicore texa titania
- Callicore guatemalena
- Callicore patelina patelina
- Adelpha melanthe
- Adelpha salmoneus salmonides
- Adelpha cytherea marcia
- Adelpha basiloides
- Adelpha iphiclus iphicleolus
- Adelpha massilia
- Adelpha phylaca
- Adelpha naxia epiphicla
- Adelpha ixia leucas
- Adelpha serpa sentia
- Adelpha celerio
- Adelpha fessonia
- Adelpha felderi falcata
- Hypanartia godmani
- Hypanartia lethe
- Siproeta epaphus epaphus
- Siproeta stelenes biplagiata
- Siproeta superba superba
- Anartia fatima
- Anartia jatrophae luteipicta
- Vanessa virginiensis
- Vanessa cardui
- Junonia evarete zonalis
- Junonia genoveva

=== Apaturinae ===
- Doxocopa pavon
- Doxocopa laure
- Asterocampa idyja argus

=== Charaxinae ===
- Prepona dexamenus medinai
- Prepona gnorima
- Prepona omphale octavia
- Archaeoprepona demophon centralis
- Archaeoprepona demophon gulina
- Archaeoprepona meander phoebus
- Archaeoprepona amphimachus amphimachus
- Siderone marthesia
- Zaretis ellops
- Zaretis itys
- Zaretis callidryas
- Consul fabius cecrops
- Consul electra
- Anaea aidea
- Fountainea eurypyle confusa
- Fountainea glycerium
- Memphis moruus boisduvali
- Memphis forreri
- Memphis oenomais
- Memphis hedemanni
- Memphis orthesia
- Memphis xenica
- Memphis artacaena
- Memphis herbacea
- Memphis pithyusa

=== Morphinae ===
- Antirrhea miltiades
- Morpho theseus justitiae
- Morpho polyphemus luna
- Morpho peleides montezuma

=== Brassolinae ===
- Dynastor macrosiris strix
- Dynastor darius stygianus
- Opsiphanes boisduvalii
- Opsiphanes tamarindi tamarindi
- Opsiphanes quiteria quirinus
- Opsiphanes invirae cuspidatus
- Opsiphanes cassina fabricii
- Catoblepia berecynthia whittakeri
- Eryphanis aesacus aesacus
- Caligo oileus scamander
- Caligo illioneus oberon
- Caligo memnon memnon
- Caligo eurilochus sulanus
- Caligo uranus
- Narope cyllastros testacea

=== Satyrinae ===
- Pierella luna heracles
- Manataria maculata
- Cyllopsis wellingi
- Cyllopsis gemma freemani
- Taygetis mermeria excavata
- Taygetis nympha
- Taygetis rufomarginata
- Taygetis leuctra
- Taygetis inconspicua
- Taygetis kerea
- Pseudodebis zimri
- Euptychia westwoodi
- Euptychia mollis
- Megeuptychia antonoe
- Vareuptychia similis
- Vareuptychia usitata pieria
- Cissia confusa
- Cissia pseudoconfusa
- Cissia labe
- Magneuptychia libye
- Pareuptychia metaleuca
- Pareuptychia ocirrhoe
- Ypthimoides remissa
- Hermeuptychia hermes
- Chloreuptychia sericeella
- Cepheuptychia glaucina

== Hesperiidae ==
- Achalarus albociliatus
- Achalarus toxeus
- Achlyodes busirus heros
- Achlyodes mithridates thraso
- Achlyodes tamenund
- Aethilla echina
- Aethilla lavochrea
- Aguna asander
- Aguna aurunce hypozonius
- Aguna claxon
- Aguna metophis
- Aguna panama
- Aides brilla
- Aides dysoni
- Anastrus neaeris
- Anastrus tolimus
- Anatrytone mella
- Anisochoria pedaliodina
- Anisochoria polysticta
- Anthoptus epictetus
- Antigonus corrosus
- Antigonus erosus
- Antigonus nearchus
- Argyrogrammana stilbe holosticta
- Arteurotia tractipennis
- Astraptes alardus
- Astraptes alector hopferi
- Astraptes anaphus annetta
- Astraptes aulestes
- Astraptes creteus crana
- Astraptes egregius
- Astraptes enotrus
- Astraptes fulgerator azul
- Astraptes janeria
- Astraptes phalaecus
- Astraptes talus
- Atarnes sallei
- Autochton aunus
- Autochton bipunctatus
- Autochton longipennis
- Autochton neis
- Autochton zarex
- Behemothia godmanii
- Bolla imbras
- Bungalotis astylos
- Bungalotis midas
- Bungalotis milleri
- Bungalotis quadratum
- Cabares potrillo
- Callimormus alsimo
- Callimormus juventus
- Callimormus saturnus
- Calpodes ethlius
- Camptopleura auxo
- Cantha roraimae
- Carrhenes canescens
- Carrhenes fuscescens
- Carystoides basoches
- Carystoides escalantei
- Carystoides lila
- Carystoides mexicana
- Carystus phorcus
- Celaenorrhinus stola
- Cephise cephise
- Chioides albofasciatus
- Chioides catillus
- Chioides zilpa
- Chiomara mithrax
- Cobalus fidicula
- Codatractus carlos
- Cogia calchas
- Conga chydaea
- Copaeodes minima
- Corticea corticea
- Cymaenes odilia trebius
- Cymaenes tripunctus
- Cynea corope
- Damas clavus
- Dubiella fiscella belpa
- Ebrietas anacreon
- Ebrietas evanidus
- Elbella patrobas
- Elbella scylla
- Entheus matho matho
- Epargyreus aspina
- Epargyreus deleoni
- Epargyreus exadeus
- Epargyreus spina
- Epargyreus zestos
- Euphyes chamuli
- Euphyes peneia
- Gorgythion begga pyralina
- Gorgythion vox
- Grais stigmaticus
- Helias cama
- Helias phalaenoides
- Heliopetes alana
- Heliopetes arsalte
- Heliopetes ericetorum
- Heliopetes macaira
- Heliopetes nivella
- Hylephila phyleus
- Inglorius mediocris
- Jemadia pseudognetus
- Justinia phaetusa norda
- Lerema accius
- Lerema liris
- Lerodea arabus
- Lerodea eufala
- Lindra brasus brasus
- Melanopyge hoffmanni
- Methionopsis dolor
- Mictris crispus
- Milanion marciana
- Mnasicles geta
- Mnasitheus cephoides
- Mnasitheus nitra
- Moeris hyagnis hyagnis
- Monca crispinus
- Monca telata
- Morys lyde
- Morys micythus
- Morys valerius
- Mylon jason
- Mylon pelopidas
- Mylon salvia
- Myrinia myris
- Naevolus orius
- Narcosius parisi helen
- Nascus phocus
- Neoxeniades scipio luda
- Niconiades nikko
- Nisoniades godma
- Nisoniades rubescens
- Noctuana stator
- Onophas columbaria
- Orthos lycortas
- Ouleus fridericus panna
- Ouleus negrus
- Paches loxus zonula
- Pachyneuria licisca
- Panoquina evansi
- Panoquina hecebolus
- Panoquina lucas
- Panoquina ocola
- Panoquina pauper
- Papias dictys
- Parphorus decora
- Passova gellias
- Pellicia angra
- Pellicia arina
- Pellicia dimidiata dimidiata
- Perichares adela
- Perichares philetes
- Phanus marshalli
- Phanus vitreus
- Phlebodes campo sifax
- Phocides belus
- Phocides pigmalion
- Phocides polybius lilea
- Polites vibex
- Polyctor cleta
- Polyctor enops
- Polyctor polyctor polyctor
- Polygonus leo
- Polygonus manueli
- Polygonus savigny
- Polythrix asine
- Polythrix caunus
- Polythrix kanshul
- Polythrix metallescens
- Polythrix octomaculata
- Pompeius pompeius
- Porphyrogenes vulpecula
- Proteides mercurius
- Pyrgus adepta
- Pyrgus oileus
- Pyrrhopyge erythrosticta
- Pyrrhopyge zenodorus zenodorus
- Pythonides jovianus
- Quadrus cerialis
- Quadrus francesius
- Quadrus lugubris
- Quasimellana antipazina
- Quasimellana eulogius
- Quasimellana mexicana
- Quasimellana myron
- Remella remus
- Remella vopiscus
- Remella duena
- Repens florus
- Ridens allyni
- Saliana longirostris
- Saliana triangularis
- Sostrata bifasciata
- Sostrata nordica
- Spathilepia clonius
- Staphylus azteca
- Staphylus ceos
- Staphylus mazans
- Staphylus vulgatus
- Synapte pecta
- Telemiades avitus
- Telemiades choricus
- Thracides phidon
- Thracides thrasea
- Timochares ruptifasciata
- Timochares trifasciata
- Tosta gorgus
- Tromba xanthura
- Typhedanus ampyx
- Typhedanus salas
- Urbanus albimargo
- Urbanus belli
- Urbanus dorantes dorantes
- Urbanus doryssus
- Urbanus esmeraldus
- Urbanus esta
- Urbanus procne
- Urbanus pronta
- Urbanus proteus
- Urbanus simplicius
- Urbanus tanna
- Urbanus teleus
- Vacerra gayra
- Vehilius illudens
- Vehilius stictomenes
- Vettius fantasos
- Vettius onaca
- Wallengrenia otho
- Xenophanes tryxus
- Zariaspes mys
- Zera tetrastigma tetrastigma
- Zonia zonia panamensis

== See also ==
- Fauna of Belize
