= Lycoras =

Lycoras may refer to:

- Lycoris, a Greek word meaning "twilight", or relating to Lyco (wolf).
- Lycorus, a son of Apollo
- Ligoras (or Kurtdağı), "Wolf Mountain" in Çaykara district of Trabzon
- Lycoris (plant) a genus of flowers.
- Napeogenes lycora, a type of butterfly
- Liquorice, root of Glycyrrhiza glabra
