= Elbella lamprus =

Scientific classification
- Kingdom: Animalia
- Phylum: Arthropoda
- Class: Insecta
- Order: Lepidoptera
- Family: Hesperiidae
- Genus: Elbella
- Species: E. lamprus

Binomial name
- Elbella lamprus (Hopffer, 1874)

Synonyms
- Pyrrhopyge lamprus Hopffer, 1874; Pyrrhopyga menecrates Mabille, 1878; Pyrrhopyge margimmiscus Hayward, 1935

Species of butterfly

Elbella lamprus is a species of skipper butterfly in the genus Elbella. It is found in most of South America.

== Subspecies ==
- Elbella lamprus lamprus (Paraguay, Brazil, Argentina: Misiones)
- Elbella lamprus albociliata Mielke, 1995 (Brazil: Santa Catarina)
