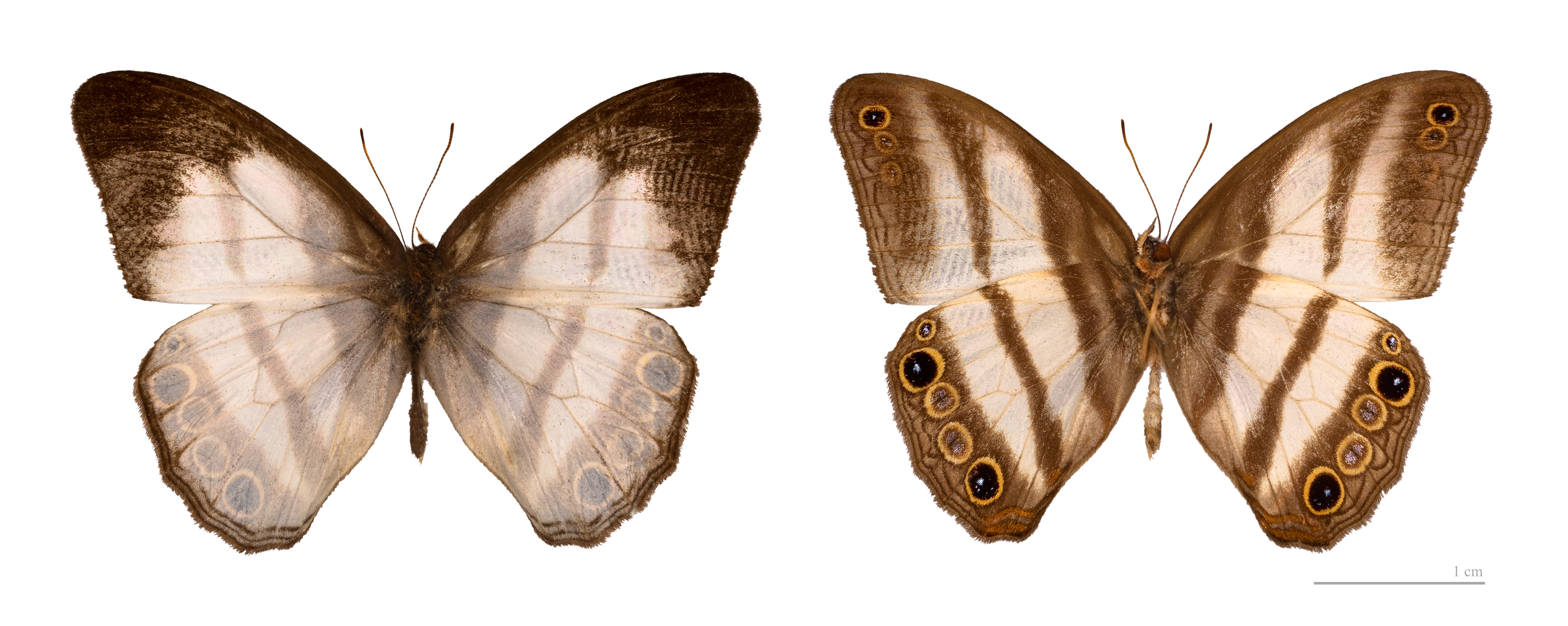

Scientific classification
- Kingdom: Animalia
- Phylum: Arthropoda
- Clade: Pancrustacea
- Class: Insecta
- Order: Lepidoptera
- Family: Nymphalidae
- Genus: Pareuptychia
- Species: P. hesionides

Binomial name
- Pareuptychia hesionides Forster, 1964

Synonyms
- Cissia hesionides; Pareuptychia boehmleri Anken, 1999

= Pareuptychia hesionides =

Species of butterfly

Pareuptychia hesionides, the hesionides satyr, is a species of butterfly of the family Nymphalidae. It is found in South America.

== Subspecies ==
- Pareuptychia hesionides hesionides (Bolivia, Brazil: Minas Gerais)
- Pareuptychia hesionides deviae Brévignon, 2005 (French Guiana)
