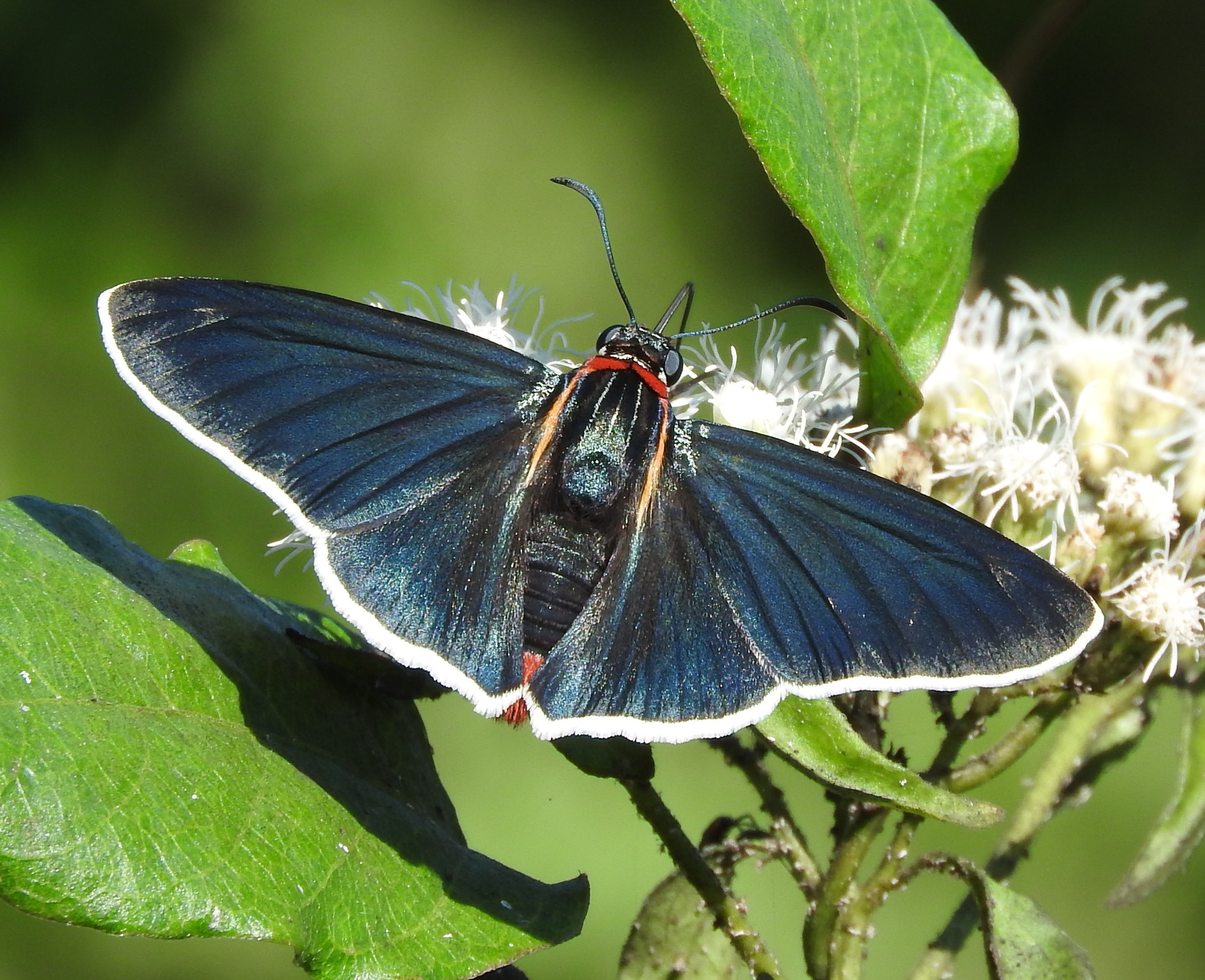
- Elbella scylla
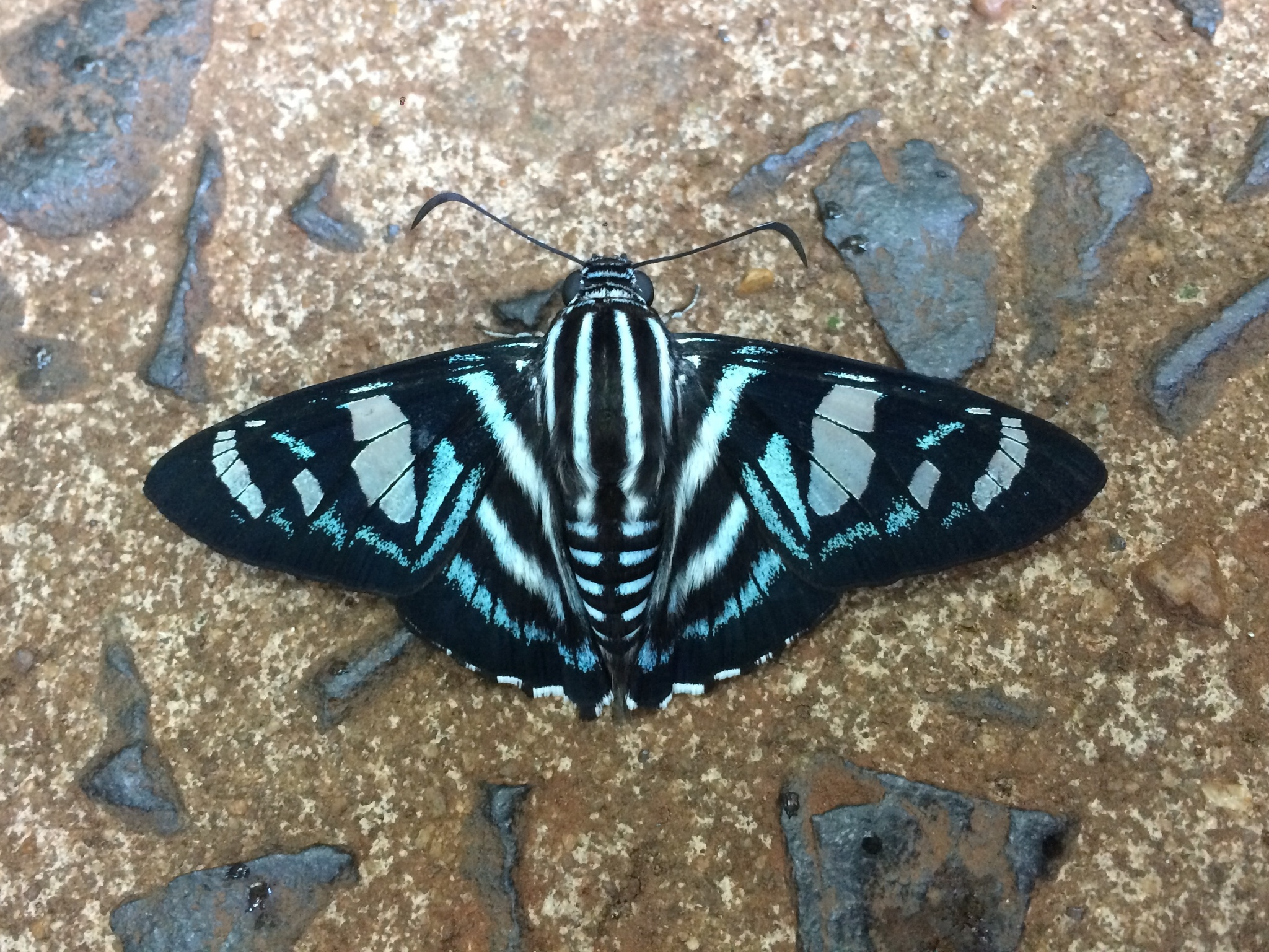
- Elbella azeta

Scientific classification
- Kingdom: Animalia
- Phylum: Arthropoda
- Class: Insecta
- Order: Lepidoptera
- Family: Hesperiidae
- Genus: Elbella

= Elbella =

Genus of butterflies

Elbella is a Neotropical genus of firetips in the family Hesperiidae.

== Species ==
- Elbella adonis (Bell, 1931) Argentina, Paraguay, Brazil
- Elbella azeta (Hewitson, [1866]) Guatemala, Panama, Peru, Brazil
- Elbella biscuspis de Jong, 1983 Suriname
- Elbella blanda Evans, 1951) Peru
- Elbella dulcinea (Plötz, 1879) Colombia
- Elbella etna Evans, 1951 Bolivia, Argentina, Peru, Brazil
- Elbella hegesippe (Mabille & Boullet, 1908)
- Elbella intersecta (Herrich-Schäffer, 1869) Venezuela, Brazil, Peru
- Elbella iphinous (Latreille, [1924]) Brazil
- Elbella lamprus (Hopffer, 1874) Argentina, Paraguay, Brazil
- Elbella lustra Evans, 1951 Colombia
- Elbella luteizona (Mabille, 1877) Brazil
- Elbella madeira Mielke, 1995 Brazil
- Elbella mariae (Bell, 1931) Brazil
- Elbella merops (Bell, 1934) Colombia
- Elbella miodesmiata (Röber, 1925) Mexico, Colombia
- Elbella patrobas (Hewitson, 1857) Mexico, Panama, Colombia, Peru, Brazil
- Elbella patroclus (Plötz, 1879) Colombia, Bolivia, Ecuador, Argentina, Peru
- Elbella rondonia Mielke, 1995 Brazil
- Elbella scylla (Ménétriés, 1855) Mexico, Colombia, Bolivia, Peru
- Elbella theseus (Bell, 1934) Brazil
- Elbella viriditas (Skinner, 1920) Bolivia, Paraguay, Brazil
