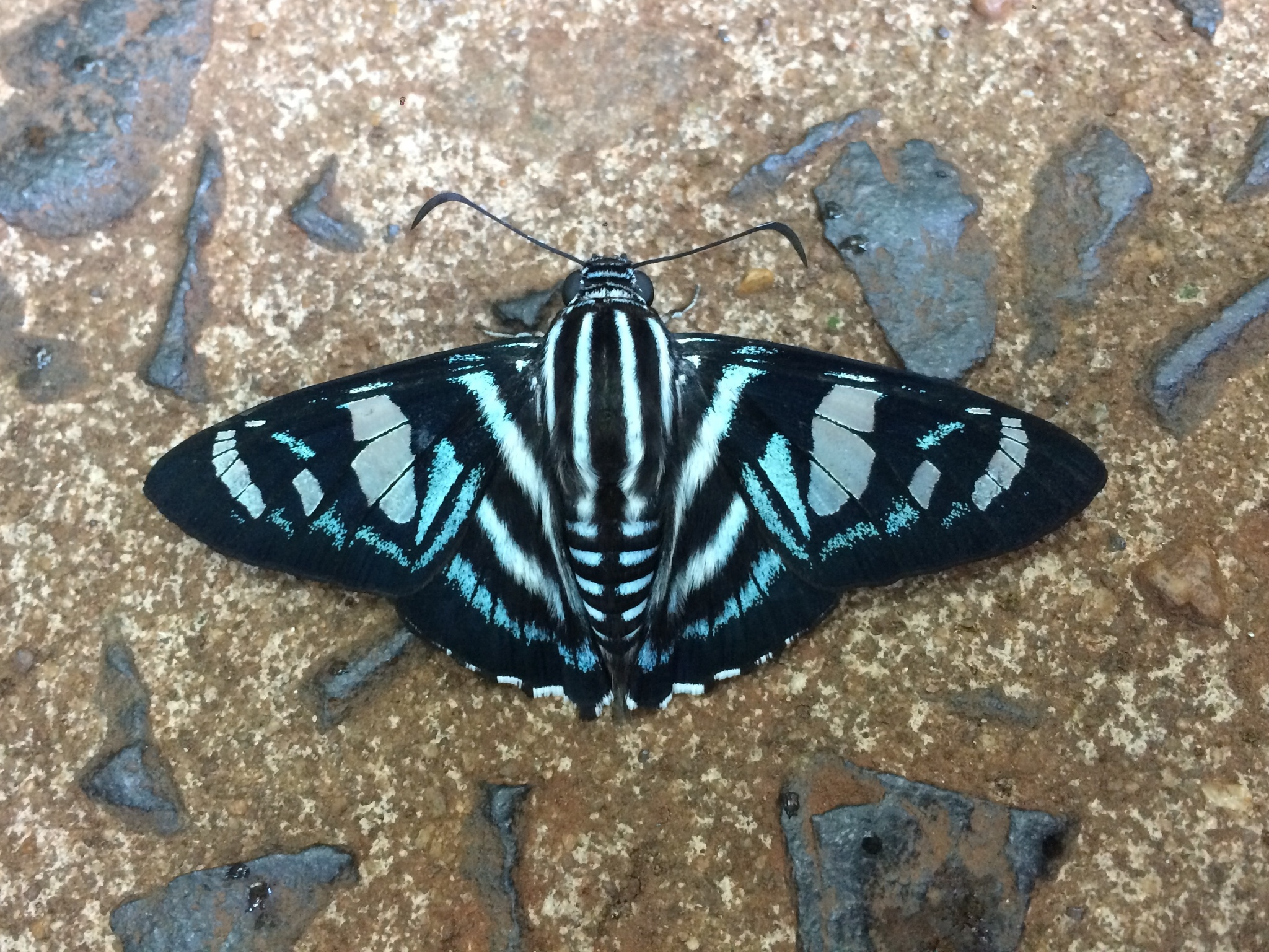

Scientific classification
- Kingdom: Animalia
- Phylum: Arthropoda
- Class: Insecta
- Order: Lepidoptera
- Family: Hesperiidae
- Genus: Elbella
- Species: E. azeta

Binomial name
- Elbella azeta (Hewitson, 1866)

Synonyms
- Pyrrhopyga azeta Hewitson, 1866; Jemadia azeta Godman & Salvin, 1893

= Elbella azeta =

Azeta skipper

Species of butterfly

Elbella azeta, known as the Azeta skipper, Azeta firetip, or Phodides skipper, is a species of skipper butterfly in the genus Elbella. It is found in most of South America.

== Subspecies ==
- Elbella azeta azeta (Paraguay, Brazil, Argentina)
- Elbella azeta giffordi Mielke, 1995 (Brazil: Distrito Federal)
