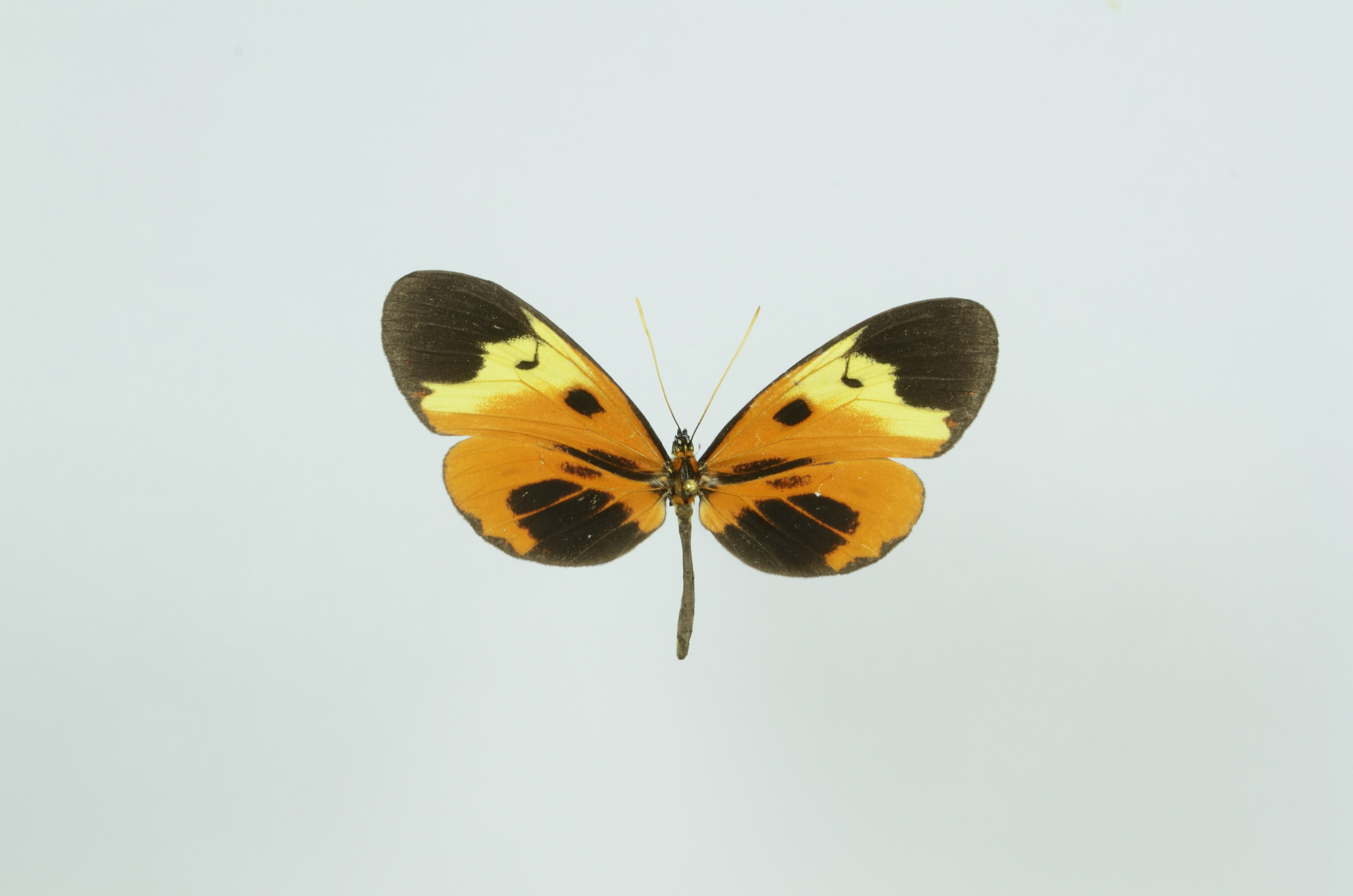
- Dorsal view
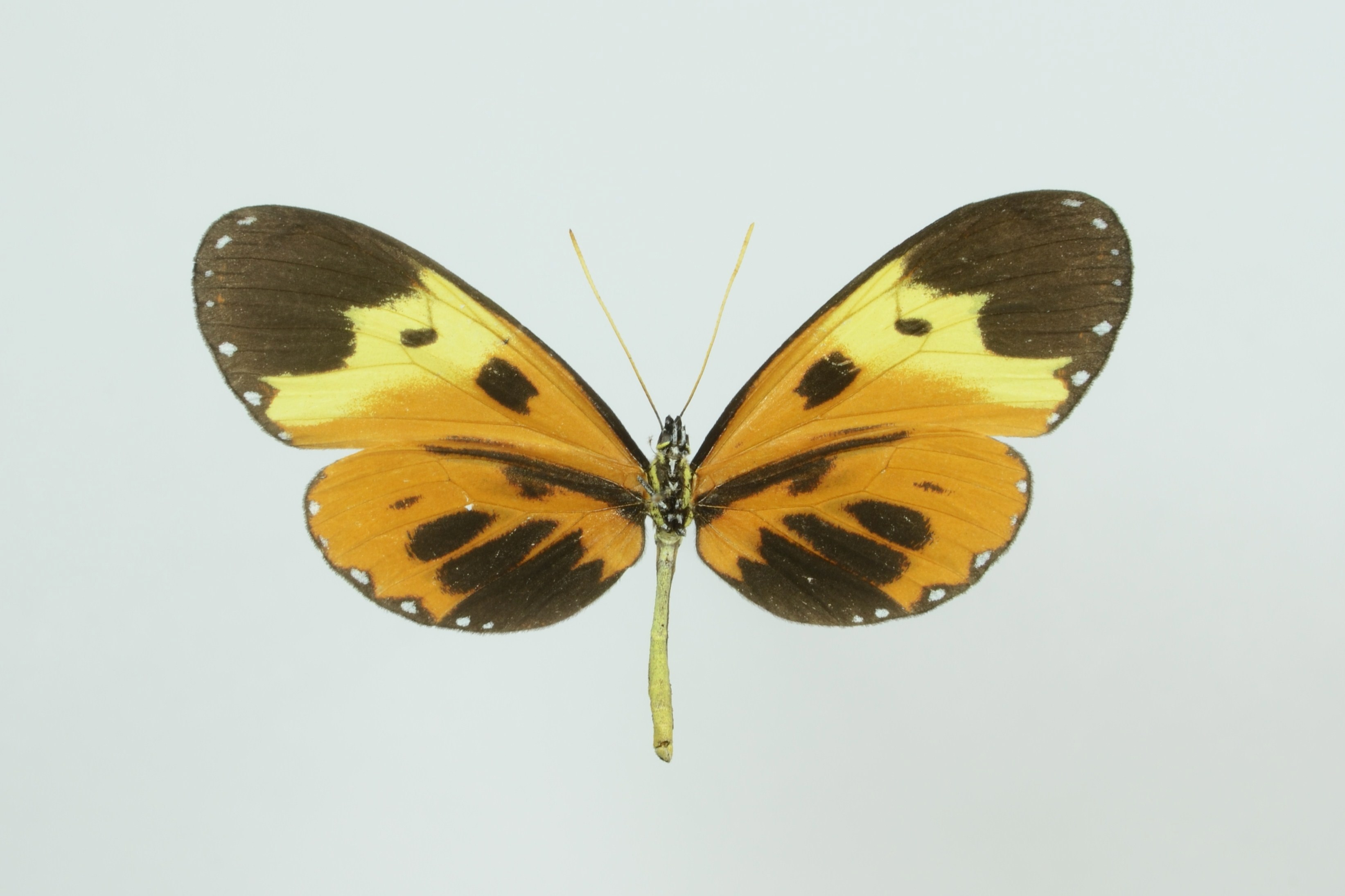
- Ventral view

Scientific classification
- Domain: Eukaryota
- Kingdom: Animalia
- Phylum: Arthropoda
- Class: Insecta
- Order: Lepidoptera
- Family: Nymphalidae
- Genus: Napeogenes
- Species: N. quadrilis

Binomial name
- Napeogenes quadrilis Haensch, 1903

Synonyms
- Napeogenes zurippa apobsoleta Kaye, 1918; Napeogenes larina quadrilis

= Napeogenes quadrilis =

Species of butterfly

Napeogenes quadrilis is a species of butterfly of the family Nymphalidae. It is found in Ecuador.
