= Fauna of Belize =

Native animals of Belize

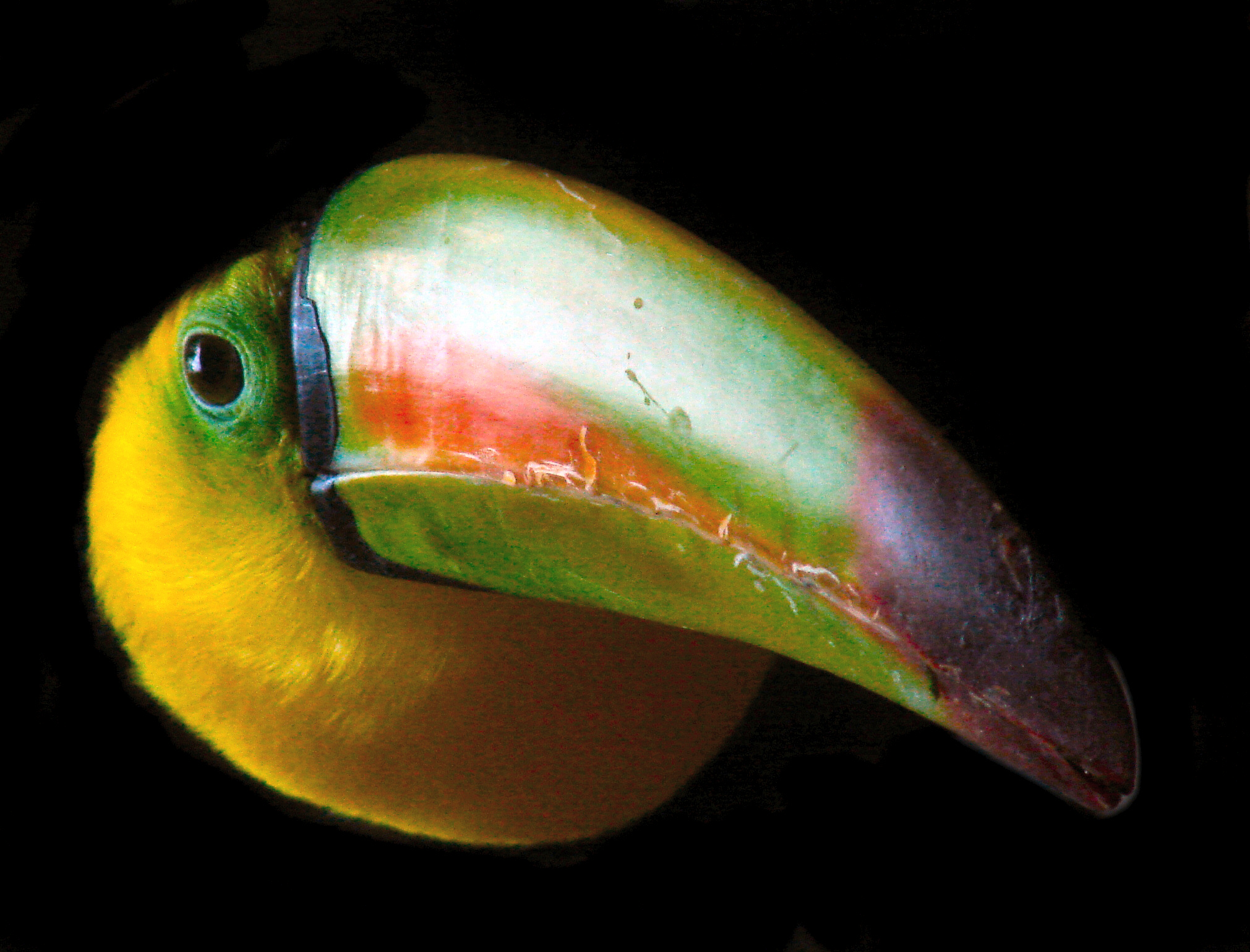
The keel-billed toucan is native to Belize.

Belize is a country with a rich variety of wildlife, due to its unique position between North and South America, and a wide range of climates and habitats for plant and animal life. Belize's low human population, and approximately 8,867 square miles (22,970 km^{2}) of undistributed land, provides an ideal home for more than 5000 species of plants, and vast numbers of animal species — with several hundred vertebrates including armadillos, snakes, and monkeys.

== Non-vertebrates ==
The vast majority of Belizean animals are from diverse lineages that are 'non-vertebrates', with many arthropods, molluscs, annelida, nematodes and often countless others often poorly studied.

== Vertebrates ==
=== Birds ===
The avifauna of Belize include a total of 590 species, of which two are globally endangered and four have been introduced by humans.

=== Amphibians ===
There are many species of salamanders, toads, and frogs found in the tropical forests of Belize such as the rufescent salamander, red-eyed tree frog, Maya rain frog, marine toad, and Mexican burrowing toad. Out of 450 species of salamanders found in the world, only six types are found in Belize, all of which belong to the family Plethodontidae. This group of salamanders are the lungless salamanders, meaning they do not breathe through lungs, but instead through the pores of their moist skin. There are three species of toads living in Belize, out of more than 300. The largest known toad can be found in Belize, the marine toad. It can grow up to 20 cm (8 in), and weight as much as 1.2 kg (2.5 lb.). These toads are more commonly found in human settlements rather than in the wild, so they are easily seen by tourists. They have adapted to human settlements, so they will eat cat or dog food left out for pets.

There are more than 800 species of rain frogs that exist, and eight of them are found in Belize. They vary in size, from the Maya rain frog, which is about 2.5–3.5 cm (1–1.4 in) cm (1 in), to the Central American rain frog which can be 9 cm (3.5 in) long. Rain frogs are usually terrestrial, so they can be found on the forest floors, in or near pools, ponds, and streams. They are different from tree frogs in their color; usually having more earth tones with dark markings on their backs and legs. Out of more than 700 species of tree frogs, 12 of them can be found in Belize. Unlike rain frogs, they have more bright colors such as orange, blue, red and yellow to warn predators that they are poisonous. Tree frogs, like their name, are most commonly found in trees. Despite their skinny legs, they are very good jumpers and climbers.

=== Reptiles ===
In Belize, there are 2 species of crocodilians that roam around the waters, the American crocodile and Morelet's crocodile. Although both of these species are not particularly aggressive, they are found as a danger to humans. The American crocodile can grow up to 6.4 m (21 ft), on average being about 4 m (13 ft). They are usually found in the swamps and lowlands of Belize. Morelet's crocodile, which is smaller, can grow up to 4 m (13 ft) but the average size is 2.5 m (8 ft). These crocodiles are mostly seen along the coast of Northern and Central Belize in freshwater.

Belize has many species and types of turtles. There are three species of hard-shelled sea turtles such as the loggerhead, which on average is 2.3 m (7.5 ft) long and 540 kg (1190 lb.). They are found in the open oceans and coastal waters of Belize. Another is the green sea turtle which on average is 1.5 m (5 ft) and can weigh up to 100 kg (220 lb.). Green sea turtles migrate across open seas but are primarily found in shallow coastal waters. The third type of hard-shelled sea turtle that can be found in Belize is the hawksbill turtle. This sea turtle is only about 1 m (3.3 ft) and does not exceed 50 kg (110 lb.), and they are usually found near coral reefs or rocky areas of the sea. Five species of mud and musk turtles are found in the fresh water bodies of Belize: narrow-bridged musk turtles, Tabasco mud turtles, white-lipped mud turtles, scorpion mud turtles, and Mexican giant musk turtles. Two of the species of turtles that live primarily on land in Belize are the furrowed wood turtle and the slider turtle. Some other species of turtles commonly found in Belize are Central American river turtles which live in fresh water and their average size is about 65 cm (25 in), and snapping turtles which can tolerate any type of body of water, and on average are about 47 cm (18 in).

Belize is home to many tropical snake species, including both venomous and nonvenomous snakes. The families found in Belize consist of Colubridae, Boidae, Elapidae and Viperidae, of which the latter two families are highly venomous and may present a potential health hazard to humans if provoked. Out of 1500 species of colubrids known, 60 of these species live in the tropical habitats of Belize. Many of the colubrid species found in Belize are often Neotropical forms of the Neartic colubrids found in Mexico, the United States, and Canada, with some of the species of colubrid snakes consisting of the water snakes, brown snakes, garter snakes, whip snakes, green snakes, rat snakes, and king snakes.

Colubrid snakes differ from other Belize snakes in a few ways. Colubrids typically do not have a definable jaw line, and often have heads that are not much thicker than the neck, if at all. In addition, they have several rows of teeth on the roof of their mouth, as well as single row of teeth on the bottom jaw, but they do not have elongated, hollow fangs in the upper jaw as some of the venomous snakes often do. The only species in the family Boidae that is found in Belize is the boa constrictor, which includes a separate locality form (potentially a separate subspecies) from Crawl Cay. A dwarf form, Belizean boa constrictors can reach up to a maximum length of 7 ft (2.1 m) but typically only reach a length of 2.5–4 ft (0.76–1.22 m). Their patterns typically consists of brown or black squarish markings on a grey or brown background that become progressively rounder, larger, and darker towards the tail, and this pattern helps them to camouflage in their surroundings, often in leaf litter, bushes, and tree canopies, to remain hidden from both prey and predators.

Boa constrictors and many of the colubrid species kill their prey primarily via constriction, grabbing their prey within their jaws before throwing coils of their muscular bodies around the prey item and squeezing a great amount of pressure, killing their prey by asphyxiation and ruptured blood capillaries. Boa constrictors are ambush hunters, while colubrids will vary between being either active hunters or ambush hunters.

The venomous snakes in Belize can be split into two families: the Viperidae, and the Elapidae. The Viperidae of Belize contains pit vipers such as rattlesnakes, lanceheads, and the cantils. Most of the venomous snakes in Belize are in this family. Some of the specific species found in Belize are the fer-de-lance, (Bothrops asper) which can grow up to 2.5 m (8 ft) in length, the eyelash viper (Bothriechis shlegelii), which can grow up to 1 m (3 ft), and the Neotropical rattlesnake (Crotalus durissus), which can reach a length of 1.5 m (5 ft).

Both pit vipers (which are venomous) and boa constrictors (which are not) are usually ambush hunters that will remain hidden, laying in wait in a single general area, potentially up for several days, before striking a prey item that crosses their path with immense speed. There are only 3 species of the family Elapidae that are found in Belize, all of which are classified as different species of coral snakes. Coral snakes are often found in bright vivid patterns which represent a warning to potential predators or aggravators, also of which are known to be mimicked by the colubrid milk snakes as a form of Batesian mimicry. Coral snakes from Belize are typically small, rarely ever grow longer than 1 m (3 ft). However, their venom is known to be a very powerful neurotoxin.

There are eight species of geckos that inhabit Belize. They are very small, harmless lizards, that can climb walls due to their big toes and claws that allow them to cling easily. This is why they are often found in homes of people in Belize, hanging on the walls. They are usually a length of 5–10 cm (2–4 in), not including the tail. The size of the tail can vary dramatically because of the gecko's ability to detach it and grow another. There is one species of gecko that can only be found in Belize, which is the Belize leaf-toed gecko. The world's smallest reptile, the Caribbean dwarf gecko, which on average is 4 cm (1.5 in) long, has also made its home in Belize.

== See also ==
- List of endemic species of Belize
- List of butterflies of Belize
