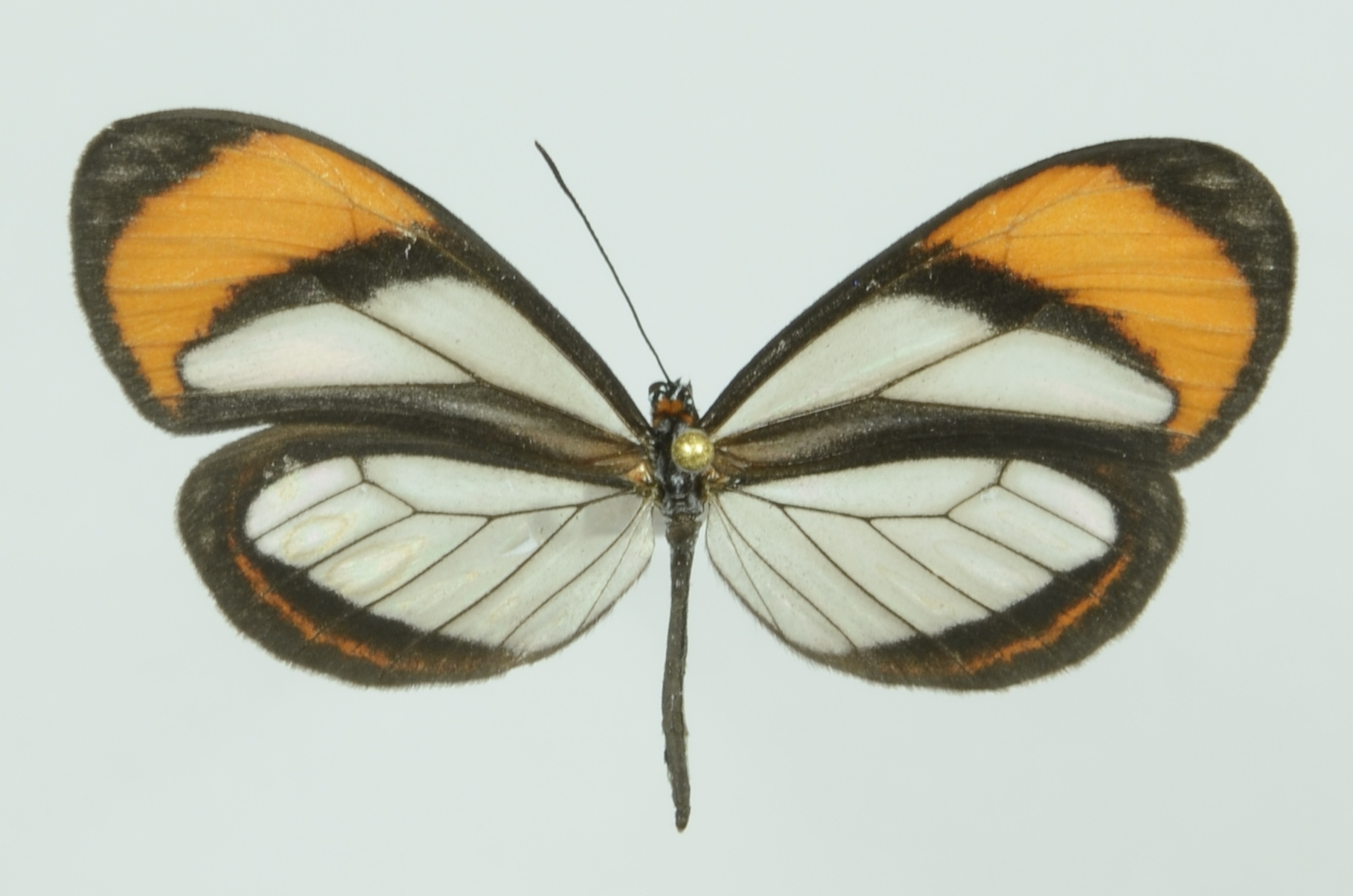

Scientific classification
- Domain: Eukaryota
- Kingdom: Animalia
- Phylum: Arthropoda
- Class: Insecta
- Order: Lepidoptera
- Family: Nymphalidae
- Genus: Napeogenes
- Species: N. sylphis

Binomial name
- Napeogenes sylphis (Guérin-Méneville, [1844])

Synonyms
- Heliconia sylphis Guérin-Méneville, [1844]; Ithomia ithra Hewitson, 1855; Ithomia ercilla Hewitson, 1858; Ithomia corena Hewitson, 1861; Napeogenes corena caucayaensis Fox & Real, 1971; Ithomia thira Hewitson, 1874; Napeogenes potaronus Kaye, 1905

= Napeogenes sylphis =

Species of butterfly

Napeogenes sylphis is a species of butterfly of the family Nymphalidae. It is found in South America.

The larvae of subspecies N. s. acreana have been recorded feeding on Lycianthes species.

== Subspecies ==
- N. s. sylphis (Bolivia and Peru)
- N. s. acreana d'Almeida, 1958 (Brazil)
- N. s. caucayensis Fox & Real, 1971 (Colombia)
- N. s. corena (Hewitson, 1861) (Ecuador, Colombia, Brazil and Peru)
- N. s. ercilla (Hewitson, 1858) (Brazil)
- N. s. ehu Brevignon, 2007 (French Guiana)
- N. s. ithra (Hewitson, 1855) (Brazil)
- N. s. potaronus Kaye, 1905 (Guyana)
- N. s. rindgei Fox & Real, 1971 (Peru)
- N. s. thira (Hewitson, 1874) (Bolivia and Peru)
