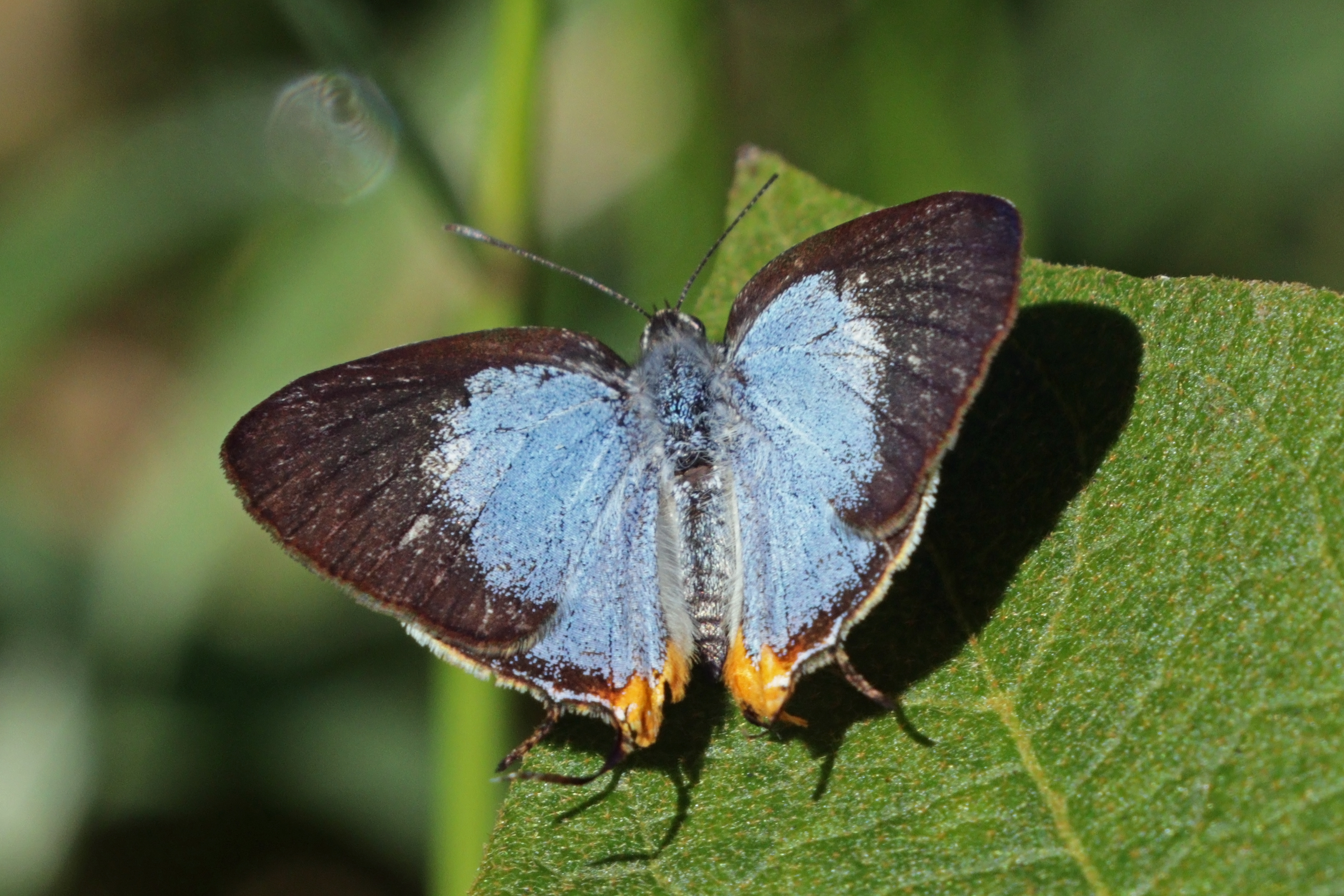

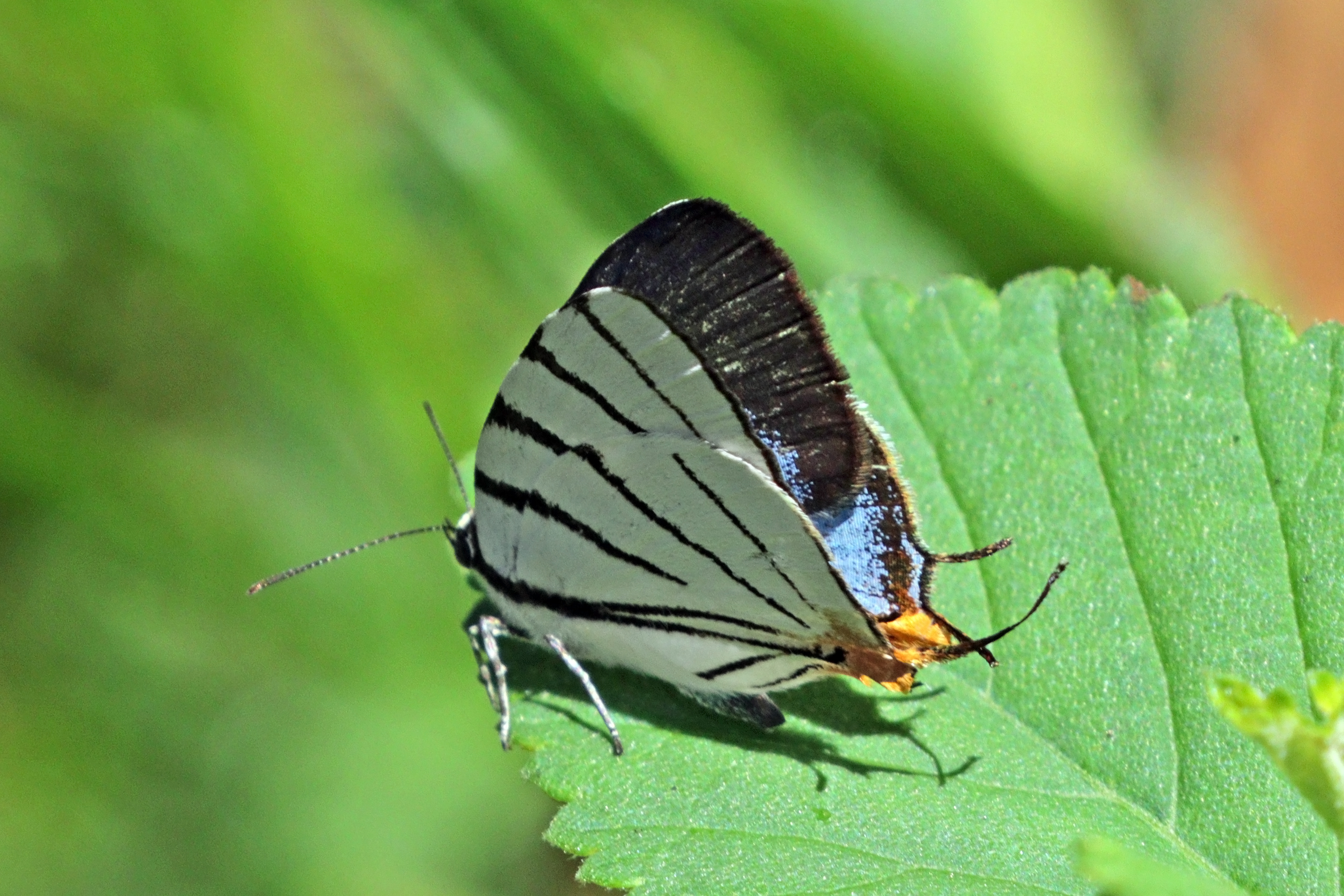
- Fine-lined stripe-streak (A. sito) in Panama

Scientific classification
- Kingdom: Animalia
- Phylum: Arthropoda
- Clade: Pancrustacea
- Class: Insecta
- Order: Lepidoptera
- Family: Lycaenidae
- Tribe: Eumaeini
- Genus: Arawacus; Kaye, 1904

Synonyms
- Polyniphes Kaye, 1904; Dolymorpha Holland, 1931; Tigrinota Johnson, 1992

= Arawacus =

Stripestreaks

Butterfly genus in family Lycaenidae

Arawacus is a genus of butterflies in the family Lycaenidae. They are commonly called stripestreaks. The species of this genus are found in the Neotropical realm.

Species include (17 species are recognized by Butterflies of America):

- Arawacus aethesa (Hewitson, 1867) Brazil (Bahia)
- Arawacus aetolus (Sulzer, 1776) Colombia, Venezuela, Trinidad, Bolivia, Suriname
- Arawacus binangula (Schaus, 1902) Brazil (Paraná)
- Arawacus dolylas (Cramer, [1777]) Surinam, Venezuela, Colombia, Bolivia
- Arawacus dumenilii (Godart, [1824]) Venezuela, Trinidad
- Arawacus ellida (Hewitson, 1867) Venezuela, Paraguay, Colombia, Peru, Argentina, Brazil (Rio de Janeiro)
- Arawacus euptychia (Draudt, 1920) Brazil
- Arawacus hypocrita (Schaus, 1913) Costa Rica, Mexico
- Arawacus jada (Hewitson, 1867) North America – creamy stripe-streak, nightshade hairstreak
- Arawacus leucogyna (C. & R.Felder, 1865) Costa Rica, Panama, Venezuela, Colombia
- Arawacus lincoides (Draudt, 1917) Colombia
- Arawacus meliboeus (Fabricius, 1793) Brazil
- Arawacus separata (Lathy, 1926) Peru, Paraguay
- Arawacus sito (Boisduval, 1836) Mexico, south to Central America – fine-lined stripe-streak
- Arawacus tadita (Hewitson, 1877) Brazil (Paraná)
- Arawacus tarania (Hewitson, 1868) Brazil (Paraná, Minas Gerais)
- Arawacus togarna (Hewitson, 1867) Mexico, Bolivia
