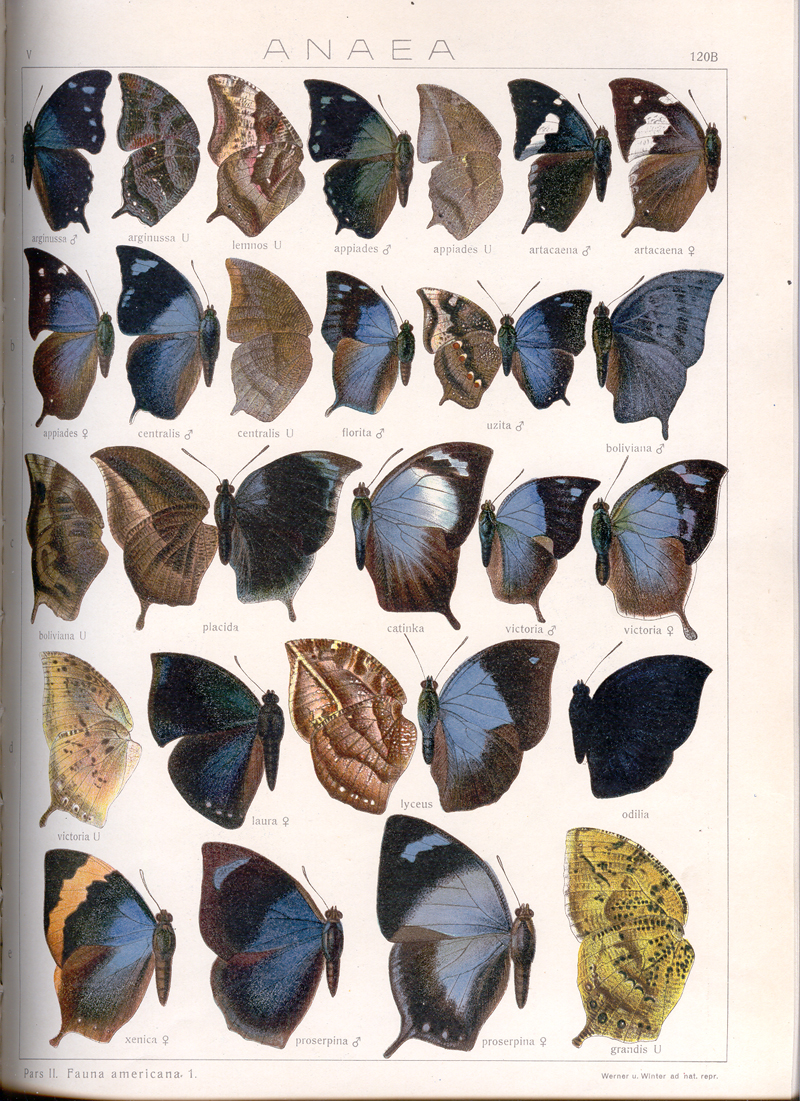

Scientific classification
- Kingdom: Animalia
- Phylum: Arthropoda
- Class: Insecta
- Order: Lepidoptera
- Family: Nymphalidae
- Genus: Memphis
- Species: M. lemnos

Binomial name
- Memphis lemnos (Druce, 1877)

= Memphis lemnos =

Species of butterfly

Memphis lemnos is a species of leafwing found in South America (Ecuador and Peru).

Memphis lemnos is a butterfly with a wingspan of about 58 mm, with forewings with a humped costal edge, concave outer edge and inner edge as well. Each hindwing bears a tail. The upper part is navy blue with a metallic blue basal part and on the forewings a submarginal line of metallic blue spots. The underside is brown mottled with grey and green and simulates a dead leaf. It differs from Memphis pithyusa having above similar markings by the deviating under surface which is much more variegated with reddish and white embeddings in the middle especially of the hindwings. The ground of the wings is beneath also lighter, so that the dark bands are more sharply contrasting. Above the whole proximal half of the wings is of a bright blue lustre, the blue distal spots are very large. The inner-marginal excision at the forewing very slight.Seitz - differs from the species having above similar markings by the deviating under surface which is much more variegated with reddish and white embeddings in the middle especially of the hindwings. The ground of the wings is beneath also lighter, so that the dark bands are more sharply contrasting. Above the whole proximal half of the wings is of a bright blue lustre, the blue distal spots are very large. The inner-marginal excision at the forewing very slight.
