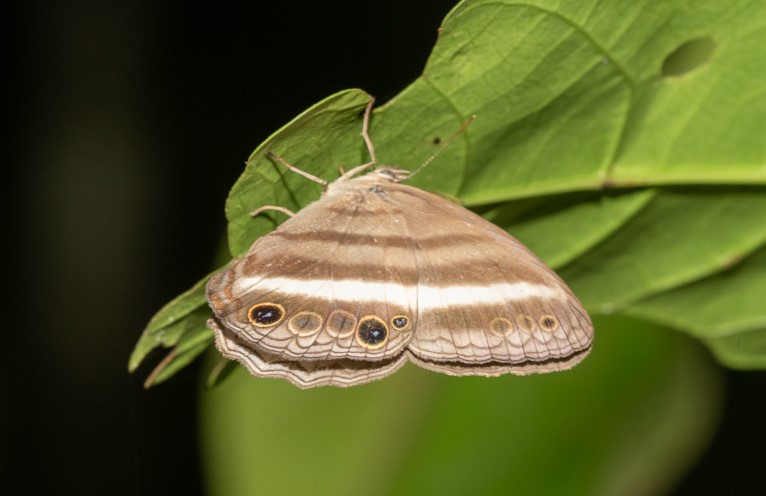
- Pareuptychia summandosa

Scientific classification
- Kingdom: Animalia
- Phylum: Arthropoda
- Class: Insecta
- Order: Lepidoptera
- Family: Nymphalidae
- Subfamily: Satyrinae
- Tribe: Satyrini
- Subtribe: Euptychiina
- Genus: Pareuptychia; Forster, 1964

Type species
- Papilio hesione Sulzer, 1776

= Pareuptychia =

Genus of insects

Pareuptychia is a genus of satyrid butterflies found in the Neotropical realm.

== Species ==
Listed alphabetically:

- Pareuptychia binocula (Butler, 1869)
- Pareuptychia difficilis Forster, 1964
- Pareuptychia hervei Brévignon, 2005
- Pareuptychia hesionides Forster, 1964
- Pareuptychia lydia (Cramer, 1777)
- Pareuptychia metaleuca (Boisduval, 1870)
- Pareuptychia ocirrhoe (Fabricius, 1776)
- Pareuptychia summandosa (Gosse, 1880)
