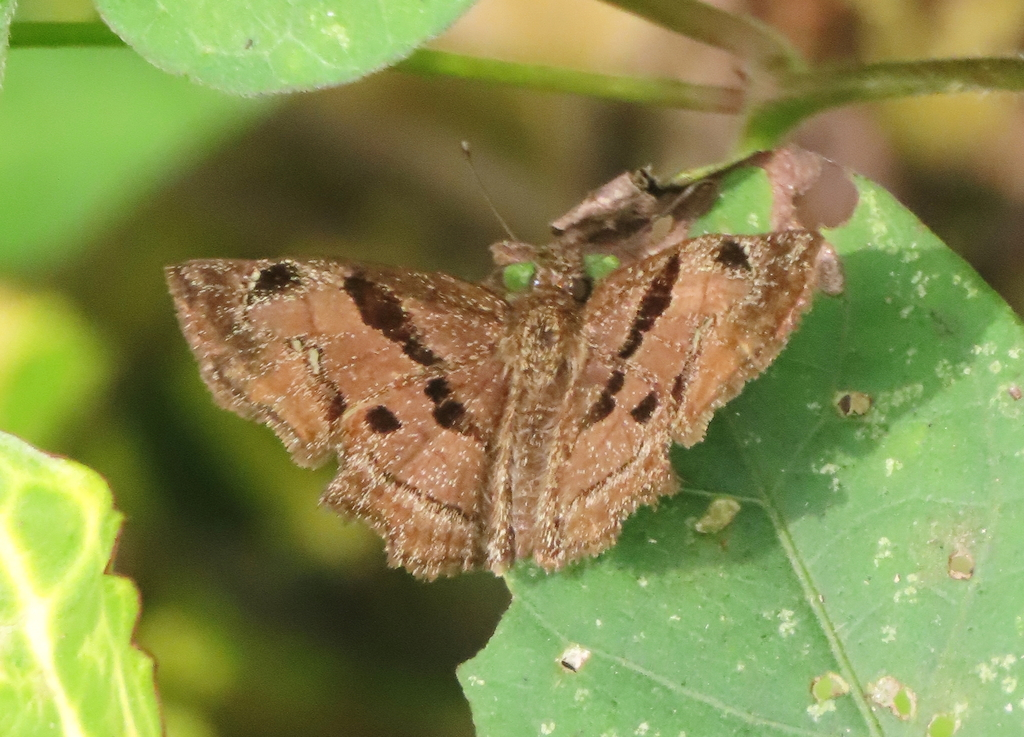

Scientific classification
- Kingdom: Animalia
- Phylum: Arthropoda
- Clade: Pancrustacea
- Class: Insecta
- Order: Lepidoptera
- Family: Hesperiidae
- Genus: Systaspes; Weeks, 1905
- Species: S. corrosus

Binomial name
- Systaspes corrosus (Mabille, 1878)

Synonyms
- Antigonus corrosus Mabille, 1878

= Systaspes =

Genus of butterflies

Systaspes is a genus of skippers in the family Hesperiidae. It is monotypic, being represented by the single species, Systaspes corrosus.
