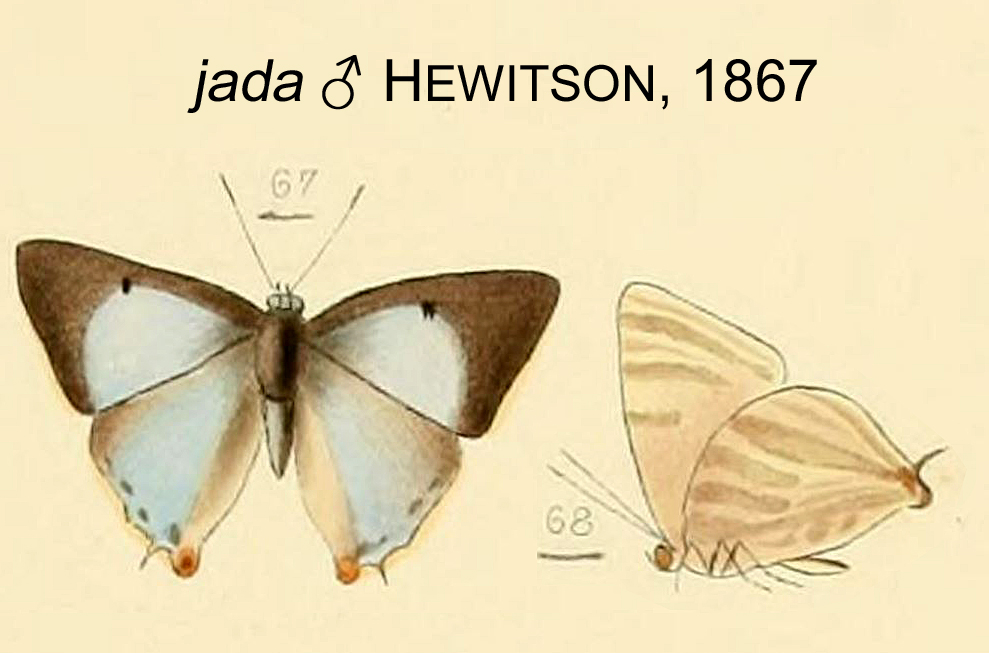

Scientific classification
- Kingdom: Animalia
- Phylum: Arthropoda
- Clade: Pancrustacea
- Class: Insecta
- Order: Lepidoptera
- Family: Lycaenidae
- Tribe: Eumaeini
- Genus: Arawacus
- Species: A. jada

Binomial name
- Arawacus jada (Hewitson, 1867)

= Arawacus jada =

Species of butterfly

Arawacus jada, commonly known as the creamy stripe-streak or nightshade hairstreak, is a species of hairstreak in the butterfly family Lycaenidae.
