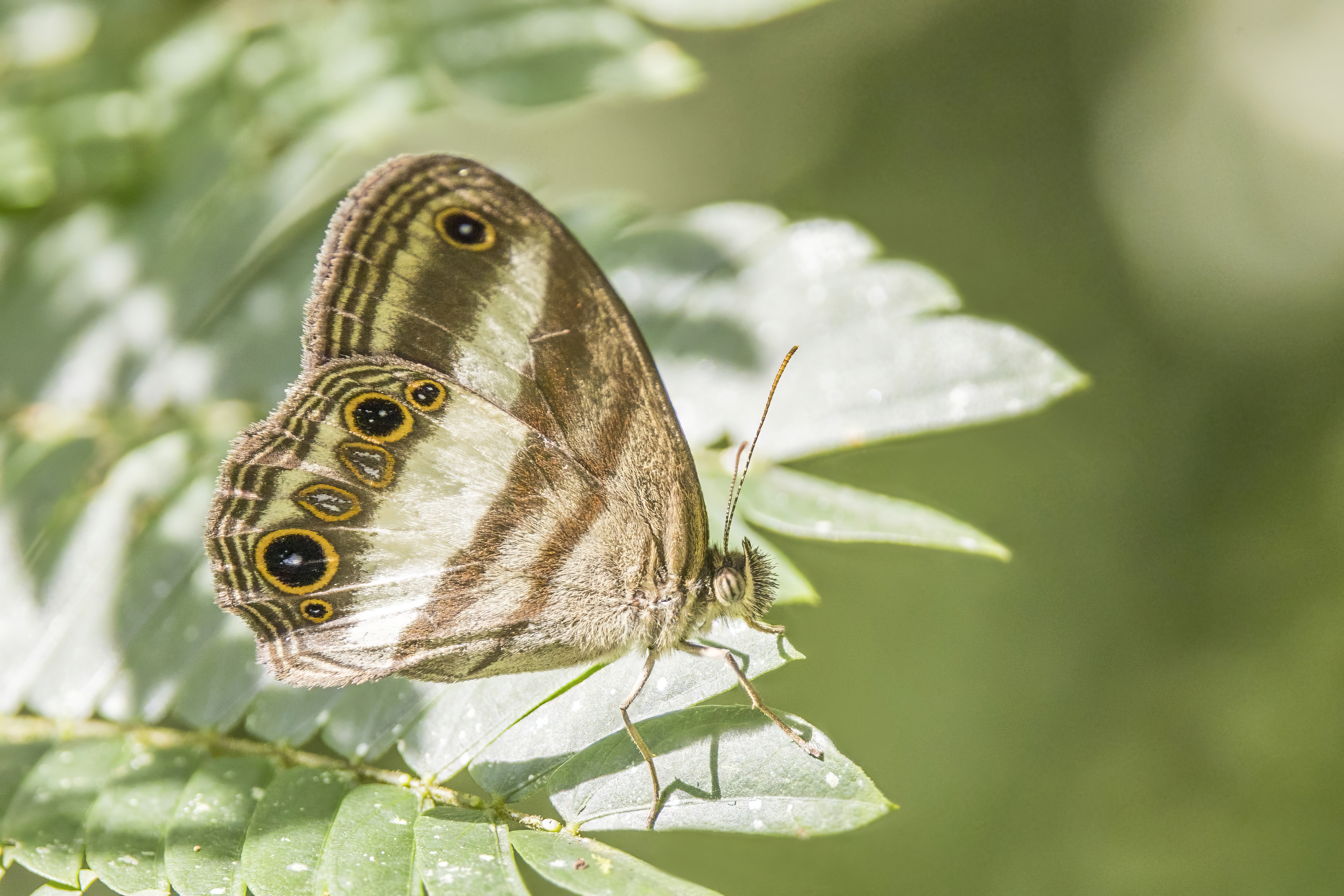
- in Ecuador

Scientific classification
- Kingdom: Animalia
- Phylum: Arthropoda
- Class: Insecta
- Order: Lepidoptera
- Family: Nymphalidae
- Genus: Pareuptychia
- Species: P. metaleuca

Binomial name
- Pareuptychia metaleuca (Boisduval, 1870)

Synonyms
- Neonympha metaleuca Boisduval, 1870; Euptychia butleri Distant, 1876

= Pareuptychia metaleuca =

Species of butterfly

Pareuptychia metaleuca, the one-banded satyr, is a species of butterfly of the family Nymphalidae. It is found from Mexico to Brazil.

== Subspecies ==
- Pareuptychia metaleuca metaleuca (Mexico, Guatemala, Costa Rica)
- Pareuptychia metaleuca tekolokem Brévignon, 2005 (French Guiana)
