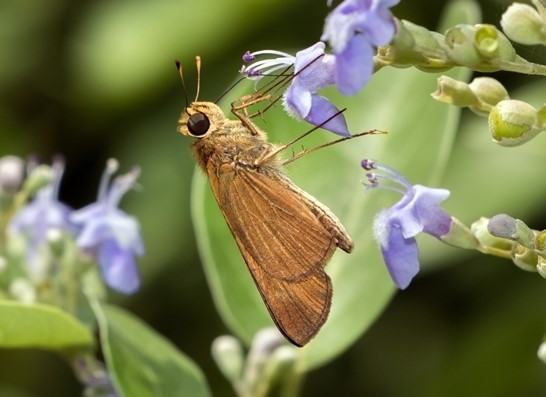

Scientific classification
- Kingdom: Animalia
- Phylum: Arthropoda
- Class: Insecta
- Order: Lepidoptera
- Family: Hesperiidae
- Genus: Panoquina
- Species: P. hecebolus

Binomial name
- Panoquina hecebolus (Scudder, 1872)

Synonyms
- Pamphila parilis Mabille, 1891

= Panoquina hecebolus =

Species of butterfly

Panoquina hecebolus, the hecebolus skipper, is a species of grass skipper in the butterfly family Hesperiidae. It is found in North America.

The MONA or Hodges number for Panoquina hecebolus is 4120.
