= Lycoris =

Lycoris is a Greek word which means "twilight". Other uses include:

- Lycoris (plant), a genus of family Amaryllidaceae
- Lycoris, a character of .hack the multimedia franchise
- Lycoris (company), a software company, acquired by Mandriva in 2005
- Lycoris Black, a character from the Harry Potter novels
- Lycoris Recoil, an anime television series produced by A-1 Pictures
- LyCORIS, a popular open-source library for fine-tuning Stable Diffusion image generation models
