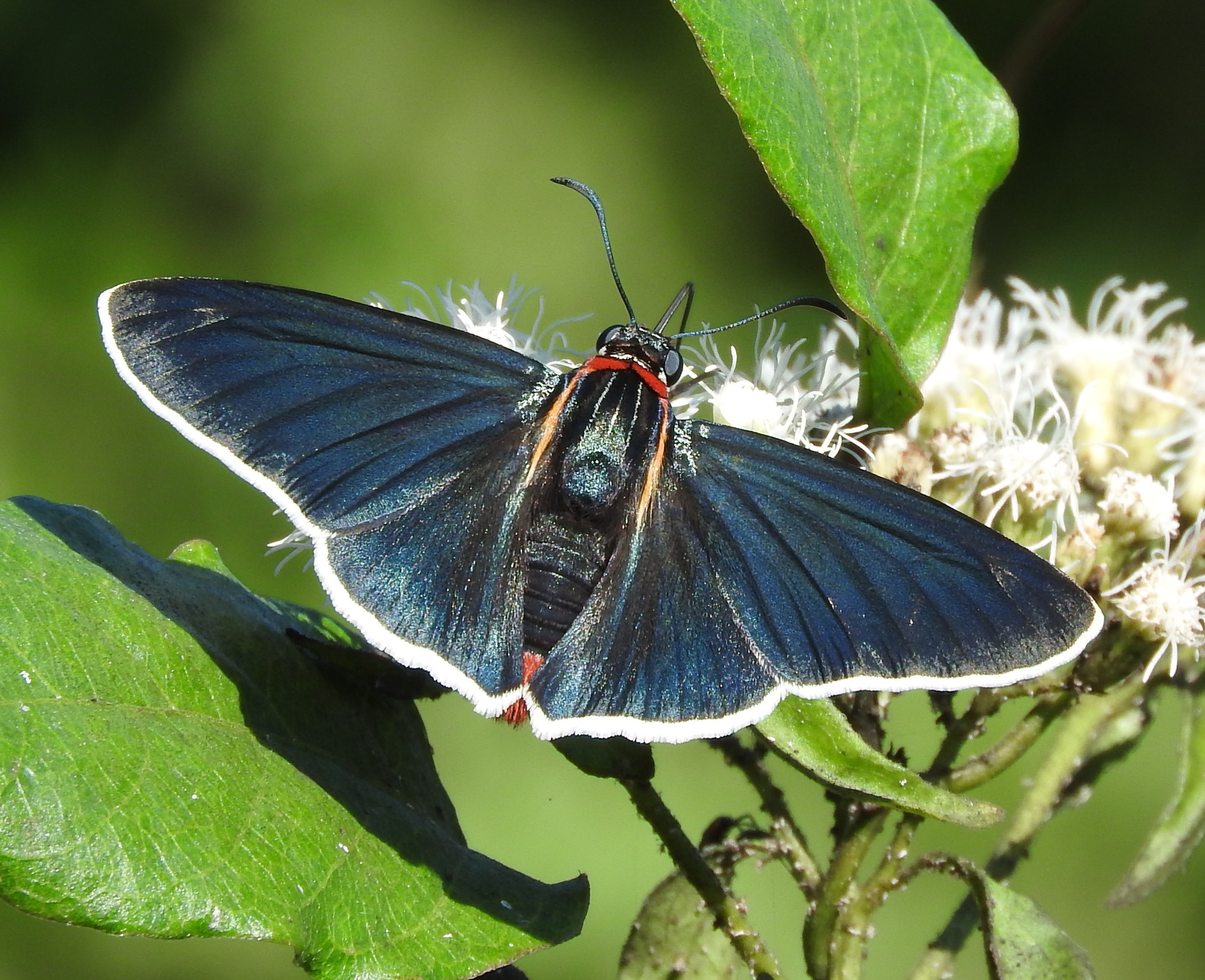

Scientific classification
- Kingdom: Animalia
- Phylum: Arthropoda
- Clade: Pancrustacea
- Class: Insecta
- Order: Lepidoptera
- Family: Hesperiidae
- Genus: Elbella
- Species: E. scylla

Binomial name
- Elbella scylla (Ménétriés, 1855)

Synonyms
- Pyrrhopyga scylla Ménétriés, 1855; Microceris scylla Watson, 1893

= Elbella scylla =

Scylla skipper

Species of butterfly

Elbella scylla, known as the Scylla skipper or Scylla firetip, is a species of skipper butterfly in the genus Elbella. It is found from Mexico to Costa Rica.
