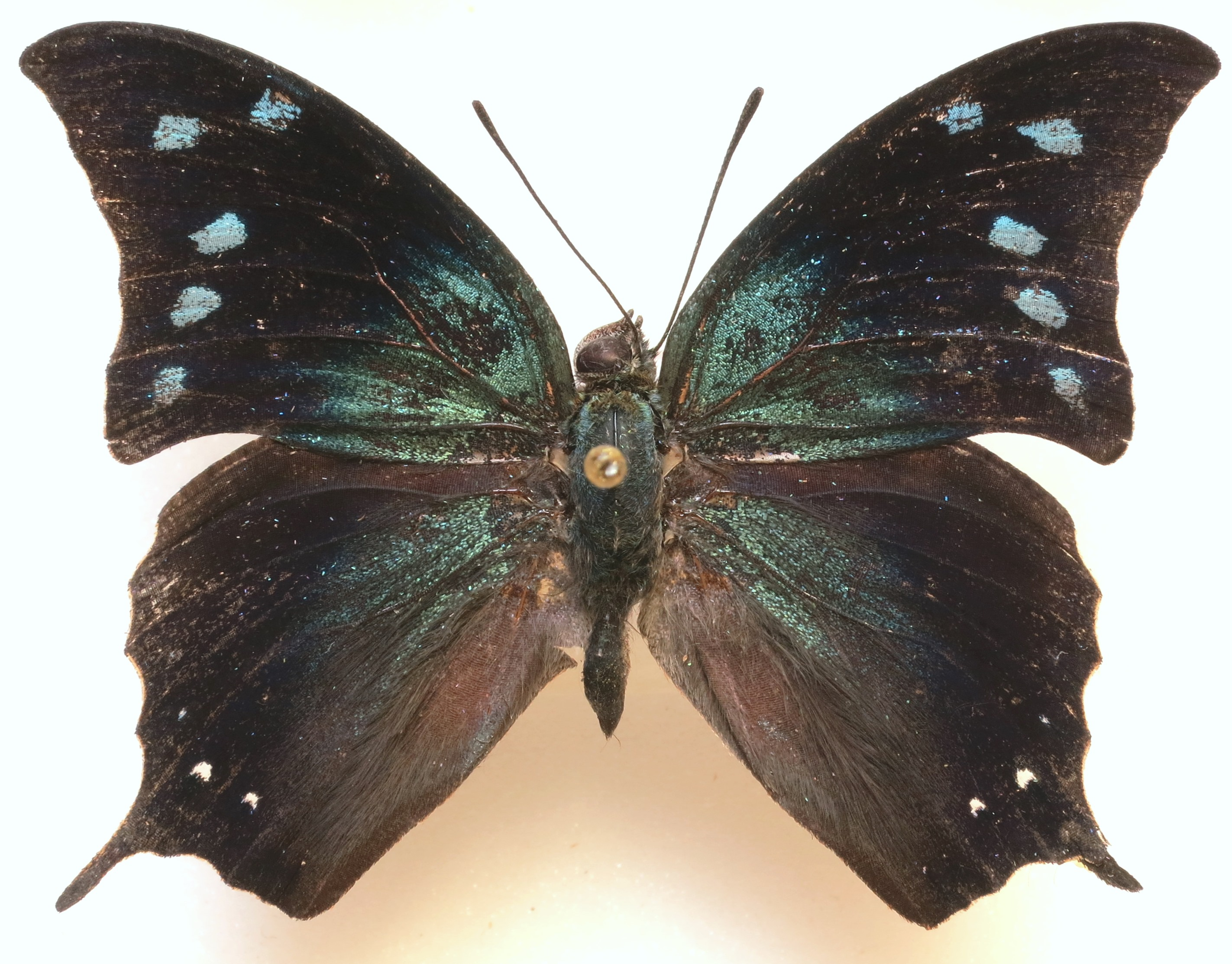

Scientific classification
- Kingdom: Animalia
- Phylum: Arthropoda
- Class: Insecta
- Order: Lepidoptera
- Family: Nymphalidae
- Tribe: Anaeini
- Genus: Memphis
- Species: M. pithyusa

Binomial name
- Memphis pithyusa (R. Felder, 1869)

= Memphis pithyusa =

Species of butterfly

Memphis pithyusa, known generally as the pale-spotted leafwing or blue leafwing, is a species of leafwing in the butterfly family Nymphalidae. It is found in southern North America. and South America. It is similar to Memphis lemnos. The MONA or Hodges number for Memphis pithyusa is 4556.

== Subspecies ==
- Memphis pithyusa pithyusa present in Mexico and Colombia
- Memphis pithyusa morena (Hall, 1935) present in French Guiana

== Description ==
Memphis pithyusa is a butterfly with a wingspan of 57 mm to 76 mm, with forewings with a concave outer edge and hindwings with a tail. The upper part is dark blue to brown, with a lighter basal part, blue or blue-green, and a submarginal line of light dots.The underside is light brown and simulates a dead leaf. It is the smallest form of this group. It differs from the similar species chiefly by the shape; distal margin and proximal margin of the forewings are much less deeply sinuous, so that the inner angle does not project so much; the apex of the forewings likewise decreases in intensity thereby. The female [not in errore] is, according to Druce, much larger than the female, the base of the wings is bluer and the spots on the forewings are larger and mostly white. In many places common.

== Biology ==
The dry season form flies from May to September, the wet season from November to March.

== Host plants ==
The host plants of its caterpillar are Crotons (Euphorbiaceae) including Croton reflexifolius and Croton lucidus

== Ecology and distribution ==
Memphis pithyusa is found in South Texas, Mexico, Costa Rica, Colombia, Bolivia, and Guyana.Biotope - Memphis pithyusa resides in the various types of forest.
