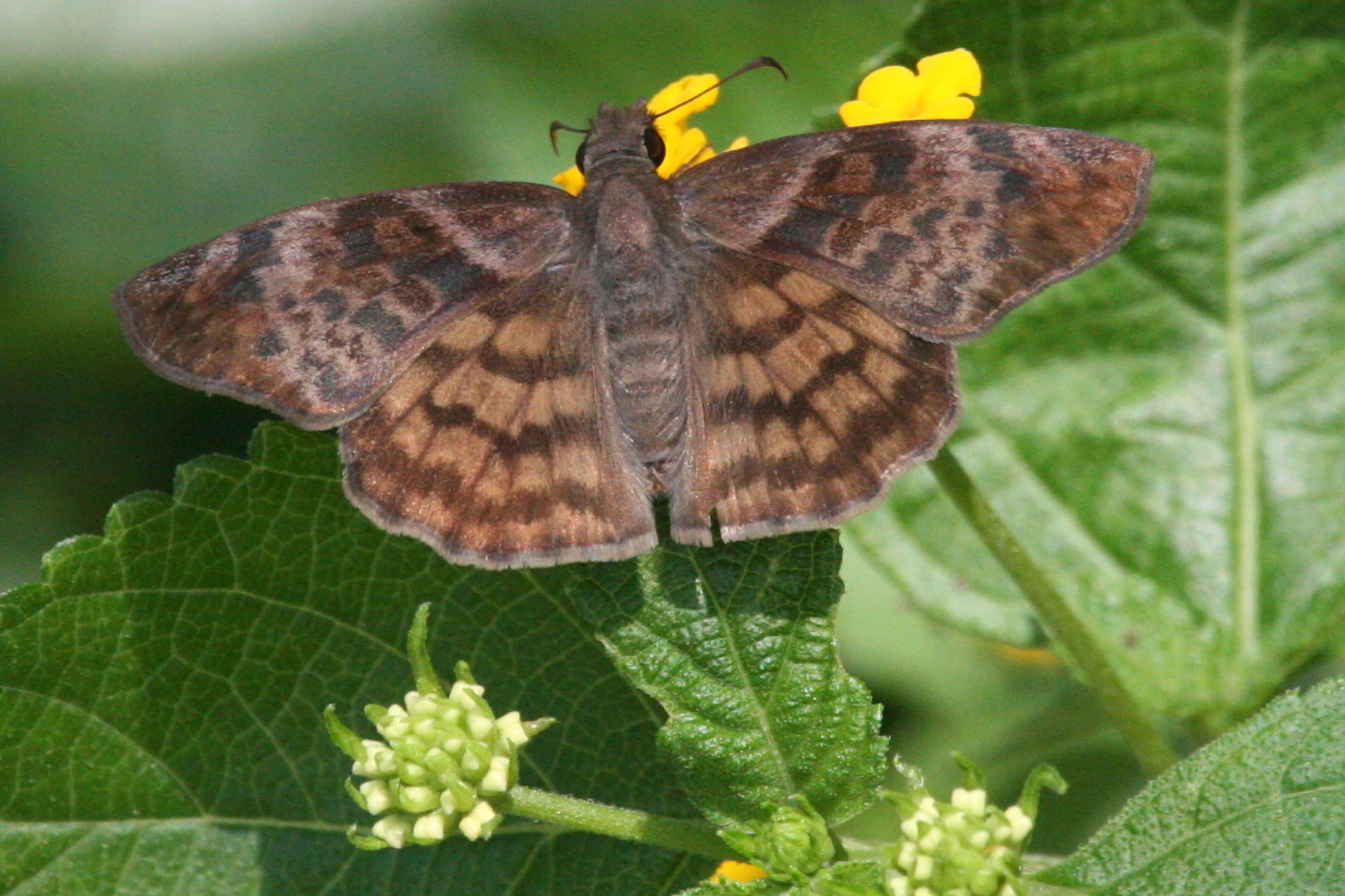

Scientific classification
- Kingdom: Animalia
- Phylum: Arthropoda
- Clade: Pancrustacea
- Class: Insecta
- Order: Lepidoptera
- Family: Hesperiidae
- Genus: Timochares
- Species: T. ruptifasciata

Binomial name
- Timochares ruptifasciata (Plötz, 1884)

= Timochares ruptifasciata =

Species of butterfly

Timochares ruptifasciata, the brown-banded skipper, is a species of spread-wing skipper in the butterfly family Hesperiidae. It is found in the Caribbean Sea, Central America, and North America.

== Subspecies ==
These two subspecies belong to the species Timochares ruptifasciata:

- Timochares ruptifasciata runia Evans, 1953
- Timochares ruptifasciata ruptifasciata
