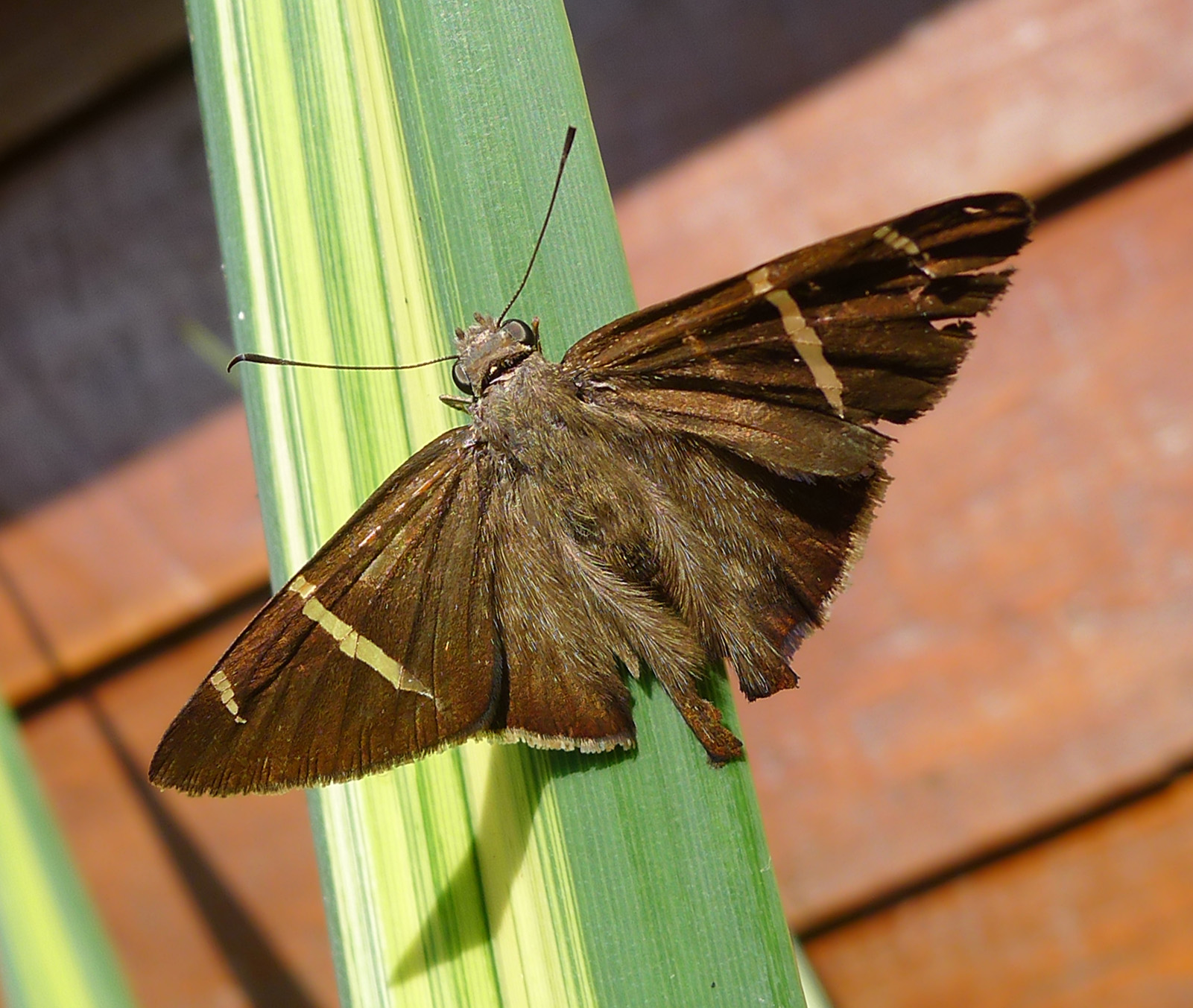

Scientific classification
- Kingdom: Animalia
- Phylum: Arthropoda
- Class: Insecta
- Order: Lepidoptera
- Family: Hesperiidae
- Genus: Spicauda
- Species: S. tanna

Binomial name
- Spicauda tanna (Evans, 1952)

Synonyms
- Teleus tanna (Evans, 1952); Urbanus tanna Evans, 1952

= Spicauda tanna =

Tanna longtail

Species of butterfly

Spicauda tanna, the Tanna longtail, is a species of butterfly in the family Hesperiidae. It is found from Ecuador and French Guiana, north through Central America to Mexico. Rare strays can be found up to the lower Rio Grande Valley in Texas.

The wingspan is 33–38 mm. Adults are on wing from June to December in Mexico and in June in southern Texas.

The larval host is unknown. Adults probably feed on flower nectar.
