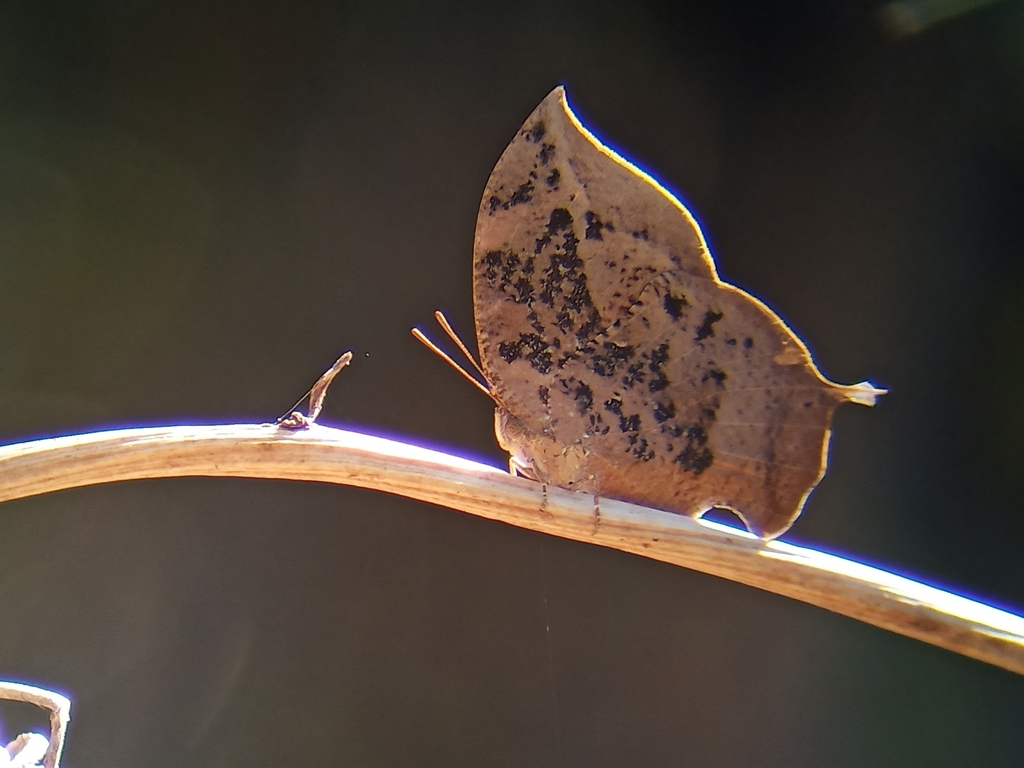

Scientific classification
- Kingdom: Animalia
- Phylum: Arthropoda
- Clade: Pancrustacea
- Class: Insecta
- Order: Lepidoptera
- Family: Nymphalidae
- Tribe: Anaeini
- Genus: Memphis
- Species: M. forreri

Binomial name
- Memphis forreri (Godman & Salvin, [1884])

= Memphis forreri =

Species of butterfly

Memphis forreri is a species of leafwing found in South America (Mexico, Costa Rica, and Guatemala).

== Description ==
Memphis forreri is a fore-winged butterfly with a humped costal edge, a concave outer edge, a hook-like inner angle, and a concave inner edge. The upper part is violet blue or brown with purple reflections, with a lighter basal part and a metallic blue submarginal band on the forewings. The reverse side is brown with metallic reflections and simulates a dead leaf.

Seitz: "Wings bluish-black; forewing at the basal area of a bright blue and with a blue subapical band from the costal margin as far as nearly to the border, as well as two confluent blue spots near the anal angle. Forewings very pointed, hindwings without tails. Beneath of a pale brown, irrorated with brown and grey, and especially in the anal angle of the forewings thus marbled, the forewings with a rusty-reddish hue in the discal area. Female like the male, but the hindwing with a spatulate tail."

== Biology ==
The host plant of its caterpillar is Ocotea verguensis.

== Etymology ==
Named in honour of Alphonse Forrer (1836–1899), an English-born collector of zoological specimens in Mexico for the British Museum.
