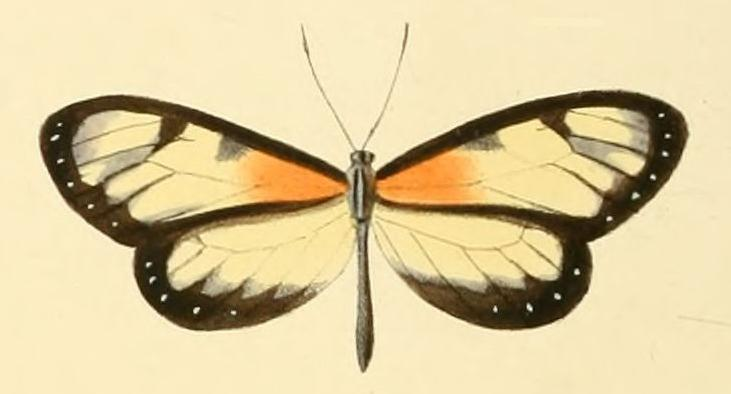

Scientific classification
- Domain: Eukaryota
- Kingdom: Animalia
- Phylum: Arthropoda
- Class: Insecta
- Order: Lepidoptera
- Family: Nymphalidae
- Genus: Napeogenes
- Species: N. tolosa

Binomial name
- Napeogenes tolosa (Hewitson, 1855)

Synonyms
- Ithomia tolosa Hewitson, 1855; Ithomia chrispina Hewitson, 1874; Napeogenes amara Godman, 1899; Napeogenes diaphanosa Kaye, 1918; Napeogenes pacifica Krüger, 1925

= Napeogenes tolosa =

Species of butterfly

Napeogenes tolosa, the Tolosa tigerwing, is a species of butterfly of the family Nymphalidae. It is found from Mexico to northern South America.

The larvae feed on Solanum and Lycianthes species.

== Subspecies ==
- Napeogenes tolosa tolosa (Mexico)
- Napeogenes tolosa amara Godman, 1899 (Nicaragua, Costa Rica, Panama)
- Napeogenes tolosa chrispina (Hewitson, 1874) (Ecuador, Colombia)
- Napeogenes tolosa diaphanosa Kaye, 1918 (Colombia)
- Napeogenes tolosa mombachoensis Brabant & Maes, 1997 (Nicaragua)

There are two undescribed subspecies from Panama.
