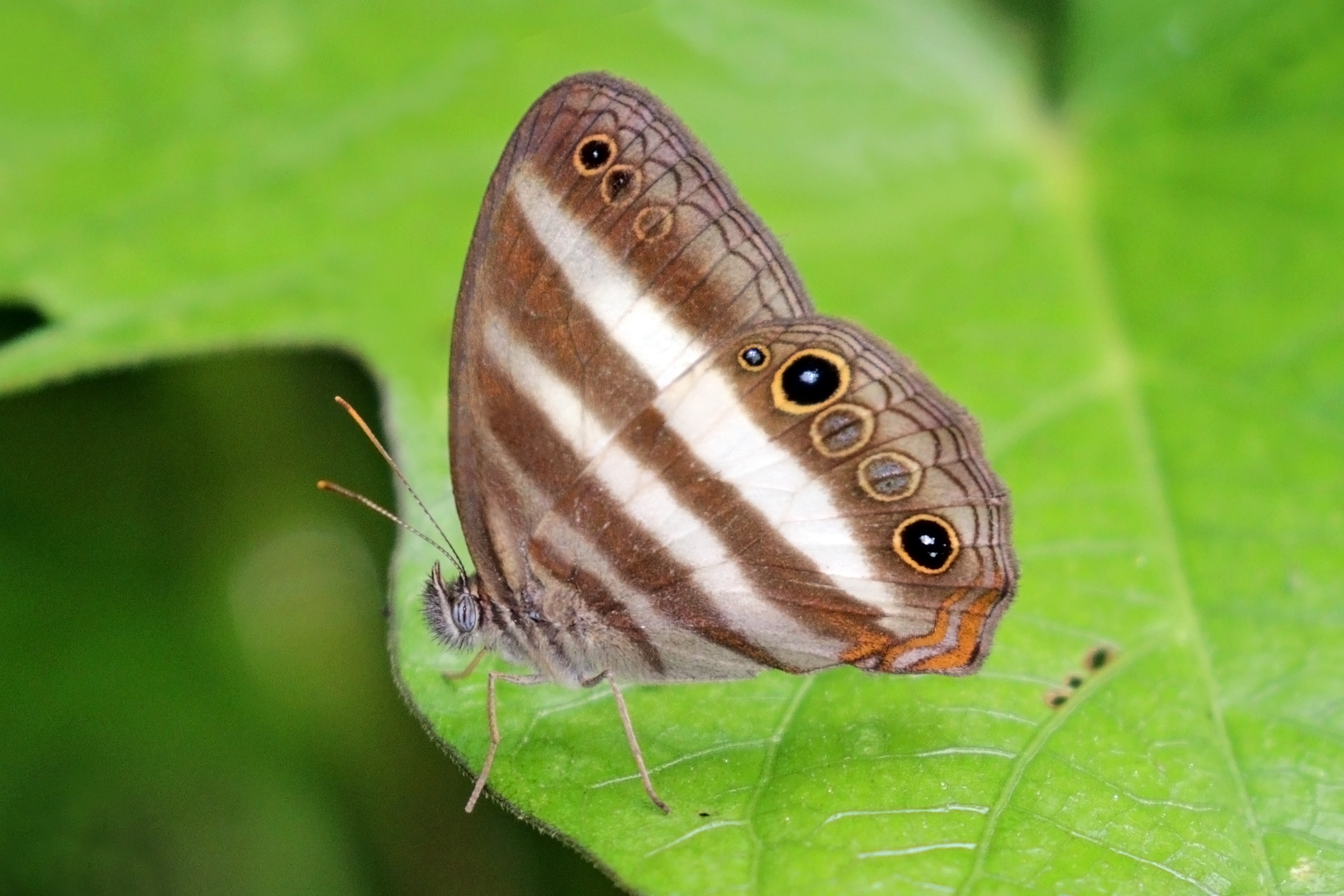
- in Panama
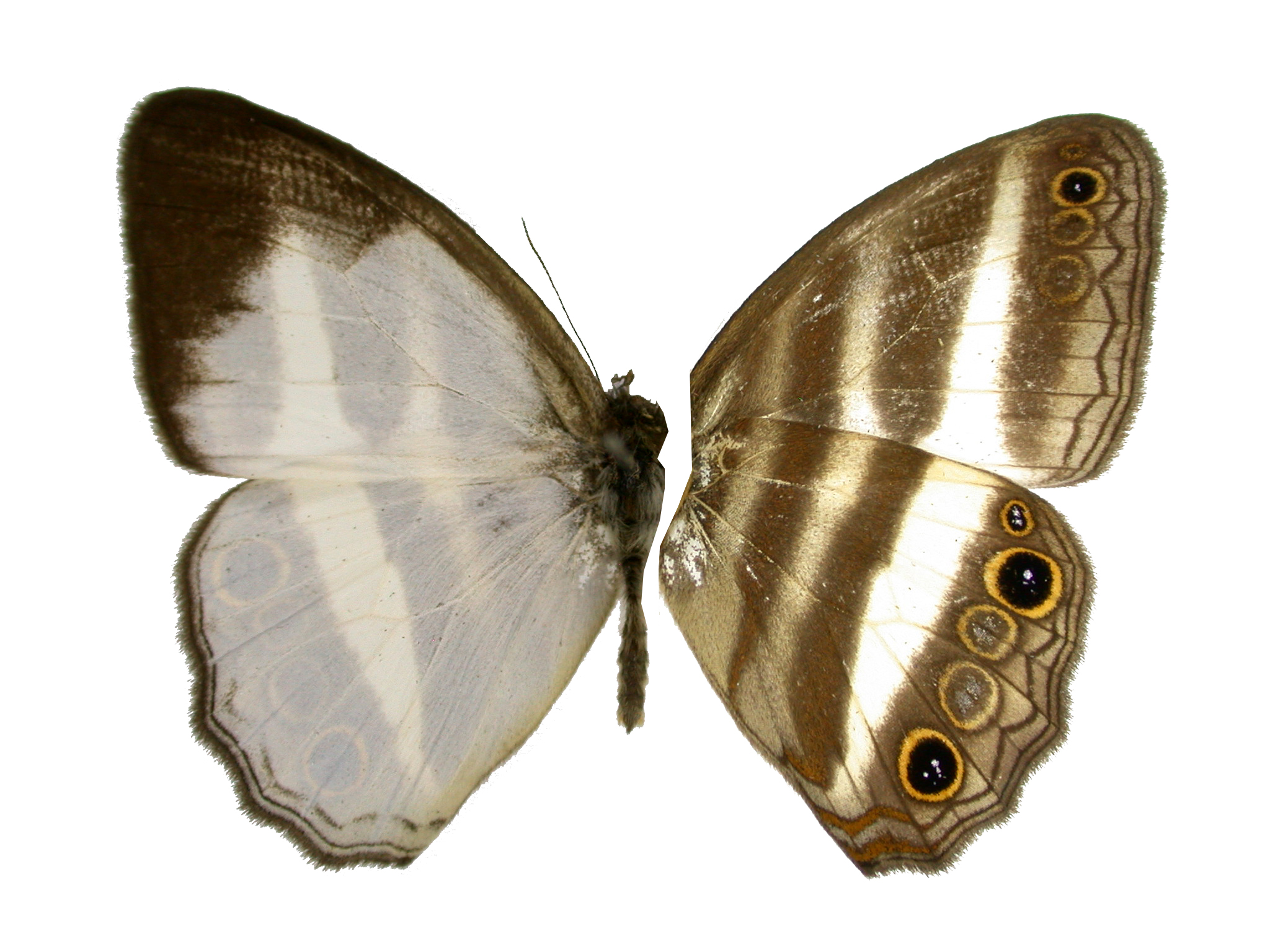

Scientific classification
- Kingdom: Animalia
- Phylum: Arthropoda
- Class: Insecta
- Order: Lepidoptera
- Family: Nymphalidae
- Genus: Pareuptychia
- Species: P. ocirrhoe

Binomial name
- Pareuptychia ocirrhoe (Fabricius, 1776)

Synonyms
- Papilio ocirrhoe Fabricius, 1776; Euptychia ocirrhoe; Euptychia ocirrhoe interjecta d'Almeida, 1952; Euptychia hesione hesione f. emarginata Bryk, 1953; Pareuptychia bivari Anken, 1994

= Pareuptychia ocirrhoe =

Species of butterfly

Pareuptychia ocirrhoe, the two-banded satyr or banded white ringlet, is a species of butterfly of the family Nymphalidae. It is found from Mexico to the Guyanas, Paraguay and northern Argentina. The habitat consists of forests.

The wingspan is about 37 mm.

The larvae feed on Eleusine species.

== Subspecies ==
- Pareuptychia ocirrhoe ocirrhoe (Panama, Surinam)
- Pareuptychia ocirrhoe interjecta (d'Almeida, 1952) (Brazil: Rio de Janeiro, Bahia and Mato Grosso do Sul)
