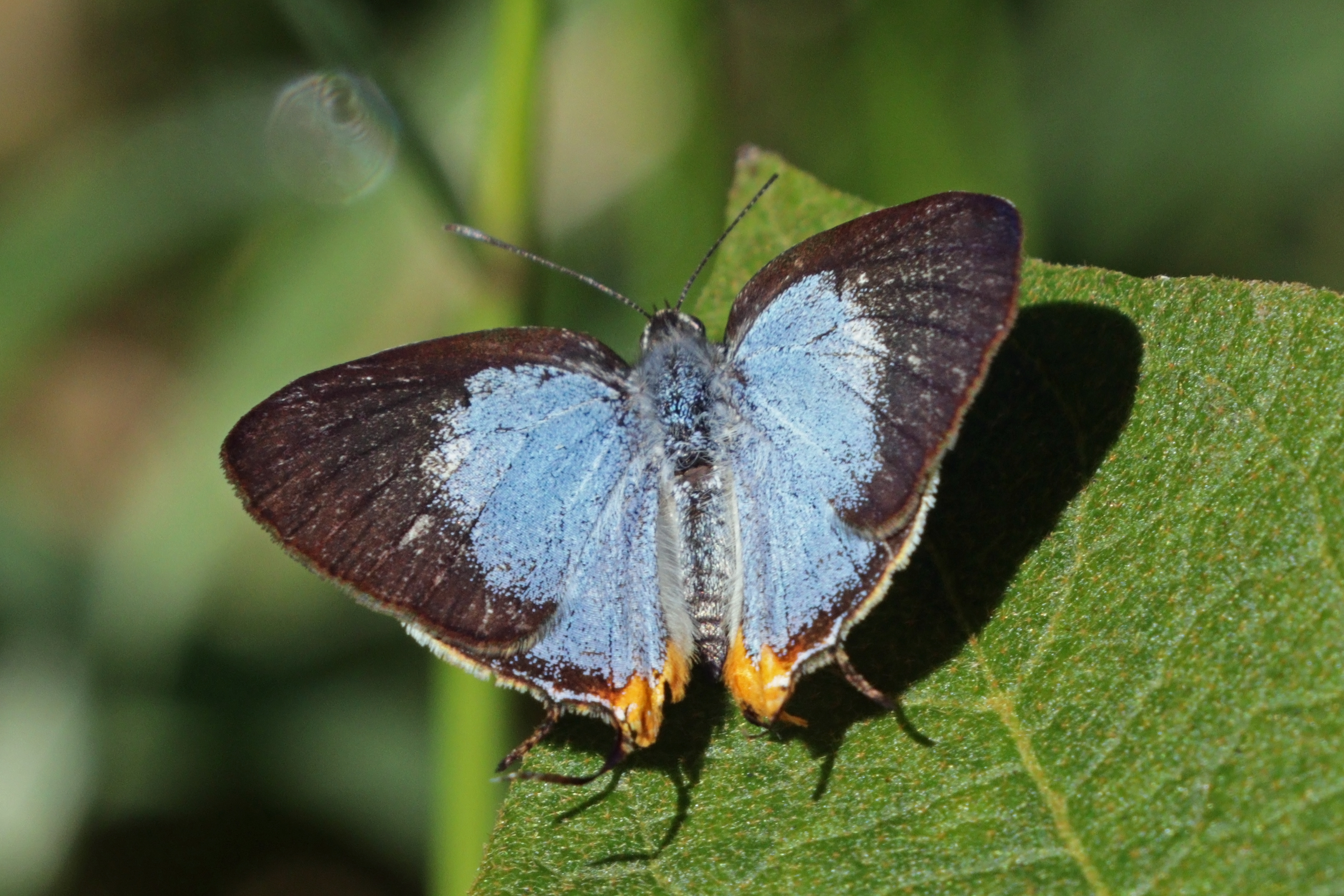

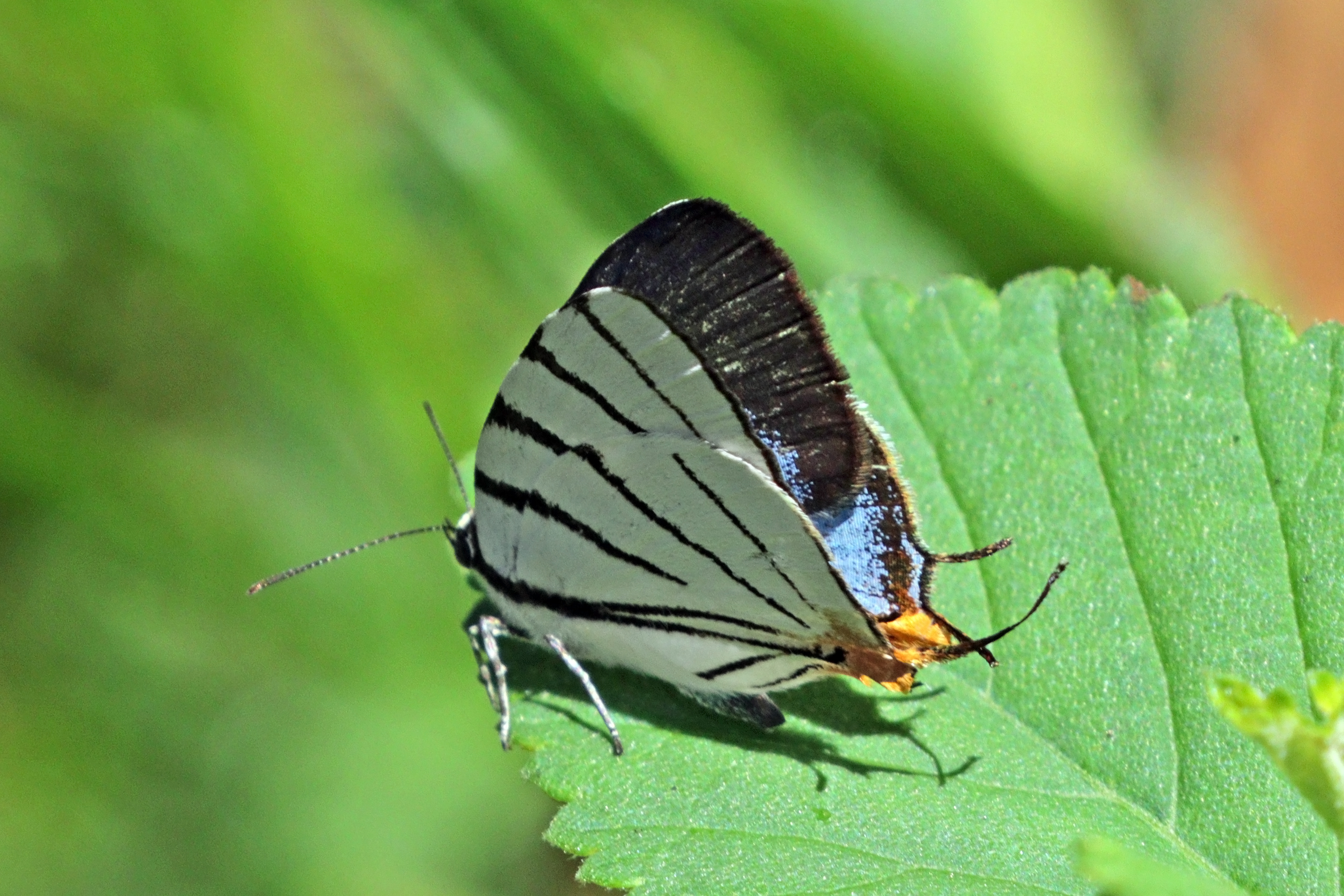
- both in Mount Totumas cloud forest Panama

Scientific classification
- Domain: Eukaryota
- Kingdom: Animalia
- Phylum: Arthropoda
- Class: Insecta
- Order: Lepidoptera
- Family: Lycaenidae
- Genus: Arawacus
- Species: A. sito

Binomial name
- Arawacus sito (Boisduval, 1836)

Synonyms
- Thecla sito Boisduval, 1836; Thecla phaenna Godman & Salvin, [1887]; Arawacus mexicana D'Abrera, 1995

= Arawacus sito =

Fine-lined stripe-streak

Species of butterfly

Arawacus sito, the fine-lined stripe-streak, is a butterfly of the family Lycaenidae. It is in found from Mexico, south to Central America, including Guatemala, Honduras, Nicaragua and Panama.
