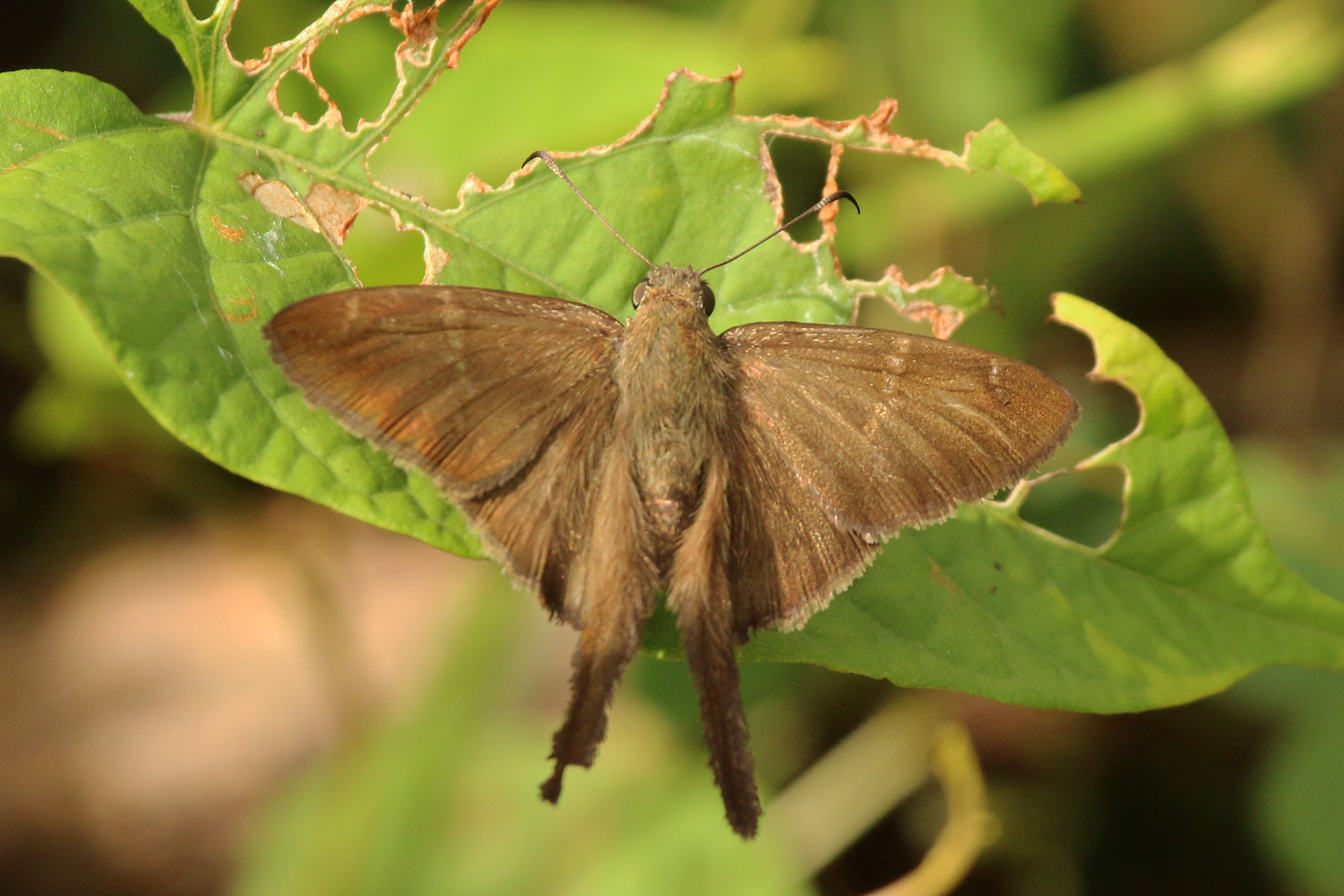
- In Tobago

Scientific classification
- Kingdom: Animalia
- Phylum: Arthropoda
- Class: Insecta
- Order: Lepidoptera
- Family: Hesperiidae
- Genus: Spicauda
- Species: S. simplicius

Binomial name
- Spicauda simplicius (Stoll, [1790])

Synonyms
- List: Papilio simplicius Stoll, [1790]; Goniurus pilatus Plötz, 1880; Goniurus gracillcauda Plötz, 1881; Thymele thiemei Ehrmann, 1907; Thymele borja Ehrmann, 1907; Urbanus simplicius (Stoll, [1790])

= Spicauda simplicius =

Plain longtail

Species of butterfly

Spicauda simplicius, the plain longtail, is a species of butterfly in the family Hesperiidae. It is found from Argentina, north through Central America, Mexico, and the West Indies to southern Texas and peninsular Florida.
