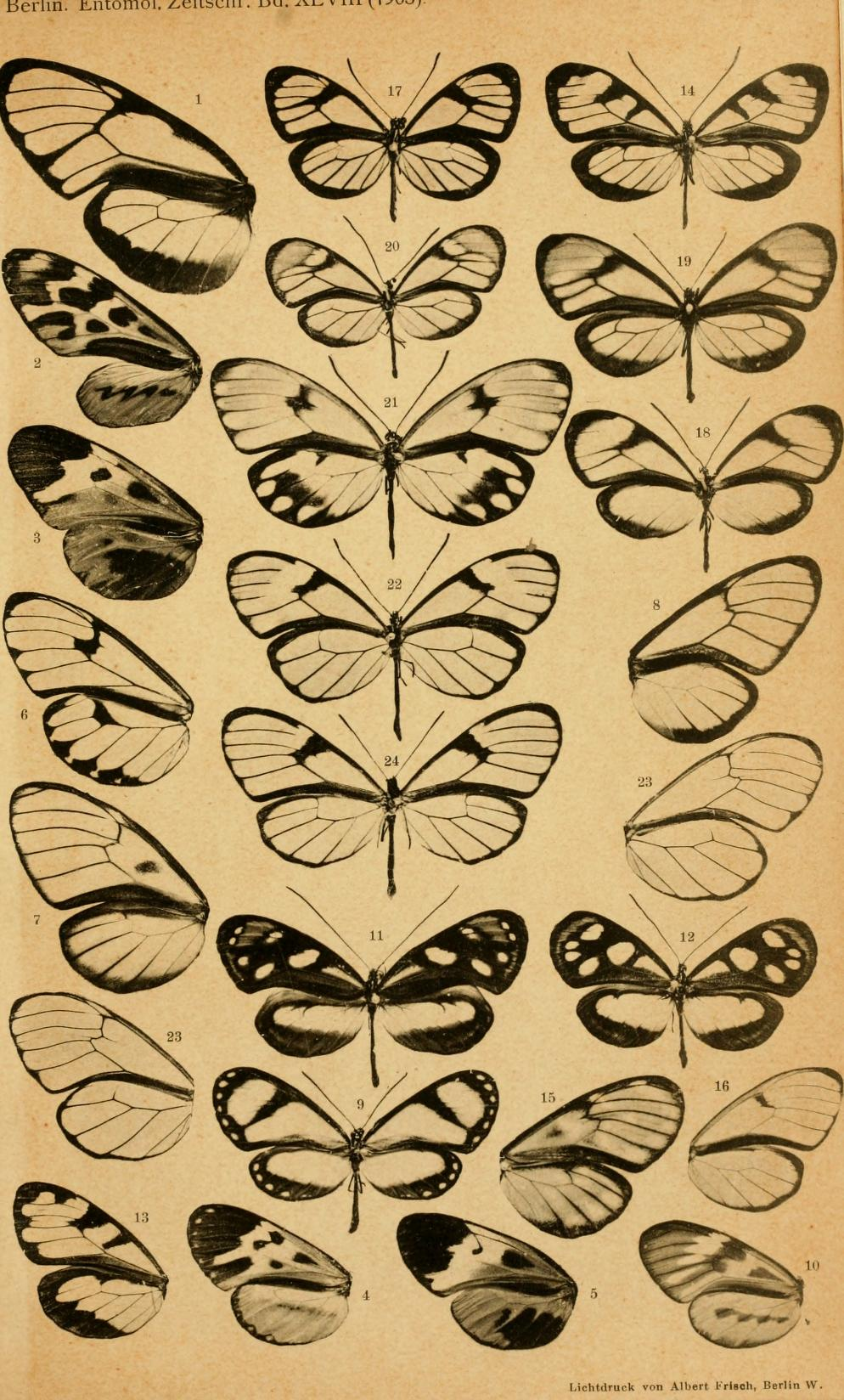
- Figures 5 and 6

Scientific classification
- Domain: Eukaryota
- Kingdom: Animalia
- Phylum: Arthropoda
- Class: Insecta
- Order: Lepidoptera
- Family: Nymphalidae
- Tribe: Ithomiini
- Genus: Napeogenes; Bates, 1862

Species
- See text

Synonyms
- Ceratonia Boisduval, 1870; Choridis Boisduval, 1870

= Napeogenes =

Genus of brush-footed butterflies

Napeogenes is a genus of clearwing (ithomiine) butterflies, named by Henry Walter Bates in 1862. They are in the brush-footed butterfly family, Nymphalidae.

== Species ==
Arranged alphabetically:

- Napeogenes achaea (Hewitson, 1869)
- Napeogenes apulia (Hewitson, 1858)
- Napeogenes benigna Weymer, 1899
- Napeogenes cranto C. & R. Felder, 1865
- Napeogenes duessa (Hewitson, 1859)
- Napeogenes flossina Butler, 1873
- Napeogenes glycera Godman, 1899
- Napeogenes gracilis Haensch, 1905
- Napeogenes harbona (Hewitson, 1869)
- Napeogenes inachia (Hewitson, 1855)
- Napeogenes juanjuiensis Fox & Real, 1971
- Napeogenes larilla (Hewitson, 1877)
- Napeogenes larina (Hewitson, 1856)
- Napeogenes lycora (Hewitson, 1870)
- Napeogenes peridia (Hewitson, 1854)
- Napeogenes pharo (C. & R. Felder, 1862)
- Napeogenes quadrilis Haensch, 1903
- Napeogenes rhezia (Geyer, [1834])
- Napeogenes sodalis Haensch, 1905
- Napeogenes stella (Hewitson, 1855)
- Napeogenes sulphureophila Bryk, 1937
- Napeogenes sylphis (Guérin-Méneville, [1844])
- Napeogenes tawaman Brevignon, 2007
- Napeogenes tolosa (Hewitson, 1855)
- Napeogenes verticilla (Hewitson, 1874)
