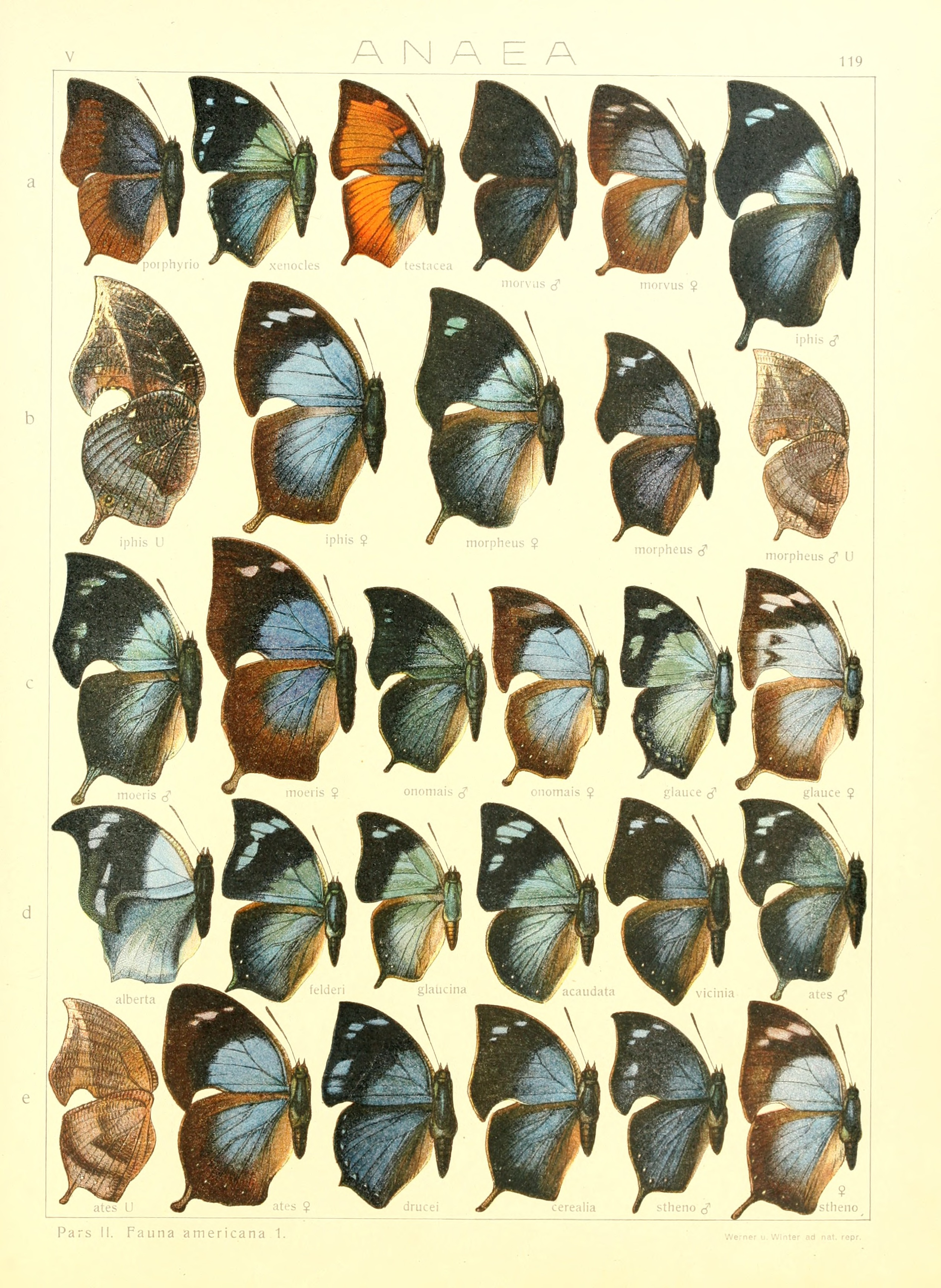
- Male and female in Seitz's Macrolepidoptera of the World

Scientific classification
- Kingdom: Animalia
- Phylum: Arthropoda
- Class: Insecta
- Order: Lepidoptera
- Family: Nymphalidae
- Genus: Memphis
- Species: M. oenomais

Binomial name
- Memphis oenomais (Boisduval, 1870)

Synonyms
- Paphia oenomais Boisduval, 1870; Paphia morta Druce, 1877; Anaea morta; Anaea oenomais

= Memphis oenomais =

Species of butterfly

Memphis oenomais is a species of leafwing found in South America (Mexico, Costa Rica, Belize, Panama, Bolivia, Peru, Brazil and Guyana).

== Description ==
Memphis oenomais is a butterfly with forewings with a humped costal edge, a pointed hooked apex, a concave outer edge near the apex, a pointed internal angle in a hook, a concave inner edge and hind wings each with a club-shaped tail. The upper side of the wings is more or less dark brown with a broad basal metallic blue suffusion. The reverse side is yellow ochre to orange ochre, shiny, and simulates a dead leaf.

== Biology ==
The host plants of its caterpillar are Crotons. The insect resides in all types of tropical rainforest below 1,000 m. It lives in the canopy.
