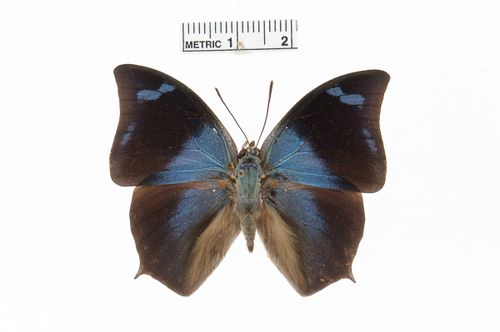

Scientific classification
- Kingdom: Animalia
- Phylum: Arthropoda
- Class: Insecta
- Order: Lepidoptera
- Family: Nymphalidae
- Tribe: Anaeini
- Genus: Memphis
- Species: M. hedemanni

Binomial name
- Memphis hedemanni (R. Felder, 1869)

= Memphis hedemanni =

Species of butterfly

Memphis hedemanni is a species of leafwing found in Mexico and Guatemala.

Memphis hedemanni is a butterfly with forewings with a concave outer edge and hindwings each with a tail. The upper side is light metallic blue barred and edged at the outer edge with brown or dark navy blue on the forewings, light metallic blue surrounded by purple or brown on the costal edge and inner edge on the hind wings. The reverse side is beige mottled with silvery-white and simulates a dead leaf.

It is smaller than Memphis glauce (119 c), apex of the forewing greatly protracted, pointed sickle-shaped, hindwings without tails, but distinctly angled at the third median vein. All the wings above steel-bluish black with 5 steel-blue submarginal spots, beneath of a glossy greyish white reddish brown, striated in white, with a median band being angled at the third median vein and fading away proximally, on the forewings with a submarginal, greyish green stripe, on the hindwings with almost disappearing black dots being interiorly marked in blue. images of type
