= Eurytides agesilaus fortis =

Scientific classification
- Domain: Eukaryota
- Kingdom: Animalia
- Phylum: Arthropoda
- Class: Insecta
- Order: Lepidoptera
- Family: Papilionidae
- Genus: Eurytides
- Species: E. agesilaus
- Subspecies: E. a. fortis

Trinomial name
- Eurytides agesilaus fortis (Rothschild & Jordan, 1906)

Synonyms
- Papilio agesilaus fortis Rothschild & Jordan, 1906; Protographium agesilaus fortis (Rothschild & Jordan, 1906)

Subspecies of butterfly

Eurytides agesilaus fortis, the short-lined kite-swallowtail, is a subspecies of butterfly of the family Papilionidae. It is found in North America, Mexico and Central America. The subspecies was first described by Walter Rothschild and Karl Jordan in 1906. It hybridizes with Protographium philolaus.

It has a wingspan of about 70–80 millimetres (2.8–3.1 inches). The first pair of wings are three-sided possessing wide black stripes) and on the margin a mark with two red spots bordered with white is visible. The coloration is white to whiteish green. On the undersides of the lower wings two black and red stripes are visible. The females are similar to males but have larger spots on the hindwings.
