= Eurytides agesilaus neosilaus =

Scientific classification
- Domain: Eukaryota
- Kingdom: Animalia
- Phylum: Arthropoda
- Class: Insecta
- Order: Lepidoptera
- Family: Papilionidae
- Genus: Eurytides
- Species: E. agesilaus
- Subspecies: E. a. neosilaus

Trinomial name
- Eurytides agesilaus neosilaus (Hopffer, 1866)

Synonyms
- Papilio neosilaus Hopffer, 1866; Protographium agesilaus neosilaus (Hopffer, 1866)

Subspecies of butterfly

Eurytides agesilaus neosilaus, the short-lined kite swallowtail, is a subspecies of butterfly in the family Papilionidae. It is found in Mexico and Central America. The subspecies was first described by Carl Heinrich Hopffer in 1866. Specimens are sold commercially to collectors.
