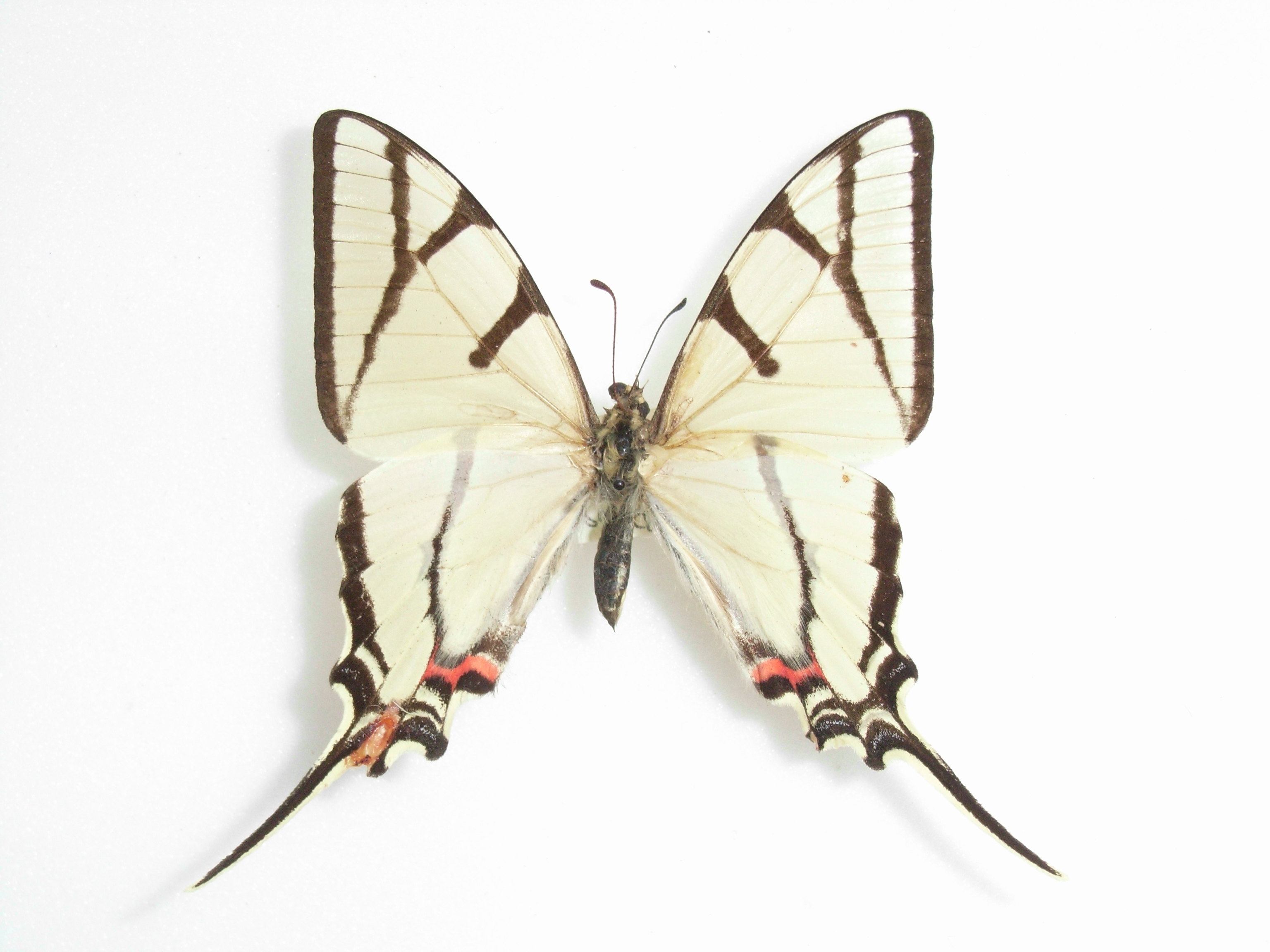

Scientific classification
- Kingdom: Animalia
- Phylum: Arthropoda
- Class: Insecta
- Order: Lepidoptera
- Family: Papilionidae
- Genus: Eurytides
- Species: E. bellerophon

Binomial name
- Eurytides bellerophon (Dalman, 1823)

Synonyms
- Papilio bellerophon Dahlman, 1823; Papilio coresilaus Godart, [1824]; Protesilaus swainsonius Swainson, 1833; Papilio bellerophon ab. confluens Hoffmann, 1934

= Eurytides bellerophon =

Species of butterfly

Eurytides bellerophon is a butterfly of the family Papilionidae. It is found in south-eastern Brazil (Minas Gerais, São Paulo and from Santa Catarina to Mato Grosso), Bolivia (Pando and Mapiri) and northern Argentina (Misiones).

Eurytides bellerophon is a large butterfly with a yellow body striped with brown, white wings with a slightly pointed apex and two long, thin tails at the rear. The forewings have a brown margin, two brown lines starting from the costal edge and drawing a “Y” going to the internal angle and a third very short one. The hind legs show blue markings and a red anal spot in the brown border.

The larvae feed on Guatteria nigrescens.
