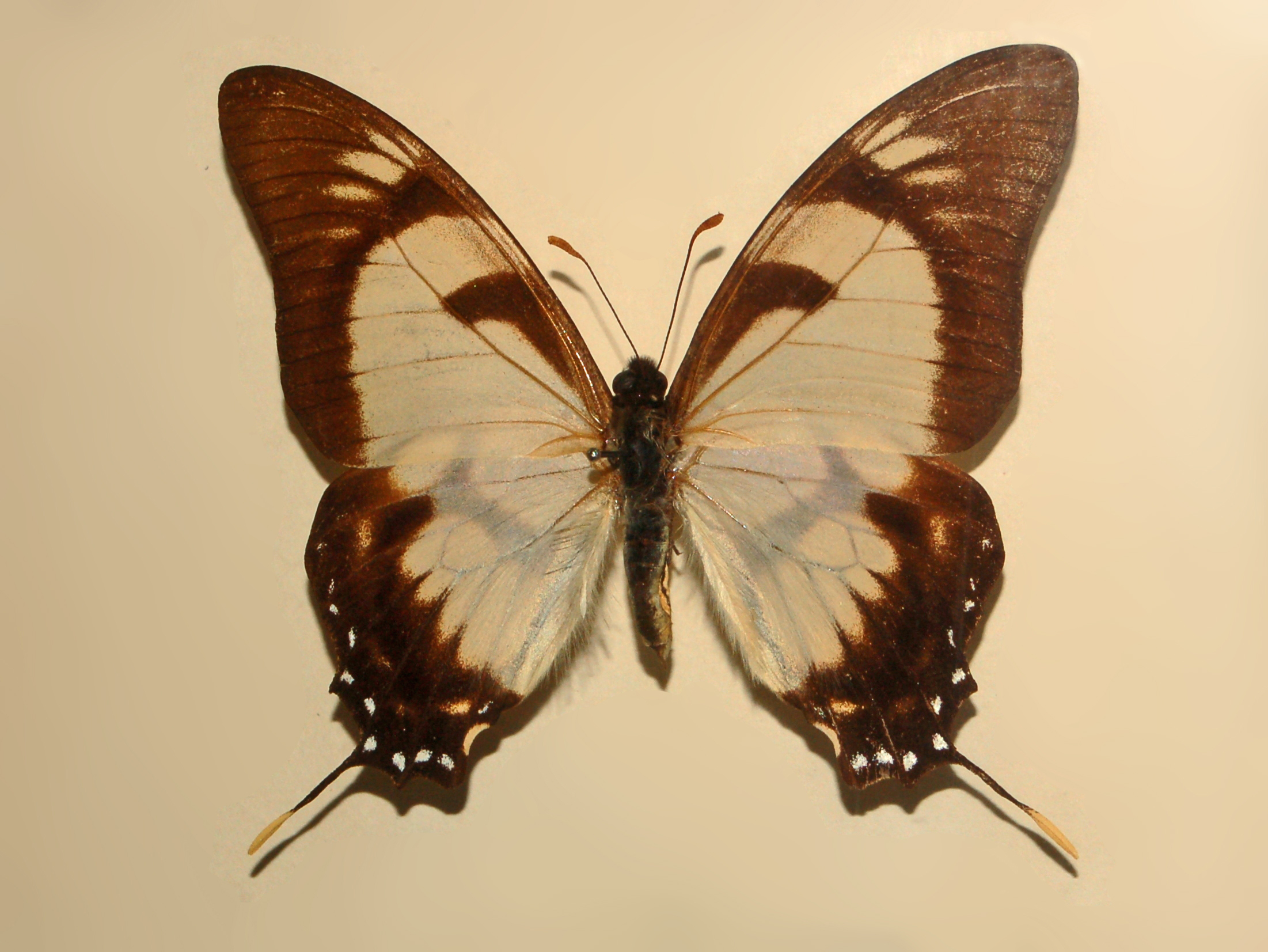
- Mounted specimen from Peru

Scientific classification
- Kingdom: Animalia
- Phylum: Arthropoda
- Class: Insecta
- Order: Lepidoptera
- Family: Papilionidae
- Genus: Eurytides
- Species: E. dolicaon

Binomial name
- Eurytides dolicaon (Cramer, 1776)

Synonyms
- Papilio dolicaon Cramer, [1775]; Papilio deicoon C. Felder & R. Felder, 1864; Papilio dolicaton draconarius f. frustulum Fruhstorfer, 1907; Papilio deileon C. Felder & R. Felder, 1865; Papilio deileon C. Felder & R. Felder, 1864; Papilio dolicaon draconarius Fruhstorfer, 1907; Papilio dolicaon draconarius Fruhstorfer, 1907; Papilio dolicaon anemos Fruhstorfer, 1910; Papilio dolicaon xanthophilus Röber, 1925; Papilio dolicaon hebrus Rothschild & Jordan, 1906

= Eurytides dolicaon =

Species of butterfly

Eurytides dolicaon, the dolicaon kite swallowtail, is a butterfly of the family Papilionidae.

== Description ==
Eurytides dolicaon is a large butterfly with a wingspan of about 80 millimetres (3.1 in). The basic colour of the wings is creamy white with black veins. The hindwings have very long and thin tails, generally dark brown or black with yellow tips. The edges of the uppersides of the wings are dark brown or black. The undersides of the hindwings have brown bands forming large creamy white areas. On the margins of the hindwings there are a series of blue lunules.

Larvae feed on Guatteria species, Ocotea species and Nectandra membranacea.

== Distribution ==
Eurytides dolicaon can be found in Central and South America (Guyana, south-eastern Brazil, Paraguay, Peru, eastern Colombia, eastern Ecuador, and north-western Venezuela).

== Habitat ==
This species is present in lowlands with wet rainforest at an elevation of about 0–400 metres (0–1,312 ft) above sea level.

== Subspecies ==
- Eurytides dolicaon dolicaon (Guyana)
- Eurytides dolicaon deicoon (C. Felder & R. Felder, 1864) (south-eastern Brazil, Paraguay)
- Eurytides dolicaon deileon (C. Felder & R. Felder, 1865) (eastern Colombia, eastern Ecuador)
- Eurytides dolicaon tromes (Rothschild & Jordan, 1906) (north-western Venezuela)
- Eurytides dolicaon septentrionalis Brown, 1994 (Panama)
- Eurytides dolicaon hebreus Brown & Lamas, 1994 (Colombia)
- Eurytides dolicaon cauraensis Möhn, 2002 (south-eastern Venezuela)
