= G. ferruginea =

G. ferruginea may refer to:

- Gallicolumba ferruginea, the Tanna ground dove, an extinct dove species from Vanuatu
- Guatteria ferruginea, a plant species endemic to Suriname

== See also ==
- Ferruginea (disambiguation)
