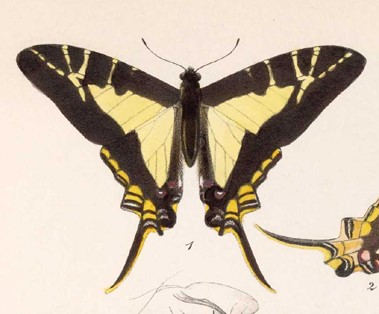

Scientific classification
- Kingdom: Animalia
- Phylum: Arthropoda
- Clade: Pancrustacea
- Class: Insecta
- Order: Lepidoptera
- Family: Papilionidae
- Genus: Eurytides
- Species: E. calliste

Binomial name
- Eurytides calliste (Bates, 1864)

Synonyms
- List: Papilio calliste Bates, 1864; Papilio l'orzae Boisduval, 1869; Papilio lorzae Boisduval, 1869; Eurytides calliste f. albida Beutelspächer, 1976; Papilio calliste olbius Rothschild & Jordan, 1906; Protographium calliste (Bates, 1864)

= Eurytides calliste =

Species of butterfly

Eurytides calliste is a species of butterfly in the family Papilionidae. It is found in the Neotropical realm.

== Description ==
Bands and spots of the wings pale yellow or greenish yellow, similarly arranged as in Protographium dioxippus; submarginal row of the forewing curved; hindwing with 2, rarely 3 red spots, and with 2 very large greenish yellow marginal spots from the 2. radial to the 1. median; underside of the hindwing with pale marginal band.

== Subspecies ==
- E. c. calliste SE.Mexico (Puebla, Veracruz, Tabasco, Campeche, Yucatán, Quintana Roo, Oaxaca, Chiapas), Belize, Guatemala, El Salvador, Honduras.The two outer cell-bands of the forewing clearly developed and the last but two more or less indicated, the discal area eraarginate at the cell before the 2. median.
- E. c. olbius (Rothschild & Jordan, 1906) Costa Rica - Panama (Chiriqui) Larger than the preceding (nominate) form; also the outer cell-bands of the forewing suffused with black in the middle; discal band broader, the black marginal area on both wings consequently narrower than in calliste; submarginal line of the forewing only vestigial from the 1. median backwards.
