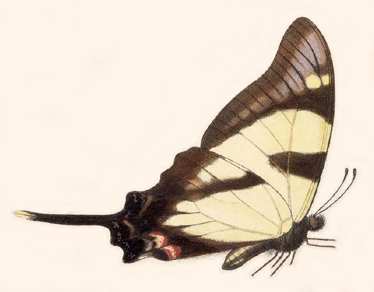

Scientific classification
- Kingdom: Animalia
- Phylum: Arthropoda
- Class: Insecta
- Order: Lepidoptera
- Family: Papilionidae
- Genus: Eurytides
- Species: E. orabilis

Binomial name
- Eurytides orabilis (Butler, 1872)

Synonyms
- Papilio orabilis Butler, 1872

= Eurytides orabilis =

Species of butterfly

Eurytides orabilis is a species of butterfly in the family Papilionidae and is native to the Americas.

== Description ==
The wingspan of E. orabilis is 46 to 56 mm (1.8 to 2.2 in). Both sexes are similar. The fore wing is black with the basal, postbasal, and postmedian areas being a cream-white color. A black stripe crosses through the middle of the cream-white area from the costa. The apical area has two creamy spots. The hind wing is black with cream-white basal, postbasal, and postmedian areas. A small red spot is present on the anal margin. The tails are black with yellowish tips.

== Subspecies ==
- Eurytides orabilis orabilis (Butler, 1872)
- Eurytides orabilis isocharis (Rothschild & Jordan 1906)

== Distribution ==
The nominate subspecies, E. o. orabilis, is found from Panama to Guatemala, and is also found on Costa Rica. E. o. isocharis is found in Colombia and Ecuador.

== Behavior ==
Males often fly above the tree canopy, while females fly along forest edges and streams. Adults use Hernandia didymantha and Cordia megalantha as nectar sources. Freshly emerged males will puddle on wet sand near the edges of streams.

== Life cycle ==
Females lay their white eggs singly on the leaves of Guatteria oliviformis and Guatteria tonduzii. The first instars of the caterpillar are gray-brown, with a saddle on the abdominal segments. The head is black, and the anal plate on the abdomen is yellow-green. The fifth instar is green with black spots on the thoracic segments. The first two and last three abdominal segments are also spotted with black, while the osmeterium is yellow.
