= Guatteria dura =

Conservation status
- Least Concern (IUCN 3.1)

Scientific classification
- Kingdom: Plantae
- Clade: Embryophytes
- Clade: Tracheophytes
- Clade: Spermatophytes
- Clade: Angiosperms
- Clade: Magnoliids
- Order: Magnoliales
- Family: Annonaceae
- Genus: Guatteria
- Species: G. dura

Binomial name
- Guatteria dura R.E.Fr.

Synonyms
- Guatteria kuhlmannii R.E.Fr.

Species of flowering plant

Guatteria dura is a species of flowering plant in the Annonaceae family. It is a tree native to Bolivia, northern and west-central Brazil, Colombia, Peru, and Venezuela, where it grows in lowland Amazon rainforest.
