= Eurytides zonaria =

Scientific classification
- Kingdom: Animalia
- Phylum: Arthropoda
- Class: Insecta
- Order: Lepidoptera
- Family: Papilionidae
- Genus: Eurytides
- Species: E. zonaria

Binomial name
- Eurytides zonaria (Butler, 1869)

Synonyms
- Papilio zonaria Butler, [1870]; Neographium zonaria (Butler, 1869); Protographium zonaria (Butler, 1869)

Species of butterfly

Eurytides zonaria is a species of butterfly in the family Papilionidae. It is endemic to the Caribbean island of Hispaniola (in both Haiti and the Dominican Republic).

== Description ==
The pale bands narrow; the 4. and 5. pale green cell-bands of the forewing continuous with the discal band, narrow, separated from one another.
