= Guatteria ucayalina =

Conservation status
- Least Concern (IUCN 3.1)

Scientific classification
- Kingdom: Plantae
- Clade: Embryophytes
- Clade: Tracheophytes
- Clade: Spermatophytes
- Clade: Angiosperms
- Clade: Magnoliids
- Order: Magnoliales
- Family: Annonaceae
- Genus: Guatteria
- Species: G. ucayalina

Binomial name
- Guatteria ucayalina Huber

Synonyms
- Guatteria boliviana H.J.P.Winkl.; Guatteria cardoniana R.E.Fr.; Guatteria lawrancei R.E.Fr.; Guatteria longepetiolata R.E.Fr.; Guatteria macropetala R.E.Fr.; Guatteria recurvisepala R.E.Fr.; Guatteria schunkevigoi D.R.Simpson; Guatteria speciosa R.E.Fr.

Species of flowering plant

Guatteria ucayalina is a species of flowering plant in the family Annonaceae. It is a tree native to the tropical Americas, ranging from Nicaragua to Suriname, northern Brazil, and Bolivia.
