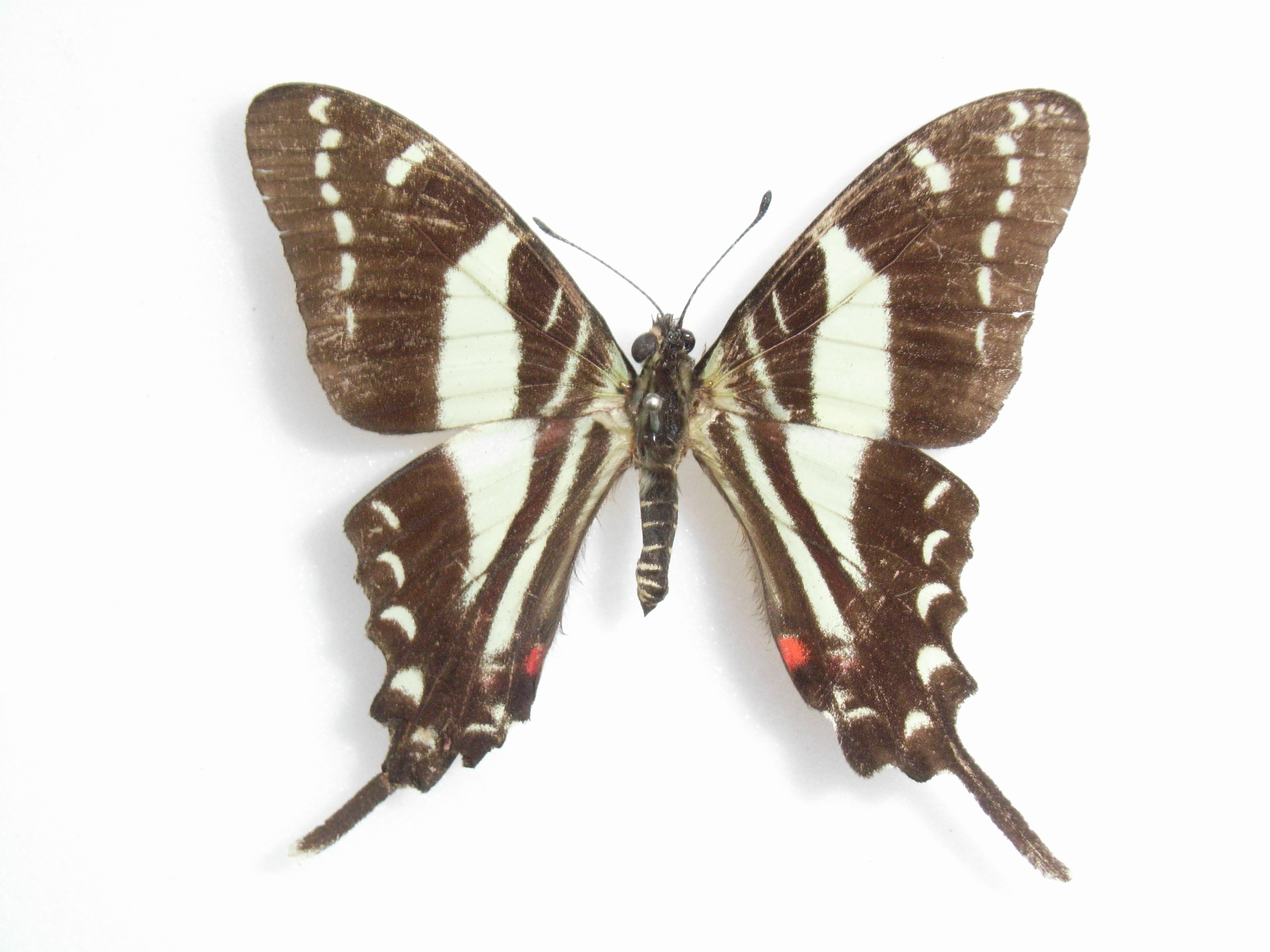

Conservation status
- Vulnerable (IUCN 2.3)

Scientific classification
- Kingdom: Animalia
- Phylum: Arthropoda
- Clade: Pancrustacea
- Class: Insecta
- Order: Lepidoptera
- Family: Papilionidae
- Genus: Eurytides
- Species: E. marcellinus

Binomial name
- Eurytides marcellinus (Doubleday, 1845)

Synonyms
- Protographium marcellinus (Doubleday, 1845)

= Eurytides marcellinus =

Jamaican kite

Species of butterfly

Eurytides marcellinus, the Jamaican kite, is a species of butterfly in the family Papilionidae. It is endemic to Jamaica. Its conservation status is rated as vulnerable.
