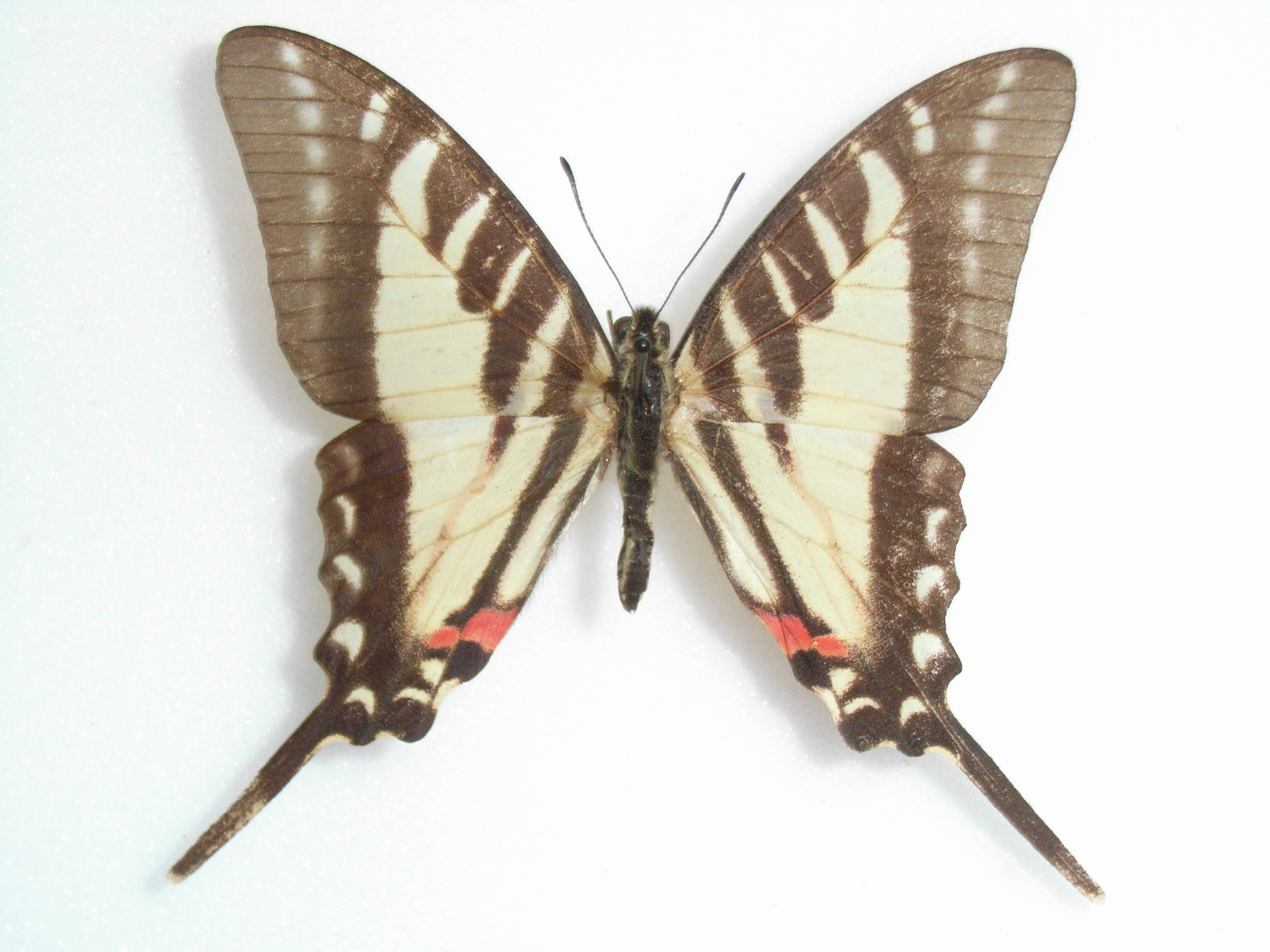

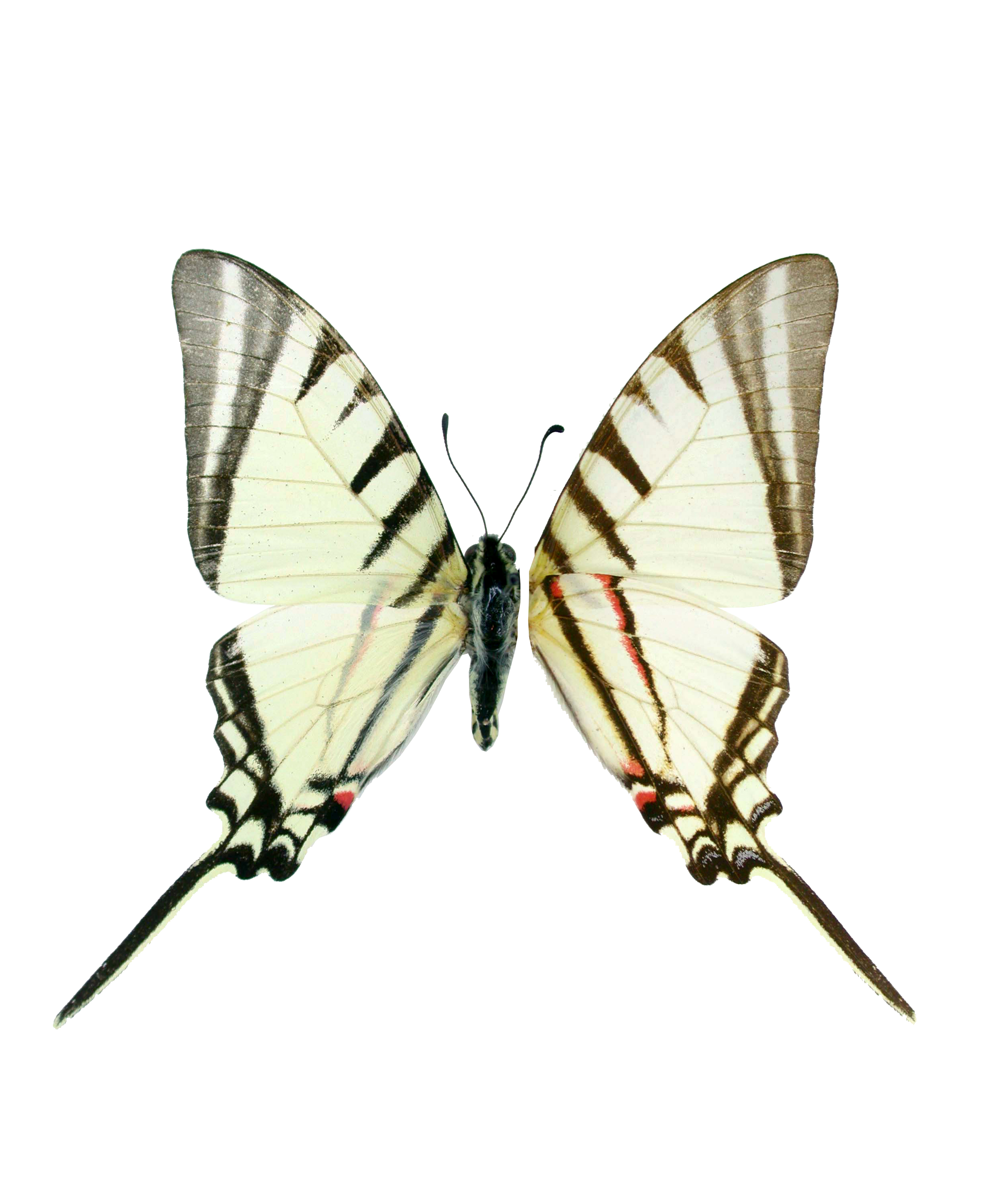

Scientific classification
- Kingdom: Animalia
- Phylum: Arthropoda
- Class: Insecta
- Order: Lepidoptera
- Family: Papilionidae
- Genus: Eurytides
- Species: E. anaxilaus

Binomial name
- Eurytides anaxilaus (C. & R. Felder, 1865)

Synonyms
- List: Papilio anaxilaus C. & R. Felder, 1865; Papilio arcesilaus Lucas, 1852 (preocc.); Eurytides arcesilaus; Neographium anaxilaus (C. & R. Felder, 1865); Protographium anaxilaus (C. & R. Felder, 1865)

= Eurytides anaxilaus =

Species of butterfly

Eurytides anaxilaus is a species of butterfly in the family Papilionidae. It is found in Panama, northern Venezuela and eastern and northern Colombia.
