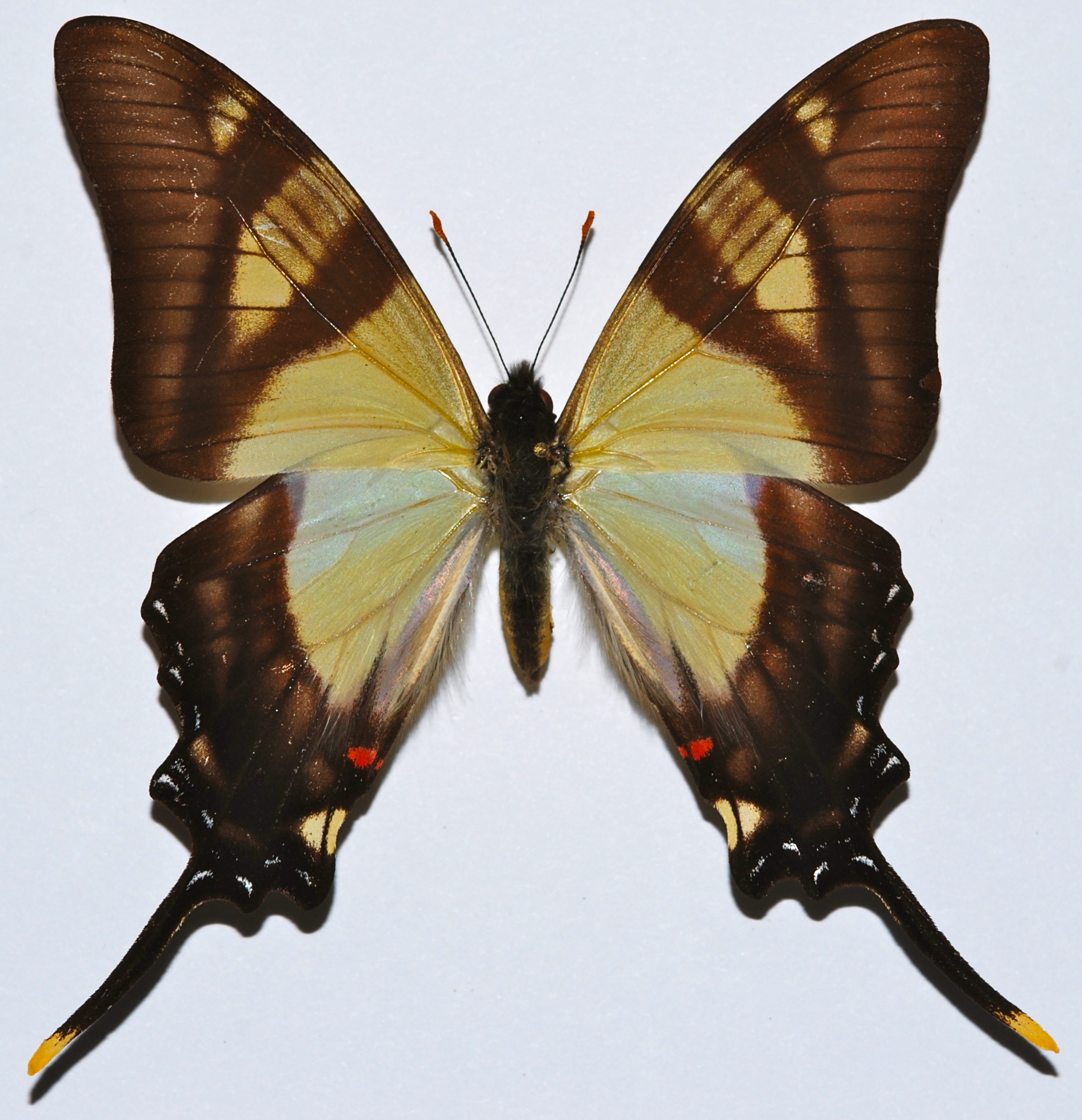
- Eurytides serville. Mounted specimen, dorsal view

Scientific classification
- Kingdom: Animalia
- Phylum: Arthropoda
- Class: Insecta
- Order: Lepidoptera
- Family: Papilionidae
- Genus: Eurytides
- Species: E. serville

Binomial name
- Eurytides serville (Godart, 1824)

Synonyms
- Papilio serville Godart, [1824]; Papilio boliviana Weeks, 1905; Papilio serville boliviana Fruhstorfer, 1907; Papilio serville ab. xanthocellis Boullet & Le Cerf, 1912; Papilio serville acritus Rothschild & Jordan, 1906

= Eurytides serville =

Species of butterfly

Eurytides serville is a species of butterfly found in the Neotropical realm.

== Description ==
Forewing with broad black cell-band, which runs obliquely from the costal margin to the marginal area, being united with the latter. In the forewing the first and send subcostal distally confluent with the costa, the second subcostal rarely free. No red or yellow band is present on the under surface of the hindwing. In E. s. acritus the spots on head and breast small, also the yellowish lateral stripe of the abdomen reduced, these markings sometimes absent; cell of the hindwing usually without blackish streaks. E. s. serville spots on breast and head always present, abdomen with two yellowish stripes on each side, of which the upper one is broad; cell-streaks of the forewing distinct, the subapical area of the cell always shaded with brown; the pale patches before the margin of the hindwing, on the under surface, more distinct than in E. s. acritus.

== Subspecies ==
- E. s. serville (southern Colombia, Peru, Bolivia, Ecuador: Rio Napo, Loja)
- E. s. acritus (Rothschild & Jordan, 1906) (Colombia: east Cordillera, north-western Venezuela: Tachira, Mérida)

== Status ==
Common. No known threats.

== Taxonomy ==
Possibly conspecific with Eurytides columbus.
