= Eurytides salvini =

- Eurytides salvini is the top image in this plate from William Chapman Hewitson's Illustrations of New Species of Exotic Butterflies

Scientific classification
- Kingdom: Animalia
- Phylum: Arthropoda
- Clade: Pancrustacea
- Class: Insecta
- Order: Lepidoptera
- Family: Papilionidae
- Genus: Eurytides
- Species: E. salvini

Binomial name
- Eurytides salvini (Bates, 1864)

Synonyms
- Papilio salvini Bates, 1864; Papilio eacus Godman & Salvin, [1890]; Eurytides salvini f. ochracea Beutelspacher, 1976

Species of butterfly

Eurytides salvini, Salvin's kite swallowtail, is a species of butterfly found in the Neotropical realm in southern Veracruz, Tabasco, Oaxaca, Chiapas (south-eastern Mexico), Belize and Verapaz (Guatemala).

== Description ==
The black bands very much reduced, a narrow band in the middle of the cell, not extending beyond the median vein; under surface glossy white; hindwing with black-brown discal band which runs almost straight from the costal margin to the red anal spot. 1. and 2. subcostals of the forewing distally confluent with the costa. Guatemala, British Honduras and (doubtfully) Yucatán; most of the specimens in collections come from the woods in northern Verapaz, Guatemala.

== Status ==
Uncommon. No known threats.

== Etymology ==
The name honours Osbert Salvin.
