= Eurytides iphitas =

Yellow kite swallowtail

Conservation status
- Endangered (IUCN 3.1)

Scientific classification
- Kingdom: Animalia
- Phylum: Arthropoda
- Clade: Pancrustacea
- Class: Insecta
- Order: Lepidoptera
- Family: Papilionidae
- Genus: Eurytides
- Species: E. iphitas

Binomial name
- Eurytides iphitas Hübner, 1821

Species of butterfly

Eurytides iphitas, commonly known as the yellow kite swallowtail, is a species of butterfly in the family Papilionidae. It is an endangered species that is endemic to Brazil.

== Description ==
Eurytides iphitas is a large butterfly with a black body, fore wings with a concave outer edge and hind wings with a long, very thin tail. The upper side is very pale yellow with black veins on the forewings with a wide black marginal border and apex and two bands, one from the costal edge to the middle of the outer edge and the other along the costal edge. The hind legs have a wide black border like the thin tail. The reverse is pearly with similar ornamentation.
