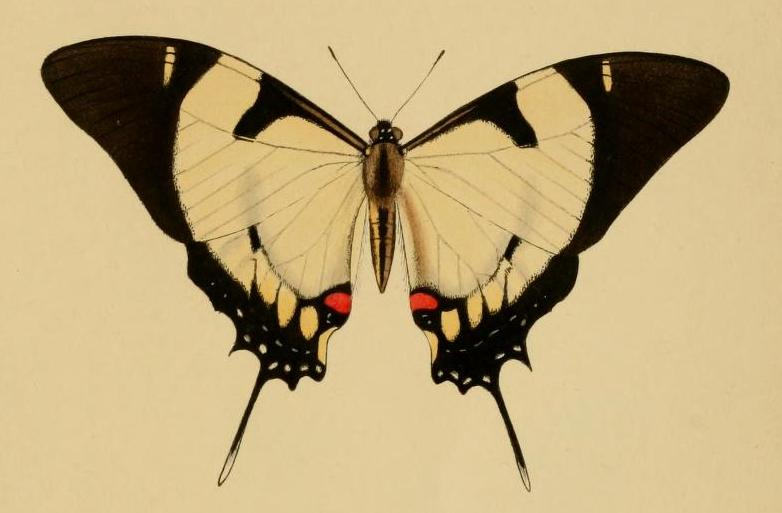

Scientific classification
- Kingdom: Animalia
- Phylum: Arthropoda
- Class: Insecta
- Order: Lepidoptera
- Family: Papilionidae
- Genus: Eurytides
- Species: E. callias

Binomial name
- Eurytides callias (Rothschild & Jordan, 1906)

Synonyms
- Papilio callias Rothschild & Jordan, 1906; Papilio columbus Hewitson, 1850

= Eurytides callias =

Species of butterfly

Eurytides callias is a butterfly of the family Papilionidae. It is found in French Guiana, Brazil (Amazonas), southern Venezuela (Yavita, Rio Ocamo, Rio Cunucunuma), eastern Ecuador (Napo) and Peru.

It is a large butterfly with a wingspan around 85 mm, white in colour with a slightly pointed apex with two long thin tails at the posterior. The forewings have a brown apex and a brown border. The hind legs show blue lunules in the brown border and a red anal spot
