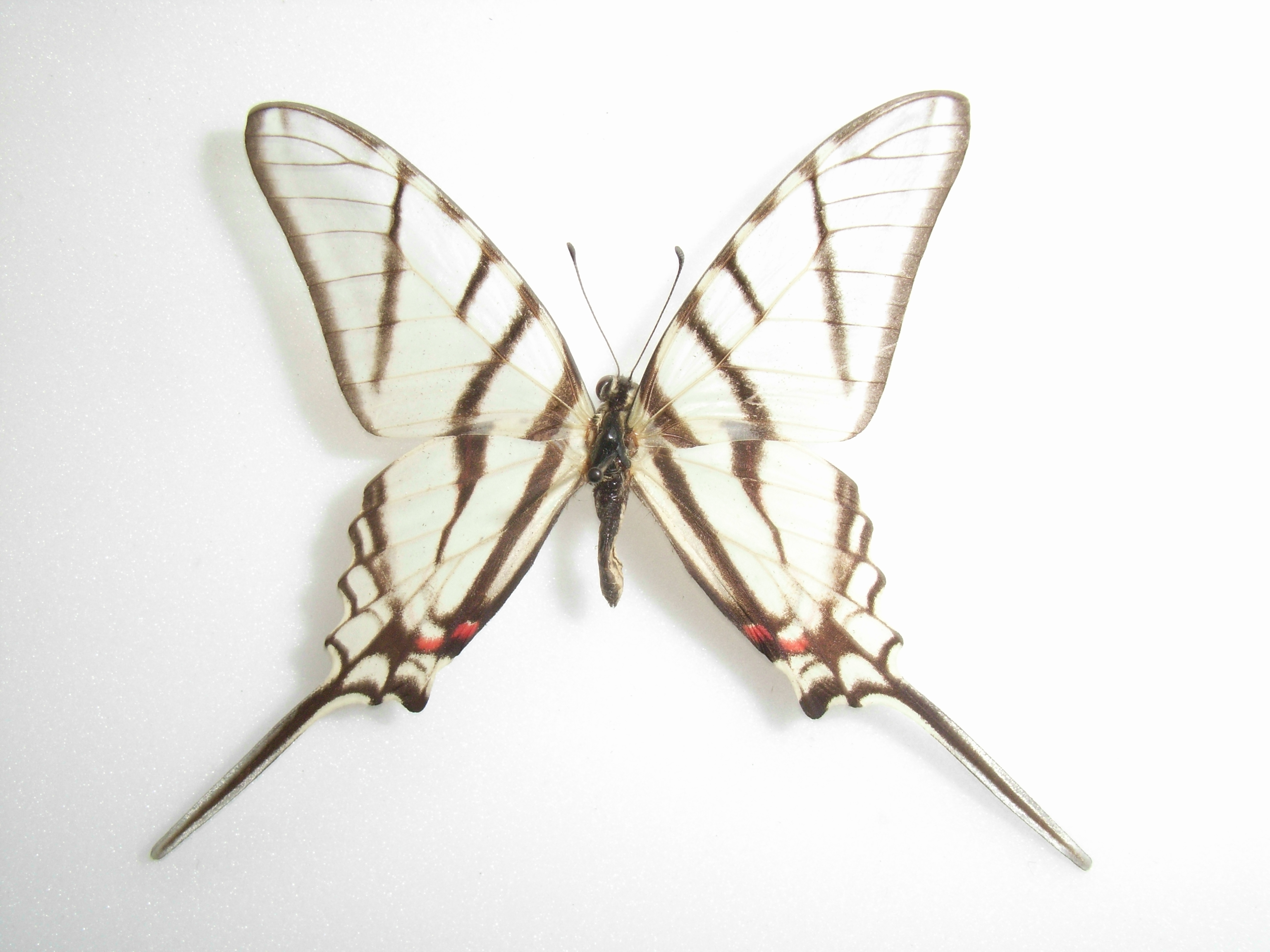

Scientific classification
- Kingdom: Animalia
- Phylum: Arthropoda
- Clade: Pancrustacea
- Class: Insecta
- Order: Lepidoptera
- Family: Papilionidae
- Genus: Eurytides
- Species: E. epidaus

Binomial name
- Eurytides epidaus (Doubleday, 1846)

Synonyms
- List: Papilio epidaus Doubleday, 1846; Eurytides epidaus; Neographium epidaus; Papilio fenochionis Salvin & Godman, 1868; Protographium epidaus (Doubleday, 1846)

= Eurytides epidaus =

Species of butterfly

Eurytides epidaus, the Mexican kite swallowtail or long-tailed kite swallowtail, is a butterfly of the family Papilionidae. It is found in Mexico and Central America.

The wingspan is 40–45 mm.

The larvae feed on Annona reticulata and Rollinia species

== Subspecies ==
There are three recognised subspecies:

- Eurytides epidaus epidaus (southern Mexico (Tamaulipas, Puebla, Veracruz, Tabasco, Yucatán, Quintana Roo, N. Oaxaca, N. Chiapas), Belize, Guatemala, El Salvador, Honduras, Nicaragua, Costa Rica)
- Eurytides epidaus tepicus (Rothschild & Jordan, 1906) western Mexico: Sinaloa, Nayarit, Jalisco, Colima)
- Eurytides epidaus fenochionis (Salvin & Godman, 1868) (south-western Mexico: Michoacán, Guerrero, Morelos, Oaxaca, S. Veracruz, Chiapas)
