= Guatteria procera =

Conservation status
- Vulnerable (IUCN 3.1)

Scientific classification
- Kingdom: Plantae
- Clade: Embryophytes
- Clade: Tracheophytes
- Clade: Spermatophytes
- Clade: Angiosperms
- Clade: Magnoliids
- Order: Magnoliales
- Family: Annonaceae
- Genus: Guatteria
- Species: G. procera

Binomial name
- Guatteria procera R.E.Fr.

Synonyms
- Guatteria brachypoda R.E.Fr.; Guatteria williamsii R.E.Fr.

Species of flowering plant

Guatteria procera is a species of flowering plant in the Annonaceae family. It is a tree native to northern Brazil, Guyana, Suriname, and Venezuela.
