= Guatteria modesta =

Conservation status
- Least Concern (IUCN 3.1)

Scientific classification
- Kingdom: Plantae
- Clade: Embryophytes
- Clade: Tracheophytes
- Clade: Spermatophytes
- Clade: Angiosperms
- Clade: Magnoliids
- Order: Magnoliales
- Family: Annonaceae
- Genus: Guatteria
- Species: G. modesta

Binomial name
- Guatteria modesta Diels

Synonyms
- Guatteria chlorantha Diels; Guatteria geminiflora R.E.Fr.; Guatteria geminiflora var. ochrantha R.E.Fr.; Guatteria glaberrima R.E.Fr.; Guatteria puncticulata R.E.Fr.; Guatteria tessmannii R.E.Fr.

Species of plant

Guatteria modesta is a species of flowering plant in the Annonaceae family. It is a tree native to northern and northeastern Brazil, Colombia, Ecuador, and Peru.
