= Guatteria eriopoda =

Conservation status
- Data Deficient (IUCN 3.1)

Scientific classification
- Kingdom: Plantae
- Clade: Embryophytes
- Clade: Tracheophytes
- Clade: Spermatophytes
- Clade: Angiosperms
- Clade: Magnoliids
- Order: Magnoliales
- Family: Annonaceae
- Genus: Guatteria
- Species: G. eriopoda

Binomial name
- Guatteria eriopoda DC.

Species of plant

Guatteria eriopoda is a species of plant in the Annonaceae family. It is endemic to Peru.
