= Guatteria microcarpa =

Conservation status
- Near Threatened (IUCN 3.1)

Scientific classification
- Kingdom: Plantae
- Clade: Embryophytes
- Clade: Tracheophytes
- Clade: Spermatophytes
- Clade: Angiosperms
- Clade: Magnoliids
- Order: Magnoliales
- Family: Annonaceae
- Genus: Guatteria
- Species: G. microcarpa

Binomial name
- Guatteria microcarpa Ruiz & Pav. ex G.Don

Synonyms
- Guatteria sodiroi Diels in Beibl. Bot. Jahrb. Syst. 91: 42 (1907)

Species of flowering plant

Guatteria microcarpa is a species of plant in the Annonaceae family. It is endemic to Ecuador and Colombia. Its natural habitat is subtropical or tropical moist lowland forests. It is threatened by habitat loss.

It was first published in Gen. Hist. 1: 100 in 1831.
