= Guatteria liesneri =

Conservation status
- Least Concern (IUCN 3.1)

Scientific classification
- Kingdom: Plantae
- Clade: Embryophytes
- Clade: Tracheophytes
- Clade: Spermatophytes
- Clade: Angiosperms
- Clade: Magnoliids
- Order: Magnoliales
- Family: Annonaceae
- Genus: Guatteria
- Species: G. liesneri

Binomial name
- Guatteria liesneri D.M.Johnson & N.A.Murray

Synonyms
- Guatteria anthracina Scharf & Maas

Species of flowering plant

Guatteria liesneri is a species of flowering plant in the Annonaceae family. It is a tree native to northern Brazil, Colombia, Ecuador, the Guianas, Peru, and Venezuela.
