= Guatteria jefensis =

Conservation status
- Endangered (IUCN 3.1)

Scientific classification
- Kingdom: Plantae
- Clade: Tracheophytes
- Clade: Angiosperms
- Clade: Magnoliids
- Order: Magnoliales
- Family: Annonaceae
- Genus: Guatteria
- Species: G. jefensis

Binomial name
- Guatteria jefensis Barringer

Species of flowering plant

Guatteria jefensis is a species of flowering plant in the Annonaceae family. It is a shrub or tree endemic to Panama. It is threatened by habitat loss.
