= Guatteria hirsuta =

Conservation status
- Least Concern (IUCN 3.1)

Scientific classification
- Kingdom: Plantae
- Clade: Embryophytes
- Clade: Tracheophytes
- Clade: Spermatophytes
- Clade: Angiosperms
- Clade: Magnoliids
- Order: Magnoliales
- Family: Annonaceae
- Genus: Guatteria
- Species: G. hirsuta

Binomial name
- Guatteria hirsuta Ruiz & Pav.

Synonyms
- Synonymy: Guatteria alutacea Diels; Guatteria alutacea f. angustifolia (R.E.Fr.) R.E.Fr.; Guatteria alutacea var. angustifolia R.E.Fr.; Guatteria alutacea var. steinbachii R.E.Fr.; Guatteria augusti Diels; Guatteria brevipedicellata R.E.Fr.; Guatteria cestrifolia Triana & Planch.; Guatteria chocoensis R.E.Fr.; Guatteria curvipetala R.E.Fr.; Guatteria ecuadorensis R.E.Fr.; Guatteria excelsa Poepp. ex Mart.; Guatteria guentheriana Diels; Guatteria jamundensis R.E.Fr.; Guatteria juruensis Diels; Guatteria klugii R.E.Fr.; Guatteria latisepala R.E.Fr.; Guatteria laurina Triana & Planch.; Guatteria longipes Triana & Planch.; Guatteria melinii R.E.Fr.; Guatteria metensis R.E.Fr.; Guatteria persicifolia Triana & Planch.; Guatteria pilosula Planch. & Linden

Species of plant

Guatteria hirsuta is a species of flowering plant in the Annonaceae family. It is a tree native to Bolivia, northern Brazil, Colombia, Ecuador, Peru, and Venezuela.
