= Guatteria grandiflora =

Conservation status
- Vulnerable (IUCN 3.1)

Scientific classification
- Kingdom: Plantae
- Clade: Embryophytes
- Clade: Tracheophytes
- Clade: Spermatophytes
- Clade: Angiosperms
- Clade: Magnoliids
- Order: Magnoliales
- Family: Annonaceae
- Genus: Guatteria
- Species: G. grandiflora

Binomial name
- Guatteria grandiflora Donn.Sm.

Synonyms
- Guatteria anomala R.E.Fr.

Species of plant

Guatteria anomala is a species of flowering plant in the Annonaceae family. It is a tree native to Guatemala, Honduras, and southern Mexico. It is threatened by habitat loss.
