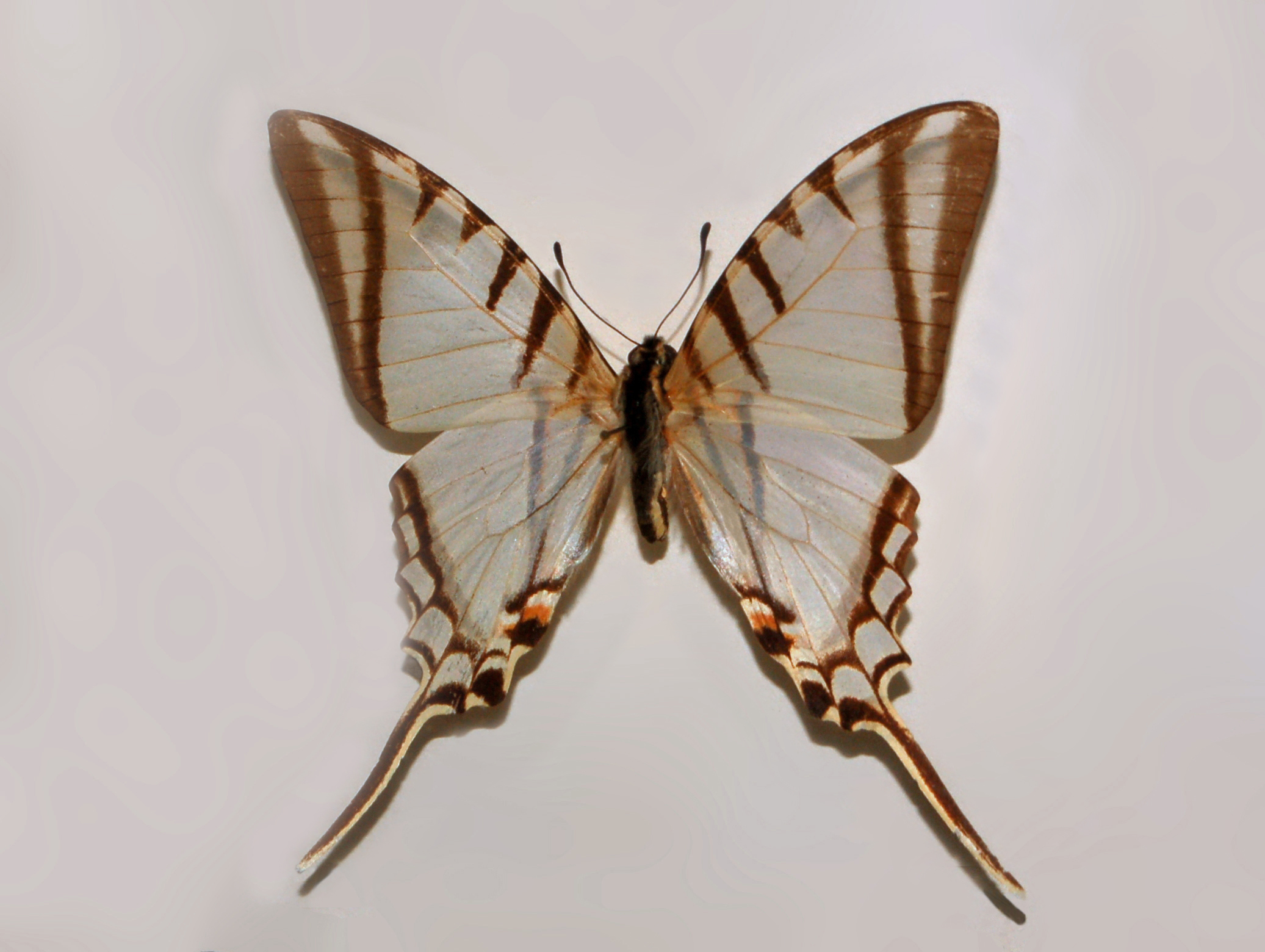
- Mounted specimen from Colombia
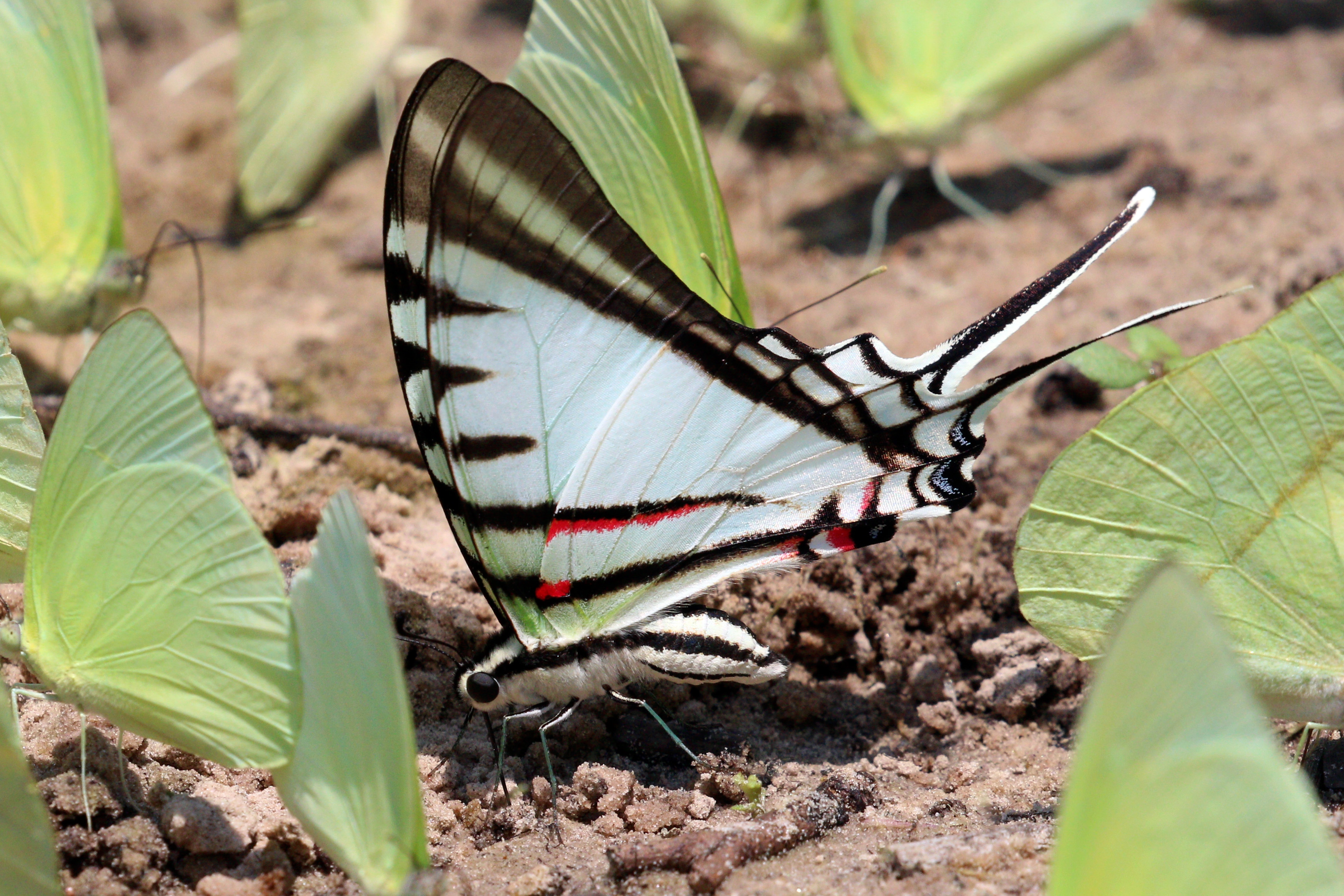
- E. a. agesilaus underside Cristalino River, Southern Amazon, Brazil

Scientific classification
- Kingdom: Animalia
- Phylum: Arthropoda
- Clade: Pancrustacea
- Class: Insecta
- Order: Lepidoptera
- Family: Papilionidae
- Genus: Eurytides
- Species: E. agesilaus

Binomial name
- Eurytides agesilaus (Guérin-Méneville & Percheron, 1835)

Synonyms
- List: Papilio agesilaus Guérin-Méneville & Percheron, 1835; Papilio conon Gray, [1853]; Papilio conon Hewitson, 1854; Papilio agesilaus agesilaus septemlineatus Eimer, 1889; Papilio arnapes Ehrmann, 1919; Papilio agesilaus ab. fermata (Bryk, 1930); Papilio neosilaus Hopffer, 1866; Papilio autosilaus var. multesilaus Ehrmann, 1919; Papilio glaucolaus sztolcmani Prüffer, 1922; Protographium_agesilaus (Guérin-Méneville & Percheron, 1835); Neographium agesilaus tenebricosus Möhn, 2002

= Eurytides agesilaus =

Species of butterfly

Eurytides agesilaus, the short-lined kite swallowtail, is a medium-sized species of butterfly in the family Papilionidae.

== Description ==
Eurytides agesilaus has a wingspan of about 70–80 millimetres (2.8–3.1 in). The forewings are triangular shaped and the hindwings are adorned with a long sword-like tails. The basic colour of the wings is greenish white. The forewings have seven black bands and a black marking with two red spots bordered with white on the margins. On the undersides of the hindwings there are two black and red streaks. The females are like the males but have rather larger pale submarginal spots on the hindwings. They are easy to recognise by the red line of the hindwing being edged with black distally.

== Biology ==
Larvae feed on Rollinia emarginata.

== Distribution ==
This species is mainly present in Mexico, Costa Rica, Panama, Nicaragua, Ecuador, Colombia, Venezuela, Brazil, Peru, Bolivia and Paraguay.

== Subspecies ==
- Eurytides agesilaus agesilaus (Colombia, northern Venezuela)
- Eurytides agesilaus eimeri (Rothschild & Jordan, 1906) (Costa Rica, Panama, western Colombia) The transparent submarginal band of the forewing between the fourth and fifth subcostal at most as broad as the black postdiscal band which is placed at its proximal side.
- Eurytides agesilaus fortis (Rothschild & Jordan, 1906) (western Mexico) The black bands broad, first and second bands of the forewing about two-thirds as broad as the interspace, both continued to the hindmargin, or the second band at least extending beyond the second submedian; the white submarginal band not broader than the black postdiscal band, the latter not divided longitudinally by a pale line; abdominal margin of the hindwing black, the two red anal spots surrounded with black.
- Eurytides agesilaus neosilaus (Hopffer, 1866) (Mexico to Nicaragua) The black bands narrower than in fortis, the first and second bands of the forewing at most half as broad as the white interspace, the transparent submarginal band broader than the black postdiscal band; abdominal margin of the hindwing partly white, the red anal spots anteriorly broadly edged with white, much less broadly surrounded with black than in fortis.
- Eurytides agesilaus autosilaus (Bates, 1861) (Venezuela to Brazil, Colombia, Ecuador, Peru, Bolivia) Postdiscal band of the forewing divided longitudinally by a pale streak, subbasal band of the hindwing present on the upperside.
- Eurytides agesilaus montanum (Küppers, 1974) (northern Peru)
- Eurytides agesilaus viridis (Röber, 1926) (northern Bolivia, Brazil, Paraguay)

== Status ==
Eurytides agesilaus is common and not threatened.

== Etymology ==
It is named in the classical tradition. Agesilaus was an ancient Greek king.
