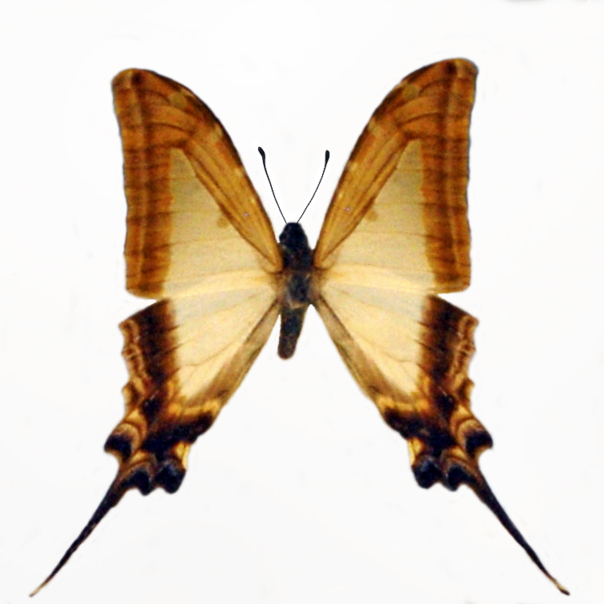
- Mounted specimen

Scientific classification
- Kingdom: Animalia
- Phylum: Arthropoda
- Class: Insecta
- Order: Lepidoptera
- Family: Papilionidae
- Genus: Eurytides
- Species: E. leucaspis

Binomial name
- Eurytides leucaspis (Godart, 1819)

Synonyms
- Papilio leucaspis Godart, 1819; Papilio leucaspis lamis Rothschild & Jordan, 1906 (preocc. Cramer, 1779); Protographium leucaspis (Godart, 1819)

= Eurytides leucaspis =

Species of butterfly

Eurytides leucaspis is a species of butterfly found in the Neotropical realm.

== Taxonomy ==
There are two subspecies recognised:

- E. l. leucaspis - northern Colombia, eastern Ecuador, northern Peru, Bolivia
- E. l. lamidis Brown & Lamas, 1994 - western Venezuela (Tachira), Colombia

== Description ==
Eurytides leucaspis can reach a wingspan of almost 10 cm (3.9 in). These large butterflies have a frons entirely brownish black. The abdomen is yellowish beneath. The wings have a common triangular green-yellow area, and a brown marginal area with blackish hues parallel to the margin.

lamis R.& J. The posterior cell-spots of the forewing is large, very distinct also beneath.

leucaspis Godt. The cell-spots of the forewing is smaller, usually only indicated beneath, the two outer posterior cell-spots arte more widely separated from one another.

== Distribution ==
This species is present in Colombia, eastern Ecuador, northern Peru, Bolivia and western Venezuela.

== Status ==
Common and not threatened.
