= Guatteria punctata =

Conservation status
- Least Concern (IUCN 3.1)

Scientific classification
- Kingdom: Plantae
- Clade: Embryophytes
- Clade: Tracheophytes
- Clade: Spermatophytes
- Clade: Angiosperms
- Clade: Magnoliids
- Order: Magnoliales
- Family: Annonaceae
- Genus: Guatteria
- Species: G. punctata

Binomial name
- Guatteria punctata (Aubl.) R.A.Howard

Synonyms
- Synonymy: Annona axilliflora DC.; Annona chrysopetala Steud.; Annona punctata Aubl.; Guatteria acutissima R.E.Fr.; Guatteria asplundiana R.E.Fr.; Guatteria atra Sandwith; Guatteria axilliflora (DC.) R.E.Fr.; Guatteria buchtienii R.E.Fr.; Guatteria calimensis R.E.Fr.; Guatteria calliantha R.E.Fr.; Guatteria caniflora Mart.; Guatteria caniflora var. angustifolia Mart.; Guatteria caniflora var. latifolia Mart.; Guatteria cargadero Triana & Planch.; Guatteria chrysopetala (Steud.) Miq.; Guatteria chrysopetala var. major R.E.Fr.; Guatteria chrysopetala var. tenuipes R.E.Fr.; Guatteria coeloneura Diels; Guatteria collina R.E.Fr.; Guatteria elliptica R.E.Fr.; Guatteria gamosepala R.E.Fr.; Guatteria glauca Ruiz & Pav.; Guatteria gracilipes R.E.Fr.; Guatteria guentheri Diels; Guatteria juninensis R.E.Fr.; Guatteria lanceolata R.E.Fr.; Guatteria lasiocalyx R.E.Fr.; Guatteria latipetala R.E.Fr.; Guatteria leiocarpa R.E.Fr.; Guatteria longestipitata R.E.Fr.; Guatteria macrocalyx R.E.Fr.; Guatteria obliqua R.E.Fr.; Guatteria occidentalis R.E.Fr.; Guatteria olivacea R.E.Fr.; Guatteria ovalifolia R.E.Fr.; Guatteria parviflora R.E.Fr.; Guatteria platyphylla Triana & Planch.; Guatteria pleiocarpa Diels; Guatteria poeppigiana Mart.; Guatteria pteropus Benth.; Guatteria pteropus var. angustior R.E.Fr.; Guatteria pteropus var. cinerea R.E.Fr.; Guatteria rhamnoides R.E.Fr.; Guatteria sagotiana R.E.Fr.; Guatteria sagotiana var. gracilior R.E.Fr.; Guatteria sylvicola S.Moore; Guatteria umbonata R.E.Fr.; Guatteria wessels-boerii Jans.-Jac.

Species of plant

Guatteria punctata is a species of flowering plant in the Annonaceae family. It is a shrub or tree native to tropical South America, ranging from Colombia and Venezuela to the Guianas, northern and west-central Brazil, Ecuador, Peru, and Bolivia.
