= Guatteria chiriquiensis =

Conservation status
- Least Concern (IUCN 3.1)

Scientific classification
- Kingdom: Plantae
- Clade: Embryophytes
- Clade: Tracheophytes
- Clade: Spermatophytes
- Clade: Angiosperms
- Clade: Magnoliids
- Order: Magnoliales
- Family: Annonaceae
- Genus: Guatteria
- Species: G. chiriquiensis

Binomial name
- Guatteria chiriquiensis R.E.Fr.

Species of flowering plant

Guatteria chiriquensis is a tree species belonging to the Annonaceae family. It ranges from the central and southern Pacific slopes of Costa Rica to western Panama.
