= Guatteria pastazae =

Conservation status
- Least Concern (IUCN 3.1)

Scientific classification
- Kingdom: Plantae
- Clade: Embryophytes
- Clade: Tracheophytes
- Clade: Spermatophytes
- Clade: Angiosperms
- Clade: Magnoliids
- Order: Magnoliales
- Family: Annonaceae
- Genus: Guatteria
- Species: G. pastazae

Binomial name
- Guatteria pastazae R.E.Fr.

Species of flowering plant

Guatteria pastazae is a species of flowering plant in the family Annonaceae. It is a tree native to northern Brazil, Ecuador, and northern Peru.
