= Guatteria ramiflora =

Conservation status
- Least Concern (IUCN 3.1)

Scientific classification
- Kingdom: Plantae
- Clade: Embryophytes
- Clade: Tracheophytes
- Clade: Spermatophytes
- Clade: Angiosperms
- Clade: Magnoliids
- Order: Magnoliales
- Family: Annonaceae
- Genus: Guatteria
- Species: G. ramiflora

Binomial name
- Guatteria ramiflora (D.R.Simpson) Erkens & Maas

Synonyms
- Guatteriopsis ramiflora D.R.Simpson

Species of plant

Guatteria ramiflora is a species of flowering plant in the Annonaceae family. It is a tree native to Colombia, Ecuador, Peru, and northwestern Brazil.
