= Guatteria panamensis =

Conservation status
- Least Concern (IUCN 3.1)

Scientific classification
- Kingdom: Plantae
- Clade: Embryophytes
- Clade: Tracheophytes
- Clade: Spermatophytes
- Clade: Angiosperms
- Clade: Magnoliids
- Order: Magnoliales
- Family: Annonaceae
- Genus: Guatteria
- Species: G. panamensis

Binomial name
- Guatteria panamensis R.E.Fr.

Synonyms
- Guatteria costaricensis subsp. panamensis R.E.Fr.

Species of flowering plant

Guatteria panamensis is a species of flowering plant belonging to the Annonaceae family. It is a tree native to Costa Rica and Panama. It is threatened by habitat loss.
