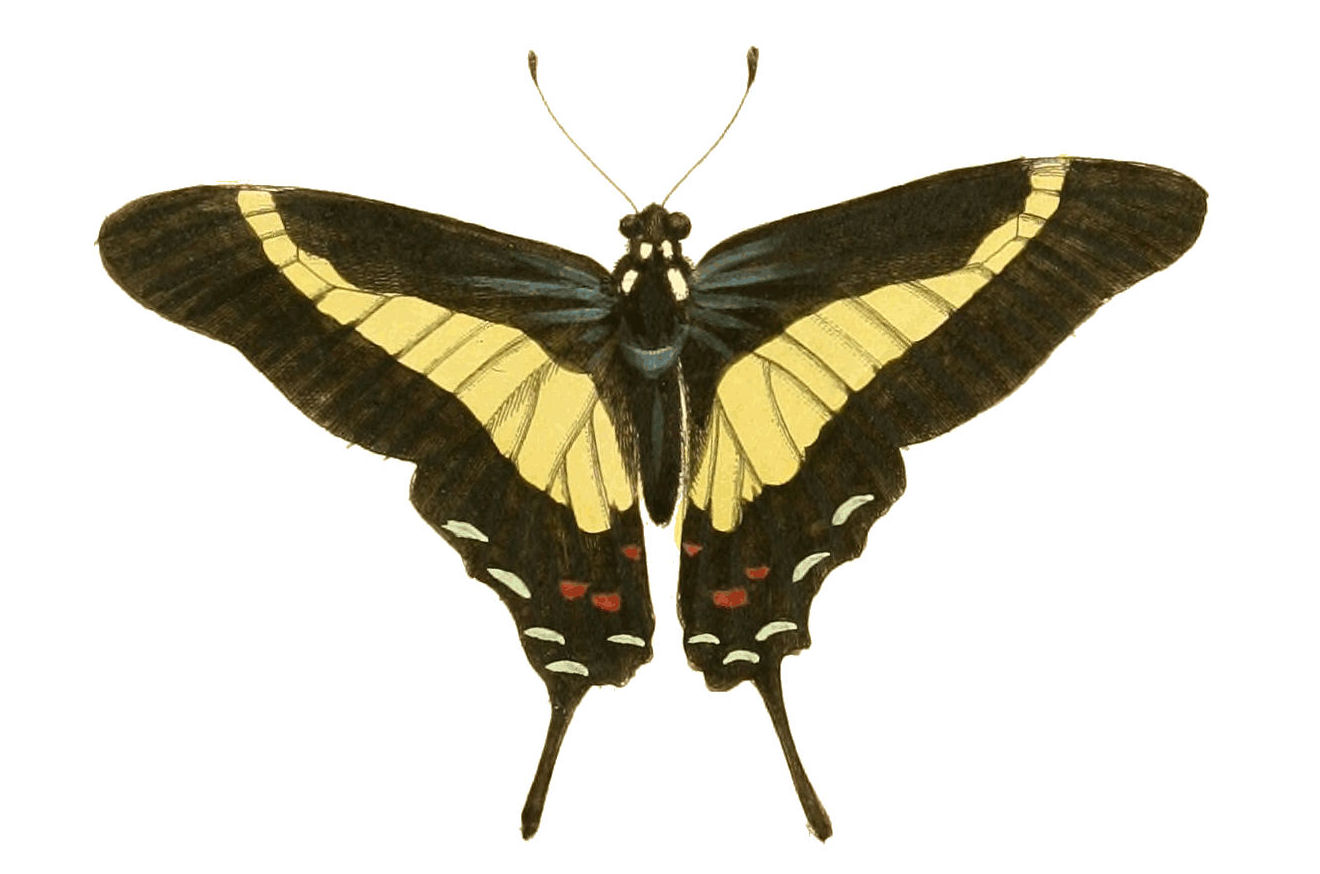
- Illustration by Dru Drury

Scientific classification
- Kingdom: Animalia
- Phylum: Arthropoda
- Class: Insecta
- Order: Lepidoptera
- Family: Papilionidae
- Genus: Eurytides
- Species: E. asius

Binomial name
- Eurytides asius (Fabricius, 1781)

Synonyms
- Papilio asius Fabricius, 1781; Papilio astyagas Drury, 1782; Papilio manlius Perty, [1833]; Papilio asius f. albofasciatus Zikán, 1937; Protographium asius (Fabricius, 1781)

= Eurytides asius =

Species of butterfly

Eurytides asius is a species of butterfly in the family Papilionidae. It is found in the Neotropical realm in southeastern Brazil (Bahia, Minas Gerais, Espirito Santo, Rio de Janeiro, São Paulo, Paraná, Santa Catarina, Rio Grande do Sul), and Paraguay.

== Etymology ==
The specific name is named in the classical tradition for Asius son of Hyrtacus who was the leader of the Trojan allies, the Equites Trojani of Carl Linnaeus.

== Description ==
Upperside: Antennae, thorax, and abdomen black. Wings raven black, having a pale yellow bar rising at the anterior edges near the tips of the superior wings, and crossing these and the inferior ones, meeting even with the abdomen, becoming wider gradually. Posterior wings furnished with two tails, and along the external edges having four small yellow crescents, and another at the abdominal corners; above which are two long square red spots, and another yellow crescent on the abdominal edges. Underside: Palpi, legs, and breast black. Abdomen black, with a white longitudinal stripe on each side. Wings marked nearly as on the upperside; the posterior having several red spots and streaks more than on the upper side, and placed next the body from the shoulders to the abdominal corners. Wingspan 3 inches (76 mm).

== Biology ==
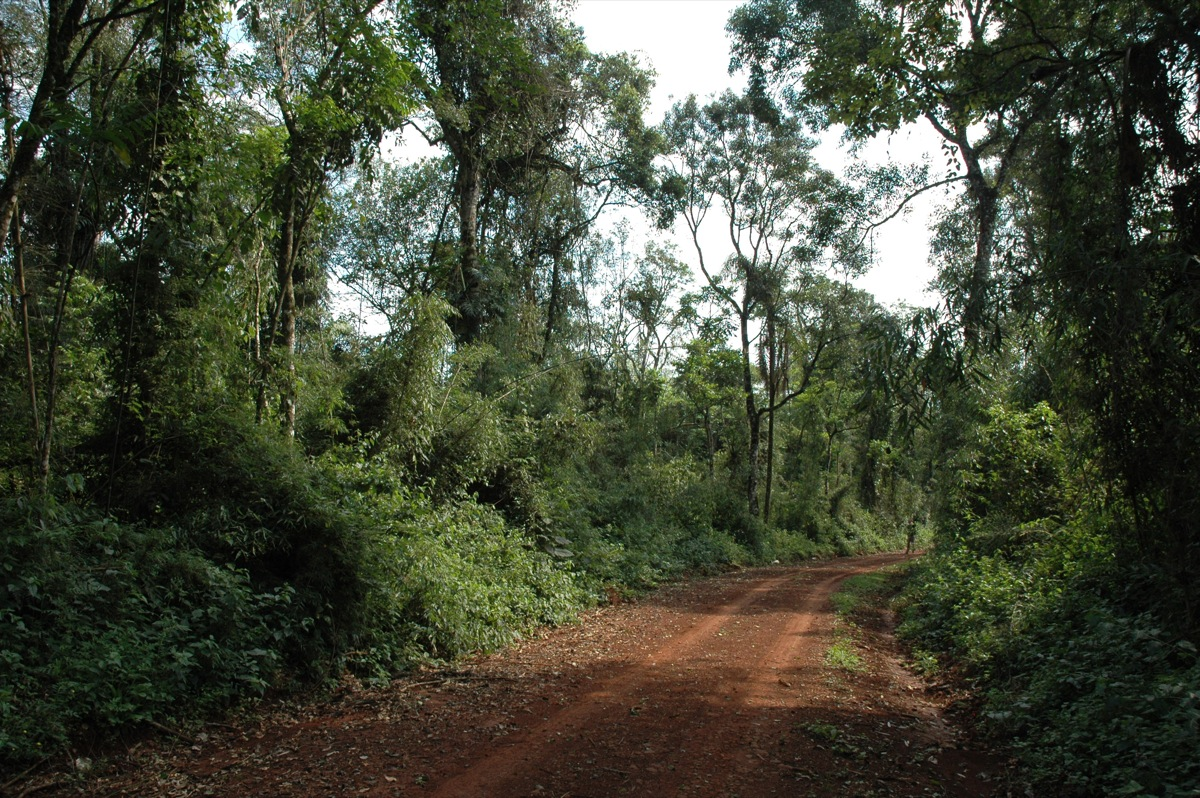
Forest habitat - Parque Estadual do Turvo

The larva feeds on Annona cacans.
