= Guatteria scytophylla =

Conservation status
- Least Concern (IUCN 3.1)

Scientific classification
- Kingdom: Plantae
- Clade: Embryophytes
- Clade: Tracheophytes
- Clade: Spermatophytes
- Clade: Angiosperms
- Clade: Magnoliids
- Order: Magnoliales
- Family: Annonaceae
- Genus: Guatteria
- Species: G. scytophylla

Binomial name
- Guatteria scytophylla Diels

Synonyms
- Guatteria hyposericea Diels; Guatteria insignis R.E.Fr.; Guatteria krukoffii R.E.Fr.; Guatteria micans R.E.Fr.

Species of flowering plant

Guatteria scytophylla is a species of flowering plant in the Annonaceae family. It is a tree native to Bolivia, northern and west-central Brazil, Colombia, French Guiana, Guyana, Peru, and Venezuela.
