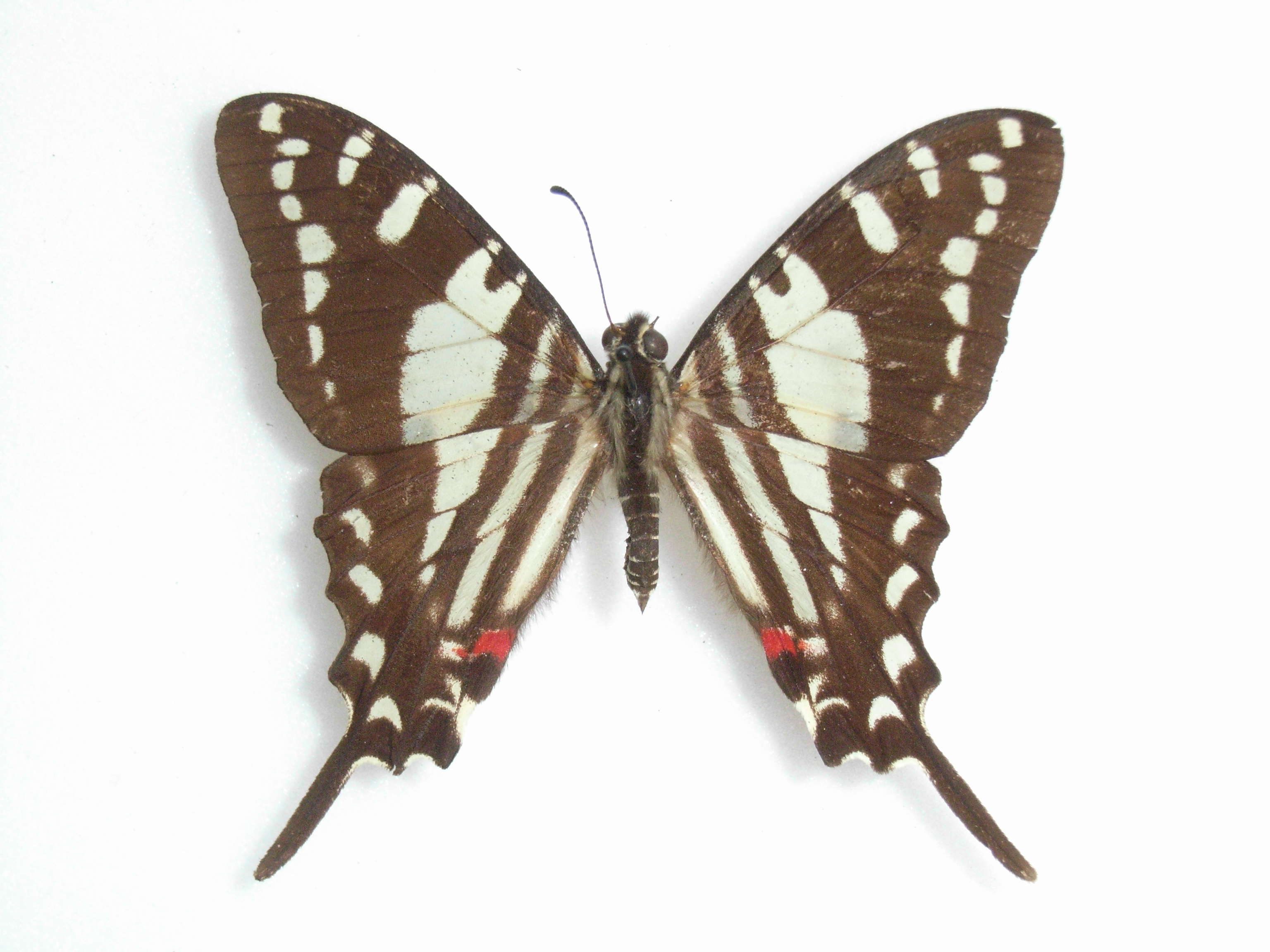

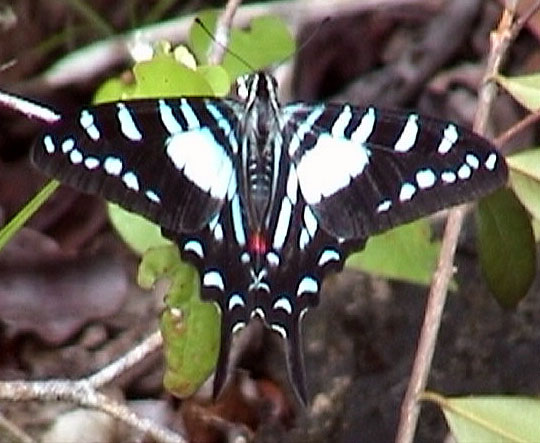

Conservation status
- Least Concern (IUCN 3.1)

Scientific classification
- Kingdom: Animalia
- Phylum: Arthropoda
- Class: Insecta
- Order: Lepidoptera
- Family: Papilionidae
- Genus: Eurytides
- Species: E. celadon

Binomial name
- Eurytides celadon (H. Lucas, 1852)

Synonyms
- Papilio celadon H. Lucas, 1852; Protographium celadon (H. Lucas, 1852); Neographium celadon

= Eurytides celadon =

Species of butterfly

Eurytides celadon, the Cuban kite swallowtail or celadon swallowtail, is a species of butterfly in the family Papilionidae. It is endemic to Cuba. Occasional strays can be found on the Florida Keys.

The wingspan is 66–85 mm. Adults are on wing from July to October in two generations. Its host plant is believed to be Nectandra coriacea.
