= Eurytides columbus =

- Eurytides columbus and related species in Adalbert Seitz's Fauna Americana

Scientific classification
- Kingdom: Animalia
- Phylum: Arthropoda
- Clade: Pancrustacea
- Class: Insecta
- Order: Lepidoptera
- Family: Papilionidae
- Genus: Eurytides
- Species: E. columbus

Binomial name
- Eurytides columbus (Kollar, 1850)

Synonyms
- Papilio columbus Kollar, 1850; Papilio hippodamus Doubleday, [1845]; Papilio hippodamus C. & R. Felder, 1864; Papilio burtoni Reakirt, 1868; Papilio hippodamus var. fulva Oberthür, 1879

Species of butterfly

Eurytides columbus is a species of butterfly found only in Colombia (Muzo, Bogotá, Cali, Rio Calima, Rio Bravo) and northwest Ecuador (Rio Lita, Rio Llurimagua, Rio Mira).

Very nearly allied to Eurytides serville (Godart, 1824) the narrow green costal band of the forewing more oblique than in E. serville, marginal area of the forewing beneath more purplish white, the blackish lines in it and the yellowish streak on the underside of the abdominal fold of the hindwing less distinct than in E. serville; the black distal area of the hindwing sometimes touches the cell, but does not enter it. Specimens with yellowish instead of deep red anal spot are ab. fulva Oberthur. Female similar to the male. Cordillera of Bogota to the west coast of Colombia, north-west Ecuador.

== Status ==
No known threats

== Taxonomy ==
Possibly conspecific with E. serville.
