= Guatteria dolichopoda =

Conservation status
- Least Concern (IUCN 3.1)

Scientific classification
- Kingdom: Plantae
- Clade: Embryophytes
- Clade: Tracheophytes
- Clade: Spermatophytes
- Clade: Angiosperms
- Clade: Magnoliids
- Order: Magnoliales
- Family: Annonaceae
- Genus: Guatteria
- Species: G. dolichopoda

Binomial name
- Guatteria dolichopoda Donn.Sm.

Synonyms
- Guatteria dolichopoda var. microsperma R.E.Fr.; Guatteria rigidipes R.E.Fr.; Guatteria tonduzii Diels; Guatteria tonduzii var. leptopus R.E.Fr.

Species of flowering plant

Guatteria dolichopoda is a species of flowering plant in the Annonaceae family. It is a tree native to Chiapas, Colombia, Costa Rica, Honduras, Nicaragua, and Panama. It is threatened by habitat loss.
