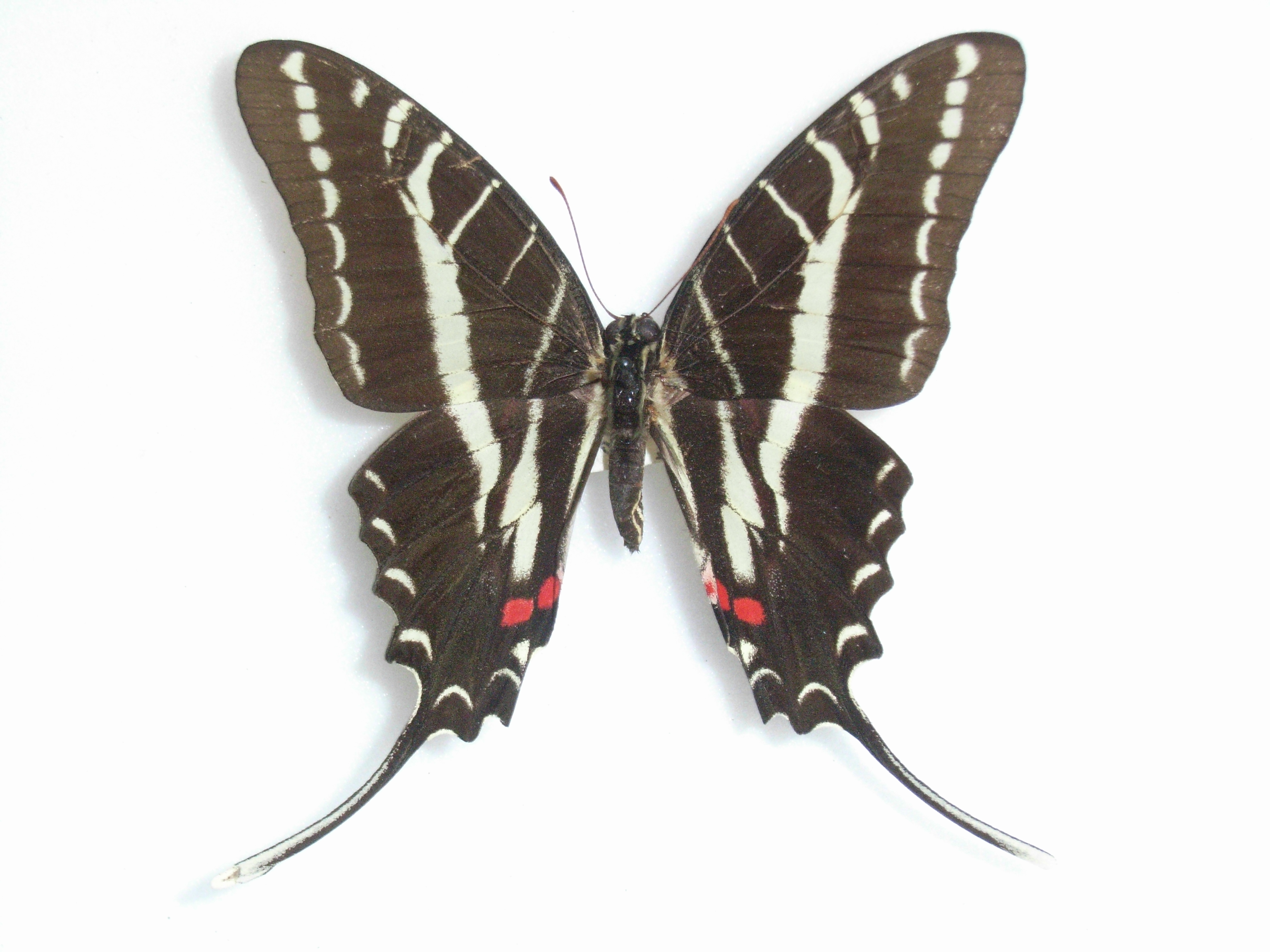

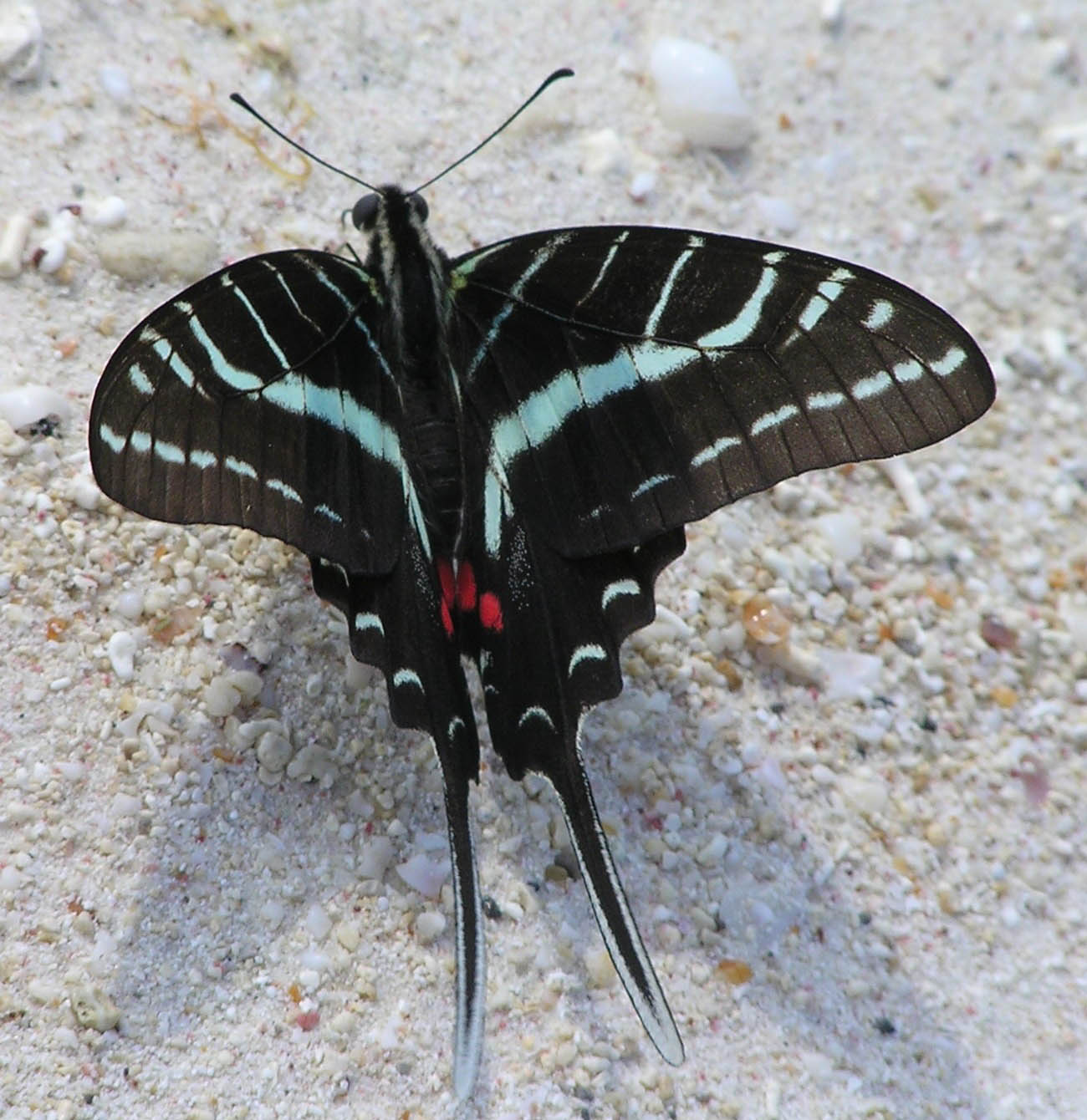

Scientific classification
- Kingdom: Animalia
- Phylum: Arthropoda
- Clade: Pancrustacea
- Class: Insecta
- Order: Lepidoptera
- Family: Papilionidae
- Genus: Eurytides
- Species: E. philolaus

Binomial name
- Eurytides philolaus (Boisduval, 1836)

Synonyms
- Papilio philolaus Boisduval, 1836; Graphium philolaus; Protographium philolaus; Neographium philolaus; Papilio philolaus ajax Eimer, 1889 (preocc. Linnaeus, 1758); Papilio philolaus nigrescens Eimer, 1889; Papilio philolaus f. niger Eimer, 1889; Papilio philolaus ab. felicis Fruhstorfer, 1904; Eurytides philolaus f. vazquezae Beutelspacher, 1976; Papilio xanticles Bates, 1863; Papilio plaesiolaus Staudinger, 1884; Papilio xanticles var. phileonra Haase, 1892; Papilio xanticles f. scheba Rothschild & Jordan, 1906; Eurytides xanticles; Neographium xanticles

= Eurytides philolaus =

Species of butterfly

Eurytides philolaus, the dark zebra swallowtail or dark kite-swallowtail, is a butterfly of the family Papilionidae. It is found from southern Texas to northern South America.

The wingspan is 90–95 mm.

"Antenna black; the 7. pale green band of the forewing only represented by a spot; hindwing with 2 red spots posteriorly; on the under surface the red line of the hindwing edged with black at both sides, undulate anteriorly. Scent-scales of the male short, broad, irregular, produced in a number of filaments. The female is in 2 forms: female f. philolaus Boisd. similar to the male, the underside paler, female f. niger Eimer (nigrescens Eimer; felicis Fruhst.) the pale green bands of the membrane of the wings scaled with black, the wings therefore black with slight traces of the bands."

== Biology ==
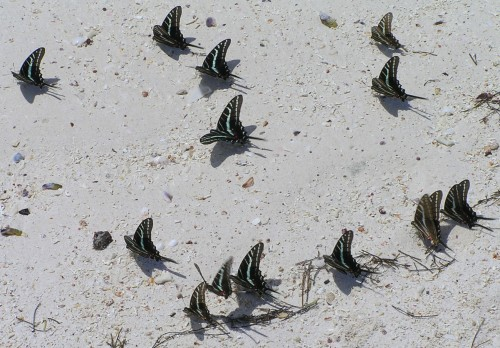

The butterfly is found in low situations, often resting in crowds on the sand at the edge of rivers. The larvae feed on Annonaceae species.

== Subspecies ==
There are two recognised subspecies:

- Eurytides philolaus philolaus (Mexico, Honduras, Costa Rica, southern Texas)
- Eurytides philolaus xanticles (Bates, 1863) (Panama, northern Colombia, northern Venezuela)
