= Guatteria ferruginea =

Conservation status
- Least Concern (IUCN 3.1)

Scientific classification
- Kingdom: Plantae
- Clade: Embryophytes
- Clade: Tracheophytes
- Clade: Spermatophytes
- Clade: Angiosperms
- Clade: Magnoliids
- Order: Magnoliales
- Family: Annonaceae
- Genus: Guatteria
- Species: G. ferruginea

Binomial name
- Guatteria ferruginea A.St.-Hil.

Species of flowering plant

Guatteria ferruginea is a species of plant in the Annonaceae family that grows across South America from Suriname and French Guiana to the Atlantic Forest of Brazil.
