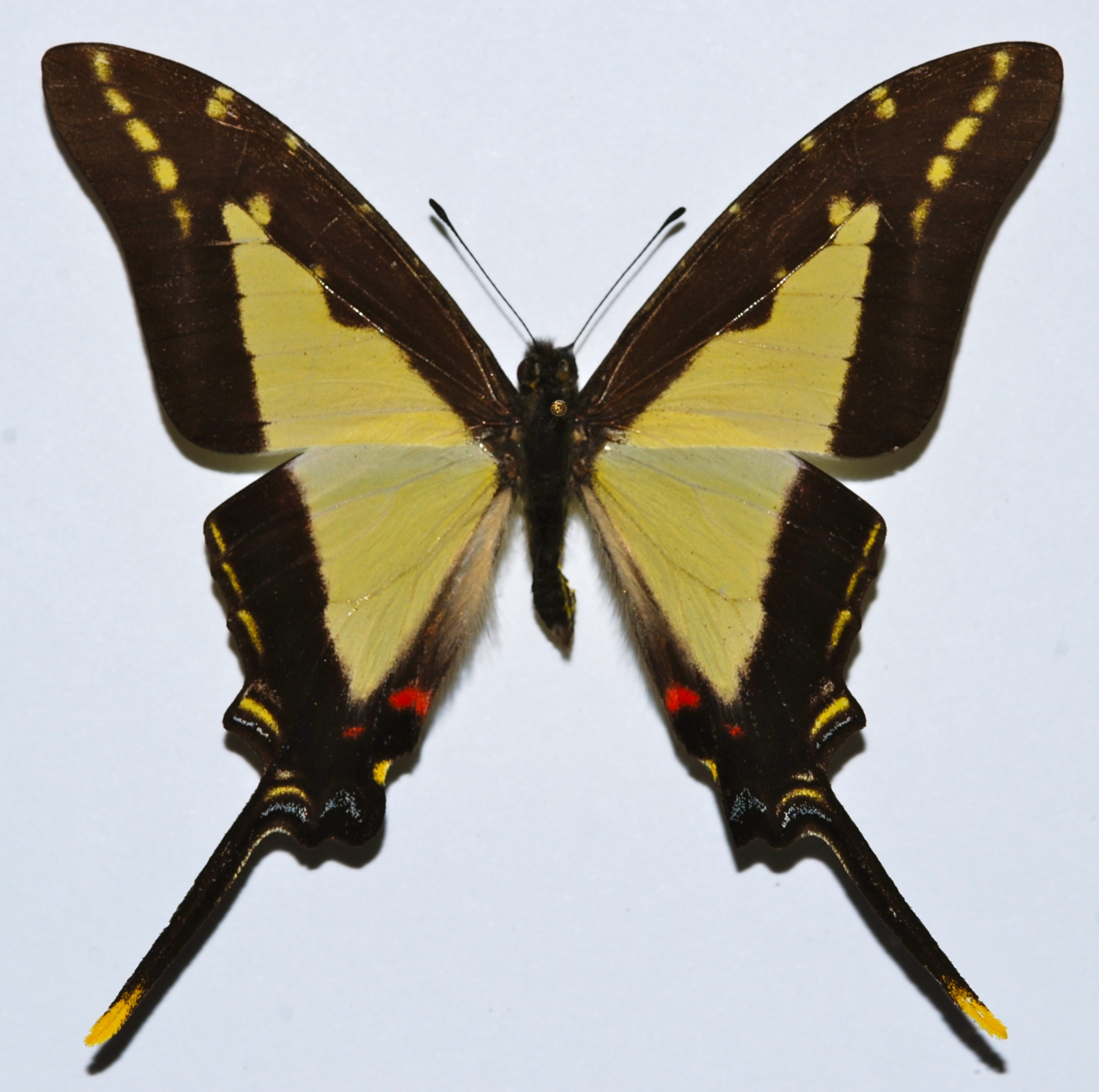

Scientific classification
- Kingdom: Animalia
- Phylum: Arthropoda
- Class: Insecta
- Order: Lepidoptera
- Family: Papilionidae
- Genus: Eurytides
- Species: E. dioxippus

Binomial name
- Eurytides dioxippus (Hewitson, [1856])

Synonyms
- List: Papilio dioxippus Hewitson, 1856; Papilio (Cosmodesmus) ab. drueti Dufrane, 1946; Eurytides dioxippus marae Racheli, Bollino & Sala, 1990; Papilio lacandones diores Rothschild & Jordan, 1906; Papilio pausanias Fruhstorfer, 1938 (preocc. Hewitson, 1852); Papilio lacandones Bates, 1864; Protographium dioxippus (Hewitson, 1856)

= Eurytides dioxippus =

Species of butterfly

Eurytides dioxippus is a species of butterfly found in the Neotropical realm.

== Subspecies ==
- E. d. dioxippus - Panama to Colombia
- E. d. marae (Racheli, Bollino & Sala, 1990) - south-western Venezuela: Tachira, Barinas
- E. d. diores (Rothschild & Jordan, 1906) - Colombia, Ecuador: Napo, Peru, Bolivia: Mapiri
- E. d. lacandones (Bates, 1864), the thick-border kite swallowtail - south-western Mexico: Veracruz, eastern Chiapas, Guatemala to Costa Rica, western Panama. Often sold to collectors.

== Description ==
Wings on the upper surface with common green-yellow triangular area; forewing with vestiges of costal bands; hindwing with 2 red spots at the anal angle. Very common in Bogota-collections; Valleys of the Gauca, Magdalena and Meta Rivers, at moderate elevations.

== Status ==
Restricted range but common and not threatened
