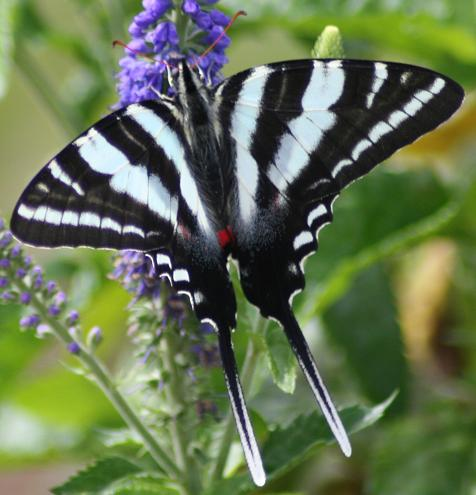
- Eurytides marcellus

Scientific classification
- Kingdom: Animalia
- Phylum: Arthropoda
- Clade: Pancrustacea
- Class: Insecta
- Order: Lepidoptera
- Family: Papilionidae
- Tribe: Leptocircini
- Genus: Eurytides; Hübner, [1821]

Synonyms
- Asiographium Möhn, 2002. Type-species: Papilio asius Fabricius, 1781; Bellerographium Möhn, 2002. Type species: Eurytides bellerophon (Dalman, 1823); Eurygraphium Möhn, 2002. Type-species: Papilio thyastes Drury, 1782; Neographium Möhn, 2002. Type species: Neographium philolaus (Boisduval, 1836)

= Eurytides =

Genus of butterflies

Eurytides is a genus of butterflies in the family Papilionidae, found in North, Central, and South America. Members of this genus are commonly known as kite swallowtails.

== Species ==
The following species are recognised in the genus Eurytides:

Subgenus Bellerographium Möhn, 2002

- Eurytides bellerophon (Dahlman, 1823)

Subgenus Eurytides

- Eurytides salvini (Bates, 1864) – Salvin's kite swallowtail
- Eurytides columbus (Kollar, 1850)
- Eurytides orabilis (Butler, 1872) – thick-edged kite swallowtail
- Eurytides serville (Godart, 1824) – Serville swordtail
- Eurytides callias (Rothschild & Jordan, 1906) – Callias kite swallowtail
- Eurytides dolicaon (Cramer, [1776]) – dolicaon kite swallowtail
- Eurytides iphitas Hübner, [1821] – yellow kite swallowtail

Subgenus Neographium Möhn, 2002:

- Eurytides thyastes Drury, 1782) - Brazil
- Eurytides calliste (H. Bates, 1864), Yellow kite-swallowtail - Guatemala
- Eurytides dioxippus (Hewitson, [1856]), thick-bordered kite-swallowtail - Colombia
- Eurytides leucaspis (Godart, 1819) - Peru?
- Eurytides epidaus (E. Doubleday, 1846), Mexican kite-swallowtail - Mexico (Yucatan); Honduras
- Eurytides agesilaus (Guérin-Méneville & Percheron, 1835) - Mexico to Bolivia & Paraguay
- Eurytides × oberthueri Rothschild & Jordan, 1906 - Mexico, Honduras Theoretically a natural hydrid between E. agesilaus and E. philolaus.
- Eurytides philolaus (Boisduval, 1836) – dark kite swallowtail - Texas, USA & northern Mexico to Colombia & Venezuela
- Eurytides zonaria (A. Butler, 1869), Hispaniolan kite-swallowtail - Hispaniola
- Eurytides anaxilaus (C. Felder & R. Felder, 1865), small kite-swallowtail - Panama, northern Colombia, N Venezuela
- Eurytides celadon (Lucas, 1852), Cuban kite-swallowtail - Cuba & Isla de Juventud
- Eurytides marcellinus (E. Doubleday, [1845]), Jamaican kite-swallowtail - Jamaica
- Eurytides asius (Fabricius, 1781) - South America

Subgenus Boreographium Grishin, 2021

- Eurytides marcellus (Cramer, 1777), Zebra swallowtail - eastern USA & Canada

Some species have been moved to genus Mimoides.
