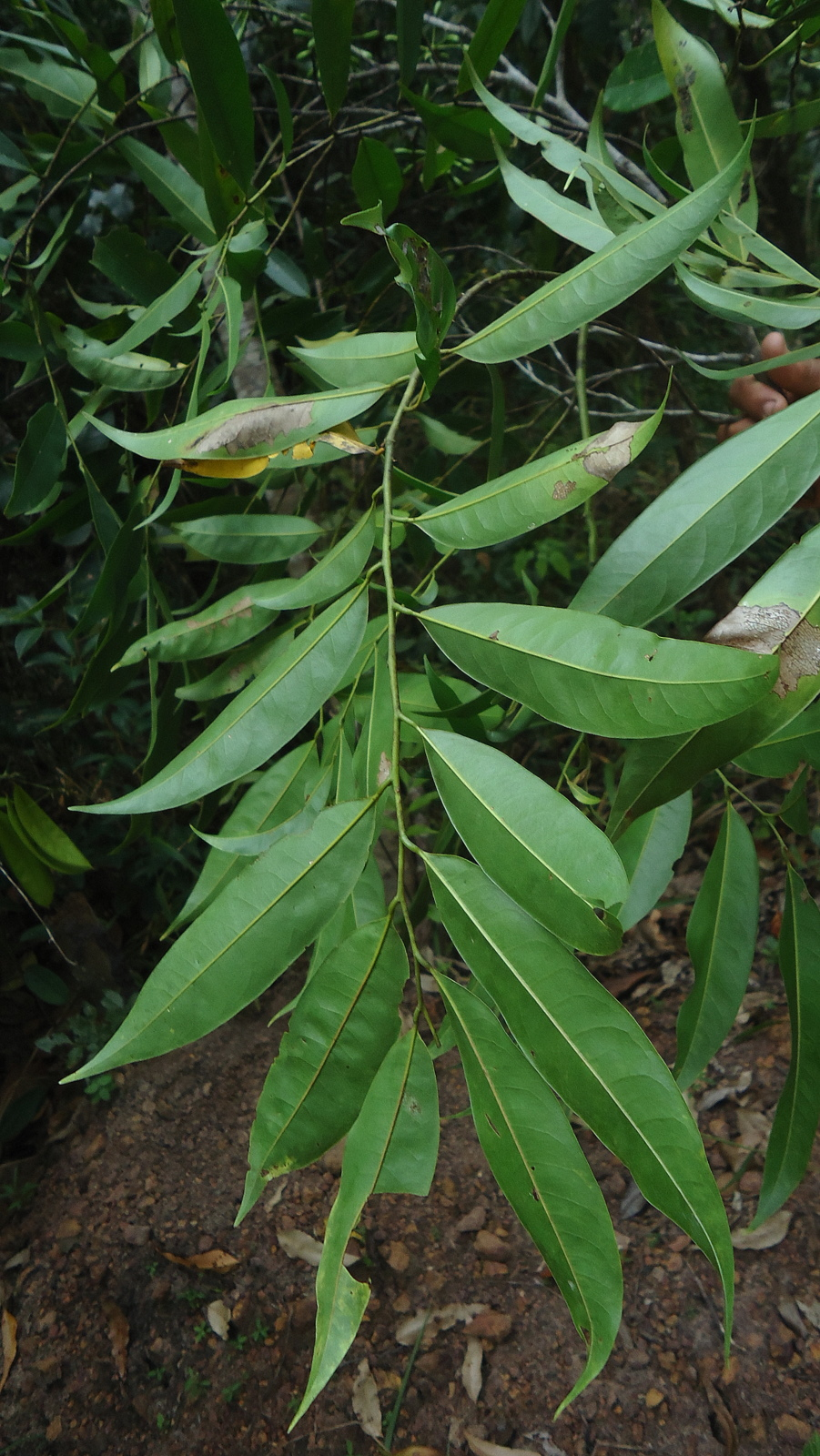
- Guatteria australis

Scientific classification
- Kingdom: Plantae
- Clade: Embryophytes
- Clade: Tracheophytes
- Clade: Spermatophytes
- Clade: Angiosperms
- Clade: Magnoliids
- Order: Magnoliales
- Family: Annonaceae
- Subfamily: Annonoideae
- Genus: Guatteria; Ruiz & Pav.

Synonyms
- Aberemoa Aubl.; Cananga Aubl.; Guatteriella R.E.Fr.; Guatteriopsis R.E.Fr.; Heteropetalum Benth.

= Guatteria =

Genus of trees

Guatteria is a genus of Central and South American flowering plants in the family Annonaceae. It is the largest genus in the family in South America, and the dominant genus in mature tropical forest. The fruits are berries, borne in clusters on short stalks.

== Species ==
186 species are accepted.

- Guatteria aberrans Erkens & Maas
- Guatteria acrantha Erkens & Maas
- Guatteria aeruginosa Standl.
- Guatteria alata Maas & Setten
- Guatteria alba Maas & Westra
- Guatteria aliciae Maas & Erkens
- Guatteria allenii R.E.Fr.
- Guatteria alta R.E.Fr.
- Guatteria alticola Scharf & Maas
- Guatteria amapaensis Maas & Westra
- Guatteria amplifolia Triana & Planch.
- Guatteria anteridifera Scharf & Maas
- Guatteria antioquensis Maas & Westra
- Guatteria araracuarae Maas & Westra
- Guatteria arenicola Maas & Erkens
- Guatteria argentea Erkens & Maas
- Guatteria atabapensis Aristeg. ex D.M.Johnson & N.A.Murray
- Guatteria attenuata Maas & Westra
- Guatteria australis A.St.-Hil.
- Guatteria auyantepuiensis Maas & Westra
- Guatteria ayangannae Scharf & Maas
- Guatteria beckii Maas & Westra
- Guatteria beniensis Maas & Westra
- Guatteria bernardii R.E.Fr.
- Guatteria blainii (Griseb.) Urb.
- Guatteria blepharophylla Mart.
- Guatteria brevipetiolata Maas & Westra
- Guatteria campestris R.E.Fr.
- Guatteria campinensis (Morawetz & Maas) Erkens & Maas
- Guatteria candolleana Schltdl.
- Guatteria capixabae Lobão & J.C.Lopes
- Guatteria carchiana Maas & Westra
- Guatteria caribaea Urb.
- Guatteria castilloi Maas & Westra
- Guatteria chasmantha R.E.Fr.
- Guatteria chiriquiensis R.E.Fr.
- Guatteria choroniensis Tamayo
- Guatteria chrysophylla Maas & Setten
- Guatteria cinnamomea D.R.Simpson
- Guatteria citriodora Ducke
- Guatteria clusiifolia D.M.Johnson & N.A.Murray
- Guatteria confusa Maas & Westra
- Guatteria conspicua R.E.Fr.
- Guatteria costaricensis R.E.Fr.
- Guatteria crassipes R.E.Fr.
- Guatteria crassivenia N.Zamora & Maas
- Guatteria cryandra Erkens & Maas
- Guatteria cuatrecasasii D.Sánchez
- Guatteria cuscoensis Maas & Westra
- Guatteria darienensis Susana Arias & Maas
- Guatteria decurrens R.E.Fr.
- Guatteria delicatula Maas & Westra
- Guatteria denudata R.E.Fr.
- Guatteria discolor R.E.Fr.
- Guatteria dolichophylla R.E.Fr.
- Guatteria dolichopoda Donn.Sm.
- Guatteria dotana N.Zamora & Erkens
- Guatteria duckeana R.E.Fr.
- Guatteria duodecima Maas & Westra
- Guatteria dura R.E.Fr.
- Guatteria elata R.E.Fr.
- Guatteria elegans Scharf
- Guatteria elegantissima R.E.Fr.
- Guatteria elongata Benth.
- Guatteria emarginata Lobão, Maas & Mello-Silva
- Guatteria eriopoda DC.
- Guatteria esmeraldae Maas & Westra
- Guatteria esperanzae Couvreur, J.N.Zapata & Loor
- Guatteria eugeniifolia A.DC. ex R.E.Fr.
- Guatteria ferruginea A. St. Hil.
- Guatteria flabellata Erkens & Maas
- Guatteria flagelliflora Maas & Westra
- Guatteria flexilis R.E.Fr.
- Guatteria foliosa Benth.
- Guatteria fractiflexa Maas & Westra
- Guatteria friesiana (W.A.Rodrigues) Erkens & Maas
- Guatteria galeottiana Baill.
- Guatteria gentryi Maas & Erkens
- Guatteria goudotiana Triana & Planch.
- Guatteria grandiflora Donn.Sm.
- Guatteria grandipes Maas & Westra
- Guatteria griseifolia Maas & Westra
- Guatteria guianensis (Aubl.) R.E.Fr.
- Guatteria herrerana N.Zamora & Maas
- Guatteria heteropetala Benth.
- Guatteria hirsuta Ruiz & Pav.
- Guatteria hispida (R.E.Fr.) Erkens & Maas
- Guatteria insculpta R.E.Fr.
- Guatteria intermedia Scharf
- Guatteria inundata Mart.
- Guatteria japurensis Maas & Westra
- Guatteria jefensis Barringer
- Guatteria kamakusensis Maas & Westra
- Guatteria latifolia (Mart.) R.E.Fr.
- Guatteria leucotricha Scharf & Maas
- Guatteria liesneri D.M. Johnson & N.A. Murray
- Guatteria longicuspis R.E.Fr.
- Guatteria lucens Standl.
- Guatteria macropus Mart.
- Guatteria maguirei R.E.Fr.
- Guatteria maypurensis Kunth
- Guatteria megalocarpa Maas & Westra
- Guatteria megalophylla Diels
- Guatteria meliodora R.E.Fr.
- Guatteria microcarpa Ruiz & Pav. ex G. Don
- Guatteria minutiflora Scharf & Maas
- Guatteria modesta Diels
- Guatteria monticola R.E.Fr.
- Guatteria myriocarpa R.E.Fr.
- Guatteria narinensis Maas & Westra
- Guatteria notabilis Mello-Silva & Pirani
- Guatteria novogranatensis R.E.Fr.
- Guatteria oblonga R.E.Fr.
- Guatteria oblongifolia Rusby
- Guatteria odorata R.E.Fr.
- Guatteria oligocarpa Mart.
- Guatteria oliviformis Donn.Sm.
- Guatteria oriximinae Maas & Westra
- Guatteria ouregou (Aubl.) Dunal
- Guatteria pachycarpa Erkens & N.Zamora
- Guatteria pachyphylla Maas & Westra
- Guatteria pacifica R.E.Fr.
- Guatteria pakaraimae Scharf & Maas
- Guatteria paludosa R.E.Fr.
- Guatteria panamensis R.E. Fries
- Guatteria pannosa Scharf & Maas
- Guatteria partangensis Scharf & Maas
- Guatteria pastazae R.E.Fr.
- Guatteria peruviana R.E.Fr.
- Guatteria pichinchae Maas & Westra
- Guatteria pittieri R.E.Fr.
- Guatteria pogonopus Martius
- Guatteria pohliana Schltdl.
- Guatteria polyantha R.E.Fr.
- Guatteria procera R.E.Fr.
- Guatteria pseudoferruginea Maas & Westra
- Guatteria pseudorotundata Maas & Erkens
- Guatteria pudica N.Zamora & Maas
- Guatteria punctata (Aubl.) R.A.Howard
- Guatteria ramiflora (D.R.Simpson) Erkens & Maas
- Guatteria reinaldii Erkens & Maas
- Guatteria revoluta Maas & Westra
- Guatteria richardii R.E.Fr.
- Guatteria rigida R.E.Fr.
- Guatteria rostrata Erkens & Maas
- Guatteria rotundata Maas & Setten
- Guatteria rubiginosa N.Zamora & Maas
- Guatteria ruboides Maas & Westra
- Guatteria rubrinervis R.E.Fr.
- Guatteria rufotomentosa R.E.Fr.
- Guatteria rupestris Mello-Silva & Pirani
- Guatteria sabuletorum R.E.Fr.
- Guatteria saffordiana Pittier
- Guatteria sanjorgensis Villanueva & Parra-Lizc.
- Guatteria scalarinervia D.R.Simpson
- Guatteria scandens Ducke
- Guatteria schomburgkiana Mart.
- Guatteria scytophylla Diels
- Guatteria sellowiana Schltdl.
- Guatteria sessilicarpa Maas & Setten
- Guatteria slateri Standl.
- Guatteria spectabilis Diels
- Guatteria stenocarpa Lobão, Maas & Mello-Silva
- Guatteria stenopetala R.E.Fr.
- Guatteria stenophylla Maas & Westra
- Guatteria stipitata R.E.Fr.
- Guatteria subsessilis Mart.
- Guatteria synsepala Maas & Westra
- Guatteria tacarcunae Erkens & Maas
- Guatteria talamancana N.Zamora & Maas
- Guatteria tenera R.E.Fr.
- Guatteria terminalis R.E.Fr.
- Guatteria tomentosa Rusby
- Guatteria trichocarpa Erkens & Maas
- Guatteria trichostemon R.E.Fr.
- Guatteria turrialbana N.Zamora & Erkens
- Guatteria ucayalina Huber
- Guatteria vallensis Maas & Westra
- Guatteria venezuelana R.E.Fr.
- Guatteria venosa Erkens & Maas
- Guatteria verrucosa R.E.Fr.
- Guatteria verruculosa R.E.Fr.
- Guatteria villosissima A.St.-Hil.
- Guatteria wachenheimii Benoist
- Guatteria wokomungensis Scharf & Maas
- Guatteria zamorae Erkens & Maas
