= Ischnodemus variegatus =

Scientific classification
- Kingdom: Animalia
- Phylum: Arthropoda
- Class: Insecta
- Order: Hemiptera
- Suborder: Heteroptera
- Family: Blissidae
- Genus: Ischnodemus
- Species: I. variegatus

Binomial name
- Ischnodemus variegatus Signoret

Species of true bug

Ischnodemus variegatus is a species of insect in the order of true bugs known by the common name myakka bug. It is native to Central and South America. It is also known as an introduced species in Florida in the United States.

This bug is elongated in shape with an M-shaped mark at the wing-cover bases. The female is about 7 millimeters long and the male is about 6 millimeters. The adult can fly, but each flight is just a jump of a few meters at most, and the gravid female tends not to fly. The adult and juvenile produce a noxious scent when disturbed. The female lays masses of up to 38 eggs each, with an average of 12. The egg is about 3 millimeters long and white when freshly laid, turning red in time. The egg mass is usually deposited near the attachment of the leaf sheath to the stem of a plant.

The eggs hatch in about 12 days. The newly emerged nymph is about 1.5 millimeters long. There are five instars. The new nymphs remain in a group near their eggs, and later hide under the leaf sheaths. There they suck sap from the plant tissues. By the fifth instar stage, many nymphs have dispersed and become solitary. The fifth-instar nymph is about 5.5 millimeters long. Nymphal development takes about 29 days.

The main host plant for the bug is West Indian marsh grass (Hymenachne amplexicaulis). The bug is occasionally able to complete its life cycle on other plants, including water paspalum (Paspalum repens), beaked panicgrass (Panicum anceps), and fire flag (Thalia geniculata), but this is rare.

West Indian marsh grass is a semiaquatic perennial grass that forms dense stands by spreading via stolons. It is native to tropical Central and South America, where it is utilized for forage on flood-prone land. It has occasionally been introduced to other regions as a pasture grass, such as Queensland. It was noted as an introduced species in Florida by the 1970s and it is still a notorious noxious weed of wetland habitats, where its thick stands displace native flora. In 2000, I. variegatus was discovered feeding voraciously on the weed in Myakka River State Park in Sarasota County, Florida. Damage by the bug causes a red discoloration of the leaves, followed by browning and the death of the plant. The bug reduces photosynthesis, growth, and biomass.

Because it is efficient and host-specific, the bug has been suggested as a potential agent of biological pest control for the weed.

Among the natural enemies of the bug are a scelionid wasp of the genus Eumicrosoma, which is an egg parasitoid, and the entomopathogenic fungus Beauveria bassiana.

This species was formerly treated as synonymous with Ischnodemus oblongus.
