= Cavelerius saccharivorus =

Scientific classification
- Domain: Eukaryota
- Kingdom: Animalia
- Phylum: Arthropoda
- Class: Insecta
- Order: Hemiptera
- Suborder: Heteroptera
- Family: Blissidae
- Genus: Cavelerius
- Species: C. saccharivorus

Binomial name
- Cavelerius saccharivorus (Okajima, 1922)

Synonyms
- Blissus saccharivorus Ischnodemus saccharivorus Macropes excavatus

Species of insect

Cavelerius saccharivorus, also known as the oriental chinch bug, is a small Asian true bug in the order Hemiptera and family Blissidae. It feeds by sucking the sap out of the stems of grasses and grass-like plants, including rice plants and sugarcane. Cavelerius saccharivorus is notorious for the damage it wrought to sugarcane plantations in Japan, China, and Taiwan in the early 20th century, from which it derives its Latin name saccharivorus, meaning "sugar-eater". Even today, the insect is still listed as one of the 100 most economically-devastating invasive species to Japan by the Ecological Society of Japan.

The English name "oriental chinch bug" derives from the insect's visual similarity to the "true chinch bug" (Blissus leucopterus) found in North America, which is likewise a major agricultural pest and also a member of family Blissidae. The name "chinch bug" originally derives from the Spanish chinche, which refers to the bed bug and is in turn derived from the Latin cimex. Chinch bugs are not related to the bed bug, but took this name on account of producing a similar smell to that of bed bugs when crushed.

== Identification ==
Adult examples of C. saccharivorus measure 7-8 millimeters long. The body color is glossy black, and the legs and the first antenna segments are yellowish brown. There is a black spot in the center of each wing.

== Origin and spread ==
C. saccharivorus is believed to have originated in Taiwan. The insect suddenly appeared simultaneously in several parts of Japan, including Okinawa, Kagoshima prefecture, Miyazaki prefecture, and Tanegashima in the 1910s, likely due to the rapid growth of the sugar industry and the circulation of different cultivars of sugarcane. The species proved impossible to eradicate, despite mass burnings of infested sugarcane plantations at the behest of the Japanese government. In recent decades, C. saccharivorus has been found on sugarcane plants in Jiangxi province in China, about 300 miles inland from the Taiwan Strait.

== Control ==
An important biological agent for controlling populations of the C. saccharivorus is the parasitic wasp Eumicrosoma blissae, which lays a single egg inside an egg laid by C. saccharivorus. Field studies where the wasp is present have found an over 50% parasitism rate. Other means of control include organic and inorganic pesticides, with mixed results.
