= Blissus canadensis =

Scientific classification
- Domain: Eukaryota
- Kingdom: Animalia
- Phylum: Arthropoda
- Class: Insecta
- Order: Hemiptera
- Suborder: Heteroptera
- Family: Blissidae
- Genus: Blissus
- Species: B. canadensis

Binomial name
- Blissus canadensis Leonard, 1970

Species of true bug

Blissus canadensis is a species of true bug in the family Blissidae. It is found in North America.
