= Blissus arenarius =

Scientific classification
- Domain: Eukaryota
- Kingdom: Animalia
- Phylum: Arthropoda
- Class: Insecta
- Order: Hemiptera
- Suborder: Heteroptera
- Family: Blissidae
- Genus: Blissus
- Species: B. arenarius

Binomial name
- Blissus arenarius Barber, 1918

Species of true bug

Blissus arenarius is a species of true bug in the family Blissidae. It is found in North America.

== Subspecies ==
These two subspecies belong to the species Blissus arenarius:

- Blissus arenarius arenarius Barber, 1918
- Blissus arenarius maritimus Leonard, 1966
