= Ischnodemus badius =

Scientific classification
- Kingdom: Animalia
- Phylum: Arthropoda
- Class: Insecta
- Order: Hemiptera
- Suborder: Heteroptera
- Family: Blissidae
- Genus: Ischnodemus
- Species: I. badius

Binomial name
- Ischnodemus badius Van Duzee, 1909

Species of true bug

Ischnodemus badius is a species in the suborder Heteroptera ("true bugs"), in the order Hemiptera ("true bugs, cicadas, hoppers, aphids and allies"). Ischnodemus badius is found in North America. It feeds on Spartina patens.
