= Ischnodemus sallei =

Scientific classification
- Domain: Eukaryota
- Kingdom: Animalia
- Phylum: Arthropoda
- Class: Insecta
- Order: Hemiptera
- Suborder: Heteroptera
- Family: Blissidae
- Genus: Ischnodemus
- Species: I. sallei

Binomial name
- Ischnodemus sallei (De Geer, 1773)

Synonyms
- Ischnodemus fulvipes (De Geer, 1773)

Species of true bug

Ischnodemus sallei is a species of true bug in the family Blissidae. It is found in the Caribbean Sea, Central America, North America, and South America. Ischnodemus fulvipes has been determined to be a taxonomic synonym of Ischnodemus sallei.
