= Blissus sweeti =

Scientific classification
- Domain: Eukaryota
- Kingdom: Animalia
- Phylum: Arthropoda
- Class: Insecta
- Order: Hemiptera
- Suborder: Heteroptera
- Family: Blissidae
- Genus: Blissus
- Species: B. sweeti

Binomial name
- Blissus sweeti Leonard, 1968

Species of true bug

Blissus sweeti is a species of true bug in the family Blissidae. It is found in Central America and North America.
