= Extarademus umbratus =

Scientific classification
- Domain: Eukaryota
- Kingdom: Animalia
- Phylum: Arthropoda
- Class: Insecta
- Order: Hemiptera
- Suborder: Heteroptera
- Family: Blissidae
- Genus: Extarademus
- Species: E. umbratus

Binomial name
- Extarademus umbratus (Distant, 1893)

Synonyms
- Toonglasa umbrata (Distant, 1893)

Species of true bug

Extarademus umbratus is a species of true bug in the family Blissidae. It is found in Central, North and South America.
