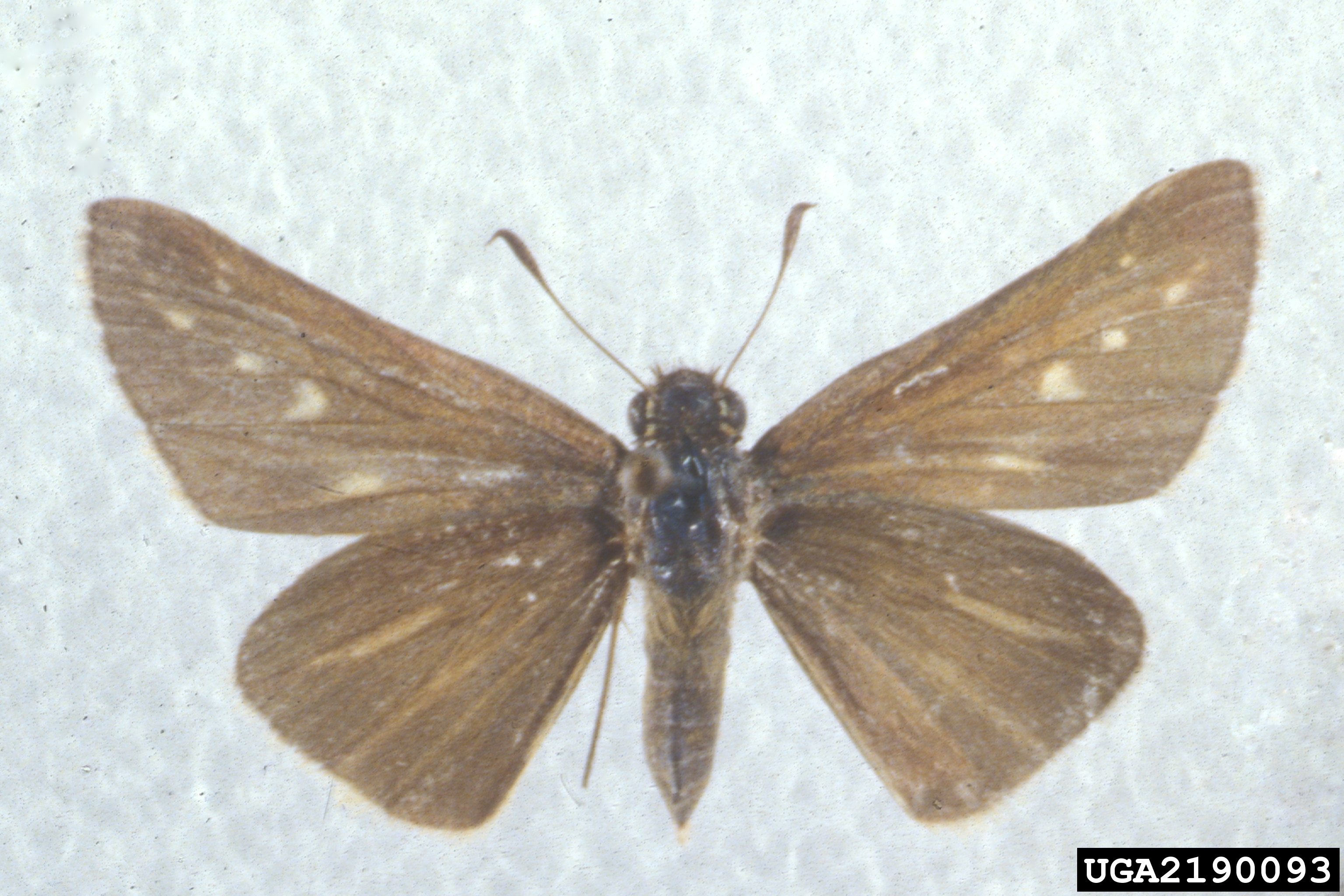

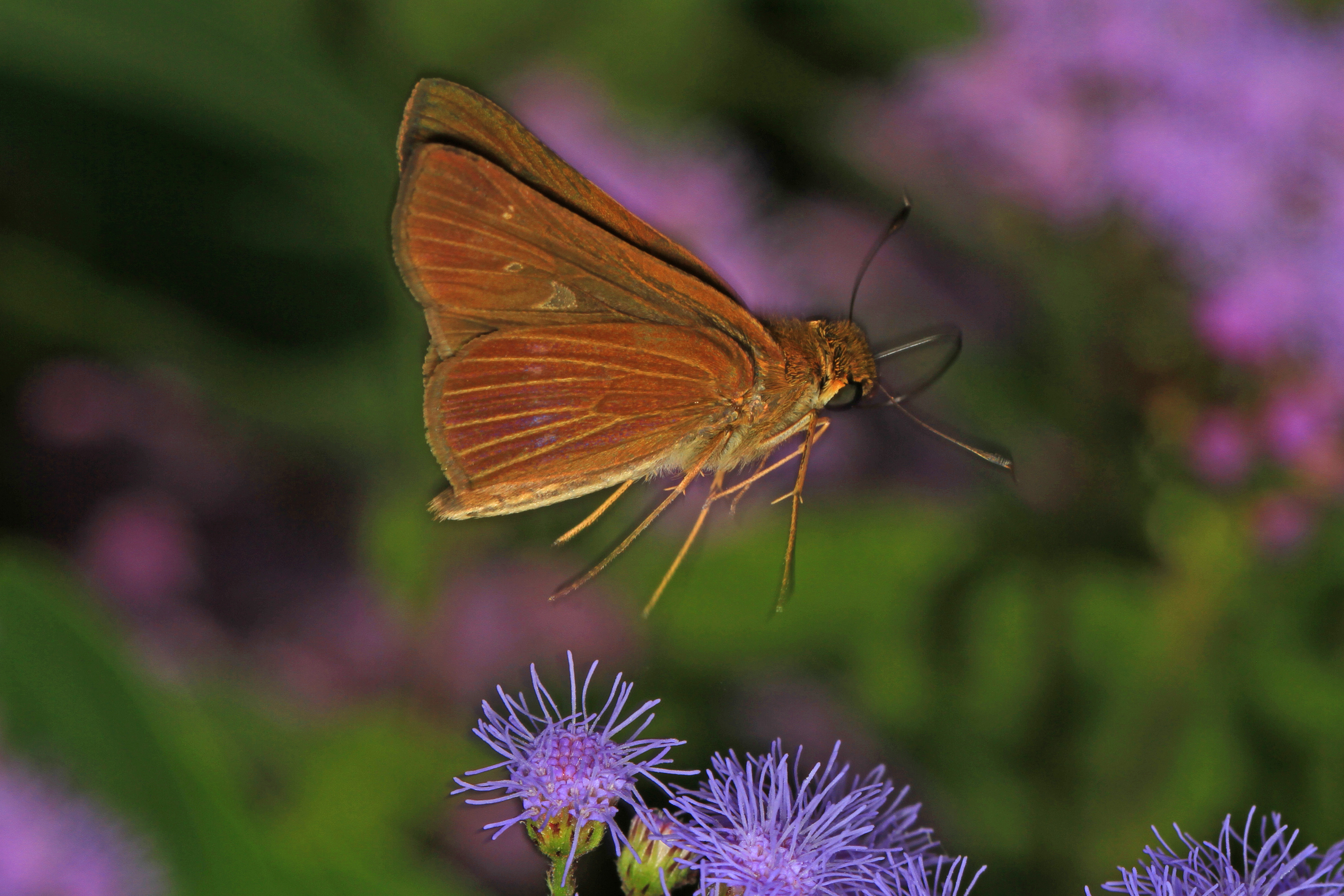
- A mounted specimen, and the imago in flight, Virginia

Conservation status
- Secure (NatureServe)

Scientific classification
- Kingdom: Animalia
- Phylum: Arthropoda
- Class: Insecta
- Order: Lepidoptera
- Family: Hesperiidae
- Genus: Panoquina
- Species: P. ocola

Binomial name
- Panoquina ocola (W.H. Edwards, 1863)

Synonyms
- Hesperia ocola Edwards, 1863; Calpodes ocola; Prenes ocola; Pamphila stratyllis Burmeister, 1878; Pamphila heterospila Mabille, 1878; Pamphila ortygia Möschler, 1883

= Panoquina ocola =

Ocola skipper

Species of butterfly

Panoquina ocola, the ocola skipper or long-winged skipper, is a species of butterfly of the family Hesperiidae. It is found in Paraguay north through tropical America and the West Indies to south Texas, and strays occur north to southeast Arizona, Kansas, Illinois, Michigan, southern Ontario, and New York.

The wingspan is 35–43 mm.

The larvae feed on Oryza sativa, Saccharum officinarum and Hymenachne amplexicaulis.

== Subspecies ==
- Panoquina ocola ocola — Florida to Ohio, Mexico to Brazil, Argentina, Venezuela to Peru, Suriname
- Panoquina ocola distipuncta Johnson & Matusik, 1988 — Dominican Republic

== Gallery ==
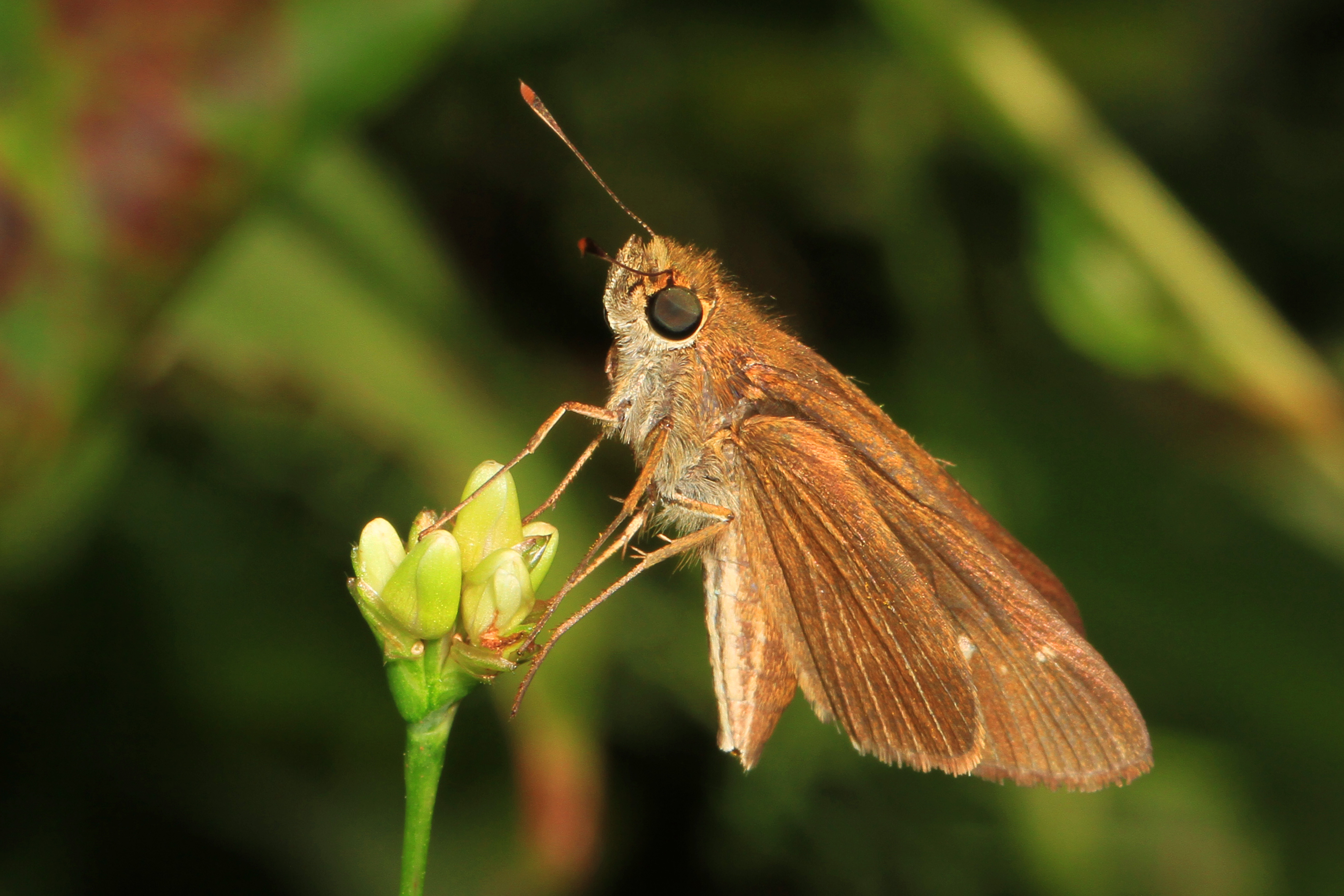
Feeding imago

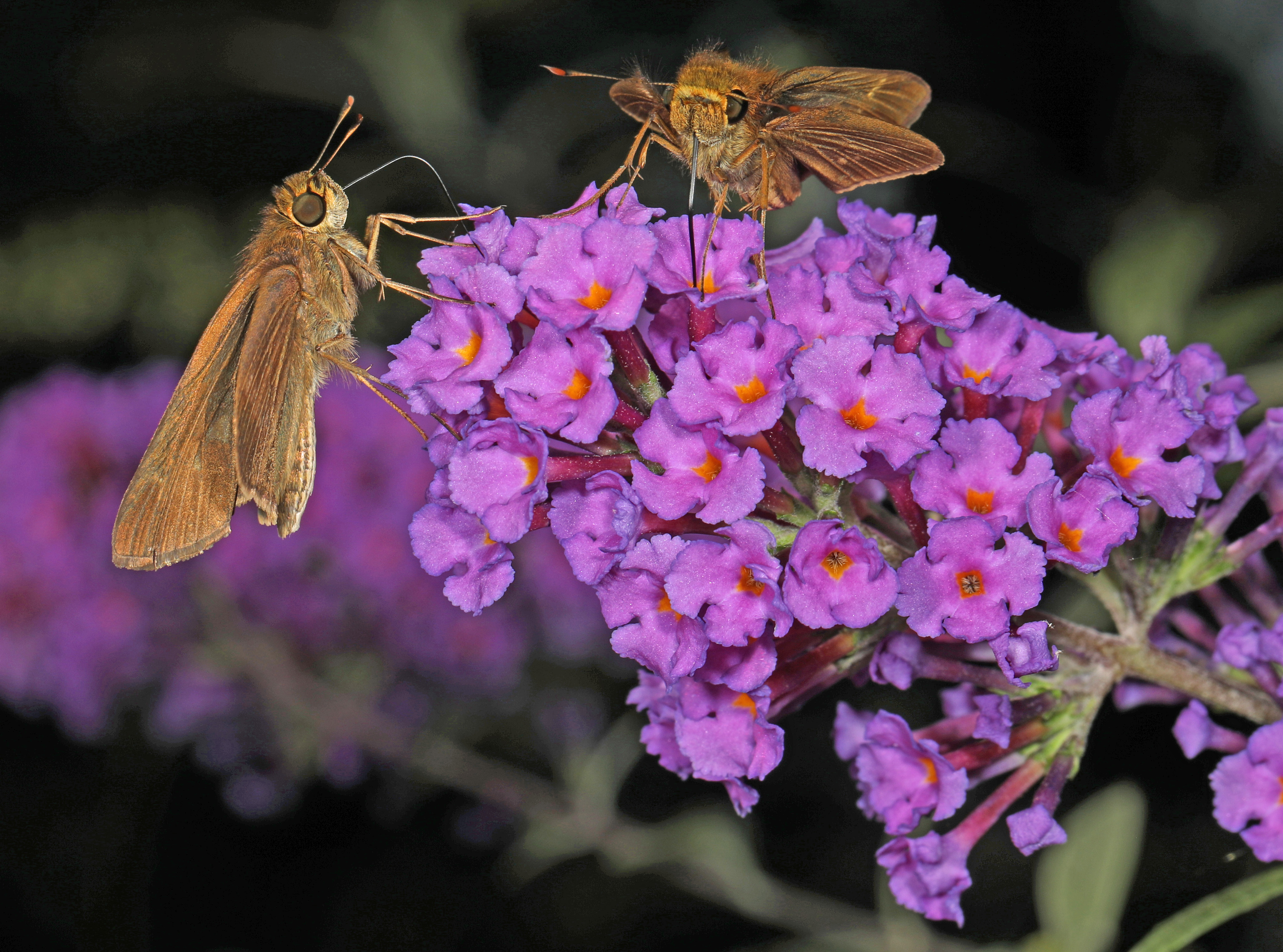
A pair feeding at Buddleja inflorescence
