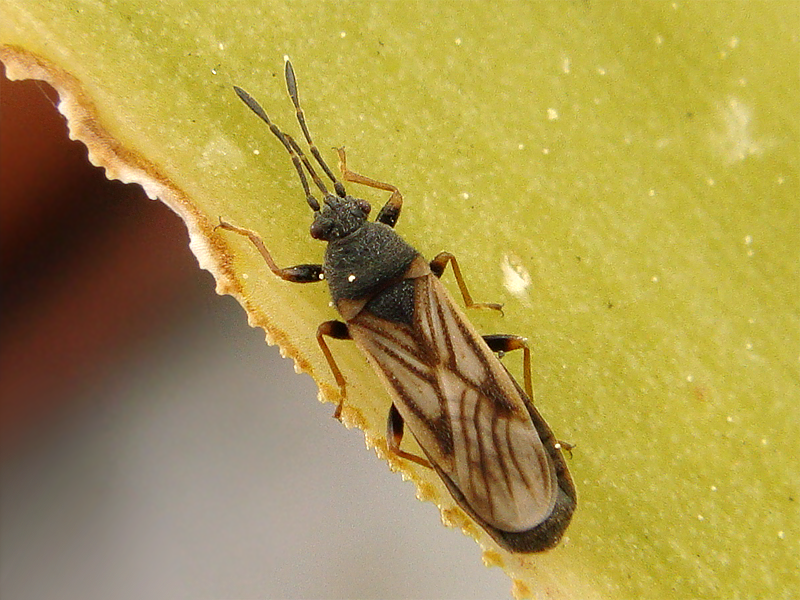
- Macropterous adult

Scientific classification
- Domain: Eukaryota
- Kingdom: Animalia
- Phylum: Arthropoda
- Class: Insecta
- Order: Hemiptera
- Suborder: Heteroptera
- Family: Blissidae
- Genus: Ischnodemus
- Species: I. sabuleti

Binomial name
- Ischnodemus sabuleti (Fallén, 1826)

Synonyms
- Lygaeus sabuleti Fallén, 1826; Pachymerus decurtatus Herrich-Schaeffer, 1837

= Ischnodemus sabuleti =

Species of true bug

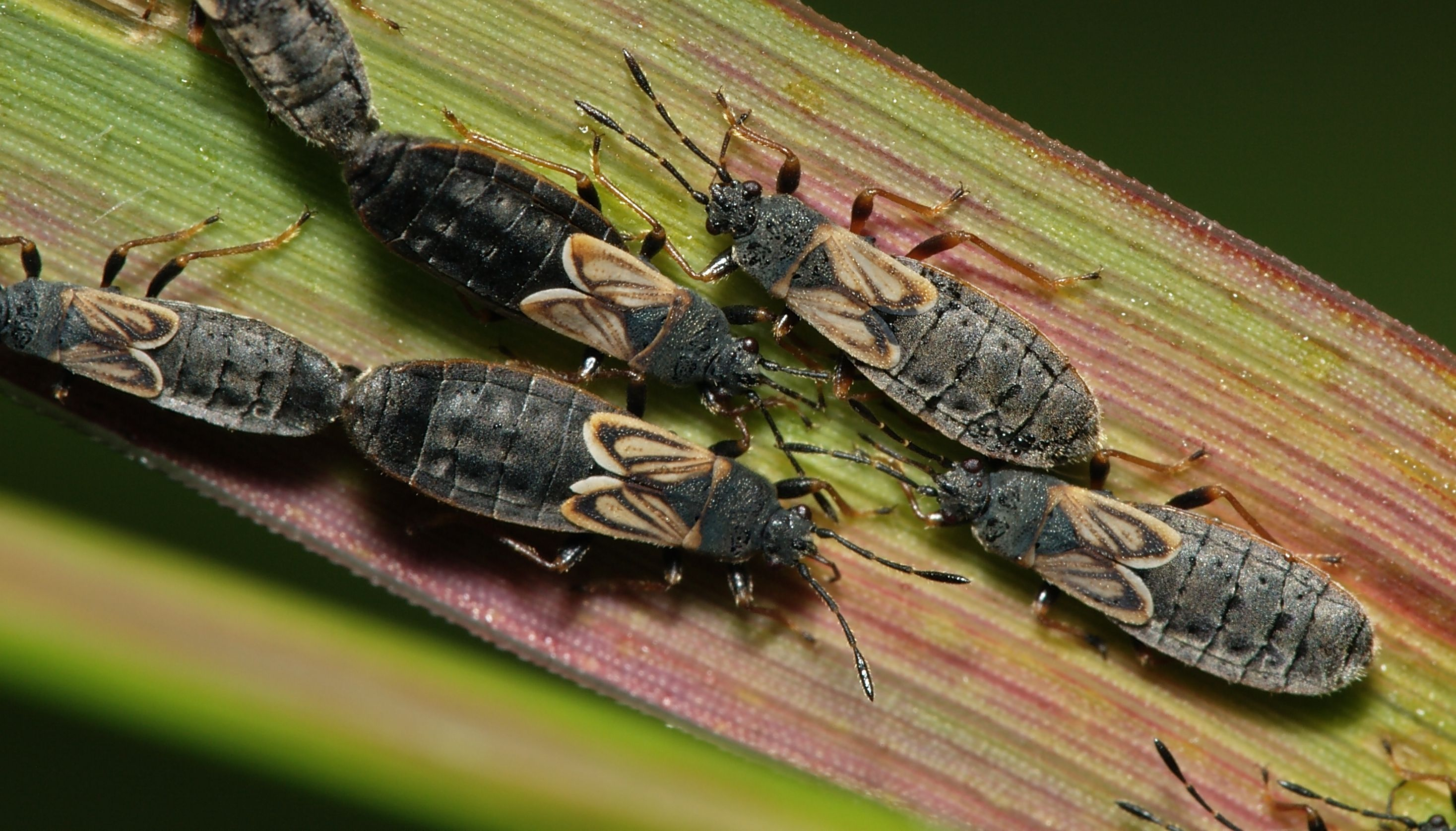
Micropterous adults mating

Ischnodemus sabuleti, also known as the European chinch bug, is a species of swarming true bug from the family Blissidae, which family also includes the American Chinch Bug Blissus leucopterus. It was first described by Carl Fredrik Fallén in 1826.

== Description ==
Adult bugs are 4-6mm long, very slender elliptical overall and have a black base color. The rear edge of the pronotum, parts of the hemelytra, the tibiae and tarsi, and the tips of the femora, are yellow-brown in colour. The species is dimorphic: some individuals are macropterous (fully winged) and others micropterous (very short winged). The two types are estimated to be roughly equally numerous. A form with wings of intermediate length is occasionally found. Nymphs are of a similar shape with the hind part of the abdomen scarlet.

== Distribution and habitat ==
The species is common in most of mainland Europe and absent only from the far North. It occurs also in the Western North Africa and further East through Eastern Europe to Siberia and the Caucasus. It is widely found in Germany and in places is very numerous. In the South, it is less common than in the North. In Austria, it occurs only in the East.

In the British Isles its history has been one of gradual expansion over many decades. Prior to 1893 it was known only from one site in Surrey; by 1959 it had reached Hampshire, Oxfordshire and Essex; the spread has continued since then and by 2014 it was being reported as far north as Yorkshire and west to parts of Somerset.

Ischnodemus sabuleti is often found in coastal areas on beachgrass (Ammophila), couch grass (Elymus) and other dune grasses; also in inland wetlands where swarms of thousands are often found, particularly on sweet-grass (Glyceria), less commonly on canarygrass (Phalaris), common reed (Phragmites) or cattails (Typha). Occasionally, they are found in summer in dry locations, where they live for example in small-reed (Calamagrostis). In times of rain the nymphs and adults shelter on the underside of the leaf sheaths, from where the adults climb higher on the stalks in fine weather.

== Development ==
The insects require two years for their development. Overwintering adults mate from the end of May until the beginning of July. By late autumn the nymphs reach the third to fifth stage, and then hibernate. From about July of next year, the nymphs complete their development to adults. The adults are active even at quite low temperatures in the winter.
