= Dactylispa cladophora =

Scientific classification
- Kingdom: Animalia
- Phylum: Arthropoda
- Clade: Pancrustacea
- Class: Insecta
- Order: Coleoptera
- Suborder: Polyphaga
- Infraorder: Cucujiformia
- Family: Chrysomelidae
- Genus: Dactylispa
- Species: D. cladophora

Binomial name
- Dactylispa cladophora (Guérin-Méneville, 1841)

Synonyms
- Hispa cladophora Guérin-Méneville, 1841

Species of beetle

Dactylispa cladophora is a species of beetle of the family Chrysomelidae. It is found on the Bismarck Islands and in Indonesia (Java), Malaysia and the Philippines (Leyte, Luzon).

== Life history ==
The recorded host plants for this species are Bambusa blumeana and Hymenachne species.
