= Ischnodemus brunnipennis =

Scientific classification
- Kingdom: Animalia
- Phylum: Arthropoda
- Class: Insecta
- Order: Hemiptera
- Suborder: Heteroptera
- Family: Blissidae
- Genus: Ischnodemus
- Species: I. brunnipennis

Binomial name
- Ischnodemus brunnipennis (Germar, 1837)

Species of true bug

Ischnodemus brunnipennis is a species of true bug in the family Blissidae. It is found in North America.
