= Ischnodemus hesperius =

Scientific classification
- Domain: Eukaryota
- Kingdom: Animalia
- Phylum: Arthropoda
- Class: Insecta
- Order: Hemiptera
- Suborder: Heteroptera
- Family: Blissidae
- Genus: Ischnodemus
- Species: I. hesperius

Binomial name
- Ischnodemus hesperius Parshley, 1922

Species of true bug

Ischnodemus hesperius is a species of true bug in the family Blissidae. It is found in North America.
