= Blissus insularis =

Scientific classification
- Domain: Eukaryota
- Kingdom: Animalia
- Phylum: Arthropoda
- Class: Insecta
- Order: Hemiptera
- Suborder: Heteroptera
- Family: Blissidae
- Genus: Blissus
- Species: B. insularis

Binomial name
- Blissus insularis Barber, 1918

Species of true bug

Blissus insularis, the southern chinch bug, is a species of true bug in the family Blissidae. It is found in North America and Oceania. The southern chinch bug is known to be a pest due to its feeding on St. Augustine grass.
