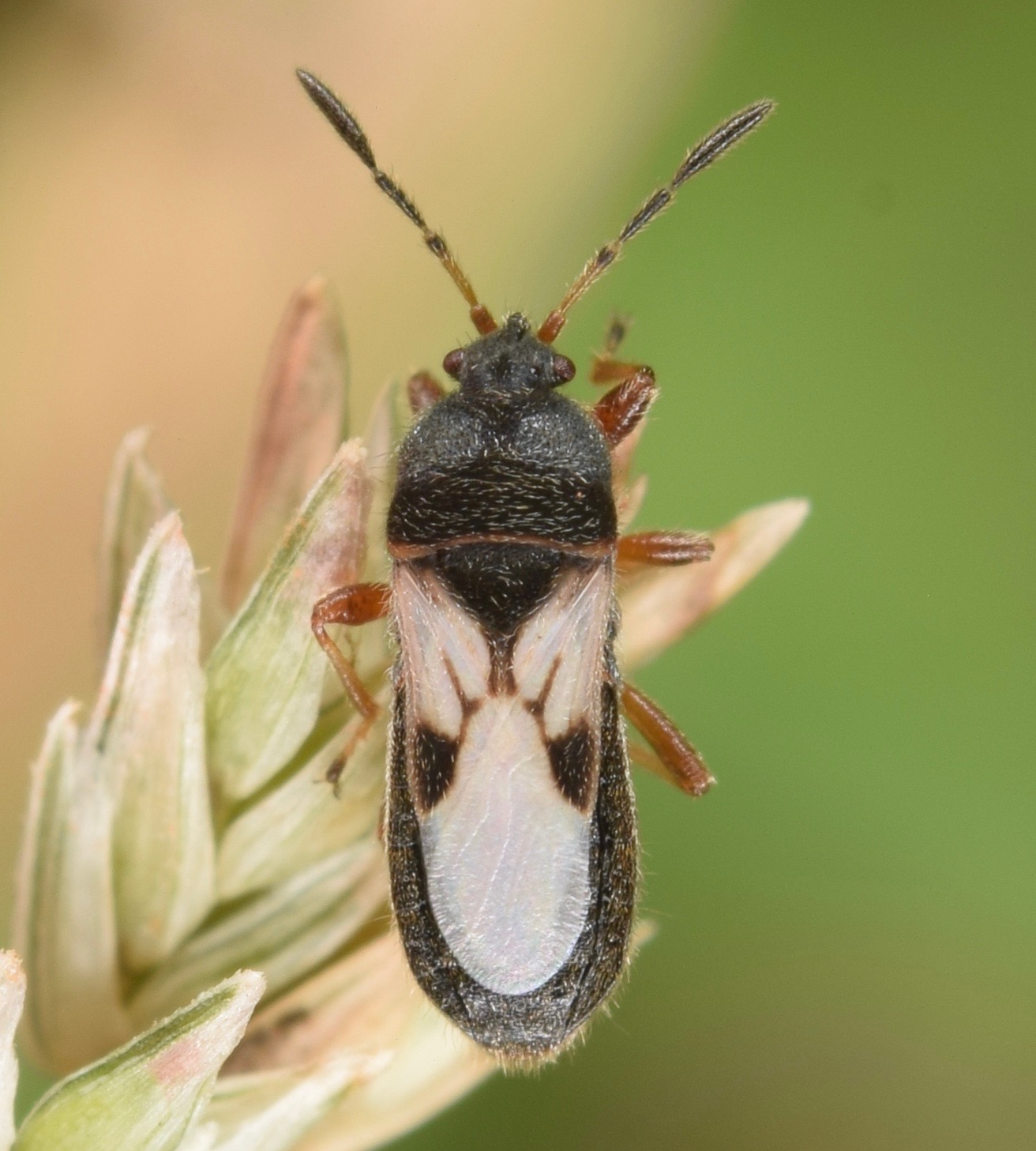

Scientific classification
- Kingdom: Animalia
- Phylum: Arthropoda
- Class: Insecta
- Order: Hemiptera
- Suborder: Heteroptera
- Family: Blissidae
- Genus: Blissus; Burmeister, 1835

= Blissus =

Genus of true bugs

Blissus is a genus in the true bug family Blissidae, commonly called chinch bugs in North America. The review by Slater (1979) listed 27 species. The species B. leucopterus, B. occiduus and B. insularis are important pests of cereal crops and turf grasses in their different ranges in the United States.

== List of species ==
- Blissus antillus Leonard, 1968
- Blissus arenarius Barber, 1918
  - Blissus arenarius maritimus Leonard, 1966
- Blissus barberi Leonard, 1968
- Blissus bosqi Drake, 1940
- Blissus brasiliensis Drake, 1951
- Blissus breviusculus Barber, 1937
- Blissus canadensis Leonard, 1970
- Blissus hygrobius (Jensen-Haarup, 1920)
- Blissus insularis Barber, 1918 - southern chinch bug
- Blissus iowensis Andre, 1937
- Blissus leucopterus (Say, 1831) - true chinch bug
  - Blissus leucopterus hirtus Montandon, 1893 - hairy chinch bug
- Blissus minutus (Blatchley, 1925)
- Blissus mixtus Barber, 1937
- Blissus nanus Barber, 1937
- Blissus occiduus Barber, 1918 - western chinch bug
- Blissus omani Barber, 1937
- Blissus parasitaster (Bergroth, 1903)
- Blissus penningtoni Drake, 1941
- Blissus planarius Barber, 1937
- Blissus planus Leonard, 1968
- Blissus pulchellus Montandon, 1893
- Blissus richardsoni Drake, 1940
- Blissus slateri Leonard, 1968
- Blissus sweeti Leonard, 1968
- Blissus villosus Barber, 1937
- Blissus weiseri (Drake, 1951)
- Blissus yumana Drake, 1951
