= Macropes =

Scientific classification
- Kingdom: Animalia
- Phylum: Arthropoda
- Class: Insecta
- Order: Hemiptera
- Suborder: Heteroptera
- Superfamily: Lygaeoidea
- Family: Blissidae
- Genus: Macropes; Motschulsky, 1859

Synonyms
- Rhabdomorphus Bergroth, 1918

Genus of true bugs

External image
- Images at iNaturalist

Macropes is a genus of Asian and African seed bugs in the family Blissidae, erected by Victor Motschulsky in 1859. There are (probably incomplete) records for species distribution from: Africa, India, Indochina (Vietnam) and Australia.

== Species ==
The Lygaeoidea Species File includes:

1. Macropes africanus Slater & Wilcox, 1973
2. Macropes albosignatus Distant, 1918
3. Macropes alternatus Slater & Wilcox, 1973
4. Macropes australis (Distant, 1901)
5. Macropes bacillus (Gerstaecker, 1873)
6. Macropes brunneus Slater & Wilcox, 1973
7. Macropes burmanus Slater & Wilcox, 1973
8. Macropes comosus Slater, Ashlock & Wilcox, 1969
9. Macropes complanus Gao & Bu, 2010
10. Macropes consimilis Distant, 1918
11. Macropes consobrinus Distant, 1918
12. Macropes crassifemur Slater & Wilcox, 1973
13. Macropes dentipes Motschulsky, 1859
14. Macropes dilutus Distant, 1901
15. Macropes exilis Slater & Wilcox, 1973
16. Macropes femoralis Distant, 1918
17. Macropes harringtonae Slater, Ashlock & Wilcox, 1969
18. Macropes hoberlandti Slater & Ahmad, 1967
19. Macropes lacertosus Bergroth, 1918
20. Macropes lobatus Slater, Ashlock & Wilcox, 1969
21. Macropes longurio (Bergroth, 1918)
22. Macropes maai Slater & Wilcox, 1973
23. Macropes maculosus Slater & Wilcox, 1973
24. Macropes major Matsumura, 1913
25. Macropes minor Slater, Ashlock & Wilcox, 1969
26. Macropes monticolus Zheng, 1981
27. Macropes nigrolineatus Distant, 1918
28. Macropes obnubilus (Distant, 1883)
29. Macropes peculiaris Gao & Bu, 2010
30. Macropes philippinensis Distant, 1909
31. Macropes pilosus Slater, Ashlock & Wilcox, 1969
32. Macropes praecerptus Distant, 1904
33. Macropes pronotalis Distant, 1918
34. Macropes pseudofemoralis Slater, Ashlock & Wilcox, 1969
35. Macropes punctatus (Walker, 1872)
36. Macropes raja Distant, 1909
37. Macropes robustus Zheng & Zou, 1982
38. Macropes rufipes Distant, 1911
39. Macropes simoni Distant, 1918
40. Macropes sinicus Zheng & Zou, 1982
41. Macropes spinimanus Motschulsky, 1859 - type species (by subsequent designation)
42. Macropes subauratus Distant, 1904
43. Macropes sultanus Distant, 1901
44. Macropes testaceus Gao & Bu, 2010
45. Macropes umbrosus Slater & Wilcox, 1973
46. Macropes uniformis Distant, 1909
47. Macropes varipennis (Walker, 1872)
48. Macropes yoshimotoi Slater, Ashlock & Wilcox, 1969
