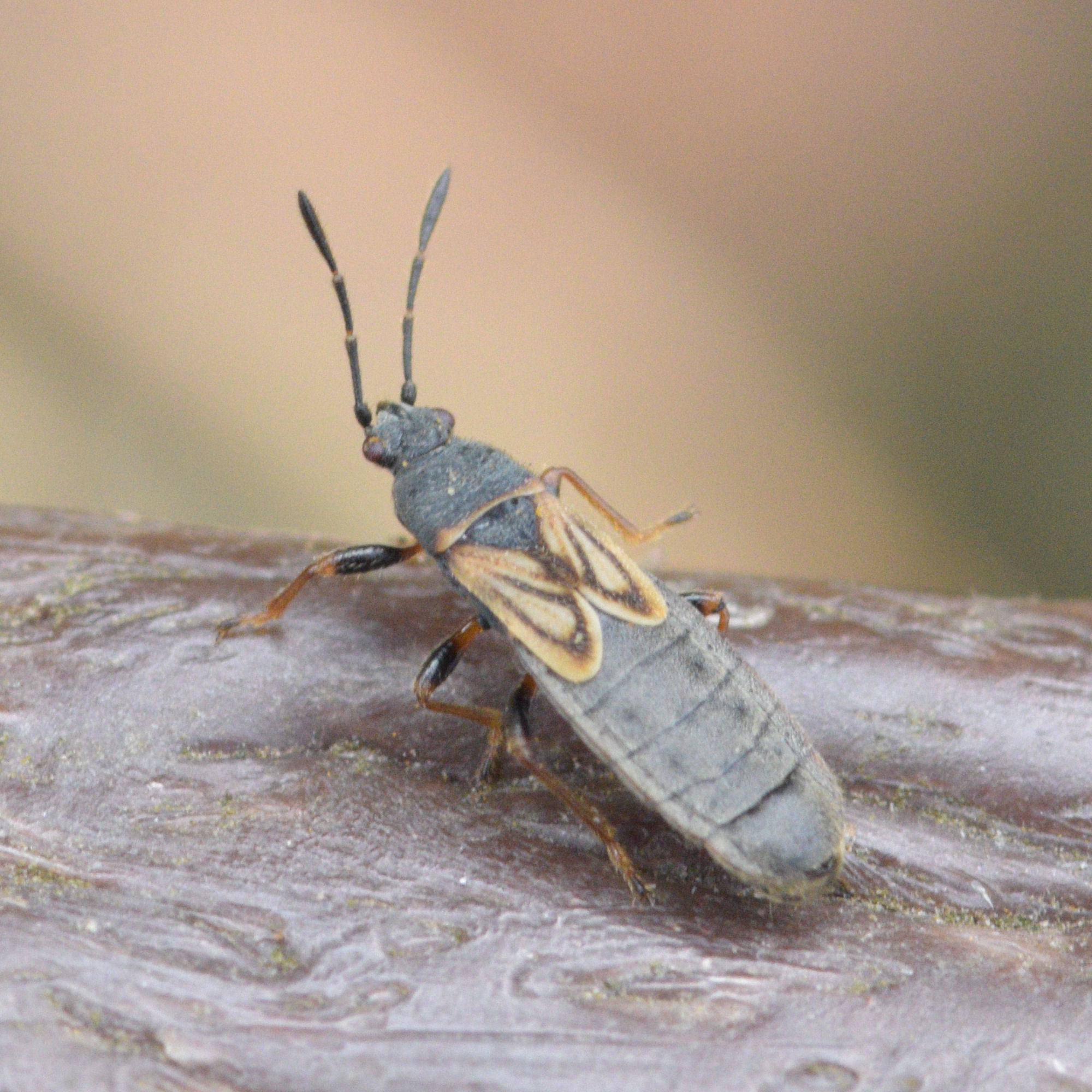
- Ischnodemus sabuleti

Scientific classification
- Kingdom: Animalia
- Phylum: Arthropoda
- Class: Insecta
- Order: Hemiptera
- Suborder: Heteroptera
- Family: Blissidae
- Genus: Ischnodemus; Fieber, 1837

= Ischnodemus =

Genus of true bugs

Ischnodemus is a genus in the true bug family Blissidae. The review by Slater (1979) listed 95 species. The genus is found in all major zoogeographic regions, being most abundant on various species of Gramineae. The bodies of the adults are moderately to very elongated. The genus name was coined to refer to this slenderness, from the Greek ἰσχνόσ (ischnos) "feeble" and δέμασ (demas) "body".

== List of species ==
- Ischnodemus agilis (Spinola, 1852)
- Ischnodemus aleocharoides (Jakovlev, 1905) (doubtful assignment)
- Ischnodemus ambiguus Slater, Ashlock, and Wilcox, 1969
- Ischnodemus antennatus Slater and Wilcox, 1969
- Ischnodemus asciaformis Slater & Harrington, 1970
- Ischnodemus atricolor Berg, 1892
- Ischnodemus badius Van Duzee, 1909
- Ischnodemus basalis Walker, 1872
- Ischnodemus basilewskyi Slater, 1964
- Ischnodemus bequaerti Slater, 1964
- Ischnodemus bosqi S. & W., 1969
- Ischnodemus brevicornis (Stål, 1855)
- Ischnodemus brevirostris Bergroth, 1916
- Ischnodemus brincki Slater, 1964
- Ischnodemus brunnipennis (Germar, 1837)
- Ischnodemus canaliculus Slater, 1964
- Ischnodemus canus Slater, 1967
- Ischnodemus caspius Jakovlev, 1871
- Ischnodemus congoensis Slater, 1964
- Ischnodemus conicus Van Duzee, 1909
- Ischnodemus consobrinus (Distant, 1918)
- Ischnodemus crassipes Slater, 1964
- Ischnodemus dentatus Wagner, 1963
- Ischnodemus diplachne S. & H., 1970
- Ischnodemus discolor (Walker, 1870)
- Ischnodemus falicus Say, 1831
- Ischnodemus fallax S. & H., 1970
- Ischnodemus formosensis S. & W., 1969
- Ischnodemus fulvipes (DeGeer, 1773)
- Ischnodemus fumidus S. A. & W., 1969
- Ischnodemus gayi (Spinola, 1852)
- Ischnodemus genei (Spinola, 1837)
- Ischnodemus grossinigrus S. & W., 1969
- Ischnodemus grossus Slater, 1964
- Ischnodemus hesperius Parshley, 1922
- Ischnodemus inambitiosus B. White, 1879
- Ischnodemus inornatus S. & H., 1970
- Ischnodemus jaxartensis Reuter, 1885
- Ischnodemus lactipennis S. & W., 1969
- Ischnodemus linearis (Stål, 1855)
- Ischnodemus lobatus Van Duzee, 1919
- Ischnodemus madagascariensis S. & H., 1970
- Ischnodemus mendax S. & H., 1970
- Ischnodemus missouriensis Froeschner, 1944
- Ischnodemus montanus S. & H., 1970
- Ischnodemus neotropicalis S. & W., 1969
- Ischnodemus nigripes Stål, 1874
- Ischnodemus nigrocephalus S. A. & W., 1969
- Ischnodemus nigromaculatus S. & W., 1969
- Ischnodemus nigrostillatus Stål, 1858
- Ischnodemus nigrovenosus S. & W., 1969
- Ischnodemus noctulus Distant, 1901
- Ischnodemus notandus S. & W., 1969
- Ischnodemus oblongus (Fabricius, 1803)
- Ischnodemus obversus S. & H., 1970
- Ischnodemus ocellaris S. & H., 1970
- Ischnodemus ochripes (Stål, 1855)
- Ischnodemus oculatus Slater, 1967
- Ischnodemus parabasalis Slater, 1964
- Ischnodemus paramoides S. & W., 1969
- Ischnodemus parathoracicus S. & H., 1970
- Ischnodemus perplexus S. & H., 1970
- Ischnodemus praecultus Distant, 1883
- Ischnodemus proprius Slater, 1966
- Ischnodemus pseudotibialis S. & W., 1969
- Ischnodemus pulchellus S. & W., 1969
- Ischnodemus pullus S. & W., 1969
- Ischnodemus quadratus Fieber, 1837
- Ischnodemus ranavalonus S. & H., 1970
- Ischnodemus robustus Blatchley, 1926
- Ischnodemus rottensis Statz and Wagner, 1950
- Ischnodemus rufipes Van Duzee, 1909
- Ischnodemus sabuleti Fallen, 1826
- Ischnodemus schoutedeni Slater, 1964
- Ischnodemus severus S. & W., 1969
- Ischnodemus signoreti Berg, 1883
- Ischnodemus sinuatus S. A. & W., 1969
- Ischnodemus slossoni Van Duzee, 1909
- Ischnodemus sordidus Slater, 1968
- Ischnodemus spatulatus S. & W., 1969
- Ischnodemus stali (Signoret, 1858)
- Ischnodemus staliellus S. & W., 1969
- Ischnodemus subflavus S. & W., 1969
- Ischnodemus suturalis Horvath, 1883
- Ischnodemus tenebrosus S. & H., 1970
- Ischnodemus thoracicus (Distant, 1909)
- Ischnodemus tibialis Stål, 1858
- Ischnodemus tibialoides S. & W., 1969
- Ischnodemus torquatus S. & H., 1970
- Ischnodemus transitius S. & W., 1969
- Ischnodemus ulugurus Scudder, 1962
- Ischnodemus umbrosus S. & H., 1970
- Ischnodemus variegatus
- Ischnodemus venustus Slater, 1964
- Ischnodemus wittei Slater, 1964
- Ischnodemus zavattarii Mancini, 1953
