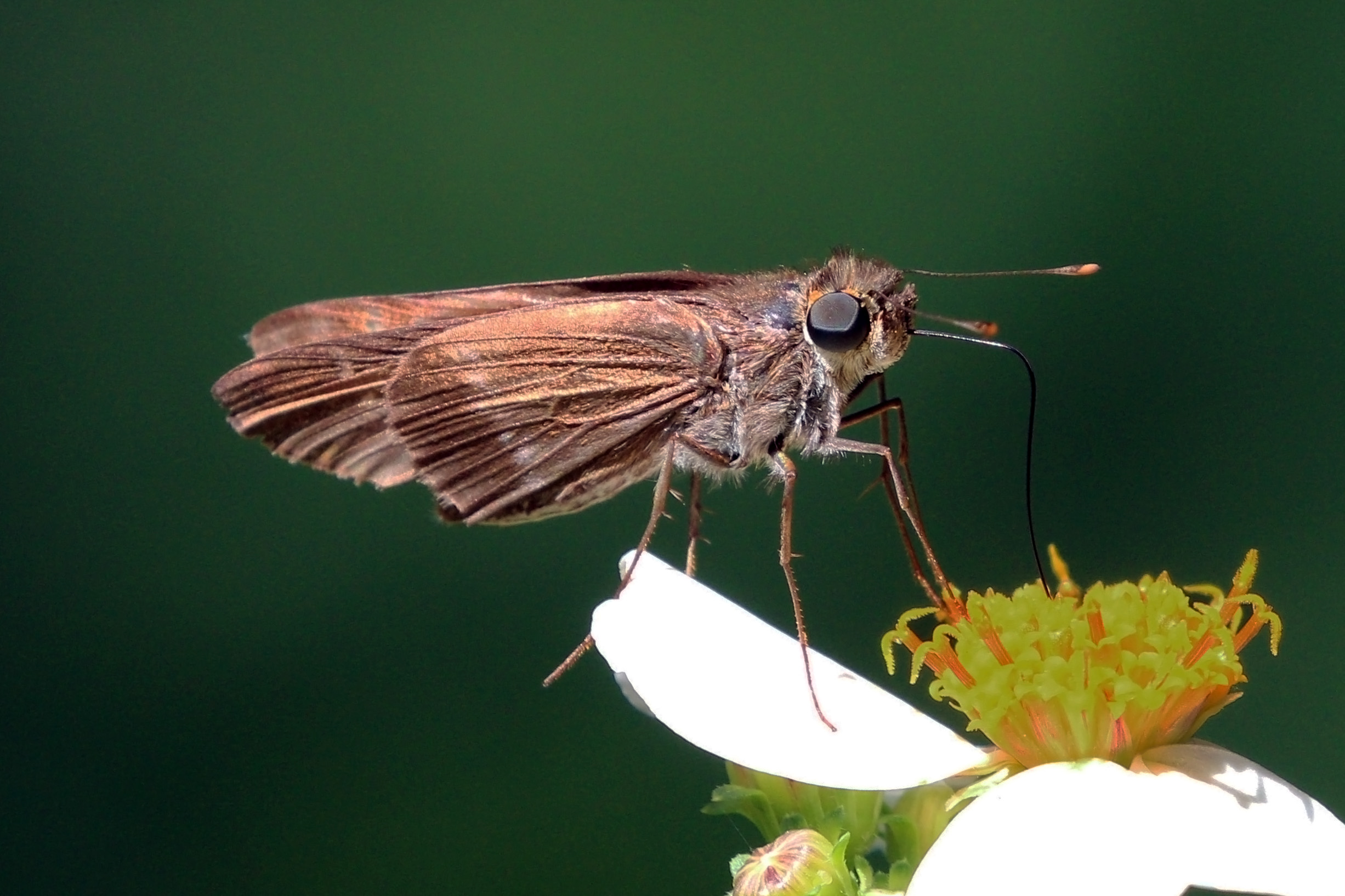
- Purple-washed skipper (P. lucas lucas) in Cuba

Scientific classification
- Kingdom: Animalia
- Phylum: Arthropoda
- Class: Insecta
- Order: Lepidoptera
- Family: Hesperiidae
- Subtribe: Calpodina
- Genus: Panoquina; Hemming, 1934

Synonyms
- Prenes Scudder, 1872

= Panoquina =

Genus of butterflies

Panoquina is a genus of skippers in the family Hesperiidae.

== Species ==
- Panoquina bola Bell, 1942
- Panoquina chapada Evans, 1955
- Panoquina corrupta (Herrich-Schäffer, 1865)
- Panoquina errans (Skinner, 1892)
- Panoquina evadnes (Stoll, [1781])
- Panoquina evansi (Freeman, 1946)
- Panoquina fusina (Hewitson, 1868)
- Panoquina hecebola (Scudder, 1872)
- Panoquina lucas (Fabricius, 1793) – purple-washed skipper
- Panoquina luctuosa (Herrich-Schäffer, 1869)
- Panoquina nero (Fabricius, 1798)
- Panoquina ocola (Edwards, 1863)
- Panoquina panoquin (Scudder, 1863)
- Panoquina panoquinoides (Skinner, 1891)
- Panoquina pauper (Mabille, 1878)
- Panoquina peraea (Hewitson, 1866)
- Panoquina trix Evans, 1955
