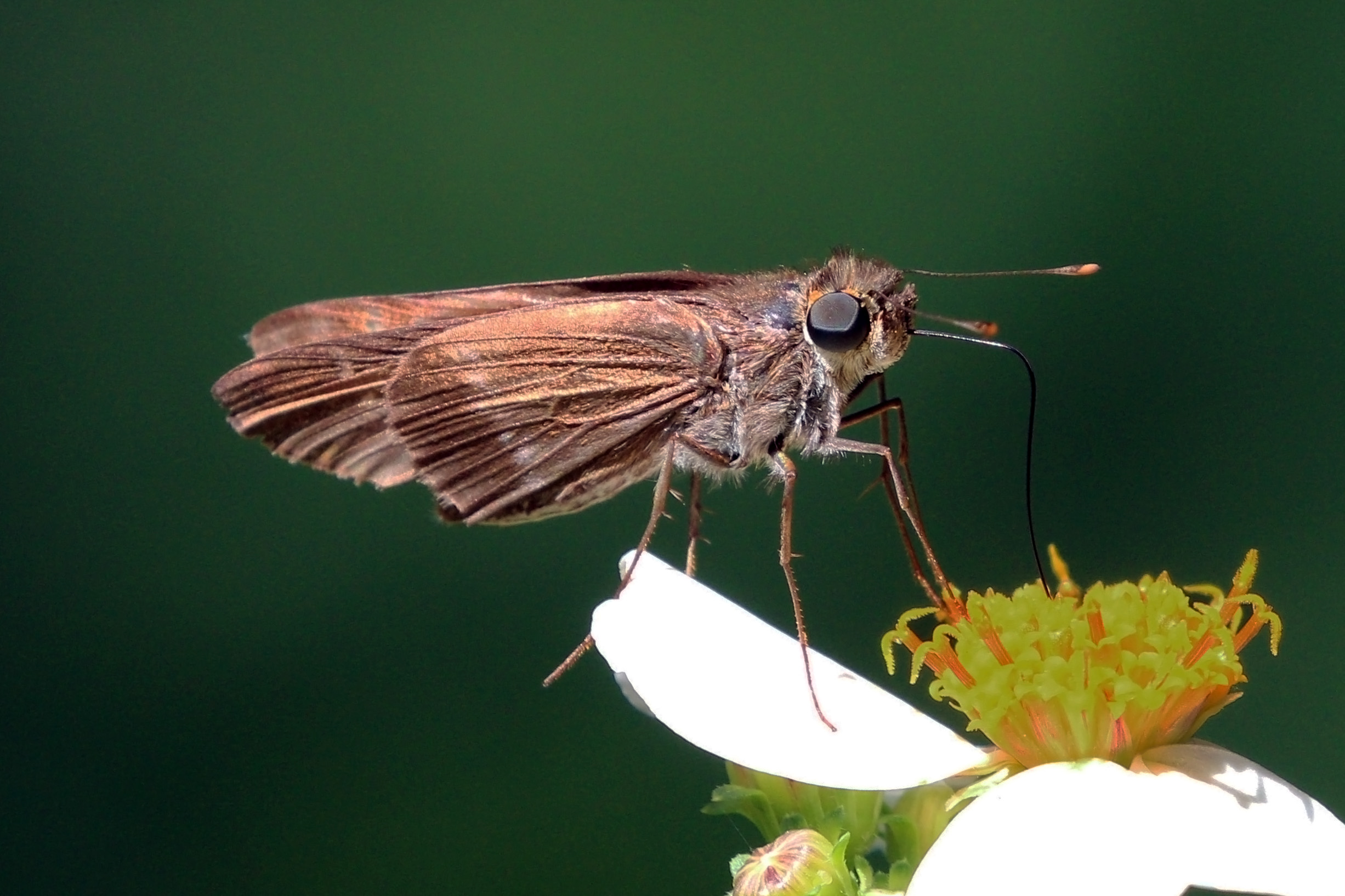

Scientific classification
- Kingdom: Animalia
- Phylum: Arthropoda
- Class: Insecta
- Order: Lepidoptera
- Family: Hesperiidae
- Genus: Panoquina
- Species: P. lucas

Binomial name
- Panoquina lucas (Fabricius, 1793)

Synonyms
- Goniloba sylvicola Herrich-Schäffer, 1865; Panoquina sylvicola (Herrich-Schäffer, 1865)

= Panoquina lucas =

Species of butterfly

Panoquina lucas, the purple-washed skipper, is a species of grass skipper in the butterfly family Hesperiidae. It is found in the Caribbean Sea, Central America, North America, and South America.

The MONA or Hodges number for Panoquina lucas is 4121.

== Subspecies ==
These two subspecies belong to the species Panoquina lucas:

- Panoquina lucas lucas (Fabricius, 1793)
- Panoquina lucas woodruffi Watson, 1937
