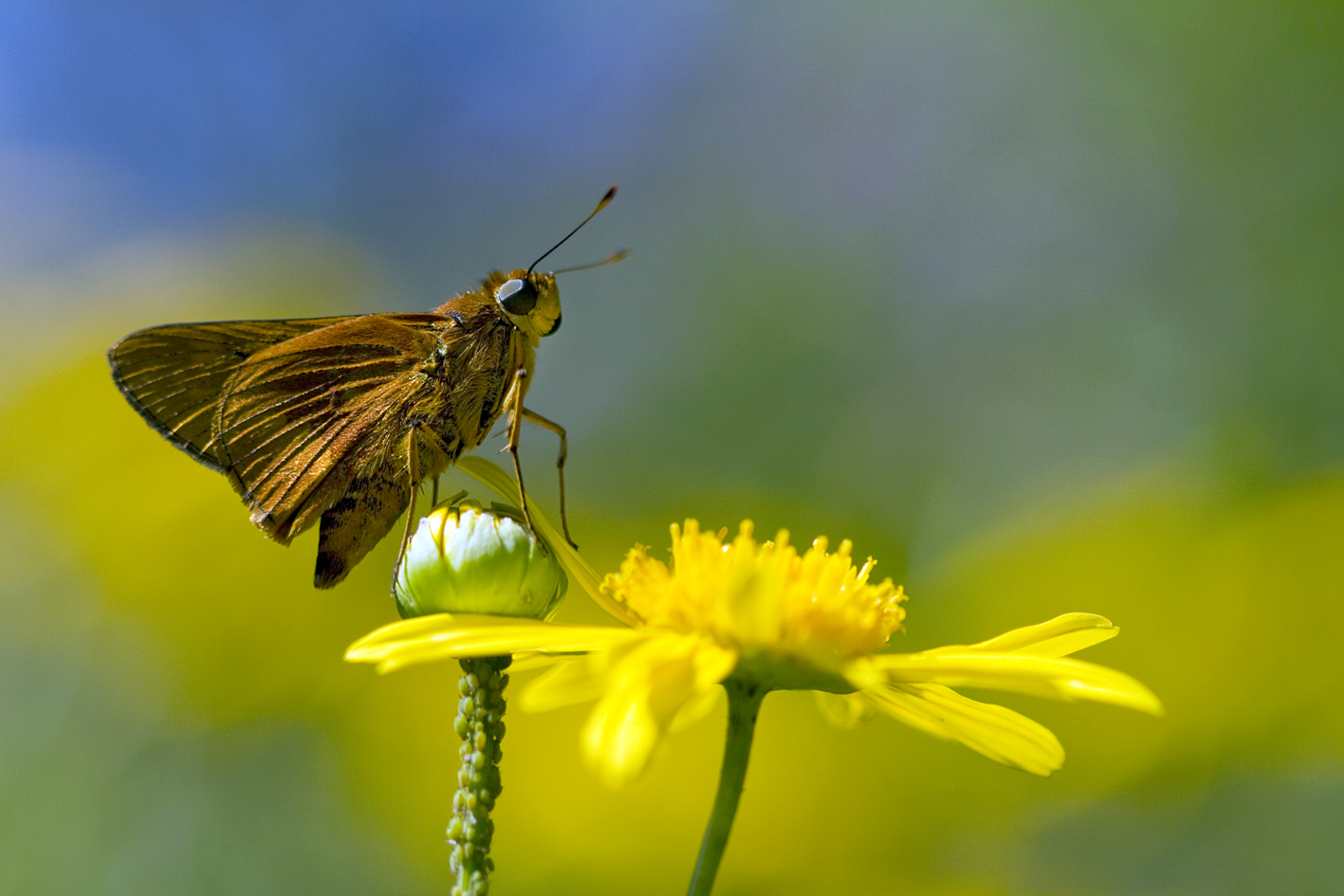
- Wandering skipper on a daisy flower

Conservation status
- Near Threatened (IUCN 2.3)

Scientific classification
- Kingdom: Animalia
- Phylum: Arthropoda
- Class: Insecta
- Order: Lepidoptera
- Family: Hesperiidae
- Genus: Panoquina
- Species: P. errans

Binomial name
- Panoquina errans (Skinner, 1892)

Synonyms
- Pamphila errans Skinner, 1892

= Wandering skipper =

Species of butterfly

The wandering skipper (Panoquina errans) is a species of butterfly in the family Hesperiidae. It is found in Mexico and the United States.

The larvae feed on Distichlis spicata.
