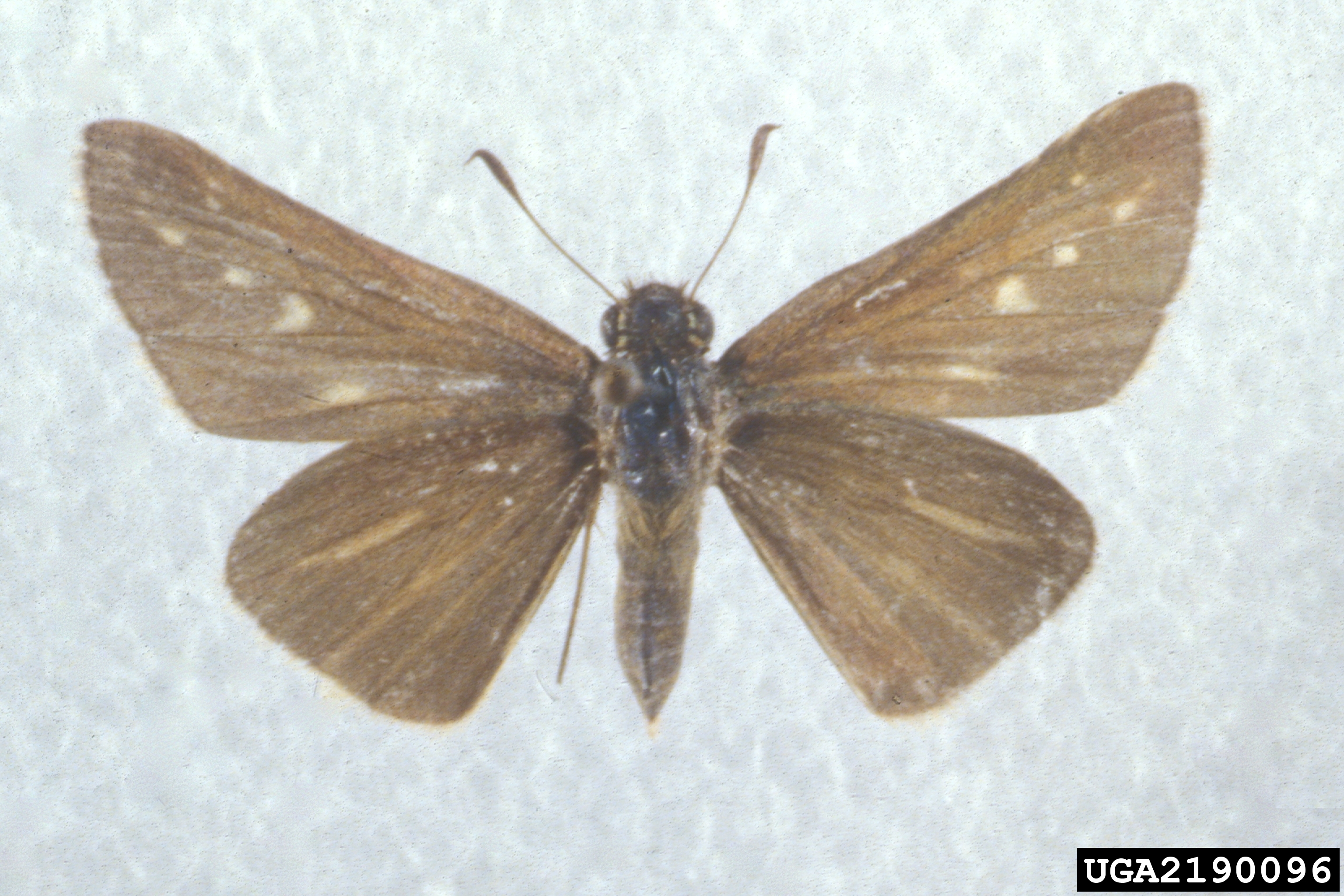

Conservation status
- Secure (NatureServe)

Scientific classification
- Kingdom: Animalia
- Phylum: Arthropoda
- Class: Insecta
- Order: Lepidoptera
- Family: Hesperiidae
- Genus: Panoquina
- Species: P. panoquin

Binomial name
- Panoquina panoquin (Scudder, 1863)

Synonyms
- Hesperia panoquin Scudder, 1863; Prenes panoquin; Hesperia ophis Edwards, 1871; Hesperia wimico Plötz, 1883; Panoquina cochles Scudder, 1889 (nomen nudum)

= Panoquina panoquin =

Species of butterfly

Panoquina panoquin, the salt marsh skipper, is a butterfly of the family Hesperiidae. It is found along the Atlantic Coast of the United States, from New York south to Florida and the Florida Keys, west along the Gulf Coast to southern Texas.

The wingspan is 35–39 mm. Adults are on wing from May to August in two generations in the north and from April to October in three generations in the south. In Florida, there are multiple generations with adults on wing from February to December. Adults feed on the flower nectar of a wide range of plants.

The larvae feed on Distichlis spicata.
