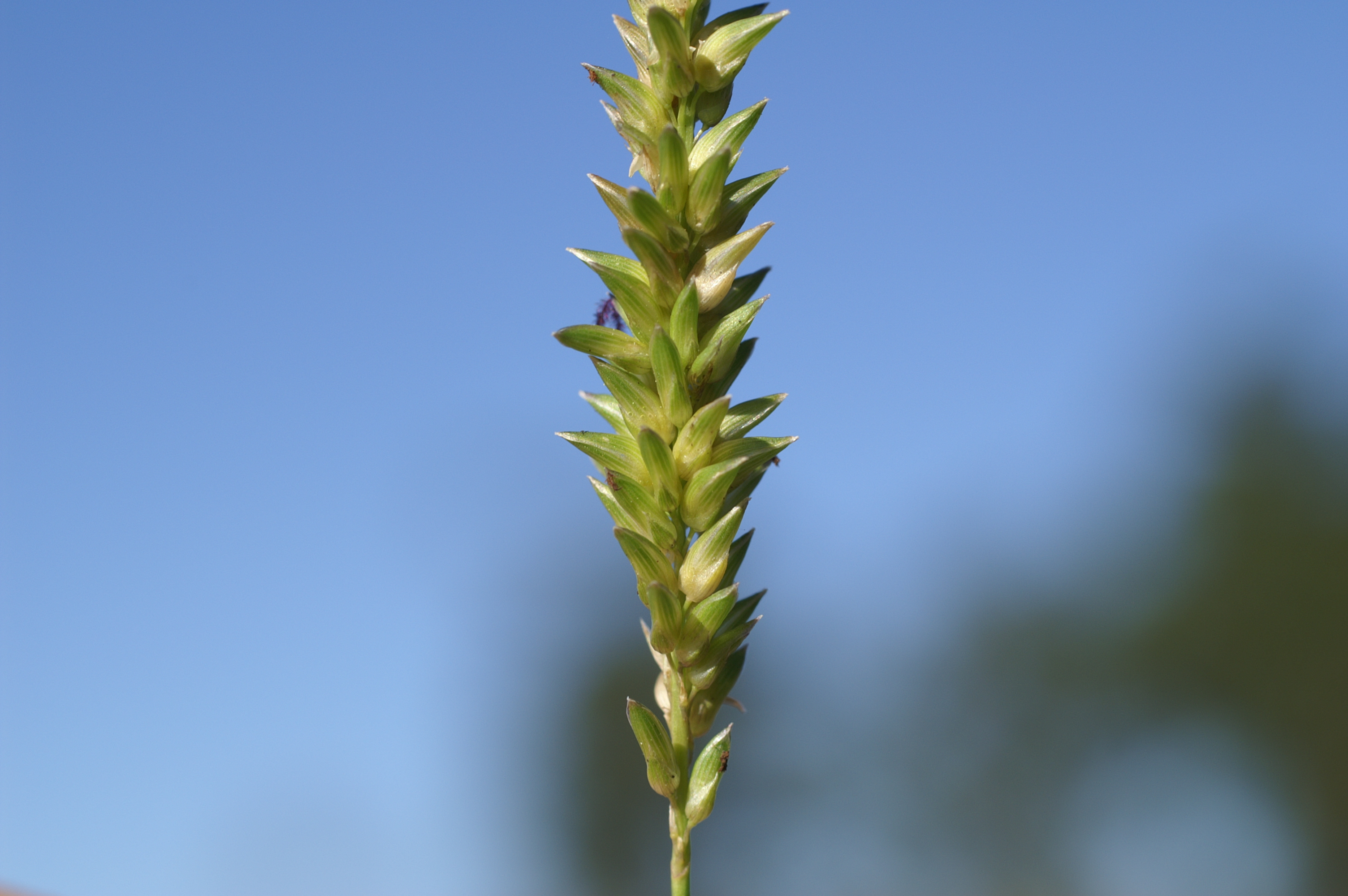
- Sacciolepis indica

Scientific classification
- Kingdom: Plantae
- Clade: Tracheophytes
- Clade: Angiosperms
- Clade: Monocots
- Clade: Commelinids
- Order: Poales
- Family: Poaceae
- Subfamily: Panicoideae
- Supertribe: Panicodae
- Tribe: Paniceae
- Genus: Sacciolepis; Nash

Type species
- Sacciolepis gibba (syn of S. striata) (Elliott) Nash

Synonyms
- Rhampholepis Stapf

= Sacciolepis =

Genus of grasses

Sacciolepis is a genus of plants in the grass family. Cupscale grass is a common name for plants in this genus.

They are widespread in tropical and warmer temperate regions. Many are native to Africa, with others in Asia, Australia, and the Americas.

These species are annual or perennial and may have rhizomes or stolons. The inflorescence is usually a narrow, dense panicle. They generally grow in moist habitat, such as marshes and streambanks. Sacciolepis is closely related to genus Panicum.

Species

- Sacciolepis africana - Africa from Senegal to KwaZulu-Natal, Madagascar
- Sacciolepis angustissima - from the Guianas to Bolivia + Peru
- Sacciolepis antsirabensis - Madagascar
- Sacciolepis arenaria - Angola
- Sacciolepis catumbensis - Angola, Zambia
- Sacciolepis chevalieri - Africa from Senegal to KwaZulu-Natal, Madagascar
- Sacciolepis ciliocincta - Africa from Senegal to Sudan + Congo Rep
- Sacciolepis cingularis - Sudan, Chad, Congo Rep
- Sacciolepis clatrata - Central African Rep
- Sacciolepis curvata - eastern + southeastern Africa from Kenya to KwaZulu-Natal; Madagascar, Comoros, Seychelles, Tamil Nadu, Sri Lanka
- Sacciolepis cymbiandra - West Africa from Senegal to Nigeria
- Sacciolepis fenestrata - Thailand
- Sacciolepis indica - glenwood grass, Chase's glenwood grass, Indian cupscale grass - Africa from Guinea to Cape Province; Madagascar, Comoros, Mauritius, Réunion, Indian Subcontinent, East + Southeast Asia, Australia; naturalized in New Zealand, southeastern USA, scattered places in Latin America and Pacific
- Sacciolepis interrupta - tropical Asia, tropical Africa
- Sacciolepis leptorachis - tropical Africa
- Sacciolepis micrococca - tropical Africa, Madagascar
- Sacciolepis myosuroides - tropical Africa, Madagascar, tropical Asia, Australia
- Sacciolepis myuros - tropical America from central Mexico to Trinidad + Bolivia
- Sacciolepis otachyrioides - Colombia (Meta), Venezuela (Amazonas, Apure, Guárico), Guyana (Rupununi), Bolivia (Beni, Santa Cruz), Brazil (Amazonas, Roraima)
- Sacciolepis seslerioides - Congo Rep, Zaire, Tanzania, Zambia, Angola
- Sacciolepis striata - southeastern USA from Texas to Delaware; Greater Antilles, Mexico (Veracruz, Tabasco), Central America, Trinidad, Venezuela, Guianas, Amapá
- Sacciolepis tenuissima - Thailand
- Sacciolepis transbarbata - Tanzania, Burundi, Zaire, Zambia, Angola, Malawi, Zimbabwe
- Sacciolepis typhura - Africa from Ivory Coast to Eswatini
- Sacciolepis viguieri - Madagascar
- Sacciolepis vilvoides - Cuba, South America from Venezuela to Uruguay

formerly included

see Hymenachne Panicum

- Sacciolepis aurita - Panicum auritum
- Sacciolepis donacifolia - Hymenachne donacifolia
- Sacciolepis insulicola - Panicum auritum
- Sacciolepis longissima - Panicum longissimum
- Sacciolepis polymorpha - Panicum auritum
- Sacciolepis semienensis - Panicum hymeniochilum
