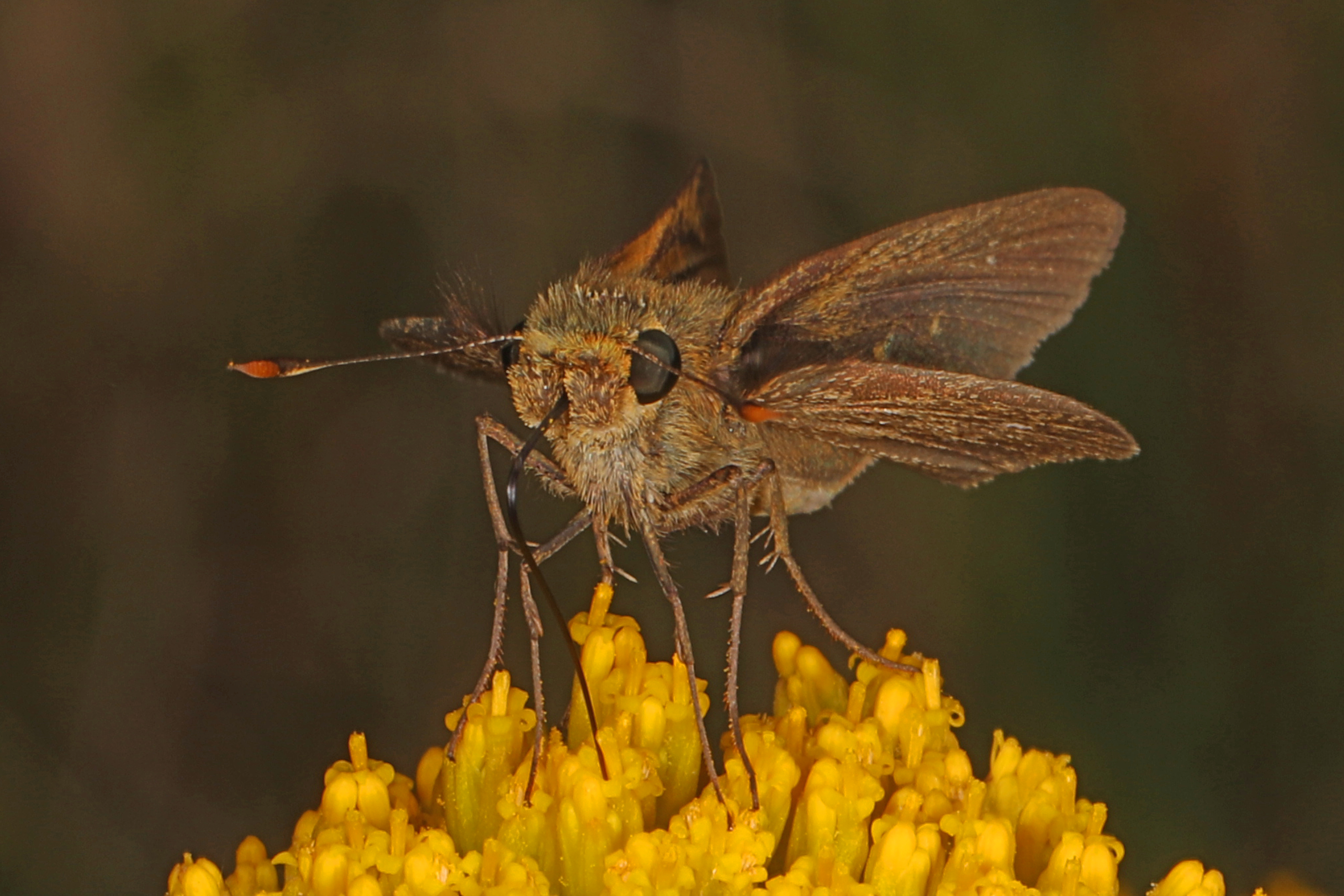

Scientific classification
- Kingdom: Animalia
- Phylum: Arthropoda
- Class: Insecta
- Order: Lepidoptera
- Family: Hesperiidae
- Genus: Panoquina
- Species: P. panoquinoides

Binomial name
- Panoquina panoquinoides (Skinner, 1891)

= Panoquina panoquinoides =

Species of butterfly

Panoquina panoquinoides, known generally as the obscure skipper or beach skipper, is a species of grass skipper in the butterfly family Hesperiidae. It is found in the Caribbean Sea, North America, and South America.

== Subspecies ==
These four subspecies belong to the species Panoquina panoquinoides:

- Panoquina panoquinoides calna Evans, 1955
- Panoquina panoquinoides eugeon Godman & Salvin, 1896
- Panoquina panoquinoides minima de Jong, 1983
- Panoquina panoquinoides panoquinoides (Skinner, 1891)
