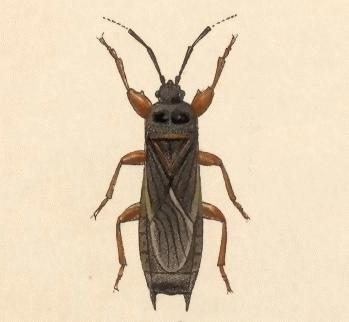

Scientific classification
- Domain: Eukaryota
- Kingdom: Animalia
- Phylum: Arthropoda
- Class: Insecta
- Order: Hemiptera
- Suborder: Heteroptera
- Family: Blissidae
- Genus: Toonglasa; Distant, 1893
- Species: T. forficuloides

Binomial name
- Toonglasa forficuloides Distant, 1893

Synonyms
- Extarademus Slater and Wilcox, 1966

= Toonglasa =

Genus of true bugs

Toonglasa is a genus of true bugs in the family Blissidae. There is one described species in Toonglasa, T. forficuloides.
