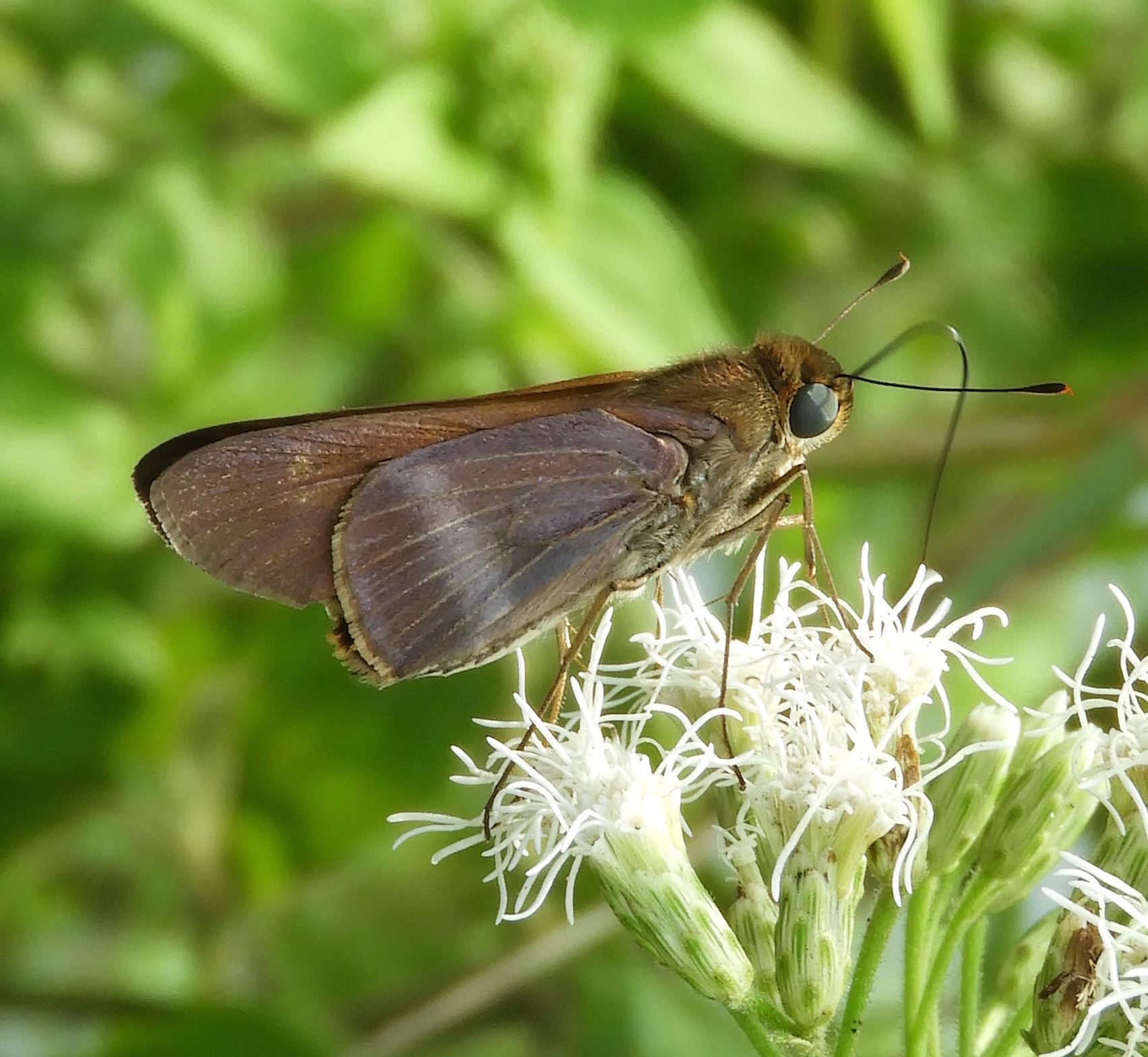

Scientific classification
- Kingdom: Animalia
- Phylum: Arthropoda
- Clade: Pancrustacea
- Class: Insecta
- Order: Lepidoptera
- Family: Hesperiidae
- Genus: Panoquina
- Species: P. evansi

Binomial name
- Panoquina evansi (H. Freeman, 1946)

= Panoquina evansi =

Species of butterfly

Panoquina evansi, or Evans's skipper, is a species of grass skipper in the butterfly family Hesperiidae.
