= Cavelerius =

Scientific classification
- Kingdom: Animalia
- Phylum: Arthropoda
- Class: Insecta
- Order: Hemiptera
- Suborder: Heteroptera
- Family: Blissidae
- Genus: Cavelerius; Distant, 1903

Genus of true bugs

Cavelerius is a genus of Asian seed bugs in the family Blissidae. A review by Gao and Zhou (2021) listed 13 total species, including 3 newly discovered species. The insects of this genus feed by sucking the sap out of the stems and leaves of grasses and grass-like plants. The species C. saccharivorus is a major pest of sugarcane in Southeast Asia and Japan, and the species C. excavatus and C. sweeti are major pests of sugarcane in India.

== List of species ==
- Cavelerius antennatus Slater & Miyamoto, 1963
- Cavelerius excavatus Distant, 1901 - black bug of sugarcane
- Cavelerius illustris Distant, 1903 (type species)
- Cavelerius minor Slater & Miyamoto, 1963
- Cavelerius mishmiensis Slater & Miyamoto, 1963
- Cavelerius nigrivena Gao & Zhou, 2021
- Cavelerius nigrolimbatus Slater & Miyamoto, 1963
- Cavelerius obscuratus Slater & Miyamoto, 1963
- Cavelerius parvimaculatus Gao & Zhou, 2021
- Cavelerius sweeti Slater & Miyamoto, 1963
- Cavelerius saccharivorus Okajima, 1922 - oriental chinch bug
- Cavelerius tinctus Distant, 1903
- Cavelerius yunnanensis Gao & Zhou, 2021
