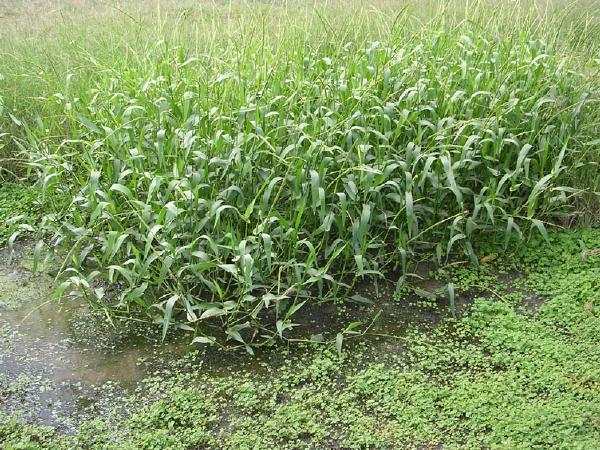
- Hymenachne amplexicaulis

Scientific classification
- Kingdom: Plantae
- Clade: Tracheophytes
- Clade: Angiosperms
- Clade: Monocots
- Clade: Commelinids
- Order: Poales
- Family: Poaceae
- Subfamily: Panicoideae
- Supertribe: Andropogonodae
- Tribe: Paspaleae
- Subtribe: Otachyriinae
- Genus: Hymenachne; P.Beauv.

Synonyms
- Dallwatsonia B.K.Simon; Panicum sect. Hymenachnae (P.Beauv.) Hack.

= Hymenachne =

Genus of grasses

Hymenachne, synonym Dallwatsonia, is a genus of widespread wetland plants in the grass family Poaceae. They are commonly known as marsh grasses. They are distributed in tropical and subtropical regions of Asia, the Americas, and the Pacific Islands. A species from the Americas, H. amplexicaulis, is well known in other parts of the world as an introduced and invasive species.

== Description ==
Hymenachne species are aquatic plants frequently found in marshes and other wet habitats. Their stems may be spongy with aerenchyma tissue. The longest stems can reach 4 m (13 ft). They are perennial, sometimes with rhizomes. The leaves are linear or lance-shaped. The inflorescence is usually a cylindrical, spike-shaped panicle, rarely with branches.

== Taxonomy ==
The genus Hymenachne was first described by Palisot de Beauvois in 1812. Hymenachne is similar to the genus Sacciolepis, first described in 1901. Both were formerly considered part of Panicum. Many species placed in Hymenachne have previously been placed in Sacciolepis.

In 1992, Bryan Kenneth Simon described a new genus Dallwatsonia for a single new Australian species he called Dallwatsonia felliana. The genus was named for the Australian botanists Michael Dallwitz and Leslie Watson. In 2014, ten further species were transferred from Panicum to Dallwatsonia by José Ramón Grande Allende, who noted that Dallwatsonia was closely related to Hymenachne, but could be distinguished by hollow rather than filled culms. However, a molecular phylogenetic study published in 2014 supported the synonymy of Dallwatsonia and Hymenachne, a conclusion also supported in a 2019 study. As of November 2024, Plants of the World Online accepted Dallwatsonia as a synonym of Hymenachne.

=== Species ===
As of November 2024, the following species were accepted:

- Hymenachne amplexicaulis (Rudge) Nees – West Indian marsh grass, olive hymenachne – West Indies; Latin America from Mexico to Uruguay; naturalized in Australia, parts of Asia, Florida
- Hymenachne assamica (Hook.f.) Hitchc. - China, Assam, Myanmar, Thailand
- Hymenachne aurita (J.Presl ex Nees) Balansa
- Hymenachne bresolinii (L.B.Sm. & Wassh.) Zuloaga
- Hymenachne condensata (Bertol.) Chase
- Hymenachne donacifolia (Raddi) Chase - Cuba, Puerto Rico, Trinidad; Latin America from Honduras to Paraguay
- Hymenachne felliana (B.K.Simon) Zuloaga
- Hymenachne grandis (Hitchc. & Chase) Zuloaga
- Hymenachne grumosa (Nees) Zuloaga - Paraguay, Uruguay, Brazil, Argentina
- Hymenachne harleyi (Salariato, Morrone & Zuloaga) Zuloaga
- Hymenachne leptachne (Döll) Zuloaga
- Hymenachne longa (Hitchc. & Chase) Zuloaga
- Hymenachne panduranganii J.Remya & Geethakum.
- Hymenachne patens L.Liu - China (Anhui, Fujian, Jiangxi)
- Hymenachne pernambucensis (Spreng.) Zuloaga - Paraguay, Uruguay, Brazil, Argentina
- Hymenachne stagnatilis (Hitchc. & Chase) Zuloaga
- Hymenachne wombaliensis Vanderyst ex Robyns - Zaïre

Formerly included

- Hymenachne boiviniana – Panicum boivinianum
- Hymenachne campestris – Sacciolepis vilvoides
- Hymenachne fluviatilis – Sacciolepis vilvoides
- Hymenachne frondescens – Ocellochloa stolonifera
- Hymenachne indica – Sacciolepis indica
- Hymenachne interrupta – Sacciolepis interrupta
- Hymenachne leptostachya – Ocellochloa pulchella
- Hymenachne montana – Cenchrus mutilatus
- Hymenachne myosuroides – Sacciolepis myosuroides
- Hymenachne myosurus – Sacciolepis myuros
- Hymenachne myuros – Sacciolepis myuros
- Hymenachne phalarioides – Sacciolepis indica
- Hymenachne phleiformis – Sacciolepis myuros
- Hymenachne striata – Sacciolepis striata
