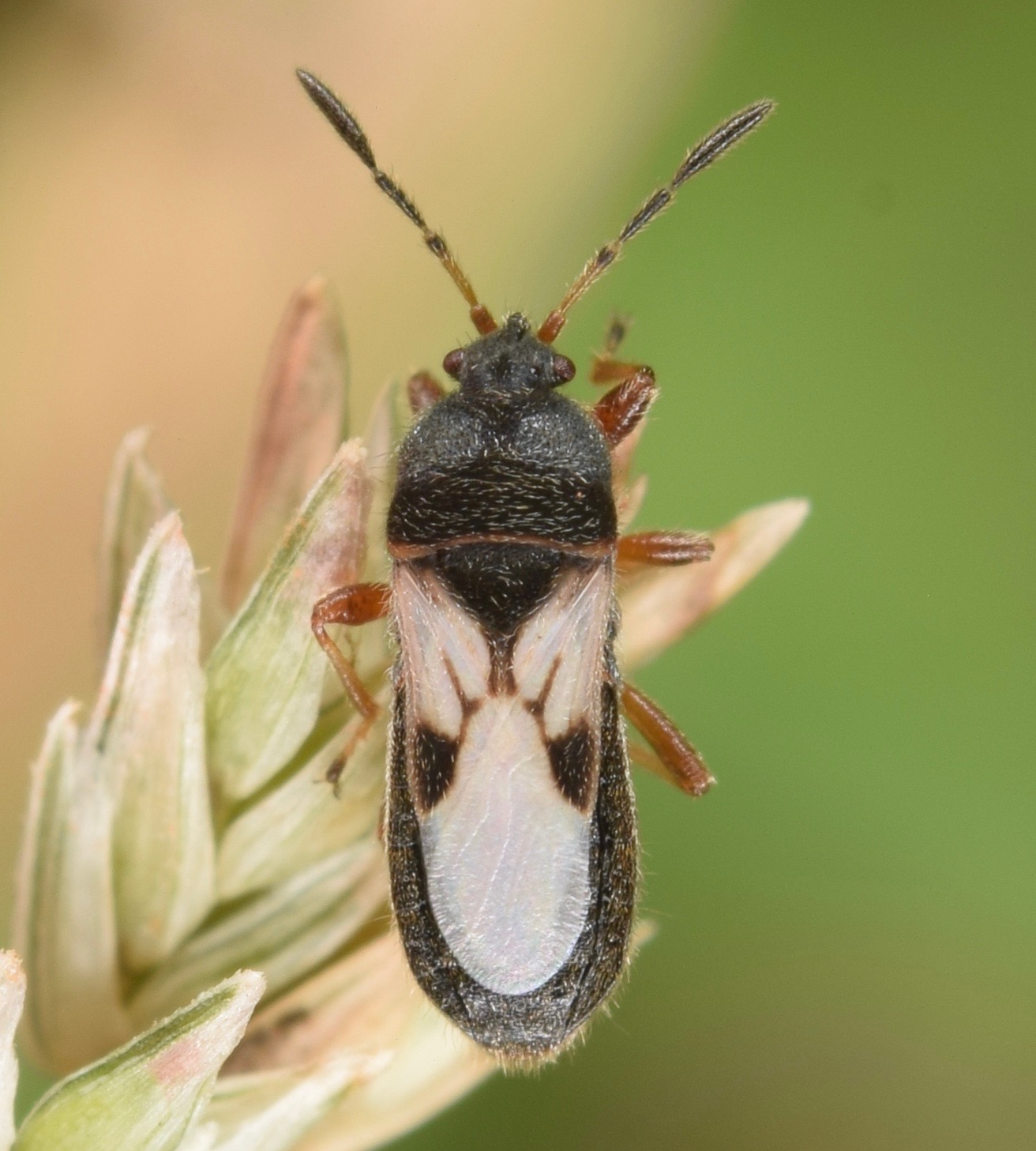

Scientific classification
- Kingdom: Animalia
- Phylum: Arthropoda
- Class: Insecta
- Order: Hemiptera
- Suborder: Heteroptera
- Family: Blissidae
- Genus: Blissus
- Species: B. leucopterus

Binomial name
- Blissus leucopterus (Say, 1832)

Synonyms
- Lygaeus leucopterus Say, 1832

= Blissus leucopterus =

Species of insect

Blissus leucopterus, also known as the true chinch bug, is a small North American insect in the order Hemiptera and family Blissidae. It is the most commonly encountered species of the genus Blissus, which are all known as chinch bugs. A closely related species is B. insularis, the southern chinch bug.

The name of the chinch bug is derived from the Spanish chinche, which refers to the bed bug and is in turn derived from the Latin cimex. The chinch bug is not related to the bed bug, but took this name on account of producing a similar smell to that of bed bugs when crushed.

These bugs tend to gather on sunny, open patches of turfgrass. Due to their small size, chinch bugs are hardly noticeable, so they become problems, since they are considered pests that feed on stems of turfgrass and grain crops.

== Identification ==
B. leucopterus is about 4 mm (0.16 in) long when fully developed. The adults' bodies vary in colour from dark red to brown with white wings and red legs. Young nymphs are usually bright red and half the size of adults. A distinguishable feature is the white band found on the nymph's abdomen. This band will be covered with wings and changes colour to black during development.

== Distribution ==
B. leucopterus is native to the Americas. The species is found throughout the US, southern Canada, Mexico, and Central America.

== Diet ==
Chinch bugs feed on plants, both wild and cultivated, belonging to the grass family, such as wheat, rye, barley, oats, and corn. They suck the sap out of the growing plants. When the plants ripen or become dry, they travel to other growing plants to feed.

== Lifecycle ==
The lifespan of the B. leucopterus is a typically less than one year. The eggs of two generations are laid down from spring to summer, when they develop into adults. During the fall, the adults from the first generation die off, while the adults from the second generation retreat from the crops to look for overwinter shelters. The adults overwinter in any type of shelters they can find, including in hedgerows, road sides, bushy fence rows, edges of woodlands, and soybean stubble, under tree barks and bunch grass, and inside field mice nests. Once they emerge from their hibernation, they return to the crop fields to feed and breed before their death.

B. leucopterus prefers hot, dry, and sunny conditions, while moist, warm, and humid conditions are detrimental for their population; these conditions promote the growth of a fungus that is fatal to them. Another element that reduces their population is heavy rain. Developing nymphs that are hit with rain become trapped in the soil, killing them. Their natural predators include the big-eye bug (Geocoris bullatus), and the tiny wasp (Eumicrosoma beneficum), which feed on or parasitize them.

=== Time line ===
- December – March: in hibernation
- March – April: As daytime temperatures stay above 20 °C for a few hours, the bugs emerge from hibernation and begin mating.
- April – May: The adults fly to fields with small grains growing (such as wheat) and start sucking the sap out of them. They continue to mate, and the females begin laying eggs on the lower leaves or the roots of plants. They continue to do so for the next 30 days, laying about 200 eggs.
- June: The nymphs develop for the next 30 days until they mature into adults. They are wingless, reddish in color, and progressively darken with each moult until they have reached their adult stage with fully developed wings. The nymphs also feed on the same growing plant until it starts to ripen. This causes the bugs to seek out other growing crops (such as corn).
- July - October: The chinch bugs feed and breed on the new growing plant, and lay a second generation. They continue to feed on the crops, and the second generation becomes fully mature.
- November: The chinch bugs retreat from the crops to look for shelter for overwinter.

== Human impact ==
The chinch bug, a native to the United States and common in Midwestern states, has had a great effect on agriculture. It naturally feeds on wild prairie grasses. As the Midwestern states were settled in the 19th century, and crops of wheat, corn, sorghum, and other grain grasses were planted, they adapted well to these new species as habitat and food species. Throughout the 20th century, the chinch bug was a major pest to farmers, as it quickly decimated corn or wheat fields. To deal with this problem, many farmers in the area changed their crops to soybeans, which were not a host to the chinch bug. This led to a huge decrease in the chinch bug population in this area. Today, they are mostly a common lawn pest and are commonly treated with pesticides and pest-resistant grasses.

== Other reading ==
- Waldbauer, Gilbert, Insights from Insects, What Bad Bugs Can Teach Us. 2005. Prometheus Books, New York, 219–232.
