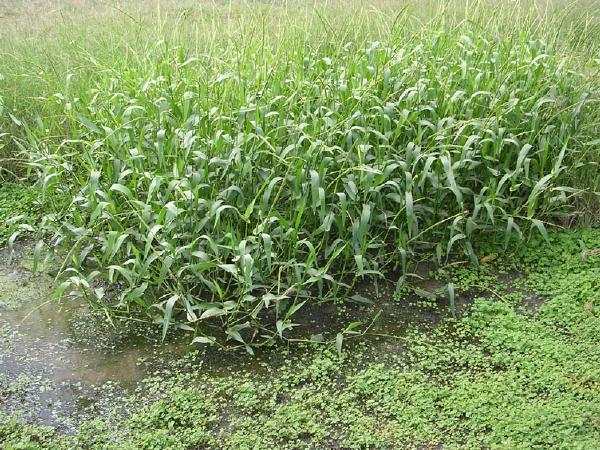

Scientific classification
- Kingdom: Plantae
- Clade: Tracheophytes
- Clade: Angiosperms
- Clade: Monocots
- Clade: Commelinids
- Order: Poales
- Family: Poaceae
- Subfamily: Panicoideae
- Genus: Hymenachne
- Species: H. amplexicaulis

Binomial name
- Hymenachne amplexicaulis (Rudge) Nees

= Hymenachne amplexicaulis =

Species of plant

Hymenachne amplexicaulis, also known as West Indian marsh grass in the US, Olive hymenachne in Australia, and hereafter referred to as hymenachne, is New World species in the genus Hymenachne. Hymenachne is from the Greek hymen meaning "membrane" and achne meaning "chaff, glume, scale" and amplexicaulis is from Latin, literally "embracing the stem" or "stem-clasping. This freshwater species is native to the tropical and subtropical regions of the West Indies, Northern South America, and Central America.

== Biology ==
Hymenachne is a perennial grass that primarily reproduces via stolons. This robust species is commonly found growing 1–2.5m tall. The stems are hairless and float prostrate across the top of the water, then grow upright from these bases to support leaves. The flat, triangular leaves (10–45 cm long, up to 3 cm wide) have a prominent clasping bases, or auricles. The auricles help to distinguish it from other invasive wetland grasses and the native H. acutigluma in Australia. Hymenachne has been shown to increase the stem length between nodes to keep leaves above water during periods of flooding. Its stem is packed with airy tissue called aerenchyma to help the stems float and to aid in flood tolerability.

Hymenachne flowers in the early fall and seeds in late fall. The flower is a panicle that can grow to half a meter. Researchers at the University of Florida have seen multiple panicles per plant originating from branching at a single node. Hymenachne can produce thousands of seeds with up to 98% germination right off the panicle.

== Habitat ==
Hymenachne prefers constantly inundated soil and is known to survive comfortably in about a meter of water for 20 years. This species was shown to survive poorly in Australia where flooding exceeded 1.2 m. In its native range in Venezuela, and in invaded areas of Florida, hymenachne was documented to survive in >1.2m of water for nearly a year. Hymenachne has also been found in water greater than 4m deep persisting in floating mats, likely dislodged after a storm event. Conversely, hymenachne is not recorded to survive sites that entirely desiccate.

Hymenachne is known to colonize and form dense monocultures in floodplains, roadside ditches, and lake margins in invaded and native areas. It is often found colonizing areas with little shading and competition from other species. Although limited information is available on soil preferences of hymenachne, it has been found in deep, poorly drained muck soils in Florida. It is not found in waters with a significant salt concentration.

== Invasion ==
There have been three introductions of hymenachne into Australia, one in Florida, and one in Louisiana. Australia now lists hymenachne as one of the top twenty worst weeds. Hymenachne invasions have been shown to decrease species richness, increase invasive fish populations, and overall cause fundamental changes in floral and faunal composition in Australia. Hymenachne was introduced in Australia as forage for cattle, and likely for the same reason in Florida. The species was used in ponded pastures, or artificial ponds created to hold water for use in the dry season. High reproducibility from stem fragments aids in the dispersal and invasion of this species. The first herbarium record of hymenachne in Florida is from 1957. The second specimen is not recorded until 1977. The cause for this gap is unknown; however, today it is recorded in 28 counties across the state.
