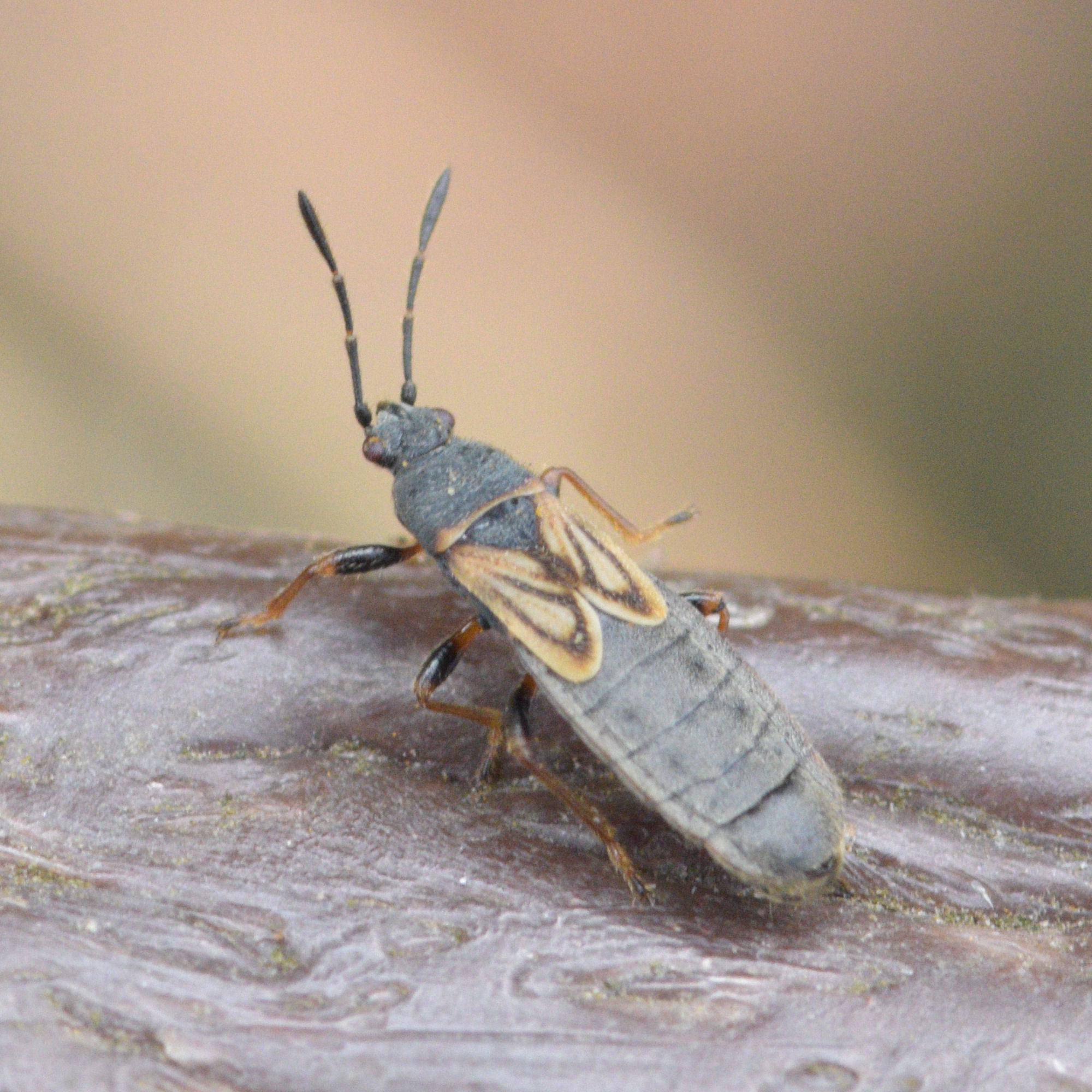
- Ischnodemus sabuleti

Scientific classification
- Kingdom: Animalia
- Phylum: Arthropoda
- Class: Insecta
- Order: Hemiptera
- Suborder: Heteroptera
- Infraorder: Pentatomomorpha
- Superfamily: Lygaeoidea
- Family: Blissidae; Stål, 1862

= Blissidae =

Family of true bugs

The Blissidae are a family in the Hemiptera (true bugs), comprising over 400 species. The group has often been treated as a subfamily of the Lygaeidae but was resurrected as a full family by Thomas Henry (1997).

The adult insects are elongate, typically four times as long as broad, and in some species, up to seven times. Short wings are common in many species.

All the species feed on the sap of plants, mostly grasses, and most of the species live between the sheaths of leaves. The most economically important species is the true chinch bug, Blissus leucopterus, a destructive pest of corn crops in the United States.

== List of genera ==
These following genera of the family Blissidae are listed in the Lygaeoidea Species File:

1. Aradacrates Slater & Wilcox, 1969
2. Aradademus Slater, 1967
3. Archaeodemus Slater, 1986
4. Atrademus Slater, 1967
5. Aulacoblissus Slater, 1986
6. Australodemus Slater & Sweet, 1963
7. Barademus Slater, 1967
8. Barrerablissus Brailovsky, 2015
9. Blissiella Slater, 1967
10. Blissus Burmeister, 1835 (chinch bugs)
11. Bochrus Stål, 1861
12. Brailovskyodemus Henry & Dellapé, 2024
13. Capodemus Slater & Sweet, 1972
14. Cavelerius Distant, 1903
15. Caveloblissus Slater & Wilcox, 1968
16. Chelochirus Spinola, 1839
17. Cundinablissus Brailovsky, 2022
18. Dentisblissus Slater, 1961
19. Dimorphopterus Stål, 1872
20. †Eoblissus Garrouste, Schubnel & Nel, 2019
21. Extarademus Slater & Wilcox, 1966
22. Extaramorphus Slater, Ashlock & Wilcox, 1969
23. Gelastoblissus Slater & Wilcox, 1969
24. Hasanobochrus Ghauri, 1982
25. Heinsius (bug) Distant, 1901
26. Heteroblissus Barber, 1954
27. Howdenoblissus Stys, 1991
28. Iphicrates (bug) Distant, 1903
29. Ischnocoridea Horváth, 1893
30. Ischnodemus Fieber, 1837
31. Lemuriblissus Slater, 1967
32. Lucerocoris Slater, 1968
33. Macchiademus Slater & Wilcox, 1973
34. Macropes Motschulsky, 1859
35. Merinademus Slater, 1967
36. Metafemorademus Henry & Dellapé, 2024
37. Micaredemus Slater, 1967
38. Napoblissus Brailovsky & Barrera, 2012
39. Patritius Distant, 1901
40. Pirkimerus Distant, 1904
41. Praeblissus Barber, 1949
42. Praetorblissus Slater, 1966
43. Procellademus Slater & Wilcox, 1966
44. Propinquidemus Slater, 1986
45. Prosternademus Henry & Dellapé, 2024
46. †Prosthoblissus Boderau, Nel & Engel, 2025
47. Pseudoblissus Slater, 1979
48. Ramadademus Slater, 1967
49. Reticulatodemus Slater & Wilcox, 1966
50. Riggiella Kormilev, 1949
51. Scansidemus Slater & Wilcox, 1969
52. Scintillademus Slater, 1968
53. Slaterellus Drake & Davis, 1959
54. Spalacocoris Stål, 1874
55. Talpoblissus Slater & Wilcox, 1973
56. Toonglasa Distant, 1893
57. Tympanoblissus Dellapé & Minghetti, 2020
58. Wheelerodemus Henry & Sweet, 2015
59. Xenoblissus Barber, 1954
