= List of butterflies of the Amazon River basin and the Andes =

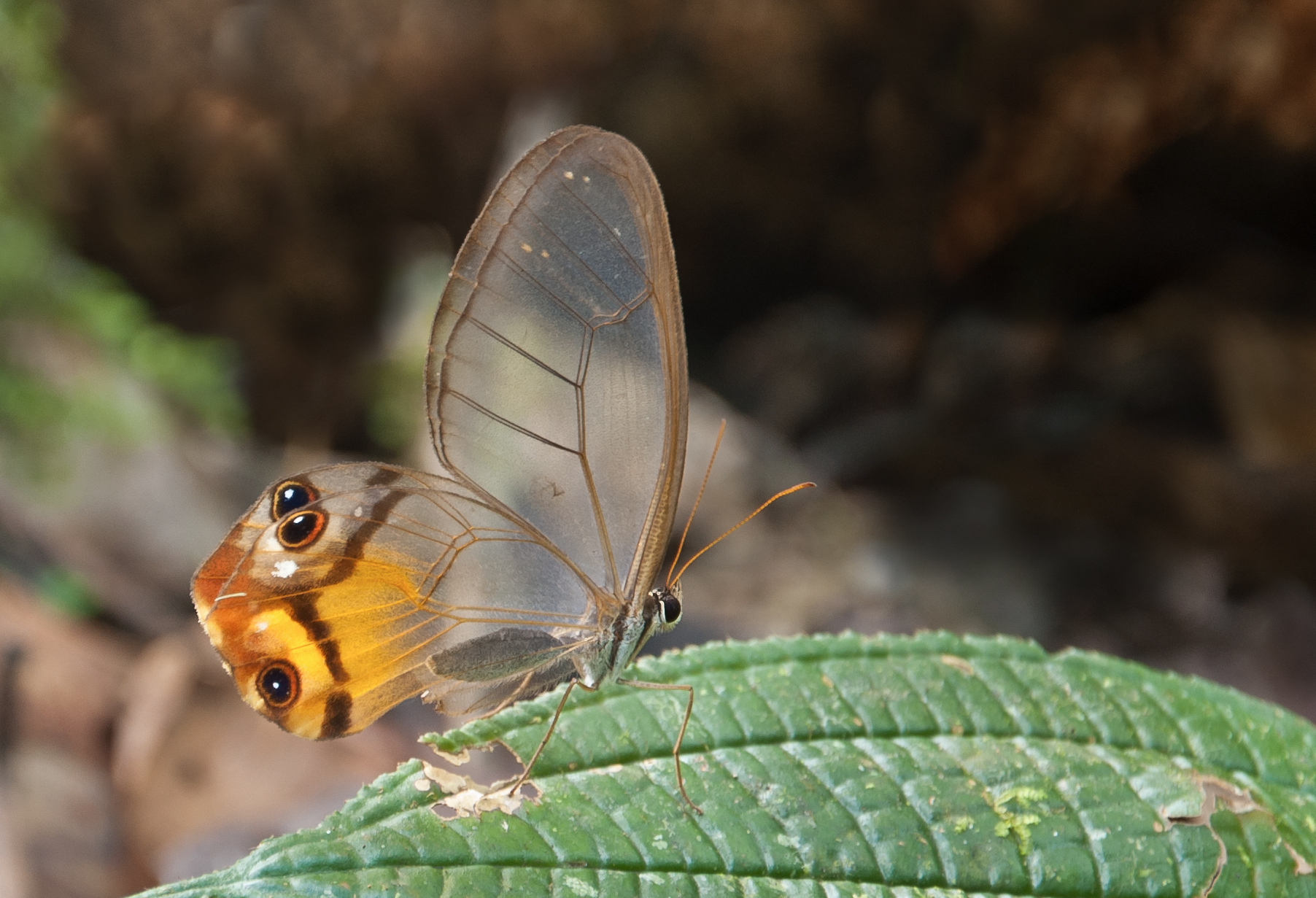
A glasswing butterfly Haetera piera, Canaima National Park, Venezuela

This is a list of butterflies of the Amazon River basin and the Andes.

The Amazon River basin may be the most speciose region for butterflies. Nine countries have territory in the Amazon River basin or immediately adjoin this region: Brazil, Bolivia, Peru, Ecuador, Colombia, Venezuela, Guyana, Suriname, and French Guiana. The Andes extend from north to south through seven South American countries: Venezuela, Colombia, Ecuador, Peru, Bolivia, Chile, and Argentina. The fauna of the Andes is also diverse. Both regions have many endemic species. South America as a whole constitutes the Neotropical realm. Habitats in these two regions are very various and include Amazon rainforest, Atlantic forest, Llanos grasslands, Puna grassland and Valdivian temperate forests. Peru east of the Andes is regarded as the most important biodiversity hotspot in the world. The two regions (Amazon and Andes) are South America proper excluding the pampas plains of Uruguay and Paraguay which have a distinct butterfly fauna.

Isolation has led to the evolution of endemic higher taxa. Instances are Ithomiinae, Dismorphiinae, Phyciodina, Pyrrhopygini, Eumaeini (over 1,000 species), Pronophilina and Eudaminae. Endemic genera (among very many) include Morpho, Agrias, Prepona Caligo, Cithaerias, Catagramma, Parides, Hamadryas, Nessaea, Marpesia, Melanis Mesosemia, Symmachia, Evenus, Memphis, Pierella, and Astraptes. Other higher taxa are most speciose in the Neotropics, for instance Riodininae. Many species, notably Heliconius, are members of complex mimicry rings. Adaptive radiation has led to many species being geographically diverse. Examples are Consul fabius and Mechanitis lysimnia.

Notable entomologists associated with Neotropical butterflies are Jean-Baptiste Godart, Henry Walter Bates, William Chapman Hewitson, Hans Fruhstorfer, Otto Staudinger, Karl Jordan and Walter Rothschild, Anton Hermann Fassl, Hermann Burmeister, William Schaus, Eugène Le Moult, Richard Haensch, Gustav Weymer, Ferdinand Heinrich Hermann Strecker, Andrey Avinoff, Carlos Berg, and Vladimir Nabokov.

== Papilionidae ==
=== Papilioninae ===
- Battus belus (Cramer, [1777])
- Battus ingenuus (Dyar, 1907)
- Battus laodamas (C. Felder & R. Felder, 1859)
- Battus lycidas (Cramer, [1777])
- Battus madyes (Doubleday, 1846)
- Battus polydamas (Linnaeus, 1758)
- Battus polystictus (Butler, 1874)
- Eurytides bellerophon (Dalman, 1823)
- Eurytides callias (Rothschild & Jordan, 1906)
- Eurytides columbus (Kollar, 1850)
- Eurytides dolicaon (Cramer, [1775])
- Eurytides iphitas Hübner, 1821
- Eurytides orabilis (Butler, 1872)
- Eurytides serville (Godart, 1824)
- Mimoides ariarathes (Esper, 1788)
- Mimoides euryleon (Hewitson, [1856])
- Mimoides ilus (Fabricius, 1793)
- Mimoides lysithous ( Hübner, [1821])
- Mimoides microdamas (Burmeister, 1878)
- Mimoides pausanias (Hewitson, 1852)
- Mimoides phaon (Boisduval, 1836)
- Mimoides protodamas (Godart, 1819)
- Mimoides xeniades (Hewitson, 1867)
- Mimoides xynias (Hewitson, 1875)
- Papilio androgeus Cramer, [1775]
- Papilio anchisiades Esper, 1788
- Papilio astyalus Godart, 1819
- Papilio chiansiades Westwood, 1872
- Papilio cresphontes Cramer, [1777]
- Papilio garleppi Staudinger, 1892
- Papilio homothoas Rothschild & Karl Jordan, 1906
- Papilio menatius (Hübner, [1819])
- Papilio warscewiczii Hopffer, 1866
- Papilio paeon Boisduval, 1836
- Papilio neyi Niepelt, 1909
- Papilio zagreus Doubleday, 1847
- Papilio bachus C. Felder & R. Felder, 1865
- Papilio thoas Linnaeus, 1771
- Papilio torquatus Cramer, [1777]
- Papilio hectorides Esper, 1794
- Papilio himeros Hopffer, 1866
- Papilio lamarchei Staudinger, 1892
- Papilio birchallii Hewitson, 1863
- Papilio hellanichus Hewitson, 1868
- Papilio scamander Boisduval, 1836
- Papilio xanthopleura Godman & Salvin, 1868
- Papilio cacicus Lucas, 1852
- Papilio euterpinus Osbert Salvin & Godman, 1868
- Parides agavus (Drury, 1782)
- Parides ascanius (Cramer, [1775])
- Parides bunichus (Hübner, [1821])
- Parides phalaecus (Hewitson, 1869)
- Parides proneus (Hübner, [1831])
- Parides klagesi (Ehrmann, 1904)
- Parides chabrias (Hewitson, 1852)
- Parides coelus (Boisduval, 1836)
- Parides hahneli (Staudinger, 1882)
- Parides mithras (Grose-Smith, 1902)
- Parides pizarro (Staudinger, 1884)
- Parides quadratus (Staudinger, 1890)
- Parides vercingetorix (Oberthür, 1888)
- Parides aeneas (Linnaeus, 1758)
- Parides aglaope (Gray, [1853])
- Parides burchellanus (Westwood, 1872)
- Parides echemon (Hübner, [1813])
- Parides eurimedes (Stoll, [1782])
- Parides lysander (Cramer, [1775])
- Parides neophilus (Geyer, 1837)
- Parides orellana (Hewitson, 1852)
- Parides panthonus (Cramer, [1780])
- Parides tros (Fabricius, 1793)
- Parides zacynthus (Fabricius, 1793)
- Parides childrenae (Gray, 1832)
- Parides sesostris (Cramer, [1779])
- Parides anchises (Linnaeus, 1758)
- Parides cutorina (Staudinger, 1898)
- Parides erithalion (Boisduval, 1836)
- Parides iphidamas (Fabricius, 1793)
- Parides panares (Gray, [1853])
- Parides phosphorus (H. W. Bates, 1861)
- Parides vertumnus (Cramer, [1779])
- Parides vertumnus (Cramer, [1779])
- Protesilaus aguiari (d'Almeida, 1937)
- Protesilaus earis (Rothschild & Jordan, 1906) - Rothschild's swordtail
- Protesilaus glaucolaus (H. W. Bates, 1864) - Bates' swordtail
- Protesilaus helios (Rothschild & Jordan, 1906)
- Protesilaus leucosilaus (J. Zikán, 1937)
- Protesilaus macrosilaus (Gray, [1853])
- Protesilaus molops (Rothschild & Jordan, 1906)
- Protesilaus orthosilaus (Weymer, 1899)
- Protesilaus protesilaus (Linnaeus, 1758)
- Protesilaus stenodesmus (Rothschild & Jordan, 1906)
- Protesilaus telesilaus (C. Felder & R. Felder, 1864) - telesilaus kite

== Riodinidae ==
- Adelotypa argiella (Bates, 1868)
- Adelotypa asemna (Stichel, 1910)
- Adelotypa bolena (Butler, 1867)
- Adelotypa borsippa (Hewitson, 1863)
- Adelotypa curulis (Hewitson, 1874)
- Adelotypa densemaculata (Hewitson, 1870)
- Adelotypa glauca (Godman & Salvin, [1886])
- Adelotypa malca (Schaus, 1902)
- Adelotypa mollis (Butler, 1877)
- Adelotypa penthea (Cramer, [1777])
- Adelotypa sejuncta (Stichel, 1910)
- Adelotypa tinea (Bates, 1868)
- Adelotypa trinitatis (Lathy, 1932)
- Adelotypa zerna (Hewitson, 1872)
- Alesa amesis (Cramer, 1777)
- Alesa fournierae Lathy, 1958
- Alesa hemiurga Bates, 1867
- Alesa lipara Bates, 1867
- Alesa prema (Godart, [1824])
- Alesa rothschildi (Seitz, [1917])
- Alesa telephae (Boisduval, 1836)
- Alesa thelydrias Bates, 1867
- Alesa telephae (Boisduval, 1836)
- Amarynthis meneria (Cramer, [1776])
- Amphiselenis Staudinger, [1888] 1 sp.
- Ancyluris Hübner, [1819] 15 spp.
- Ancyluris meliboeus (Fabricius, 1777)
- Ancyluris miniola (Bates, 1868)
- Ancyluris rubrofilum Stichel, 1909
- Ancyluris etias (Saunders, 1859)
- Ancyluris melior Stichel, 1910
- Ancyluris paramba D'Abrera, 1994
- Ancyluris paetula Stichel, 1916
- Ancyluris tedea (Cramer, 1777)
- Ancyluris aulestes (Cramer, 1777)
- Ancyluris colubra (Saunders, 1859)
- Ancyluris mira (Hewitson, 1874)
- Ancyluris jurgensenii (Saunders, 1850)
- Ancyluris aristodorus (Morisse, 1838)
- Ancyluris formosissima (Hewitson, 1870)
- Ancyluris inca (Saunders, 1850)
- Anteros Hübner, [1819] 16 spp.
- Anteros aurigans Gallard & Brévignon, 1989
- Archaeonympha drepana (Bates, 1868)
- Archaeonympha urichi (Vane-Wright, 1994)
- Argyrogrammana amalfreda (Staudinger, [1887])
- Argyrogrammana aparamilla Hall & Willmott, 1995
- Argyrogrammana alstonii (Smart, 1979)
- Argyrogrammana barine (Staudinger, [1887])
- Argyrogrammana bonita Hall & Willmott, 1995
- Argyrogrammana caelestina Hall & Willmott, 1995
- Argyrogrammana caesarion Lathy, 1958
- Argyrogrammana celata Hall & Willmott, 1995
- Argyrogrammana chicomendesi Gallard, 1995
- Argyrogrammana crocea (Godman & Salvin, 1878)
- Argyrogrammana denisi Gallard, 1995
- Argyrogrammana glaucopis (Bates, 1868)
- Argyrogrammana johannismarci Brévignon, 1995
- Argyrogrammana leptographia (Stichel, 1911)
- Argyrogrammana natalita Hall & Willmott, 1995
- Argyrogrammana nurtia (Stichel, 1911)
- Argyrogrammana pacsa Hall & Willmott, 1998
- Argyrogrammana pastaza Hall & Willmott, 1996
- Argyrogrammana placibilis (Stichel, 1910)
- Argyrogrammana pulchra (Talbot, 1929)
- Argyrogrammana physis (Stichel, 1911)
- Argyrogrammana praestigiosa (Stichel, 1929)
- Argyrogrammana occidentalis (Godman & Salvin, [1886])
- Argyrogrammana rameli (Stichle, 1930)
- Argyrogrammana saphirina (Staudinger, [1887])
- Argyrogrammana sebastiani Brévignon, 1995
- Argyrogrammana stilbe (Godart, [1824])
- Argyrogrammana sticheli (Talbot, 1929)
- Argyrogrammana sublimis Brévignon & Gallard, 1995
- Argyrogrammana subota (Hewitson, 1877)
- Argyrogrammana talboti Brévignon & Gallard, 1998
- Argyrogrammana trochilia (Westwood, 1851)
- Argyrogrammana venilia (Bates, 1868)
- Aricoris (Fabricius, 1798) 21 spp.
- Baeotis Hübner, [1819] 20 spp.
- Baeotis attali Hall & Willmott, 1998
- Baeotis bacaenis Hewitson, 1874
- Baeotis bacaenita Schaus, 1902
- Baeotis barce Hewitson, 1875
- Baeotis capreolus Stichel, 1910
- Baeotis cephissa (Hewitson, 1875)
- Baeotis choroniensis Lichy, 1946
- Baeotis creusis Hewitson, 1874
- Baeotis elegantula Hopffer, 1874
- Baeotis euprepes (Bates, 1868)
- Baeotis felix Hewitson, 1874
- Baeotis hisbon (Cramer, [1775])
- Baeotis johannae Sharpe, 1890
- Baeotis kadenii (C. Felder & R. Felder, 1861)
- Baeotis melanis Hübner, [1831]
- Baeotis nesaea Godman & Salvin, 1889
- Baeotis prima (Bates, 1868)
- Baeotis staudingeri D'Abrera, 1994
- Baeotis sulphurea (R. Felder, 1869)
- Baeotis zonata R. Felder, 1869
- Barbicornis Godart, [1824] 1 sp.
- Brachyglenis C. Felder & R. Felder, 1862 4 spp.
- Calephelis Grote & Robinson, 1869 45 spp.
- Callistium cleadas (Hewitson, [1866])
- Callistium maculosa (Bates, 1868)
- Calospila speciose
- Calospila antonii Brévignon, 1995
- Calospila apotheta (Bates, 1868)
- Calospila emylius (Cramer, 1775)
- Calospila fannia (Godman, 1903)
- Calospila gallardi Brévignon, 1995
- Calospila gyges (Stichel, 1911)
- Calospila maeonoides (Godman, 1903)
- Calospila rhodope (Hewitson, 1853)
- Calospila satyroides (Lathy, 1932)
- Calospila thara (Hewitson, [1858])
- Calospila zeanger (Stoll, [1790])
- Calydna Doubleday, 1847 18 spp.
- Calydna cabira Hewitson, 1854
- Calydna caieta Hewitson, 1854;
- Calydna stolata Brévignon, 1998
- Calydna thersander (Stoll, [1780])
- Calydna venusta Godman & Salvin, [1886]
- Caria Hübner, [1823] 13 spp.
- Cariomothis Stichel, 1910 4 spp.
- Cartea Kirby, 1871 2 spp.
- Chalodeta Stichel, 1910 8 spp.
- Chalodeta chaonitis (Hewitson, [1866])
- Chalodeta chitinosa Hall, 2002
- Chamaelimnas C. Felder & R. Felder, [1865] 6 spp.
- Chamaelimnas briola Bates, 1868
- Charis Hübner, [1819] 2 spp.
- Chimastrum Godman & Salvin, [1886] 2 spp.
- Chorinea Gray, 1832 8 spp.
- Chorinea amazon (Saunders, 1859)
- Chorinea batesii (Saunders, 1859)
- Chorinea octauius (Fabricius, 1787)
- Colaciticus Stichel, 1910 2 spp.
- Colaciticus johnstoni (Dannatt, 1904)
- Comphotis irroratum (Godman, 1903)
- Cremna Doubleday, 1847 6 spp.
- Cremna actoris (Cramer, [1776])
- Cremna alector (Geyer, 1837)
- Crocozona C. Felder & R. Felder, [1865] 4 spp.
- Cyrenia Westwood, 1851 1 sp.
- Dachetola Hall, 2001 4 spp.
- Dachetola pione (Bates, 1868)
- Detritivora Hall & Harvey, 2002 31 spp.
- Detritivora cleonus (Stoll, [1782])
- Detritivora gallardi (Hall & Harvey, 2001)
- Dysmathia costalis Bates, 1868
- Dysmathia portia Bates, [1868]
- Echydna Hall, 2002 2 spp.
- Emesis Fabricius, 1807 43 spp.
- Emesis lucinda (Cramer, [1775])
- Esthemopsis C. Felder & R. Felder, [1865] 9 spp.
- Esthemopsis crystallina Brévignon & Gallard, 1992
- Eucorna sanarita (Schaus, 1902)
- Eunogyra Westwood, 1851 2 spp.
- Eurybia cyclopia Stichel, 1910
- Eurybia dardus (Fabricius, 1787)
- Eurybia juturna C. Felder & R. Felder, 1865
- Euselasia Hübner, [1819] 167 spp.
- Euselasia arbas (Stoll, 1781)
- Euselasia bilineata Lathy, 1926
- Euselasia cafusa (Bates, 1868)
- Euselasia cuprea Lathy, 1926
- Euselasia euboea (Hewitson, [1853])
- Euselasia euodias (Hewitson, 1856)
- Euselasia euoras (Hewitson, [1855])
- Euselasia euryone (Hewitson, 1856)
- Euselasia eustola Stichel, 1919
- Euselasia eutychus (Hewitson, 1856)
- Euselasia fayneli Gallard, mars 2006
- Euselasia gelanor (Stoll, 1780)
- Euselasia lisias (Cramer, [1777])
- Euselasia ignitus Stichel, 1924
- Euselasia inini Brévignon, 1996
- Euselasia kartopus Stichel, 1919
- Euselasia lisias (Cramer, [1777])
- Euselasia manoa Brévignon, 1996
- Euselasia midas (Fabricius, 1775)
- Euselasia opalescens (Hewitson, [1855])
- Euselasia orfita (Cramer, 1777)
- Euselasia phedica (Boisduval, [1836])
- Euselasia phelina (H. Druce, 1878)
- Euselasia praecipua Stichel, 1924
- Euselasia rubrocilia Lathy, 1926
- Euselasia saulina Brévignon, 1996
- Euselasia scotinosa Stichel, 1930
- Euselasia teleclus (Stoll, 1787)
- Euselasia urites (Hewitson, [1853])
- Euselasia uzita (Hewitson, [1853])
- Euselasia venezolana Seitz, 1913
- Euselasia violetta (Bates, 1868)
- Euselasia waponaka Brévignon,
- Euselasia zena (Hewitson, 1860)
- Exoplisia Godman & Salvin, [1886] 4 spp.
- Hades Westwood, 1851 2 spp.
- Helicopis Fabricius, 1807 3 spp.
- Helicopis cupido (Linnaeus, 1758)
- Helicopis endymiaena (Hübner, [1819])
- Hermathena candidata Hewitson, 1874
- Hyphilaria Hübner, [1819] 4 spp.
- Hyphilaria anthias (Hewitson, 1874)
- Hyphilaria nicia Hübner, [1819]
- Hyphilaria parthenis (Westwood, 1851)
- Isapis agyrtus (Cramer, [1777])
- Ithomeis Bates, 1862 2 spp.
- Ithomeis aurantiaca Bates, 1862
- Ithomiola C. Felder & R. Felder, [1865] 6 spp.
- Ithomiola floralis C. Felder & R. Felder, [1865]
- Juditha azan (Westwood, [1851])
- Juditha dorilis (Bates, 1866)
- Juditha odites (Cramer, [1775])
- Lasaia Bates, 1868 14 spp.
- Lasaia agesilas (Latreille, 1809)
- Lasaia lalannei Gallard, 2008
- Lasaia oileus Godman, 1903;
- Lemonias egaensis (Butler, 1867)
- Lemonias zygia Hübner, [1807]
- Leucochimona Stichel, 1909 9 spp.
- Leucochimona icare (Hübner, [1819])
- Leucochimona lagora (Herrich-Schäffer, [1853])
- Livendula aminias (Hewitson, 1863)
- Livendula balista (Hewitson, 1863)
- Livendula jasonhalli (Brévignon & Gallard, 1999)
- Livendula leucocyana (Geyer, 1837)
- Lucillella Strand, 1932 4 spp.
- Lyropteryx Westwood, 1851 4 spp.
- Melanis Hübner, [1819] 27 spp.
- Melanis aegates (Hewitson, 1874)
- Melanis electron (Fabricius, 1793)
- Menander coruscans (Butler, 1867)
- Menander hebrus (Cramer, [1775])
- Menander menander (Stoll, [1780])
- Menander thalassicus Brévignon & Gallard, 1992
- Mesene Doubleday, 1847 26 spp.
- Mesene bomilcar (Stoll, 1790)
- Mesene epaphus (Stoll, 1780)
- Mesene monostigma (Erichson, [1849])
- Mesene nepticula Möschler, 1877
- Mesene patawa Brévignon, 1995
- Mesene phareus (Cramer, [1777])
- Mesene silaris Godman & Salvin, 1878
- Mesenopsis Godman & Salvin, [1886] 5 spp.
- Mesophthalma Westwood, 1851 2 spp.
- Mesophthalma idotea Westwood, [1851]
- Mesosemia Hübner, [1819] 122 spp.
- Mesosemia ackeryi Brévignon, 1997
- Mesosemia antaerice Hewitson, 1859
- Mesosemia ephyne (Cramer, 1776)
- Mesosemia epidius Hewitson, 1859
- Mesosemia esmeralda Gallard & Brévignon, 1989
- Mesosemia eumene (Cramer, 1776)
- Mesosemia inconspicua Lathy, 1932
- Mesosemia melaene Hewitson, 1859
- Mesosemia menoetes Hewitson, 1859
- Mesosemia metope Hewitson, 1859
- Mesosemia minutula Gallard, 1996
- Mesosemia naiadella Stichel, 1909
- Mesosemia nympharena Stichel, 1909
- Mesosemia orbona Godman, 1903
- Mesosemia sifia (Boisduval, 1836)
- Mesosemia teulem Brévignon, 1995
- Metacharis Butler, 1867 8 spp.
- Metacharis lucius (Fabricius, 1793)
- Methone cecilia (Cramer, [1777])
- Monethe Westwood, 1851 2 spp.
- Monethe albertus C. Felder & R. Felder, 1862
- Mycastor nealces (Hewitson, 1871)
- Nahida Kirby, 1871 1 sp.
- Napaea Hübner, [1819] 18 spp.
- Napaea beltiana (Bates, 1867)
- Napaea eucharila (Bates, 1867)
- Napaea gynaecomorpha Hall, Harvey & Gallard, 2005
- Napaea nepos (Fabricius, 1793)
- Napaea orpheus (Westwood, 1851)
- Napaea sylva (Möschler, 1877)
- Necyria Westwood, 1851 3 spp.
- Nirodia Westwood, 1851 1 sp.
- Notheme erota (Cramer, [1780])
- Nymphidium speciose
- Nymphidium acherois (Boisduval, 1836)
- Nymphidium baeotia Hewitson, [1853]
- Nymphidium cachrus (Fabricius, 1787)
- Nymphidium callaghani Brévignon, 1999
- Nymphidium caricae (Linnaeus, 1758)
- Nymphidium colleti Gallard, 2008
- Nymphidium guyanensis Gallard & Brévignon, 1989
- Nymphidium hermieri Gallard, 2008
- Nymphidium lisimon (Stoll, 1790)
- Nymphidium manicorensis Callaghan, 1985
- Nymphidium mantus (Cramer, 1775)
- Nymphidium menalcus (Stoll, 1782)
- Ourocnemis Baker, 1887 2 spp.
- Pachythone Bates, 1868 speciose
- Pachythone lateritia Bates, 1868
- Panara Doubleday, 1847 5 spp.
- Panara phereclus (Linnaeus, 1758)
- Panaropsis Hall, 2002 4 spp.
- Panaropsis semiota (Bates, 1868)
- Panaropsis thyatira (Hewitson, [1853])
- Pandemos pasiphae (Cramer, [1775])
- Paraphthonia Stichel, 1910 2 spp.
- Parcella Stichel, 1910 1 sp.
- Perophthalma Westwood, 1851 3 spp.
- Perophthalma tullius (Fabricius, 1787)
- Phaenochitonia Stichel, 1910 7 spp.
- Phaenochitonia cingulus (Stoll, 1790)
- Pheles Herrich-Schäffer, [1858] 8 spp.
- Pheles atricolor (Butler, 1871)
- Pheles heliconides Herrich-Schäffer, [1858]
- Pirascca Hall & Willmott, 1996 12 spp.
- Pirascca arbuscula (Möschler, 1883)
- Pirascca interrupta (Lathy, 1932)
- Pirascca sticheli (Lathy, 1932)
- Pirascca tyriotes (Godman & Salvin, 1878)
- Pseudotinea Hall & Callaghan, 2003 5 spp.
- Pterographium Stichel, 1910 1 sp.
- Rhetus Swainson, [1829] 3 spp.
- Riodina Westwood, 1851 3 spp.
- Riodina lysippus (Linnaeus, 1758)
- Rodinia calphurnia (Saunders, 1850)
- Roeberella flocculus Brévignon & Gallard, 1993
- Sarota Westwood, [1851] 20 spp.
- Sarota acanthoides (Herrich-Schäffer, [1853])
- Sarota chrysus (Stoll, [1782])
- Sarota gamelia Godman & Salvin, [1886]
- Sarota miranda Brévignon, 1998
- Seco Hall & Harvey, 2002 3 spp.
- Setabis epitus (Cramer, [1780])
- Setabis lagus (Cramer, [1777])
- Semomesia Westwood, 1851 8 spp.
- Semomesia alyattes Zikán, 1952
- Semomesia capanea (Cramer, 1779)
- Semomesia cecilae Gallard, 1997
- Semomesia nesti (Hewitson, 1858)
- Siseme Westwood, [1851] 9 spp.
- Stalachtis calliope (Linnaeus, 1758)
- Stalachtis euterpe (Linnaeus, 1758)
- Stalachtis phaedusa (Hübner, [1813])
- Stichelia Zikán, 1949 4 spp.
- Styx infernalis Staudinger, 1875
- Symmachia Hübner, [1819] 51 spp.
- Symmachia accusatrix Westwood, 1851
- Symmachia basilissa (Bates, 1868)
- Symmachia calligrapha Hewitson, 1867
- Symmachia calliste Hewitson, 1867
- Symmachia emeralda Hall & Harvey, 2002
- Symmachia estellina Gallard, 2008
- Symmachia falcistriga Stichel, 1910
- Symmachia hippea Herrich-Schäffer, [1853]
- Symmachia juratrix Westwood, 1851
- Symmachia leena Hewitson, 1870
- Symmachia leopardinum (C. Felder & R. Felder, [1865])
- Symmachia multesima Stichel, 1910
- Symmachia miron Grose-Smith, 1898
- Symmachia norina Hewitson, 1867
- Symmachia pardalis Hewitson, 1867
- Symmachia poirieri Gallard, 2009
- Symmachia probetor (Stoll, [1782])
- Symmachia rosanti Gallard, déc. 2008
- Symmachia stigmosissima Stichel, 1910
- Symmachia technema Stichel, 1910
- Symmachia threissa Hewitson, 1870
- Symmachia triangularis (Thieme, 1907)
- Symmachia tricolor Hewitson, 1867
- Symmachia tigrina Hewitson, 1867
- Symmachia virgatula Stichel, 1910
- Synargis abaris (Cramer, 1776)
- Synargis agle (Hewitson, [1853])
- Synargis calyce (C. Felder & R. Felder, 1862)
- Synargis chaonia (Hewitson, [1853])
- Synargis fenestrella (Lathy, 1932)
- Synargis galena (Bates, 1868)
- Synargis orestessa Hübner, [1819]
- Synargis phliasus (Clerck, 1764)
- Synargis tytia (Cramer, [1777])
- Syrmatia Hübner, [1819] 4 spp.
- Teratophthalma Stichel, 1909 5 spp.
- Themone Westwood, 1851 3 spp.
- Themone pais ( Hübner, [1820])
- Theope amicitiae Hall, Gallard & Brévignon, 1998
- Theope archimedes (Fabricius, 1793)
- Theope aureonitens Bates, 1868
- Theope barea Godman & Salvin, 1878
- Theope batesi Hall, 1998
- Theope brevignoni Gallard, 1996
- Theope caroli Brevignon, 2011
- Theope christiani Hall & Willmott, 1999
- Theope christophi rorota Brevignon, 2011
- Theope discus Bates, 1868
- Theope ebera Brevignon, 2011
- Theope ernestinae Brevignon, 2011
- Theope eudocia Westwood, 1851
- Theope eurygonina Bates, 1868
- Theope excelsa Bates, 1868
- Theope fayneli Gallard, 2002
- Theope fernandezi Brevignon, 2011
- Theope foliolum Brevignon, 2011
- Theope foliorum Bates, 1868
- Theope fracisi Brevignon, 2010
- Theope galionicus Gallard & Brévignon, 1989
- Theope guillaumei Gallard, 1996
- Theope janus Bates, 1867
- Theope johannispetreus Brevignon, 2010
- Theope lampropteryx Bates, 1868
- Theope leucanthe Bates, 1868
- Theope lichyi Brevignon, 2011
- Theope lycaenina Bates, 1868
- Theope martinae Brevignon, 2011
- Theope minialba Gallard, 2006
- Theope mundula Stichel, 1926
- Theope nobilis Bates, 1868
- Theope nycteis (Westwood, 1851)
- Theope orphana (Stichel, 1911)
- Theope palambala Gallard, 2009
- Theope pedias Herrich-Schäffer, [1853]
- Theope phaeo Prittwiz, 1865
- Theope philotes (Westwood, 1851)
- Theope pieridoides C. Felder & R. Felder, 1865
- Theope rochambellus Brevignon, 2010
- Theope saphir Brevignon, 2009
- Theope sericea Bates, 1868
- Theope sobrina Bates, 1868
- Theope sticheli Hall, 1998
- Theope terambus (Godart, [1824])
- Theope tetrastigmoides Hall, 2008
- Theope thootes Hewitson, 1860
- Theope virgilius (Fabricius, 1793)
- Theope wallacei Hall, 1998
- Theope zafaran Brevignon, 2011
- Thisbe molela (Hewitson, 1865)
- Voltinia Stichel, 1910 2 spp.
- Xenandra C. Felder & R. Felder, [1865] 9 spp.
- Xenandra helius (Cramer, 1779)
- Xynias Hewitson, 1874 2 spp.
- Xynias lithosina (Bates, 1868)
- Zelotaea alba Gallard & Brévignon, 1989
- Zelotaea suffusca Brévignon & Gallard, 1993

== Pieridae ==
=== Coliadinae ===
- Anteos menippe (Hübner, [1818])
- Aphrissa fluminensis (d'Almeida, 1921)
- Aphrissa boisduvalii (C. Felder & R. Felder, 1861)
- Aphrissa statira (Cramer, [1777])
- Aphrissa wallacei (C. Felder & R. Felder, 1862)
- Eurema agave (Cramer, [1775])
- Eurema albula (Cramer, [1776])
- Eurema arbela Geyer, 1832
- Eurema daira (Godart, 1819)
- Eurema deva (Doubleday, 1847)
- Eurema elathea (Cramer, [1777])
- Eurema fabiola (C. Felder & R. Felder, 1861)
- Eurema lirina (Bates, 1861)
- Eurema lucina (Poey, [1852])
- Eurema mexicana (Boisduval, 1836)
- Eurema nigrocincta Dognin, 1889
- Eurema paulina (Bates, 1861)
- Eurema phiale (Cramer, [1775])
- Eurema reticulata (Butler, 1871)
- Eurema salome (C. Felder & R. Felder, 1861)
- Eurema tupuntenem Lichy, 1976
- Eurema xantochlora (Kollar, 1850)
- Eurema leuce (Boisduval, 1836)
- Eurema nise (Cramer, [1775])
- Eurema proterpia (Fabricius, 1775)
- Eurema venusta (Boisduval, 1836)
- Eurema zelia (Lucas, 1852)
- Kricogonia cabrerai Ramsden, 1920
- Kricogonia lyside (Godart, 1819)
- Leucidia brephos (Hübner, [1809])
- Leucidia elvina (Godart, 1819)
- Nathalis plauta Doubleday, 1847
- Phoebis neocypris (Hübner, [1823])
- Phoebis philea (Linnaeus, 1763)
- Phoebis sennae (Linnaeus, 1758)
- Phoebis agarithe (Boisduval, [1836])
- Phoebis argante (Fabricius, 1775)
- Phoebis bourkei (Dixey, 1933)

=== Dismorphiinae ===
- Dismorphia altis Fassl, 1910
- Dismorphia amphione (Cramer, 1779)
- Dismorphia arcadia (C. Felder & R. Felder, 1862)
- Dismorphia astyocha Hübner, [1831]
- Dismorphia boliviana Forster, 1955
- Dismorphia crisia (Drury, 1782)
- Dismorphia hyposticta (C. Felder & R. Felder, 1861)
- Dismorphia laja (Cramer, 1779)
- Dismorphia lelex (Hewitson, 1869)
- Dismorphia lewyi (Lucas, 1852)
- Dismorphia lua (Hewitson, 1869)
- Dismorphia lycosura (Hewitson, [1860])
- Dismorphia lygdamis (Hewitson, 1869)
- Dismorphia lysis (Hewitson, 1869)
- Dismorphia medora (Doubleday, 1844)
- Dismorphia medorilla (Hewitson, 1877)
- Dismorphia melia (Godart, [1824])
- Dismorphia mirandola (Hewitson, 1878)
- Dismorphia niepelti Weymer, 1909
- Dismorphia pseudolewyi Forster, 1955
- Dismorphia teresa (Hewitson, 1869)
- Dismorphia thermesia (Godart, 1819)
- Dismorphia thermesina (Hopffer, 1874)
- Dismorphia theucharila (Doubleday, 1848)
- Dismorphia zaela (Hewitson, [1858])
- Dismorphia zathoe (Hewitson, [1858])
- Enantia albania (H. W. Bates, 1864)
- Enantia aloikea Brévignon, 1993
- Enantia citrinella (C. Felder & R. Felder, 1861)
- Enantia clarissa (Weymer, 1895)
- Enantia jethys (Boisduval, 1836)
- Enantia limnorina (C. Felder & R. Felder, 1865)
- Enantia lina (Herbst, 1792)
- Enantia mazai Llorente, 1984
- Enantia melite (Linnaeus, 1763)
- Lieinix christa (Reissinger, 1970)
- Lieinix nemesis (Latreille, [1813])
- Moschoneura pinthous (Linnaeus, 1758)
- Patia orise (Boisduval, [1836])
- Patia cordillera (C. Felder & R. Felder, 1862)
- Patia rhetes (Hewitson, [1857])
- Pseudopieris nehemia (Boisduval, 1836)
- Pseudopieris viridula (C. Felder & R. Felder, 1861)

=== Pierinae ===
- Appias drusilla (Cramer, [1777])
- Archonias brassolis (Fabricius, 1777)
- Ascia monuste (Linnaeus, 1764)
- Catasticta Butler, 1870 96 spp.
- Charonias eurytele (Hewitson, 1853)
- Charonias theano (Boisduval, 1836)
- Eroessa chiliensis (Guérin-Méneville, 1830)
- Ganyra phaloe (Godart, 1819)
- Glennia pylotis (Godart, 1819)
- Hesperocharis hirlanda (Stoll, [1790])
- Hesperocharis nera (Hewitson, 1852)
- Hypsochila argyrodice (Staudinger, 1899)
- Hypsochila galactodice Ureta, 1955
- Hypsochila huemul Peña, 1964
- Hypsochila microdice (Blanchard, 1852)
- Hypsochila penai Ureta, 1955
- Hypsochila wagenknechti (Ureta, 1938)
- Infraphulia illimani (Weymer, 1890)
- Infraphulia ilyodes (Ureta, 1955)
- Infraphulia madeleinea Field & Herrera, 1977
- Itaballia demophile (Linnaeus, 1763)
- Itaballia marana (Doubleday, 1844)
- Itaballia pandosia (Hewitson, 1853)
- Leodonta dysoni (Doubleday, 1847)
- Leodonta tagaste (C. Felder & R. Felder, 1859)
- Leodonta tellane (Hewitson, 1860)
- Leodonta zenobia (C. Felder & R. Felder, 1865)
- Leodonta zenobina (Hopffer, 1869)
- Leptophobia Butler, 1870 17 spp.
- Mathania agasicles (Hewitson, 1874)
- Mathania aureomaculata (Dognin, 1888)
- Mathania carrizoi Giacomelli, 1914
- Mathania leucothea (Molina, 1782)
- Melete calymnia (C. Felder & R. Felder, 1862)
- Melete leucadia (C. Felder & R. Felder, 1862)
- Melete leucanthe (C. Felder & R. Felder, 1861)
- Melete lycimnia (Cramer, 1777)
- Melete polyhymnia (C. Felder & R. Felder, 1865)
- Melete salacia (Godart, 1819)
- Pereute antodyca (Boisduval, 1836)
- Pereute callinice (C. Felder & R. Felder, 1861)
- Pereute callinira Staudinger, 1884
- Pereute charops (Boisduval, 1836)
- Pereute cheops Staudinger, 1884
- Pereute leucodrosime (Kollar, 1850)
- Pereute lindemannae Reissinger, 1970
- Pereute swainsoni (Gray, 1832)
- Pereute telthusa (Hewitson, 1860)
- Perrhybris lorena (Hewitson, 1852)
- Perrhybris lypera (Kollar, 1850)
- Perrhybris pamela (Stoll, 1780)
- Phulia garleppi Field & Herrera, 1977
- Phulia nannophyes Dyar, 1913
- Phulia nymphula (Blanchard, 1852)
- Phulia paranympha Staudinger, 1894
- Piercolias coropunae (Dyar, 1913)
- Piercolias forsteri Field & Herrera, 1977
- Piercolias huanaco (Staudinger, 1894)
- Pieriballia viardi (Boisduval, 1836)
- Pierphulia isabela Field & Herrera, 1977
- Pierphulia nysiella (Röber, [1909])
- Pierphulia rosea (Ureta, 1956)
- Reliquia santamarta Ackery, 1975
- Tatochila Butler, 1870
- Theochila maenacte (Boisduval, 1836)

== Lycaenidae ==
=== Polyommatinae ===
- Leptotes cassius (Cramer, [1775])
- Leptotes marina (Reakirt, 1868)

=== Theclinae ===
- Allosmaitia Clench, 1964 5 spp. 2 Central America
- Apuecla picus (H. H. Druce, 1907)
- Arawacus Kaye, 1904 17 spp. some Central America
- Arawacus aetolus Sultzer, 1776
- Arawacus sito (Boisduval, 1836)
- Arcas Swainson, 1832 9 spp.
- Arcas imperialis (Cramer, [1775])
- Atlides Hübner, [1819] 17 spp.
- Atlides inachus (Cramer, [1775])
- Arumecla Robbins & Duarte, 2004 3 spp.
- Arumecla aruma (Hewitson, 1877)
- Aubergina vanessoides (Prittwitz, 1865)
- Aubergina alda (Hewitson, 1868)
- Balintus tityrus (C. Felder & R. Felder, 1865)
- Bistonina Robbins, 2004 6 spp. some Central America
- Bistonina erema (Hewitson, 1867)
- Brangas Hübner, [1819] 11 spp.
- Brangas getus (Fabricius, 1787)
- Brevianta Johnson, Kruse & Kroenlein, 1997 8 spp.
- Busbiina Robbins, 2004 1 sp.
- Calycopis Scudder, 1876 64 spp.
- Calycopis cerata (Hewitson, 1877)
- Calycopis caesaries (H. H. Druce, 1907)
- Calycopis calus (Godart, [1824])
- Calycopis matho (Godman & Salvin, [1887])
- Calycopis puppius (Godman & Salvin, [1887])
- Calycopis xeneta (Hewitson, 1877)
- Camissecla Robbins & Duarte, 2004 12 spp.
- Celmia anastomosis (Draudt, [1918])
- Celmia celmus (Cramer, [1775])
- Celmia uzza (Hewitson, 1873)
- Celmia color (H. H. Druce, 1907)
- Celmia mecrida (Hewitson, 1867)
- Celmia anastomosis (Draudt, [1918])
- Celmia conoveria (Schaus, 1902)
- Chalybs janias (Cramer, [1779])
- Chalybs chloris (Hewitson, 1877)
- Chalybs hassan (Stoll, [1790])
- Chalybs lineata (Lathy, 1936)
- Chlorostrymon Clench, 1961 6 spp. some Central America
- Chlorostrymon simaethis (Drury, [1773])
- Contrafacia Johnson, 1989 6 spp.
- Contrafacia imma (Prittwitz, 1865)
- Dicya dicaea (Hewitson, 1874)
- Dicya carnica (Hewitson, 1873)
- Dicya iambe (Godman & Salvin, [1887])
- Dicya eumorpha (Hayward, 1949)
- Electrostrymon Clench, 1961 10 spp. several Central America
- Enos Johnson, Kruse & Kroenlein, 1997 5 spp.
- Enos falerina (Hewitson, 1867)
- Eumaeus Hübner, [1819] 3 spp.
- Erora biblia (Hewitson, 1868)
- Erora tella (Schaus, 1902)
- Erora phrosine (H. H. Druce, 1909)
- Erora carla (Schaus, 1902)
- Erora gabina (Godman & Salvin, [1887])
- Erora opisena (H. Druce, 1912)
- Erora campa (E. D. Jones, 1912)
- Erora badeta (Hewitson, 1873)
- Erora senta (Draudt, 1920)
- Erora caespes (H. H. Druce, 1907)
- Erora melba (Hewitson, 1877)
- Erora nana (C. Felder & R. Felder, 1865)
- Erora lorina (Hewitson, 1874)
- Evenus Hübner, [1819] 12 spp.
- Evenus batesi (Hewitson, 1865)
- Evenus floralia (H. H. Druce, 1907)
- Evenus gabriela (Cramer, 1775)
- Evenus sponsa (Möschler, 1877)
- Exorbaetta metanira (Hewitson, 1867)
- Gargina gargophia (Hewitson, 1877)
- Gargina thyesta (Hewitson, 1869)
- Gargina caninius (H. H. Druce, 1907)
- Gargina gnosia (Hewitson, 1868)
- Gargina emessa (Hewitson, 1867)
- Gargina humber (Schaus, 1902)
- Gargina thoria (Hewitson, 1869)
- Gargina panchaea (Hewitson, 1869)
- Hypostrymon renidens (Draudt, 1920)
- Hypostrymon aepeona (Draudt, 1920)
- Iaspis verania (Hewitson, 1868)
- Iaspis ornata Austin & Johnson, 1996
- Iaspis castitas (H. H. Druce, 1907)
- Iaspis exiguus (H. H. Druce, 1907)
- Iaspis talayra (Hewitson, 1868)
- Iaspis castimonia (H. H. Druce, 1907)
- Iaspis thabena (Hewitson, 1868)
- Iaspis beera (Hewitson, 1870)
- Iaspis grandis Austin & Johnson, 1996
- Iaspis temesa (Hewitson, 1868)
- Ignata mulsus (H. H. Druce, 1907)
- Ignata elana (Hewitson, 1874)
- Ignata brasiliensis (Talbot, 1928)
- Ignata norax (Godman & Salvin, [1887])
- Ignata levis (H. H. Druce, 1907)
- Ipidecla Dyar, 1916 3 spp.
- Janthecla Robbins & Venables, 1991 10 spp. some Central America, coastal Brazil
- Janthecla leea Venables & Robbins, 1991
- Janthecla malvina (Hewitson, 1867)
- Janthecla sista (Hewitson, 1867)
- Johnsonita Salazar & Constantino, 1995 7 spp.
- Kolana Robbins, 2004 5 spp.
- Kolana ergina (Hewitson, 1867)
- Kolana ligurina (Hewitson, 1874)
- Lamasina Robbins, 2002 4 spp.
- Lamprospilus Geyer, [1832] 26 spp. few Central America, Argentine
- Lamprospilus badaca (Hewitson, 1868)
- Lamprospilus quadramacula (Austin & Johnson, 1997)
- Laothus Johnson, Kruse & Kroenlein, 1997 8 spp. few Central America
- Laothus numen (H. H. Druce, 1907)
- Lathecla latagus (Godman & Salvin, [1887])
- Magnastigma Nicolay, 1977 3 spp.
- Marachina maraches (H. Druce, 1912)
- Marachina fidelia (Hewitson, 1874)
- Marachina peonida (Draudt, 1919)
- Megathecla Robbins, 2002 2 spp.
- Micandra Schatz, 1888 9 spp.
- Michaelus phoenissa (Hewitson, 1867)
- Michaelus jebus (Godart, [1824])
- Michaelus thordesa (Hewitson, 1867)
- Michaelus ira (Hewitson, 1867)
- Ministrymon albimimicus (Johnson, 1986)
- Ministrymon megacles (Stoll, [1780])
- Ministrymon arola (Hewitson, 1868)
- Ministrymon coronta (Hewitson, 1874)
- Ministrymon zilda (Hewitson, 1873)
- Ministrymon ollantaitamba (Johnson, Miller & Herrera, 1992)
- Ministrymon sanguinalis (Burmeister, 1878)
- Ministrymon gamma (H. H. Druce, 1909)
- Ministrymon cruenta (Gosse, 1880)
- Ministrymon arthuri Bálint, Johnson & Austin, [1999]
- Ministrymon azia (Hewitson, 1873)
- Ministrymon cleon (Fabricius, 1775)
- Ministrymon fostera (Schaus, 1902)
- Ministrymon una (Hewitson, 1873)
- Mithras Hübner, [1819] 9 spp.
- Nesiostrymon calchinia (Hewitson, 1868)
- Nesiostrymon hyccara (Hewitson, 1868)
- Nesiostrymon celona (Hewitson, 1874)
- Nesiostrymon endela (Hewitson, 1874)
- Nesiostrymon tristis (Lathy, 1926)
- Nicolaea Johnson, 1993 26 spp.
- Nicolaea besidia (Hewitson, 1868)
- Nicolaea fabulla (Hewitson, 1868)
- Ocaria Clench, 1970 13 spp. some Central America
- Oenomaus speciose (30+ species in 8 species groups)
- Oenomaus isabellae Faynel, 2006
- Olynthus narbal (Stoll, [1790])
- Olynthus ophelia (Hewitson, 1867)
- Olynthus avoca (Hewitson, 1867)
- Olynthus obsoleta (Lathy, 1926)
- Olynthus fulvoventris Austin & Johnson, 1998
- Olynthus nitor (H. H. Druce, 1907)
- Olynthus negrus Austin & Johnson, 1998
- Olynthus fancia (E. D. Jones, 1912)
- Olynthus hypsea (Godman & Salvin, [1887])
- Olynthus punctum (Herrich-Schäffer, [1853])
- Olynthus essus (Herrich-Schäffer, [1853])
- Olynthus lorea (Möschler, 1883)
- Olynthus ostia (Hewitson, 1867)
- Olynthus porphyreticus (H. H. Druce, 1907)
- Ostrinotes purpuriticus (H. H. Druce, 1907)
- Ostrinotes empusa (Hewitson, 1867)
- Ostrinotes halciones (Butler & H. Druce, 1872)
- Ostrinotes tympania (Hewitson, 1869)
- Ostrinotes tarena (Hewitson, 1874)
- Ostrinotes gentiana (H. H. Druce, 1907)
- Ostrinotes sospes (Draudt, 1920)
- Ostrinotes keila (Hewitson, 1869)
- Ostrinotes sophocles (Fabricius, 1793)
- Paiwarria Kaye, 1904 5 spp.
- Paiwarria telemus (Cramer, [1775])
- Panthiades bitias (Cramer, [1777])
- Panthiades hebraeus (Hewitson, 1867)
- Panthiades aeolus (Fabricius, 1775)
- Panthiades boreas (C. Felder & R. Felder, 1865)
- Panthiades paphlagon (C. Felder & R. Felder, 1865)
- Panthiades bathildis (C. Felder & R. Felder, 1865)
- Panthiades phaleros (Linnaeus, 1767)
- Parrhasius m-album (Boisduval & Le Conte, 1833)
- Parrhasius orgia (Hewitson, 1867)
- Penaincisalia Johnson, 1990 33 spp.
- Phothecla Robbins, 2004 2 spp.
- Podanotum Torres, Hall, Willmott & Johnson, 1996 8 spp.
- Porthecla annette Faynel & R. K. Robbins, 2011
- Porthecla barba (H. H. Druce, 1907)
- Porthecla dinus (Hewitson, 1867)
- Porthecla forasteira Faynel & A. Moser, 2011
- Porthecla gemma (H. H. Druce, 1907)
- Porthecla johanna Faynel & R. K. Robbins, 2011
- Porthecla minyia (Hewitson, 1867)
- Porthecla peruensis Faynel & A. Moser, 2011
- Porthecla porthura (H. H. Druce, 1907)
- Porthecla prietoi Faynel & Busby, 2011
- Porthecla ravus (H. H. Druce, 1907)
- Porthecla willmotti Busby, Faynel & A. Moser, 2011
- Pseudolycaena Wallengren, 1858 2 spp. Andes
- Rekoa Kaye, 1904 7 spp.
- Rhamma Johnson, 1992 28 spp. Andes
- Salazaria D'Abrera & Bálint, 2001 2 spp. Andes
- Semonina ares (Godman & Salvin, [1887])
- Siderus (8 species)
- Siderus leucophaeus (Hübner, 1818)
- Siderus eliatha (Hewitson, 1867)
- Siderus athymbra (Hewitson, 1867)
- Siderus philinna (Hewitson, 1868)
- Siderus giapor (Schaus, 1902)
- Strephonota acameda (Hewitson, 1867)
- Strephonota adela (Staudinger, 1888)
- Strephonota ambrax (Westwood, 1852)
- Strephonota bicolorata Faynel, 2003;
- Strephonota carteia (Hewitson, 1867)
- Strephonota cyllarissus (Herbst, 1800)
- Strephonota malvania (Hewitson, 1867)
- Strephonota parvipuncta (Lathy, 1926)
- Strephonota porphyritis (H. H. Druce, 1907)
- Strephonota sphinx (Fabricius, 1775)
- Strephonota strephon (Fabricius, 1775)
- Strephonota syedra (Hewitson, 1867)
- Strephonota tephraeus (Geyer, 1837)
- Strephonota tyriam (H. H. Druce, 1907)
- Strymon Hübner, 1818 53 spp. some Nearctic, some Central America
- Strymon megarus (Godart, [1824])
- Symbiopsis tanais (Godman & Salvin, [1887])
- Symbiopsis pencilatus Johnson & Le Crom, 1997
- Symbiopsis perulera Robbins, 2004
- Symbiopsis aprica (Möschler, 1883)
- Symbiopsis morpho Nicolay, 1971
- Symbiopsis rickmani (Schaus, 1902)
- Symbiopsis pupilla (Draudt, 1920)
- Symbiopsis pentas Nicolay, 1971
- Symbiopsis strenua (Hewitson, 1877)
- Symbiopsis lenitas (H. H. Druce, 1907)
- Symbiopsis nivepunctata (H. H. Druce, 1907)
- Temecla Robbins, 2004 6 spp.
- Terenthina terentia (Hewitson, 1868)
- Terenthina bradyae (D'Abrera, 1995)
- Timaeta Johnson, Kruse & Kroenlein, 1997 7 spp. Andes
- Thaeides Johnson, Kruse & Kroenlein, 1997 5 spp.
- Theclopsis lydus (Hübner, [1819])
- Theclopsis murex (H. H. Druce, 1907)
- Theclopsis epidius (Godman & Salvin, [1887])
- Theclopsis gargara (Hewitson, 1868)
- Theclopsis mycon (Godman & Salvin, [1887])
- Theclopsis aurina Robbins, 2002
- Theorema Hewitson, 1865 3 spp.
- Thepytus thyrea (Hewitson, 1867)
- Thepytus arindela (Hewitson, 1874)
- Thepytus echelta (Hewitson, 1867)
- Thereus cithonius (Godart, [1824])
- Thereus Hübner, [1819] 23 spp.
- Thereus pedusa (Hewitson, 1867)
- Thereus tiasa (Hewitson, 1869)
- Theritas Hübner, 1818 25 spp.
- Theritas hemon (Cramer, [1775])
- Theritas triquetra (Hewitson, 1865)
- Theritas viresco (H. H. Druce, 1907)
- Thestius Hübner, [1819] 6 spp.
- Thestius pholeus (Cramer, [1777])
- Tmolus Hübner, [1819] 6 spp. few Central America
- Tmolus venustus (H. H. Druce, 1907)
- Trichonis hyacinthus (Cramer, [1775])
- Trichonis immaculata Lathy, 1930
- Ziegleria hesperitis (Butler & H. Druce, 1872)
- Ziegleria ceromia (Hewitson, 1877)
- Ziegleria syllis (Godman & Salvin, [1887])
- Ziegleria perisus (H. H. Druce, 1907)

== Nymphalidae ==
=== Apaturinae ===
- Doxocopa Hübner, [1819] 15 spp.
- Doxocopa agathina (Cramer, [1777])

=== Biblidinae ===
- Antigonis pharsalia (Hewitson, [1852])
- Asterope Hübner, [1819] 7 spp.
- Asterope markii (Hewitson, 1857)
- Batesia hypochlora C. Felder & R. Felder, 1862
- Biblis hyperia (Cramer, [1779])
- Callicore endemic, speciose ( 20 spp.)
- Callicore astarte (Cramer, 1779)
- Callicore maronensis (Oberthür, 1916)
- Callicore pygas (Godart, [1824])
- Callicore texa (Hewitson, [1855])
- Catacore kolyma (Hewitson, 1851)
- Catonephele Hübner, [1819] 11 spp.
- Catonephele acontius (Linnaeus, 1771)
- Catonephele antinoe (Godart, [1824])
- Catonephele numilia (Cramer, 1776)
- Cybdelis Boisduval, [1836] 3 spp.
- Diaethria Billberg, 1820 12 spp. some Central America
- Diaethria clymena (Cramer, [1775])
- Dynamine Hübner, [1819] 39 spp.
- Dynamine athemon (Linnaeus, 1758)
- Dynamine laugieri (Oberthür, 1916)
- Dynamine pebana Staudinger, [1885]
- Ectima Doubleday, [1848] 4 spp.
- Epiphile Doubleday, 1844 15 spp. some Central America
- Eunica Hübner, [1819] 40 spp.
- Eunica alpais (Godart, [1824])
- Eunica amelia (Cramer, 1777)
- Eunica anna (Cramer, 1780).
- Eunica eurota (Cramer, [1775])
- Eunica orphise (Cramer, [1775])
- Eunica sophonisba (Cramer, 1780)
- Eunica volumna Godart, 1824.
- Haematera pyrame (Hübner, [1819])
- Hamadryas Hübner, 1806 20 spp.
- Hamadryas amphinome (Linnaeus, 1767)
- Hamadryas arinome (Lucas, 1853)
- Hamadryas feronia (Linnaeus, 1758)
- Mesotaenia vaninka (Hewitson, 1855)
- Mestra dorcas (Fabricius, 1775)
- Myscelia Doubleday, 1844 9 spp. some Central America
- Myscelia milloi Oberthür, 1916
- Nessaea Hübner, [1819] 4 spp.
- Nessaea batesii (C. Felder & R. Felder, 1860)
- Nica flavilla (Godart, [1824])
- Orophila Staudinger, [1886] 2 spp.
- Panacea Godman & Salvin, [1883] 6 spp.
- Panacea bleuzeni Plantrou & Attal, 1986
- Paulogramma pyracmon (Godart, [1824])
- Peria lamis (Cramer, [1779])
- Perisama Doubleday, [1849] 42 spp.
- Pyrrhogyra Hübner, [1819] 6 spp.
- Pyrrhogyra amphiro Bates, 1865
- Pyrrhogyra edocla (Doubleday, 1848)
- Pyrrhogyra neaerea (Linnaeus, 1758)
- Pyrrhogyra otolais Bates, 1864;
- Pyrrhogyra stratonicus Fruhstorfer, 1908
- Sea sophronia (Godart, [1824])
- Temenis Hübner, [1819] 3 spp.
- Temenis laothoe (Cramer, [1777])
- Vila emilia (Cramer, [1779])

=== Charaxinae ===
- Agrias aedon Hewitson, [1848]
- Agrias amydon Hewitson, 1854
- Agrias claudina (Godart, [1824])
- Agrias hewitsonius Bates, 1860
- Agrias narcissus Staudinger, [1885]
- Anaeomorpha splendida Rothschild, 1894
- Archaeoprepona Fruhstorfer, 1915 8 spp.
- Archaeoprepona amphimachus (Fabricius, 1775)
- Archaeoprepona demophon (Linnaeus, 1758)
- Coenophlebia archidona (Hewitson, 1860)
- Consul fabius (Cramer, [1775])
- Consul panariste (Hewitson, 1856)
- Fountainea ryphea (Cramer, [1775])
- Hypna clytemnestra (Cramer, 1777).
- Memphis speciose
- Memphis acidalia (Hübner, [1819])
- Memphis basilia (Stoll, [1780])
- Memphis glauce (C. Felder & R. Felder, 1862)
- Memphis grandis (H. Druce, 1877)
- Memphis laertes (Cramer, [1775])
- Memphis leonida (Stoll, [1782])
- Memphis moruus (Fabricius, 1775)
- Memphis oenomais (Boisduval, 1870)
- Memphis phantes (Hopffer, 1874)
- Memphis philumena (Doubleday, [1849])
- Memphis pithyusa (R. Felder, 1869)
- Memphis polycarmes (Fabricius, 1775)
- Memphis xenocles (Westwood, 1850)
- Noreppa chromus (Guérin-Méneville, 1844)
- Polygrapha Staudinger, [1887] 4 spp.
- Polygrapha xenocrates (Westwood, 1850)
- Prepona Boisduval, [1836] 7 spp.
- Prepona dexamenus Hopffer, 1874
- Prepona eugenes Bates, 1865
- Prepona gnorima Bates, 1865
- Prepona laertes (Hübner, [1811])
- Prepona lygia Fruhstorfer, 1904
- Prepona neoterpe Honrath, 1844
- Prepona pheridamas (Cramer, [1777])
- Prepona philipponi Le Moult, 1932
- Prepona pseudomphale Le Moult, 1932
- Prepona pylene Hewitson, 1853
- Prepona werneri Hering, 1925
- Siderone galanthis (Cramer, [1775])
- Siderone syntyche Hewitson, 1854
- Zaretis isidora (Cramer, [1779])
- Zaretis itys (Cramer, 1777)
- Zaretis syene (Hewitson, 1856)

=== Cyrestinae ===
- Marpesia Hübner, 1818 17 spp. few Central America
- Marpesia orsilochus (Fabricius, 1776)

=== Danainae ===
- Aeria eurimedia (Cramer, [1777])
- Aeria elara (Hewitson, 1855)
- Aeria olena Weymer, 1875
- Aremfoxia ferra (Haensch, 1909)
- Athesis clearista Doubleday, 1847
- Athesis acrisione Hewitson, 1869
- Athesis vitrala Kaye, 1918
- Athyrtis mechanitis C. Felder & R. Felder, 1862
- Brevioleria Lamas, 2004 4 spp.
- Callithomia Bates, 1862 3 spp.
- Callithomia alexirrhoe Bates, 1862
- Callithomia hezia (Hewitson, [1854])
- Callithomia lenea (Cramer, [1779])
- Ceratinia Hübner, 1816 4 spp.
- Ceratinia cayana (Salvin, 1869)
- Ceratinia neso (Hübner, [1806])
- Danaus eresimus (Cramer, [1777])
- Danaus gilippus (Cramer, [1775])
- Danaus plexippus (Linnaeus, 1758)
- Dircenna Doubleday, [1847] 6 spp.
- Dircenna adina (Hewitson, [1855])
- Dircenna dero (Hübner, 1823)
- Dircenna jemina (Geyer, [1837])
- Dircenna loreta Haensch, 1903
- Dircenna olyras (C. Felder & R. Felder, [1865])
- Elzunia humboldt (Latreille, [1809])
- Elzunia pavonii (Butler, 1873)
- Episcada Godman & Salvin, [1879] 15 spp.
- Episcada apuleia (Hewitson, 1868)
- Episcada canilla (Hewitson, 1874)
- Episcada carcinia Schaus, 1902
- Episcada clausina (Hewitson, 1876)
- Episcada doto (Hübner, [1806])
- Episcada hemixanthe (C. Felder & R. Felder, 1865)
- Episcada hymen Haensch, 1905
- Episcada hymenaea (Prittwitz, 1865)
- Episcada mira (Hewitson, 1877)
- Episcada philoclea (Hewitson, [1855])
- Episcada polita Weymer, 1899
- Episcada sulphurea Haensch, 1905
- Episcada sylpha Haensch, 1905
- Episcada ticidella (Hewitson, 1869)
- Episcada vitrea d'Almeida & Mielke, 1967
- Epityches eupompe (Geyer, 1832)
- Eutresis hypereia Doubleday, 1847
- Forbestra equicola (Cramer, [1780])
- Forbestra olivencia (Bates, 1862)
- Forbestra proceris (Weymer, 1883)
- Godyris Boisduval, 1870 13 spp.
- Godyris cleomella (Hewitson, 1874)
- Godyris crinippa (Hewitson, 1874)
- Godyris dircenna (C. Felder & R. Felder, [1865])
- Godyris duillia (Hewitson, 1854)
- Godyris kedema (Hewitson, 1855)
- Godyris lauta (Haensch, 1910)
- Godyris mantura (Hewitson, 1876)
- Godyris nepos (Weymer, 1875)
- Godyris nubilosa Brabant, 2004
- Godyris panthyale (C. Felder & R. Felder, 1862)
- Godyris sappho (Haensch, 1910)
- Godyris zavaleta (Hewitson, 1855)
- Greta Hemming, 1934 20 spp. few Central America
- Haenschia Lamas, 2004 2 spp.
- Heterosais Godman & Salvin, [1880] 2 spp.
- Hyalenna Forbes, 1942 6 spp.
- Hyalyris antea (Hewitson, 1869)
- Hyalyris coeno (Doubleday, [1847])
- Hyalyris excelsa (C. Felder & R. Felder, 1862)
- Hyalyris fiammetta (Hewitson, 1852)
- Hyalyris juninensis Fox & Real, 1971
- Hyalyris latilimbata (Weymer, 1890)
- Hyalyris leptalina (C. Felder & R. Felder, 1865)
- Hyalyris ocna Herrich-Schäffer, 1865
- Hyalyris oulita (Hewitson, 1859)
- Hyalyris praxilla (Hewitson, 1870)
- Hyalyris schlingeri Real, 1971
- Hypoleria Godman & Salvin, [1879] 8 spp.
- Hypoleria adasa (Hewitson, [1855])
- Hypoleria alema (Hewitson, [1857])
- Hypoleria aureliana (Bates, 1862)
- Hypoleria jaruensis d'Almeida, 1951
- Hypoleria lavinia (Hewitson, [1855])
- Hypoleria ocalea (Doubleday & Hewitson, 1847)
- Hypoleria sarepta (Hewitson, [1852])
- Hypoleria xenophis Haensch, 1909
- Hyposcada Godman & Salvin, [1879] 8 spp.
- Hyposcada anchiala (Hewitson, 1868)
- Hyposcada attilodes Kaye, 1918
- Hyposcada illinissa (Hewitson, 1851)
- Hyposcada schausi Fox, 1941
- Hyposcada taliata (Hewitson, 1874)
- Hyposcada virginiana (Hewitson, 1856)
- Hyposcada zarepha (Hewitson, 1869)
- Hypothyris euclea (Godart, 1819)
- Hypothyris fluonia (Hewitson, 1854)
- Hypothyris gemella Fox, 1971
- Hypothyris leprieuri (Feisthamel, 1835)
- Hypothyris ninonia (Hübner, [1806])
- Hypothyris vallonia (Hewitson, [1853])
- Hypothyris xanthostola (Bates, 1862)
- Hypothyris anastasia (Bates, 1862)
- Hypothyris connexa (Hall, 1939)
- Hypothyris coeno (Doubleday, 1847)
- Hypothyris daphnis d'Almeida, 1945
- Hypothyris euclea (Godart, 1819)
- Hypothyris lycaste (Fabricius, 1793)
- Hypothyris mamercus (Hewitson, 1869)
- Hypothyris mansuetus (Hewitson, 1860)
- Hypothyris moebiusi (Haensch, 1903)
- Hypothyris semifulva (Salvin, 1869)
- Hypothyris thea (Hewitson, 1852)
- Hypothyris cantobrica (Hewitson, 1876)
- Ithomia Hübner, 1816 22 spp.
- Lycorea pasinuntia (Stoll, [1780])
- Lycorea halia (Hübner, 1816)
- Lycorea ilione (Cramer, [1775])
- Mcclungia cymo (Hübner, [1806])
- Mechanitis lysimnia (Fabricius, 1793)
- Mechanitis mazaeus Hewitson, 1860
- Mechanitis menapis Hewitson, 1856
- Mechanitis polymnia (Linnaeus, 1758)
- Megoleria Constantino, 1999 2 spp.
- Melinaea ethra (Godart, 1819)
- Melinaea idae (C. Felder & R. Felder, 1862)
- Melinaea isocomma Forbes, 1948
- Melinaea lilis (Doubleday, 1847)
- Melinaea ludovica (Cramer, [1780])
- Melinaea marsaeus (Hewitson, 1860)
- Melinaea menophilus (Hewitson, [1856])
- Melinaea mnasias (Hewitson, [1856])
- Melinaea mneme (Linnaeus, 1763)
- Melinaea mnemopsis Berg, 1897
- Melinaea satevis (Doubleday, 1847)
- Methona confusa Butler, 1873
- Methona curvifascia Weymer, 1883
- Methona grandior (Forbes, 1944)
- Methona maxima (Forbes, 1944)
- Methona megisto C. Felder & R. Felder, 1860
- Methona singularis (Staudinger, 1884)
- Methona themisto (Hübner, 1818)
- Napeogenes achaea (Hewitson, 1869)
- Napeogenes apulia (Hewitson, 1858)
- Napeogenes cranto C. Felder & R. Felder, 1865
- Napeogenes duessa (Hewitson, 1859)
- Napeogenes flossina Butler, 1873
- Napeogenes glycera Godman, 1899
- Napeogenes gracilis Haensch, 1905
- Napeogenes harbona (Hewitson, 1869)
- Napeogenes inachia (Hewitson, 1855)
- Napeogenes juanjuiensis Fox & Real, 1971
- Napeogenes larilla (Hewitson, 1877)
- Napeogenes larina (Hewitson, 1856)
- Napeogenes lycora (Hewitson, 1870)
- Napeogenes peridia (Hewitson, 1854)
- Napeogenes pharo (C. Felder & R. Felder, 1862)
- Napeogenes quadrilis Haensch, 1903
- Napeogenes rhezia (Geyer, [1834])
- Napeogenes sodalis Haensch, 1905
- Napeogenes stella (Hewitson, 1855)
- Napeogenes sylphis (Guérin-Méneville, [1844])
- Napeogenes sulphureophila Bryk, 1937
- Napeogenes tolosa (Hewitson, 1855)
- Napeogenes verticilla (Hewitson, 1874)
- Oleria Hübner, 1816 44 spp.
- Oleria antaxis (Haensch, 1909)
- Oleria astrea (Cramer, [1775])
- Oleria flora (Cramer, 1779)
- Oleria ilerdina (Hewitson, [1858])
- Olyras crathis Doubleday, [1847]
- Olyras insignis Salvin, 1869
- Pagyris Boisduval, 1870 3 spp.
- Paititia neglecta Lamas, 1979
- Patricia demylus (Godman & Salvin, 1879)
- Patricia oligyrtis (Hewitson, 1877)
- Patricia dercyllidas (Hewitson, 1864)
- Placidula euryanassa (C. Felder & R. Felder, 1860)
- Pseudoscada Godman & Salvin, [1879] 4 spp.
- Pseudoscada florula (Hewitson, [1855])
- Pteronymia Butler & H. Druce, 1872 42 spp. few Central America
- Pteronymia primula (Bates, 1862)
- Sais rosalia (Cramer, [1779])
- Sais browni Takahashi, 1977
- Scada karschina (Herbst, 1792)
- Scada kusa (Hewitson, 1872)
- Scada reckia (Hübner, [1808])
- Scada zemira (Hewitson, 1856)
- Scada zibia (Hewitson, 1856)
- Thyridia psidii (Linnaeus, 1758)
- Tithorea harmonia (Cramer, [1777])
- Tithorea pacifica Willmott & Lamas, 2004
- Tithorea tarricina Hewitson, 1858
- Veladyris pardalis (Salvin, 1869)
- Velamysta Haensch, 1909 3 spp.

=== Heliconiinae ===
- Actinote thalia (Linnaeus, 1758)
- Abananote Potts, 1943 5 spp.
- Agraulis vanillae (Boisduval & Le Conte en 1835)
- Altinote Potts, 1943 16 spp.
- Dione Hübner, [1819] 3 spp.
- Dione juno (Cramer, [1779])
- Dryadula phaetusa (Linnaeus, 1758)
- Dryas iulia (Fabricius, 1775)
- Eueides Hübner, 1816 12 spp.
- Eueides aliphera Godart, 1819
- Eueides isabella Cramer, 1781
- Eueides lampeto Bates, 1862
- Eueides libitina Staudinger, 1885
- Eueides lybia Fabricius, 1775
- Eueides tales (Cramer, [1775])
- Eueides vibilia Godart, 1819
- Euptoieta Doubleday, [1848] 8 spp. 1 U.S.
- Heliconius Kluk, 1780 40 spp.
- Heliconius antiochus (Linnaeus, 1767)
- Heliconius aoede (Hübner, [1813])
- Heliconius burneyi (Hübner, [1831])
- Heliconius charithonia (Linnaeus, 1767)
- Heliconius demeter Staudinger, [1897]
- Heliconius doris (Linnaeus, 1771)
- Heliconius egeria (Cramer, 1775)
- Heliconius elevatus Nöldner, 1901
- Heliconius erato (Linnaeus, 1764)
- Heliconius ethilla Godart, 1819
- Heliconius godmani Staudinger, 1882
- Heliconius hecale (Fabricius, 1775)
- Heliconius lalitae Brévignon, 1996
- Heliconius melpomene (Linnaeus, 1758)
- Heliconius metharme (Erichson, [1849])
- Heliconius metis (Moreira & Mielke, 2010)
- Heliconius numata (Cramer, [1780])
- Heliconius ricini (Linnaeus, 1758)
- Heliconius telesiphe Doubleday, 1874
- Heliconius wallacei Reakirt, 1866
- Heliconius xanthocles Bates, 1862
- Philaethria Billberg, 1820 7 spp.
- Philaethria andrei Brevignon, 2002
- Philaethria pygmalion (Fruhstorfer, 1912)
- Podotricha judith (Guérin-Méneville, [1844])
- Podotricha telesiphe (Hewitson, 1867)

=== Libytheinae ===
- Libytheana carinenta (Cramer, [1777])

=== Limenitidinae ===
- Adelpha abia (Hewitson, 1850)
- Adelpha alala (Hewitson, 1847)
- Adelpha amazona Austin & Jasinski, 1999
- Adelpha aricia (Hewitson, 1847)
- Adelpha atlantica Willmott, 2003
- Adelpha attica (C. Felder & R. Felder, [1867])
- Adelpha barnesia Schaus, 1902
- Adelpha basiloides (Bates, 1865)
- Adelpha boeotia (C. Felder & R. Felder, [1867])
- Adelpha boreas (Butler, [1866])
- Adelpha calliphane Fruhstorfer, 1915
- Adelpha capucinus (Walch, 1775)
- Adelpha cocala (Cramer, [1779])
- Adelpha corcyra (Hewitson, 1847)
- Adelpha cytherea (Linnaeus, 1758)
- Adelpha delinita Fruhstorfer, 1913
- Adelpha epizygis Fruhstorfer, 1915
- Adelpha erotia (Hewitson, 1847)
- Adelpha ethelda (Hewitson, 1867)
- Adelpha fabricia Fruhstorfer, 1913
- Adelpha falcipennis Fruhstorfer, 1915
- Adelpha fessonia (Hewitson, 1847)
- Adelpha gavina Fruhstorfer, 1915
- Adelpha heraclea (C. Felder & R. Felder, [1867])
- Adelpha herbita Weymer, 1907
- Adelpha hyas (Doyère, [1840])
- Adelpha iphicleola (Bates, 1864)
- Adelpha iphiclus (Linnaeus, 1758)
- Adelpha irmina (Doubleday, [1848])
- Adelpha justina (C. Felder & R. Felder, 1861)
- Adelpha leuceria (H. Druce, 1874)
- Adelpha lycorias (Godart, [1824])
- Adelpha malea (C. Felder & R. Felder, 1861)
- Adelpha melona (Hewitson, 1847)
- Adelpha mesentina (Cramer, [1777])
- Adelpha messana (C. Felder & R. Felder, [1867])
- Adelpha naxia (C. Felder & R. Felder, [1867])
- Adelpha mythra (Godart, [1824])
- Adelpha nea (Hewitson, 1847)
- Adelpha olynthia (C. Felder & R. Felder, [1867])
- Adelpha paraena (Bates, 1865)
- Adelpha phylaca (Bates, 1866)
- Adelpha plesaure Hübner, 1823
- Adelpha pollina Fruhstorfer, 1915
- Adelpha poltius Hall, 1938
- Adelpha radiata Fruhstorfer, 1915
- Adelpha salus Hall, 1935
- Adelpha salmoneus (Butler, [1866])
- Adelpha saundersii (Hewitson, 1867)
- Adelpha seriphia (C. Felder & R. Felder, [1867])
- Adelpha serpa (Boisduval, [1836])
- Adelpha sichaeus (Butler, [1866])
- Adelpha thesprotia (C. Felder & R. Felder, [1867])
- Adelpha thessalia (C. Felder & R. Felder, [1867])
- Adelpha thoasa (Hewitson, 1850)
- Adelpha viola Fruhstorfer, 1913
- Adelpha ximena (C. Felder & R. Felder, 1862)
- Adelpha zea (Hewitson, 1850)
- Adelpha zina (Hewitson, 1867)

=== Morphinae ===
- Antirrhea ornata (Butler, 1870)
- Antirrhea philoctetes (Linnaeus, 1758)
- Aponarope sutor (Stichel, 1916)
- Bia actorion (Linnaeus, 1763)
- Bia peruana Röber, 1904
- Blepolenis Röber, 1906
- Brassolis astyra Godart, [1824]
- Brassolis haenschi Stichel, 1902
- Brassolis isthmia Bates, 1864
- Brassolis sophorae (Linnaeus, 1758)
- Caerois chorinaeus (Fabricius, 1775)
- Caligo Hübner, [1819] 20 species
- Caligo euphorbus (C. Felder & R. Felder, 1862)
- Caligo eurilochus (Cramer, [1775])
- Caligo idomeneus (Linnaeus, 1758)
- Caligo teucer (Linnaeus, 1758)
- Caligopsis seleucida (Hewitson, 1877)
- Catoblepia berecynthia (Cramer, [1777])
- Catoblepia versitincta (Stichel, 1901)
- Catoblepia xanthicles (Godman & Salvin, [1881])
- Catoblepia xanthus (Linnaeus, 1758)
- Dasyophthalma creusa (Hübner, [1821])
- Dasyophthalma geraensis Rebel, 1922
- Dasyophthalma rusina (Godart, [1824])
- Dasyophthalma vertebralis Butler, 1869
- Dynastor darius (Fabricius, 1775)
- Dynastor macrosiris (Westwood, 1851)
- Dynastor napoleon Doubleday, 1849
- Eryphanis automedon (Cramer, [1775])
- Eryphanis aesacus (Herrich-Schäffer, 1850)
- Eryphanis gerhardi (Weeks, 1902)
- Eryphanis reevesii (Doubleday, [1849])
- Eryphanis zolvizora (Hewitson, 1877)
- Morpho amphitryon Staudinger, 1887
- Morpho hercules (Dalman, 1823)
- Morpho richardus Fruhstorfer, 1898
- Morpho cisseis C. Felder & R. Felder, 1860
- Morpho hecuba (Linnaeus, 1771)
- Morpho telemachus (Linnaeus, 1758)
- Morpho theseus Deyrolle, 1860
- Morpho anaxibia (Esper, 1801)
- Morpho sulkowskyi (Kollar, 1850)
- Morpho lympharis Butler, 1873
- Morpho rhodopteron Godman & Salvin, 1880
- Morpho portis (Hübner, [1821])
- Morpho zephyritis Butler, 1873
- Morpho aega (Hübner, [1822])
- Morpho eugenia Deyrolle, 1860
- Morpho marcus (Schaller, 1785)
- Morpho uraneis Bates, 1865
- Morpho aurora (Westwood, 1851)
- Morpho cypris Westwood, 1851
- Morpho rhetenor (Cramer, [1775])
- Morpho helena Staudinger, 1890
- Morpho polyphemus Westwood, [1850]
- Morpho epistrophus (Fabricius, 1796)
- Morpho menelaus (Linnaeus, 1758)
- Morpho deidamia (Hübner, [1819]) – Deidamia morpho
- Morpho helenor (Cramer, 1776) – Helenor morpho
- Morpho peleides (Kollar, 1850)
- Morpho achilles (Linnaeus, 1758)
- Morpho absoloni May, 1924
- Morpho athena Otero, 1966
- Morpho niepelti Röber, 1927
- Narope albopunctum (Stichel, 1904)
- Narope anartes (Hewitson, 1874)
- Narope cauca (Casagrande, 2002)
- Narope cyllabarus (Westwood, 1851)
- Narope cyllarus (Westwood, 1851)
- Narope cyllastros (Doubleday, 1849)
- Narope cyllene (C. Felder & R. Felder, 1859)
- Narope dentimaculatus (Talbot, 1928)
- Narope guilhermei (Casagrande, 1989)
- Narope marmorata (Schaus, 1902)
- Narope minor (Casagrande, 2002)
- Narope nesope (Hewitson, 1869)
- Narope obidos (Casagrande, 2002)
- Narope panniculus (Stichel, 1904)
- Narope syllabus (Staudinger, 1887)
- Narope ybyra (Casagrande, 2002)
- Opoptera aorsa (Godart, [1824])
- Opoptera arsippe (Hopffer, 1874)
- Opoptera bracteolata Stichel, 1901
- Opoptera hilaris Stichel, 1901
- Opoptera staudingeri (Godman & Salvin, 1894)
- Opoptera fruhstorferi (Röber, 1896)
- Opoptera sulcius (Staudinger, 1887)
- Opoptera syme (Hübner, [1821])
- Opsiphanes cassiae (Linnaeus, 1758)
- Opsiphanes cassina C. Felder & R. Felder, 1862
- Opsiphanes invirae (Hübner, [1808])
- Orobrassolis ornamentalis (Stichel, 1906)
- Penetes pamphanis Doubleday, [1849]
- Selenophanes cassiope (Cramer, [1775])
- Selenophanes supremus Stichel, 1901
- Selenophanes josephus (Godman & Salvin, [1881])

=== Nymphalinae ===
- Anartia amathea (Linnaeus, 1758)
- Anartia jatrophae (Linnaeus, 1763)
- Baeotus Hemming, 1939 3 spp.
- Baeotus aeilus (Stoll, 1780)
- Chlosyne janais (Drury, [1782])
- Chlosyne hippodrome (Geyer, 1837)
- Chlosyne narva (Fabricius, 1793)
- Chlosyne lacinia (Geyer, 1837)
- Chlosyne erodyle (Bates, 1864)
- Chlosyne theona (Ménétriés, 1855)
- Colobura annulata Willmott, Constantino & Hall, 2001
- Colobura dirce (Linnaeus, 1758)
- Eresia clio (Linnaeus, 1758)
- Eresia erysice (Geyer, 1832)
- Eresia eunice (Hübner, [1807]);
- Eresia nauplius (Linnaeus, 1758)
- Eresia perna Hewitson, [1852]
- Historis acheronta (Fabricius, 1775)
- Hypanartia Hübner, [1821] 14 spp.
- Hypolimnas misippus (Linnaeus, 1764)
- Janatella hera (Cramer, [1779])
- Junonia evarete (Cramer, [1779])
- Junonia genoveva (Cramer, [1780])
- Metamorpha elissa Hübner, [1819]
- Ortilia liriope (Cramer, [1775])
- Siproeta epaphus (Latreille, 1813)
- Siproeta stelenes (Linnaeus, 1758)
- Smyrna blomfildia (Fabricius, 1781)
- Tegosa claudina (Eschscholtz, 1821)
- Telenassa fontus (Hall, 1928)
- Tigridia acesta (Linnaeus, 1758)
- Pycina zamba Doubleday, [1849]
- Victorinini Scudder, 1893

=== Satyrinae ===
- Altopedaliodes Forster, 1964 9 spp.
- Amiga arnaca (Fabricius, 1776)
- Amphidecta calliomma (C. Felder & R. Felder, 1862)
- Antopedaliodes antonia (Staudinger, 1897)
- Apexacuta Pyrcz, 2004 4 spp.
- Archeuptychia cluena (Drury, 1782)
- Argyrophorus argenteus Blanchard, 1852
- Arhuaco ica Adams & Bernard, 1977
- Auca Hayward, 1953 4 spp.
- Capronnieria galesus (Godart, [1824])
- Caenoptychia boulleti Le Cerf, 1919
- Caeruleuptychia Forster, 1964 19 spp.
- Caeruleuptychia brixius (Godart, [1824])
- Caeruleuptychia caerulea (Butler, 1869)
- Caeruleuptychia helios (Weymer, 1911)
- Caeruleuptychia penicillata (Godman, 1905)
- Caeruleuptychia twalela Brévignon, 2005
- Calisto zangis (Fabricius, 1775)
- Cepheuptychia Forster, 1964 4 spp.
- Cepheuptychia cephus (Fabricius, 1775)
- Cercyeuptychia luederwaldti (Spitz, 1931)
- Cheimas opalinus (Staudinger, 1897)
- Chillanella stelligera (Butler, 1881)
- Chloreuptychia Forster, 1964 10 spp.
- Chloreuptychia chlorimene (Hübner, [1819])
- Chloreuptychia herseis (Godart, [1824])
- Chloreuptychia hewitsonii (Butler, 1867)
- Chloreuptychia tolumnia (Cramer, 1777)
- Cissia Doubleday, 1848 15 spp. some Central America
- Cissia lesbia (Staudinger, [1886]
- Cissia maripa Brévignon, 2005
- Cissia myncea (Cramer, 1780)
- Cissia penelope (Fabricius, 1775)
- Cissia terrestris (Butler, 1867)
- Cithaerias Hübner, [1819] 5 spp.
- Cithaerias andromeda (Fabricius, 1775)
- Coeruleotaygetis periboea (Godman & Salvin, 1880)
- Corades Hewitson, 1849 19 spp.
- Corades enyo Hewitson, 1849
- Corderopedaliodes Forster, 1964 3 spp.
- Cosmosatyrus leptoneuroides C. Felder & R. Felder, [1867]
- Daedalma Hewitson, 1858 8 spp.
- Dangond dangondi Adams & Bernard, 1979
- Druphila venerata (Butler, 1873)
- Dulcedo polita (Hewitson, 1869)
- Elina Blanchard, 1852 2 spp.
- Eretris Thieme, 1905 17 spp.
- Erichthodes Forster, 1964 5 spp.
- Erichthodes antonina (C. Felder & R. Felder, [1867])
- Etcheverrius Herrera, 1965 2 spp.
- Eteona tisiphone (Boisduval, [1836])
- Euptychia Hübner, 1818 15 spp.
- Euptychia marceli Brévignon, 2005
- Euptychia mollina suzannae Brévignon, 2005
- Euptychia neildi Brévignon, 2005
- Euptychia rufocincta Weymer, 1911
- Euptychia westwoodi muli Brévignon, 2005
- Euptychoides Forster, 1964 10 spp.
- Faunula C. Felder & R. Felder, [1867] 2 spp.
- Foetterleia schreineri (Foetterle, 1902)
- Forsterinaria Gray, 1973 23 spp.
- Godartiana Forster, 1964 2 spp.
- Haetera Fabricius, 1807 2 spp.
- Haetera piera (Linnaeus, 1758)
- Harjesia Forster, 1964 5 spp.
- Harjesia blanda (Möschler, 1877)
- Harjesia griseola (Weyner, 1910)
- Harjesia gulnare (Butler, 1870) syn Harjesia oreba
- Haywardella edmondsii (Butler, 1881)
- Hermeuptychia Forster, 1964 8 spp.
- Hermeuptychia hermes (Fabricius, 1775)
- Homoeonympha C. Felder & R. Felder, [1867] 4 spp.
- Junea Hemming, 1964 2 spp.
- Lasiophila C. Felder & R. Felder, 1859 13 spp.
- Lymanopoda Westwood, [1851] 54 spp.
- Magneuptychia Forster, 1964 29 spp. few Central America
- Magneuptychia divergens (Butler, 1867)
- Magneuptychia gera (Hewitson, 1850)
- Magneuptychia harpyia (C. Felder & R. Felder, 1867)
- Magneuptychia iris (C. Felder & R. Felder, 1867)
- Magneuptychia lea (Cramer, [1780])
- Magneuptychia libye (Linnaeus, 1767)
- Magneuptychia modesta (Butler, 1867)
- Magneuptychia murrayae Brévignon, 2005
- Magneuptychia newtoni (A.Hall, 1939)
- Magneuptychia ocypete (Fabricius, 1776)
- Magneuptychia tricolor (Hewitson, 1850)
- Manataria hercyna (Hübner, [1821])
- Megeuptychia Forster, 1964 2 spp.
- Megeuptychia antonoe (Cramer, 1775)
- Moneuptychia Forster, 1964 5 spp.
- Mygona Thieme, 1907 4 spp.
- Nelia Hayward, 1953 2 spp.
- Neomaenas Wallengren, 1858 8 spp.
- Neonympha nerita Capronnier, 1881
- Neopedaliodes Viloria, Miller & Miller, 2004 10 spp.
- Neosatyrus ambiorix Wallengren, 1860
- Oressinoma Doubleday, [1849] 2 spp.
- Oxeoschistus Butler, 1867 11 spp.
- Palmaris Herrera, 1965 4 spp.
- Pampasatyrus Hayward, 1953 9 spp.
- Pamperis poaoeneis Heimlich, 1959
- Panyapedaliodes Forster, 1964 14 spp.
- Paramo oculata (Krüger, 1924)
- Parapedaliodes parepa (Hewitson, 1862)
- Parataygetis Forster, 1964 2 spp.
- Pareuptychia Forster, 1964 7 spp.
- Pareuptychia binocula (Butler, 1869)
- Pareuptychia hervei Brévignon, 2005
- Pareuptychia hesionides deviae Brévignon, 2005
- Pareuptychia lydia (Cramer, 1777)
- Pareuptychia ocirrhoe (Fabricius, 1775)
- Paryphthimoides Forster, 1964 13 spp.
- Paryphthimoides argulus (Godart, [1824])
- Paryphthimoides undulata (Butler, 1867)
- Pedaliodes Butler, 1867 158 spp.
- Pharneuptychia Forster, 1964 6 spp.
- Pherepedaliodes Forster, 1964 3 spp.
- Physcopedaliodes physcoa (Hewitson, 1862)
- Pierella Herrich-Schäffer, 1865 11 spp.
- Pierella astyoche (Erichson, [1849])
- Pierella lamia (Sulzer, 1776)
- Pierella hyalinus (Gmelin, [1790])
- Pierella lena (Linnaeus, 1767)
- Pierella lucia Weymer, 1885
- Pierella helvina (Hewitson, 1859)
- Pierella hortona (Hewitson, 1854)
- Posttaygetis penelea (Cramer, 1775)
- Praefaunula Forster, 1964 3 spp.
- Praepedaliodes Forster, 1964 4 spp.
- Praepronophila Forster, 1964 3 spp.
- Proboscis Thieme, 1907 2 spp.
- Pronophila Doubleday, [1849] 18 spp.
- Protopedaliodes Viloria & Pyrcz, 1994 3 spp.
- Pseudeuptychia Forster, 1964 2 spp.
- Pseudodebis Forster, 1964 5 spp.
- Pseudodebis marpessa (Hewitson, 1862)
- Pseudodebis valentina (Cramer, 1779)
- Pseudohaetera Brown, 1943 2 spp.
- Pseudohaetera hypaesia (Hewitson, 1854)
- Pseudomaniola Röber, [1889] 10 spp.
- Punapedaliodes Forster, 1964 2 spp.
- Punargentus Heimlich, 1963 2 spp.
- Quilaphoetosus Herrera, 1966 2 spp.
- Rareuptychia clio (Weymer, 1911)
- Redonda Adams & Bernard, 1981 2 spp.
- Sierrasteroma polyxo (Godman & Salvin, 1880)
- Spinantenna tristis (Guérin-Méneville, [1838])
- Splendeuptychia Forster, 1964 23 spp.
- Splendeuptychia clorimena (Stoll, 1780)
- Splendeuptychia furina (Hewintson, 1862)
- Splendeuptychia itonis (Hewintson, 1862)
- Splendeuptychia purusana ( Aurivillius, 1929)
- Steremnia Thieme, 1905 7 spp.
- Steroma Westwood, [1850] 3 spp.
- Steromapedaliodes Forster, 1964 4 spp.
- Taydebis peculiaris (Butler, 1874)
- Taygetina banghaasi (Weymer, 1910)
- Taygetis Hübner, [1819] 27 spp. a few Central America
- Taygetis cleopatra C. Felder & R. Felder, 1862
- Taygetis echo (Cramer, 1775)
- Taygetis laches (Fabricius, 1793)
- Taygetis mermeria Cramer, 1776
- Taygetis oyapock Brévignon, 2007
- Taygetis rufomarginata Staudinger, 1888
- Taygetis thamyra (Cramer, 1779)
- Taygetis virgilia (Cramer, 1776)
- Taygetis zippora (Butler, 1869)
- Taygetomorpha Miller, 2004 2 spp.
- Taygetomorpha celia (Cramer, 1779)
- Tetraphlebia germainii C. Felder & R. Felder, [1867]
- Thiemeia phoronea (Doubleday, [1849])
- Yphthimoides Forster, 1964 23 spp.
- Yphthimoides renata (Stoll, 1780)
- Yphthimoides eriphule (Butler, 1867)
- Zischkaia Forster, 1964 4 spp.

== Hesperiidae ==
=== Hesperiinae ===
- Anatrytone barbara (Williams & Bell, 1931)
- Anatrytone sarah Burns, 1994
- Arotis bryna (Evans, 1955)
- Arotis evansi (Mielke, 1972)
- Artines aepitus (Geyer, [1832])
- Atalopedes campestris (Boisduval, 1852)
- Carystoides yenna Evans, 1955
- Carystus hocus Evans, 1955
- Copaeodes jean Evans, 1955
- Corticea lysias (Plötz, 1883)
- Cymaenes alumna (Butler, 1877)
- Cynea anthracinus (Mabille, 1877)
- Cynea cyrus (Plötz, 1882)
- Cynea diluta (Herrich-Schäffer, 1869)
- Cynea robba Evans, 1955
- Enosis iccius Evans, 1955
- Eutychide subpunctata Hayward, 1940
- Lerema ancillaris (Butler, 1877)
- Mnasilus allubita (Butler, 1877)
- Nastra guianae (Lindsey, 1925)
- Orphe vatinius Godman, [1901]
- Orthos trinka Evans, 1955;
- Papias ignarus (Bell, 1932)
- Papias phaeomelas (Hübner, [1831])
- Papias phainis Godman, [1900]
- Paracarystys hypargyra (Herrich-Schäffer, 1869)
- Penicula advena (Draudt, 1923)
- Perichares butus (Möschler, 1877)
- Phanes almoda (Hewitson, 1866)
- Phemiades pohli (Bell, 1932)
- Phlebodes campo (Bell, 1947)
- Polites vibex (Geyer, [1832])
- Propertius phineus (Cramer, [1777])
- Quasimellana angra (Evans, 1955)
- Quasimellana eulogius (Plötz, 1883)
- Quasimellana pandora (Hayward, 1940)
- Saliana severus (Mabille, 1895)
- Saliana vixen Evans, 1955
- Saturnus reticulata (Plötz, 1883)
- Saturnus saturnus (Fabricius, 1787)
- Thargella caura (Plötz, 1882)
- Vettius marcus (Fabricius, 1787)
- Vettius phyllus (Cramer, [1777])
- Wallengrenia otho (Smith, 1797)

=== Pyrginae ===
- Camptopleura termon (Hopffer, 1874)
- Carrhenes fuscescens (Mabille, 1891)
- Charidia lucaria (Hewitson, 1868)
- Chiomara basigutta (Plötz, 1884)
- Chiomara mithrax (Möschler, 1879)
- Clito clito (Fabricius, 1787)
- Clito littera (Mabille, 1877)
- Ebrietas evanidus Mabille, 1898
- Eracon clinias (Mabille, 1878)
- Heliopetes arsalte (Linnaeus, 1758)
- Heliopyrgus domicella (Erichson, 1848)
- Iliana heros (Mabille & Boullet, 1917)
- Milanion hemes (Cramer, [1777])
- Milanion leucaspis (Mabille, 1878)
- Morvina falisca (Hewitson, 1878)
- Nisoniades brunneata (Williams & Bell, 1939)
- Nisoniades ephora (Herrich-Schäffer, 1870)
- Nisoniades guianae (Williams & Bell, 1939)
- Nisoniades laurentina (Williams & Bell, 1939)
- Nisoniades macarius (Herrich-Schäffer, 1870)
- Nisoniades mimas (Cramer, [1775])
- Nisoniades rubescens (Möschler, 1877)
- Onenses kelso Evans, 1953
- Ouleus juxta (Bell, 1934)
- Pachyneuria lista Evans, 1953
- Paramimus scurra (Hübner, [1809])
- Plumbago pulverea (Mabille, 1878)
- Pseudodrephalys atinas Mabille, 1888
- Pseudodrephalys hypargus (Mabille, 1891)
- Pyrdalus corbulo (Stoll, [1781])
- Pythonides lerina (Hewitson, 1868)
- Pythonides limaea (Hewitson, 1868)
- Quadrus contubernalis (Mabille, 1883)
- Quadrus deyrollei (Mabille, 1887)
- Sostrata festiva (Erichson, [1849])
- Staphylus incisus (Mabille, 1878)
- Xenophanes tryxus (Stoll, [1780])

=== Eudaminae ===
- Achalarus albociliatus (Mabille, 1877)
- Aguna R. Williams, 1927 26 spp. a few Central America
- Aguna coelus (Stoll, [1781])
- Astraptes Hübner, [1819] 29 spp.
- Augiades crinisus (Cramer, [1780])
- Augiades epimethea (Plötz, 1883)
- Autochton bipunctatus (Gmelin, [1790])
- Autochton integrifascia (Mabille, 1891)
- Autochton itylus Hübner, [1823]
- Autochton longipennis (Plötz, 1882)
- Autochton neis (Geyer, 1832)
- Autochton reflexus (Mabille & Boullet, 1912)
- Autochton sulfureolus (Mabille, 1883)
- Autochton vectilucis (Butler, 1872)
- Autochton zarex (Hübner, 1818)
- Bungalotis Watson, 1893 10 spp. some Central America
- Bungalotis borax Evans, 1952
- Bungalotis midas (Cramer, [1775])
- Cabares potrillo (Lucas, 1857
- Cabares rinta Evans, 1952
- Cabirus procas (Cramer, [1777])
- Calliades oryx (C. Felder & R. Felder, 1862)
- Calliades zeutus (Möschler, 1879)
- Cecropterus acanthopoda (Mielke, 1977)
- Celaenorrhinus shema (Hewitson, 1877)
- Cephise Evans, 1952 12 spp. a few Central America
- Chioides catillus (Cramer, [1780])
- Chioides iverna Evans, 1952
- Chioides zilpa (Butler, 1872)
- Chrysoplectrum E. Watson, 1893 10 spp. one Central America
- Codatracus alcaeus (Hewitson, 1867)
- Codatractus aminias (Hewitson, 1867)
- Codatractus carlos Evans, 1952
- Codatractus imalena (Butler, 1872)
- Cogia abdul Hayward, 1947
- Cogia azila Evans, 1953
- Cogia calchas (Herrich-Schäffer, 1869)
- Cogia cerradicola (Mielke, 1967)
- Cogia elaites (Hewitson, 1867)
- Cogia grandis Riley, 1921
- Cogia hassan Butler, 1870
- Cogia hippalus hester Evans, 1953
- Cogia punctilia Plötz, 1882
- Cogia troilus Mabille, 1898
- Drephalys E. Watson, 1893 16 spp.
- Drephalys olvina Evans, 1952
- Drephalys oriander (Hewitson, 1867)
- Drephalys talboti (Le Cerf, 1922)
- Dyscophellus euribates (Stoll, [1782])
- Dyscophellus sebaldus (Stoll, [1781])
- Ectomis cythna (Hewitson, 1878)
- Entheus Hübner, [1819] 14 spp. few Central America
- Entheus gentius (Cramer, 1777)
- Entheus priassus (Linnaeus, 1758)
- Epargyreus aspina Evans, 1952
- Epargyreus barisses (Hewitson, 1874)
- Epargyreus clarus (Cramer, [1775])
- Epargyreus enispe (Hewitson, 1867)
- Epargyreus exadeus (Cramer, [1780])
- Epargyreus nutra Evans, 1952
- Epargyreus socus (Hübner, [1825])
- Epargyreus spina Evans, 1952
- Epargyreus spinta Evans, 1952
- Heronia labriaris (Butler, 1877)
- Hyalothyrus leucomelas (Geyer, [1832])
- Hyalothyrus mimicus Mabille & Boullet, 1919
- Hyalothyrus neleus (Linnaeus, 1758)
- Hyalothyrus infernalis (Möschler, 1877)
- Hypocryptothrix teutas (Hewitson, 1876)
- Marella tamyris Mabille, 1903
- Marela tamyroides (C. Felder & R. Felder, [1867])
- Narcosius Steinhauser, 1986 12 spp.
- Narcosius aulina (Evans, 1952)
- Nascus broteas (Cramer, 1780)
- Nascus paulliniae (Sepp, [1842])
- Nerula fibrena (Hewitson, 1877)
- Nerula tuba Evans, 1953
- Oechydrus chersis (Herrich-Schäffer, 1869)
- Oileides azines (Hewitson, 1867)
- Oileides fenestratus (Gmelin, [1790])
- Oileides vulpinus Hübner, [1825]
- Phanus australis Miller, 1965
- Phanus ecitonorum Austin, 1993
- Phanus grandis Austin, 1993
- Phanus obscurior Kaye, 1925
- Phanus vitreus (Stoll, [1781])
- Phareas coeleste Westwood, [1852]
- Phocides Hübner, [1819] 18 spp.
- Phocides charon C. Felder & R. Felder, 1859)
- Phocides distans Herrich-Schäffer, 1869)
- Phocides johnsoni Bell, 1947
- Phocides lincea (Herrich-Schäffer, 1869)
- Phocides metrodorus Bell, 1932
- Phocides novalis Evans, 1952
- Phocides oreides (Hewitson, [1875])
- Phocides padrona Evans, 1952
- Phocides partia Evans, 1952
- Phocides perillus (Mabille, 1888)
- Phocides pialia (Hewitson, 1857)
- Phocides pigmalion (Cramer, [1779])
- Phocides polybius (Fabricius, 1793)
- Phocides thermus (Mabille, 1883)
- Phocides urania (Westwood, [1852])
- Phocides vulcanides Röber, 1925
- Phocides yokhara (Butler, 1870)
- Polygonus leo (Gmelin, [1790])
- Polygonus savigny (Latreille, [1824])
- Polythrix E. Watson, 1893 14 species a few Central America
- Polythrix auginus (Hewitson, 1867)
- Porphyrogenes sororcula (Mabille & Boullet, 1912)
- Proteides mercurius (Fabricius, 1787)
- Ridens bidens Austin, 1998
- Ridens bridgmani (Weeks, 1902)
- Ridens fulima Evans, 1952
- Ridens fulminans (Herrich-Schäffer, 1869)
- Ridens harpagus (C. Felder & R. Felder, 1867)
- Ridens mephitis (Hewitson, 1876)
- Ridens nora Evans, 1952
- Ridens pacasa (Williams, 1927)
- Ridens panche (Williams, 1927)
- Ridens philistus (Hopffer, 1874)
- Ridens ridens (Hewitson, 1876)
- Ridens telegonoides (Mabille & Boullet, 1912)
- Ridens tristis (Draudt, [1922])
- Salatis cebrenus (Cramer, 1777)
- Salatis flavomarginatus (Sepp, [1851])
- Salatis fulvius (Plötz, 1882)
- Salatis salatis (Stoll, [1782])
- Salatis scyrus (Bell, 1934)
- Spathilepia clonius (Cramer, [1775])
- Tarsoctenus Watson, 1893 3 spp.
- Tarsoctenus praecia (Hewitson, [1857])
- Telemiades Hübner, [1819] 18 spp.
- Telemiades epicalus Hübner, [1819]
- Telemiades nicomedes (Möschler, 1879)
- Thessia athesis (Hewitson, 1867)
- Typhedanus Butler, 1870 10 spp.
- Udranomia eurus (Mabille & Boullet, 1919)
- Udranomia kikkawai (Weeks, 1906)
- Udranomia orcinus (C. Felder & R. Felder, [1867])
- Udranomia spitzi (Hayward, 1942)
- Urbanus proteus (Linnaeus, 1758)
- Urbanus esmeraldus (Butler, 1877)
- Urbanus esma Evans, 1952
- Urbanus esta Evans, 1952
- Urbanus velinus (Plötz, 1880)
- Urbanus villus Austin, 1998
- Urbanus longicaudus Austin, 1998
- Urbanus parvus Austin, 1998
- Urbanus ambiguus de Jong, 1983
- Urbanus belli (Hayward, 1935)
- Urbanus carmelita (Herrich-Schäffer, 1869)
- Urbanus chalco (Hübner, 1823)
- Urbanus cindra Evans, 1952
- Urbanus dorantes (Stoll, [1790])
- Urbanus doryssus (Swainson, 1831)
- Urbanus dubius Steinhauser, 1981
- Urbanus elmina Evans, 1952
- Urbanus evenus (Ménétriés, 1855)
- Urbanus huancavillcas (Williams, 1926)
- Urbanus magnus Steinhauser, 1981
- Urbanus procne (Plötz, 1880)
- Urbanus pronus Evans, 1952
- Urbanus reductus (Riley, 1919)
- Urbanus tanna Evans, 1952
- Urbanus viterboana (Ehrmann, 1907)
- Urbanus zagorus (Plötz, 1880)
- Urbanus lucida Plötz
- Urbanus albimargo (Mabille, 1875)
- Urbanus procne (Plötz, 1880)
- Urbanus simplicius (Stoll, [1790])
- Urbanus teleus (Hübner, 1821)
- Urbanus velinus (Plötz, 1880)
- Urbanus virescens (Mabille, 1877)

=== Pyrrhopyginae ===
- Aspitha aspitha (Hewitson, [1866])
- Croniades pieria (Hewitson, [1857])
- Jemadia fallax (Mabille, 1878)
- Jemadia gnetus (Fabricius, 1781)
- Jemadia hewitsonii (Mabille, 1878)
- Mysarbia sejanus Hopffer,1874
- Myscelus assaricus (Cramer, [1779])
- Myscelus pegasus Mabille, 1903;
- Myscelus santhilarius (Latreille, [1824])
- Mysoria barcastus (Sepp, [1851])
- Parelbella ahira (Hewitson, [1866])
- Parelbella polyzona (Latreille, [1824])
- Passova glacia Evans, 1951;
- Passova passova (Hewitson, [1866])
- Protelbella alburna (Mabille, 1891)
- Pyrrhopyge Hübner, [1819] endemic, speciose - See genus for species list and distribution.
- Pyrrhopyge amyclas (Cramer, 1779)
- Pyrrhopyge amythaon Bell, 1931
- Pyrrhopyge arinas (Cramer, 1777)
- Pyrrhopyge creusae (Bell, 1931)
- Pyrrhopyge evansi Bell, 1947 or Pyrrhopyge phidias evansi
- Pyrrhopyge phidias (Linnaeus, 1758)
- Pyrrhopyge proculus Hopffer, 1874
- Pyrrhopyge sergius Hopffer, 1874
- Pyrrhopyge thericles Mabille, 1891
- Yanguna thelersa (Hewitson, 1866)
