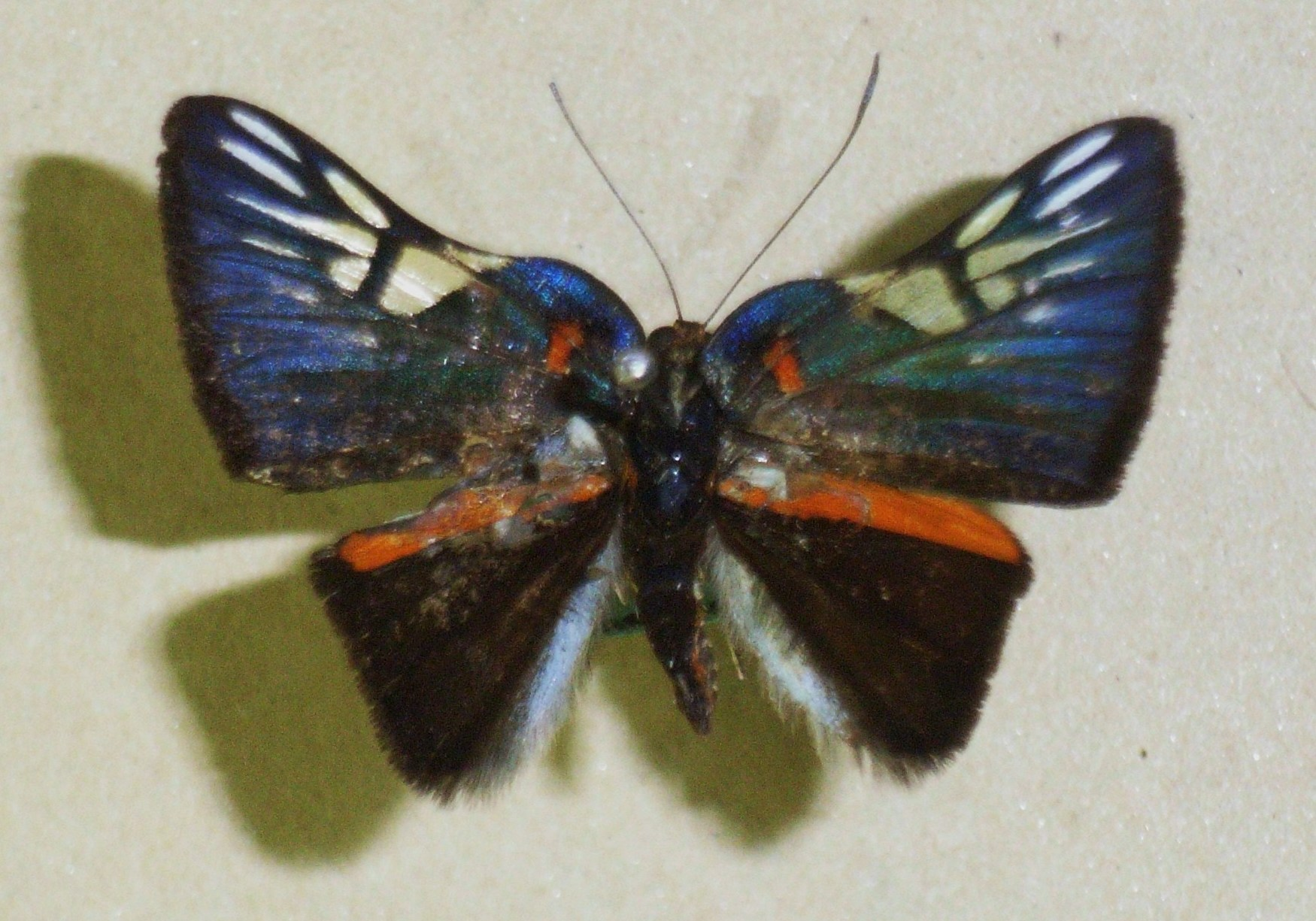
- Symmachia accusatrix

Scientific classification
- Kingdom: Animalia
- Phylum: Arthropoda
- Clade: Pancrustacea
- Class: Insecta
- Order: Lepidoptera
- Family: Riodinidae
- Subfamily: Riodininae
- Tribe: Symmachiini; Bates, 1859

Genera
- See text

= Symmachiini =

Tribe of butterflies

The Symmachiini are a tribe of metalmark butterflies (family Riodinidae).

== Genera ==
As numerous Riodinidae genera have not yet been unequivocally assigned to a tribe, the genus list is preliminary.

- Chimastrum
- Esthemopsis
- Lucillella
- Mesene
- Mesenopsis
- Panaropsis
- Phaenochitonia
- Pirascca
- Pterographium
- Stichelia
- Symmachia
- Xenandra
- Xynias
