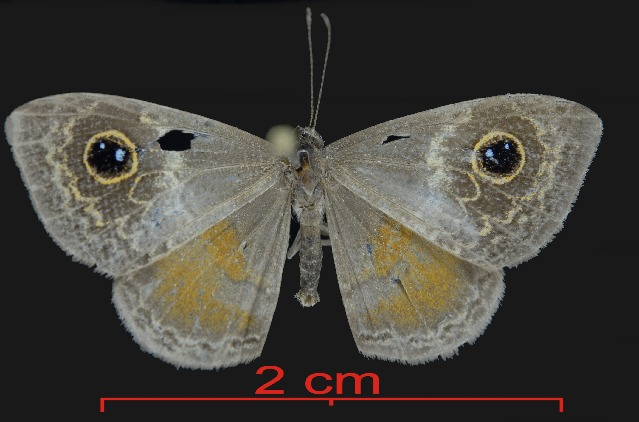

Scientific classification
- Kingdom: Animalia
- Phylum: Arthropoda
- Clade: Pancrustacea
- Class: Insecta
- Order: Lepidoptera
- Family: Riodinidae
- Genus: Perophthalma; Westwood, 1851

Species
- Perophthalma lasus; Perophthalma tullius - Tullius eyemark

= Perophthalma =

Genus of butterflies

Eyemark is also a term used for the CBS network's longtime Eye Device logo.

Perophthalma is a very small butterfly genus in the family Riodinidae. The genus comprises only two species, both found only in Central and South America. They are commonly called eyemarks, alluding to the eyespot on the wings.
