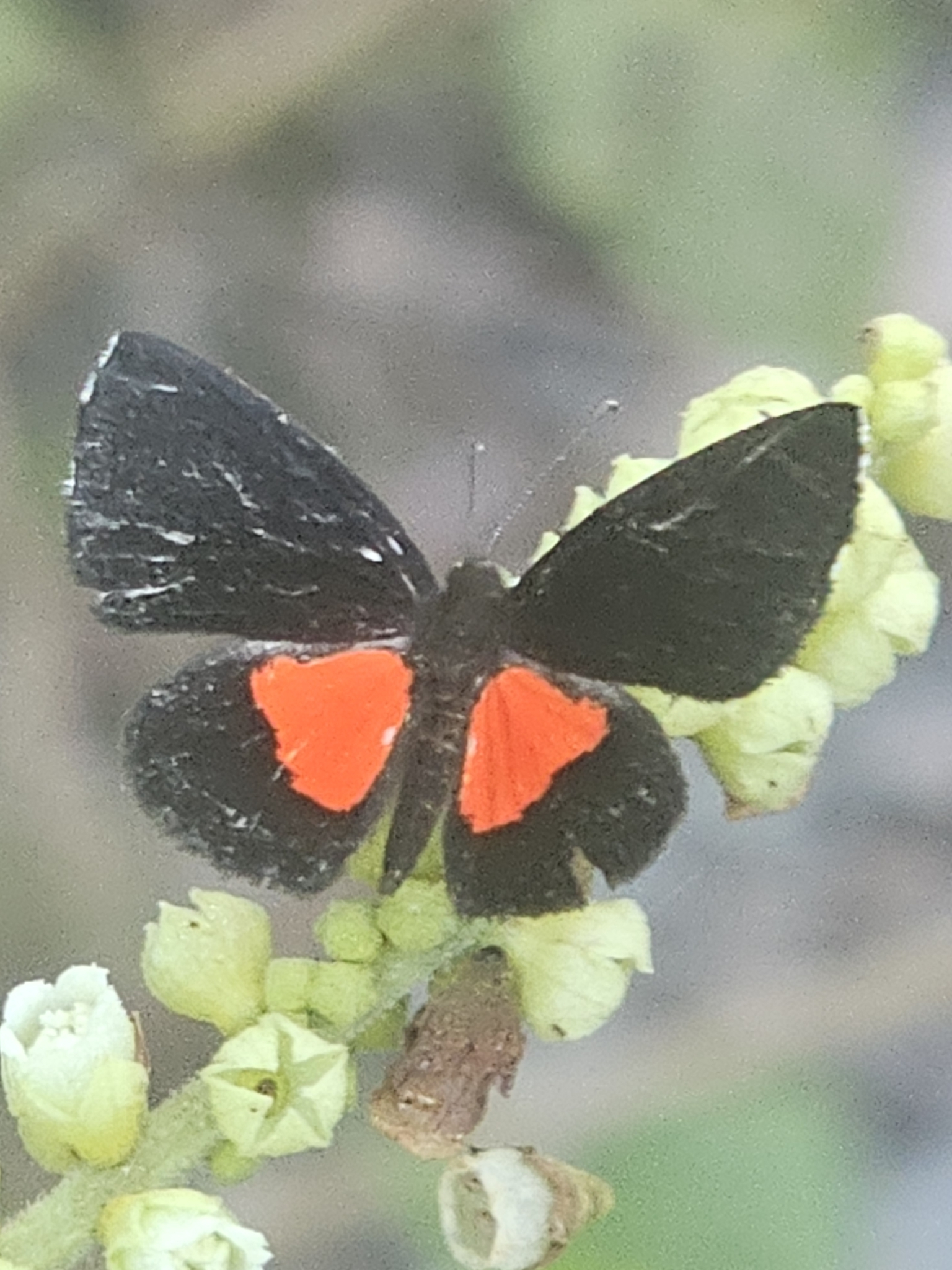

Scientific classification
- Kingdom: Animalia
- Phylum: Arthropoda
- Class: Insecta
- Order: Lepidoptera
- Family: Riodinidae
- Genus: Phaenochitonia
- Species: P. cingulus

Binomial name
- Phaenochitonia cingulus (Stoll, 1790)

= Phaenochitonia cingulus =

Species of insect

Phaenochitonia cingulus is a species from the genus Phaenochitonia. The species was originally described by Caspar Stoll in 1790.

== Introduction ==
Phaenochitonia cingulus is a butterfly species first described from a specimen collected in Suriname. Its antennae are black and white ringed, with a brown body and head. The forewings are dark brown with a broad, curved red band, while the hindwings feature a narrower red band of the same color. The eyes are brown and positioned near the body.

== Taxonomy ==
Phaenochitonia cingulus is a species of butterfly in the family Hesperiidae. It was first described in 1790 by Caspar Stoll under the original name or Basionym Papilio cingulus. This species has since been reclassified under the genus Phaenochitonia, reflecting updates in taxonomic understanding.

== Distribution ==
Official recordings are sparse. The species was first collected and described in 1791 in Suriname. Observations in Citizen science initiative suggest a distribution in The Guianas and the Amazon basin.
