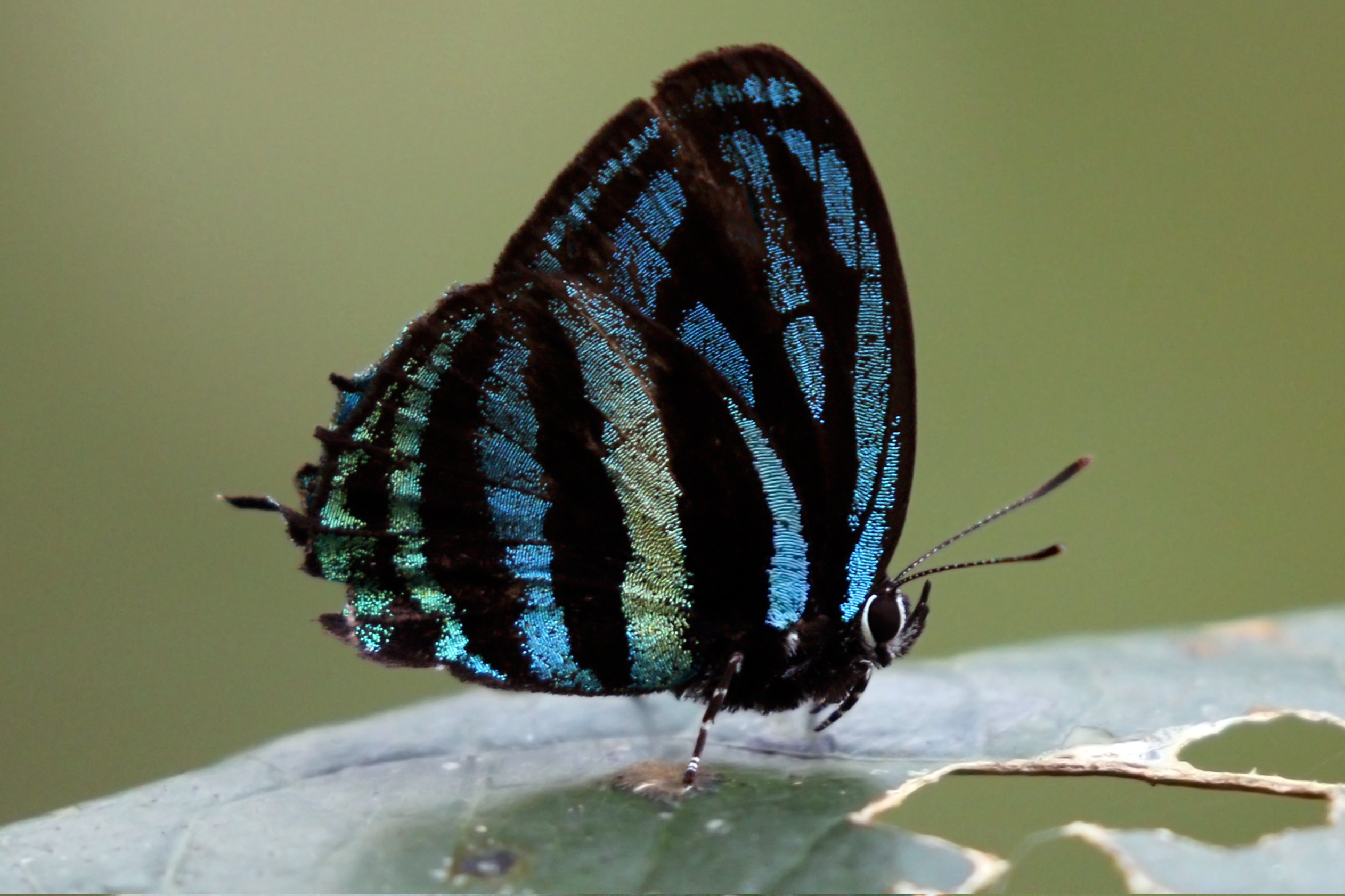
- Male T. selina at the Cristalino River; Southern Amazon, Brazil

Scientific classification
- Domain: Eukaryota
- Kingdom: Animalia
- Phylum: Arthropoda
- Class: Insecta
- Order: Lepidoptera
- Family: Lycaenidae
- Subfamily: Theclinae
- Tribe: Eumaeini
- Genus: Thestius; Hübner, 1819

= Thestius (butterfly) =

Butterfly genus in family Lycaenidae

Thestius is a genus of hairstreak butterflies in the family Lycaenidae. The species of this genus are found in the Neotropical realm.

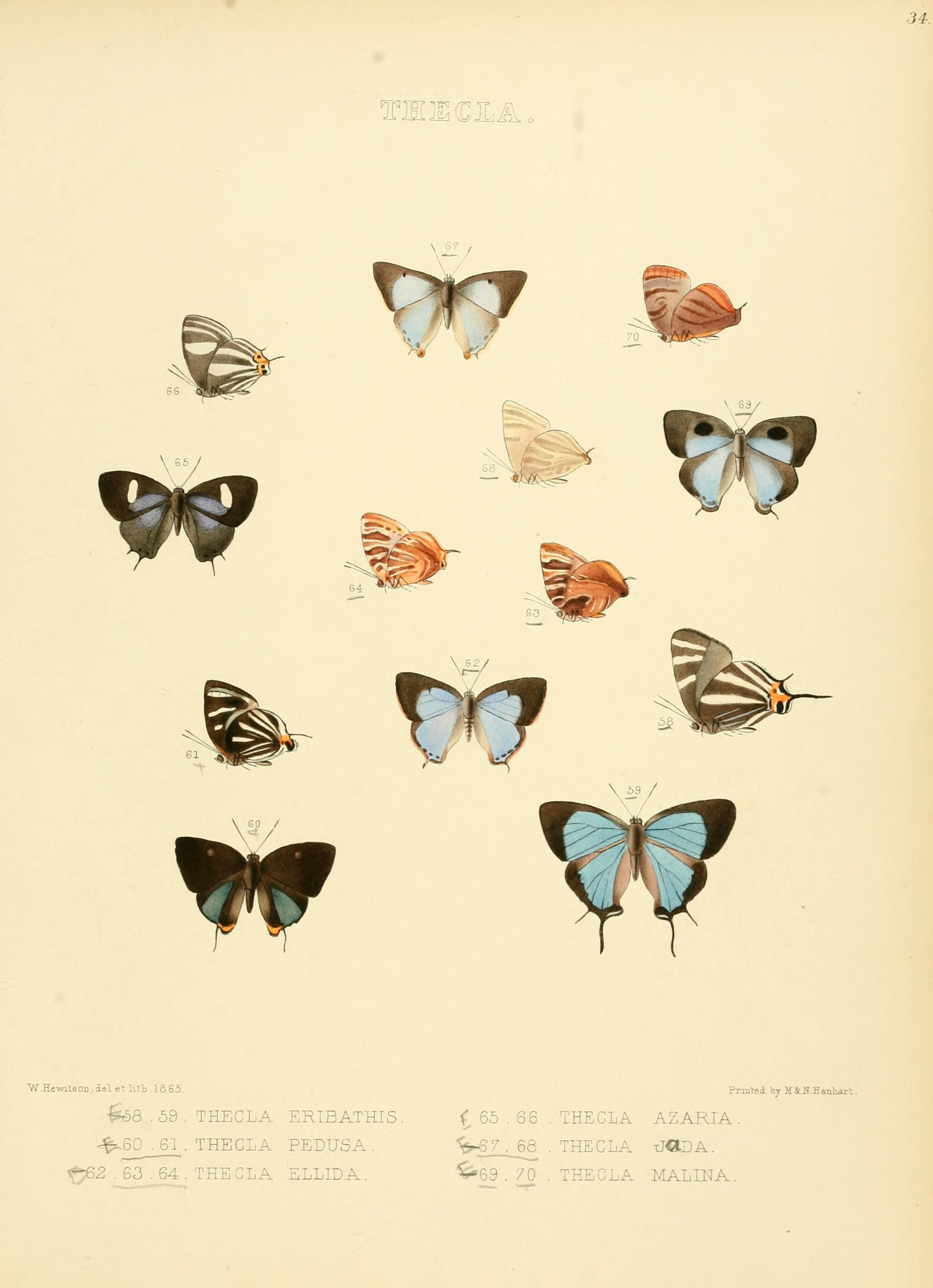
T. azaria, figures 65 and 66

== Species ==
- Thestius pholeus (Cramer, [1777])
- Thestius selina (Hewitson, 1869)
- Thestius meridionalis (Draudt, 1870)
- Thestius epopea (Hewitson, 1870)
- Thestius azaria (Hewitson, 1867)
- Thestius lycabas (Cramer, [1777])
