= Praefaunula =

Scientific classification
- Kingdom: Animalia
- Phylum: Arthropoda
- Class: Insecta
- Order: Lepidoptera
- Family: Nymphalidae
- Subtribe: Euptychiina
- Genus: Praefaunula; Forster, 1964

Genus of butterflies

Praefaunula is a genus of satyrid butterflies found in the Neotropical realm.

== Species ==
Listed alphabetically:

- Praefaunula armilla (Butler, 1867)
- Praefaunula liturata (Butler, 1867)
- Praefaunula vesper (Butler, 1867)
