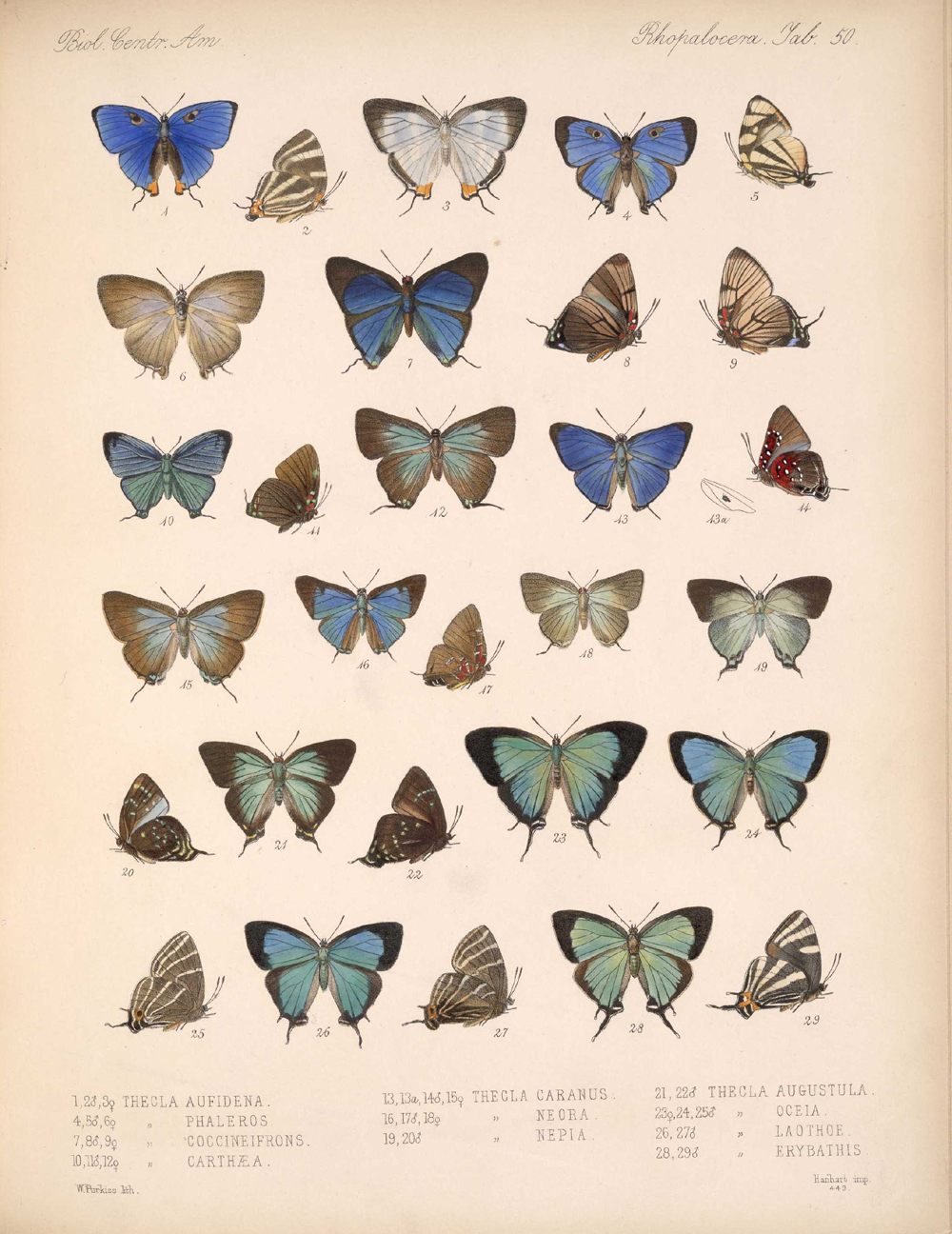
- Laothus and related genera.

Scientific classification
- Domain: Eukaryota
- Kingdom: Animalia
- Phylum: Arthropoda
- Class: Insecta
- Order: Lepidoptera
- Family: Lycaenidae
- Tribe: Eumaeini
- Genus: Laothus; Johnson, Kruse & Kroenlein, 1997

Synonyms
- Gibbossa Salazar, 2001; Gibbonota Salazar & López, 1996 (preoccupied by Gibbonota Heinrich, 1937)

= Laothus =

Butterfly genus in family Lycaenidae

Laothus is a genus of butterflies in the family Lycaenidae. The members of this genus are found in the Neotropical realm.

== Species ==
The following eight species may be recognized:

- Laothus gibberosa (Hewitson, 1867)
- Laothus numen (Druce, 1907)
- Laothus phydela (Hewitson, 1867)
- Laothus erybathis (Hewitson, 1867)
- Laothus oceia (Godman & Salvin, [1887])
- Laothus viridicans (C. & R. Felder, 1865)
- Laothus barajo (Reakirt, [1867])
- Laothus cockaynei (Goodson, 1945)
