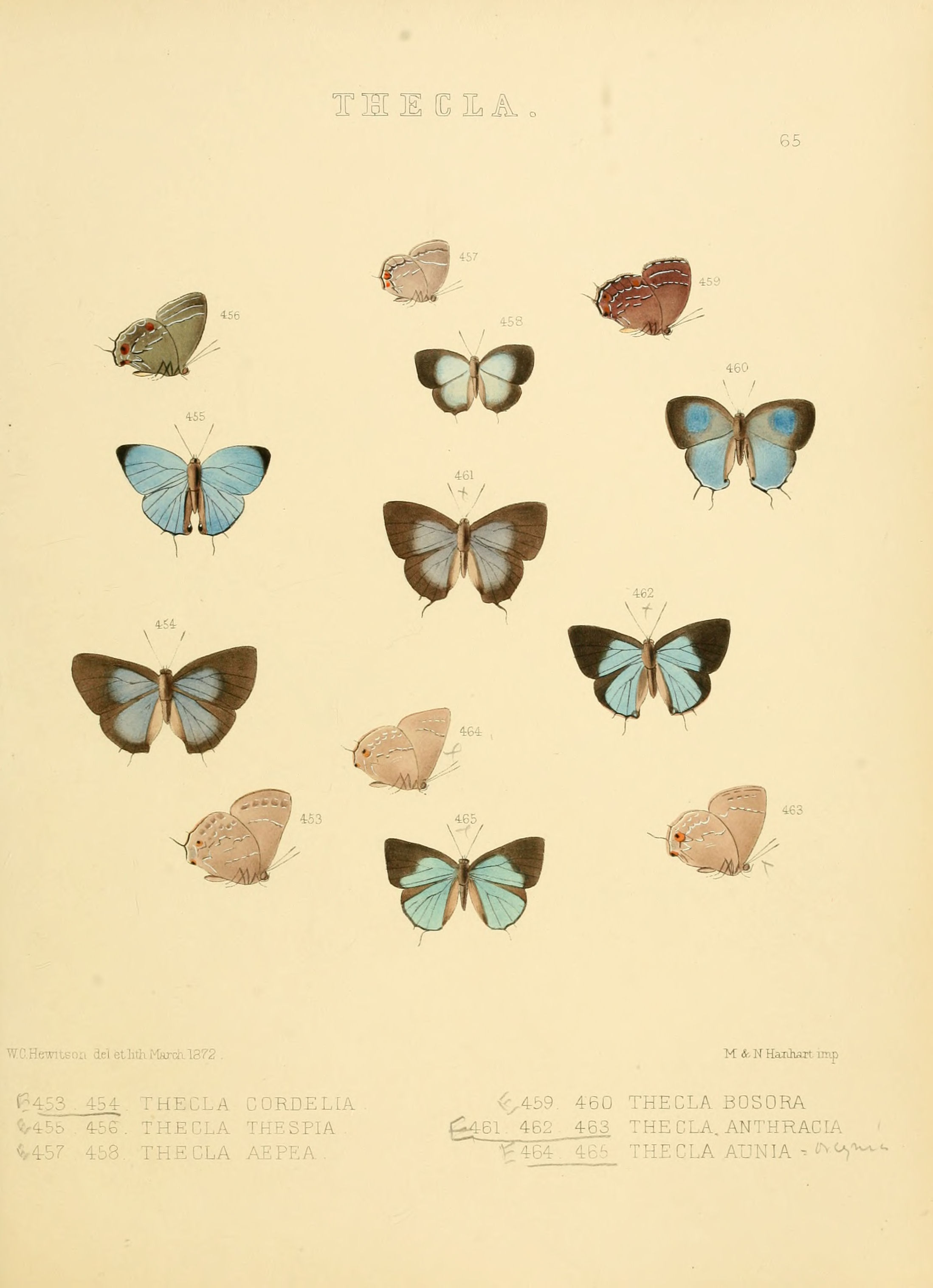
- Busbiina bosora depicted in William Chapman Hewitson's Illustrations of diurnal Lepidoptera

Scientific classification
- Kingdom: Animalia
- Phylum: Arthropoda
- Class: Insecta
- Order: Lepidoptera
- Family: Lycaenidae
- Subfamily: Theclinae
- Tribe: Eumaeini
- Genus: Busbiina; Robbins, 2004
- Species: B. bosora

Binomial name
- Busbiina bosora (Hewitson, 1870)

= Busbiina =

Monotypic butterfly genus in family Lycaenidae

Busbiina is a genus of Neotropical butterfly in the family Lycaenidae. Its sole species, Busbiina bosora, is known from Ecuador.
