= Narope sutor =

Scientific classification
- Kingdom: Animalia
- Phylum: Arthropoda
- Class: Insecta
- Order: Lepidoptera
- Family: Nymphalidae
- Genus: Narope
- Species: N. sutor

Binomial name
- Narope sutor Stichel, 1916

Synonyms
- Aponarope sutor (Stichel, 1916)

Species of butterfly

Narope sutor is a Neotropical species of butterfly of the family Nymphalidae described by Hans Julius Stichel in 1916. It is endemic to Brazil.

== Description ==
Narope sutor is partially characterised by the underside forewing.A narrow, whitish band at M3 distally uncertainly defined, runs close along the darker brown distal edge; in the front distal part, 4 dark spots are placed uncertainly, a lighter streak runs diagonally from the apex to the middle of the hind margin.

== Taxonomy ==
Aponarope sutor Casagrande, 1982 Revta bras. Ent. 26 (3/4): 356; TS: Narope sutor Stichel Narope Matos-Maravi, Wahlberg, Freitas, DeVries, Antonelli & Penz, 2021, Biol. J. Linn. Soc.
