= Caenoptychia =

Scientific classification
- Kingdom: Animalia
- Phylum: Arthropoda
- Class: Insecta
- Order: Lepidoptera
- Family: Nymphalidae
- Tribe: Satyrini
- Subtribe: Euptychiina
- Genus: Caenoptychia; Le Cerf, 1919
- Species: C. boulleti

Binomial name
- Caenoptychia boulleti Le Cerf, 1919

Synonyms
- Coenoptychia; Euptychia virgata Joicey & Talbot, 1924; Ristia tigrina Gagarin, 1936

Genus of butterflies

Caenoptychia is a monotypic, Neotropic, genus of satyrid butterflies. Its sole species, Caenoptychia boulleti, is found in south-eastern Brazil.
