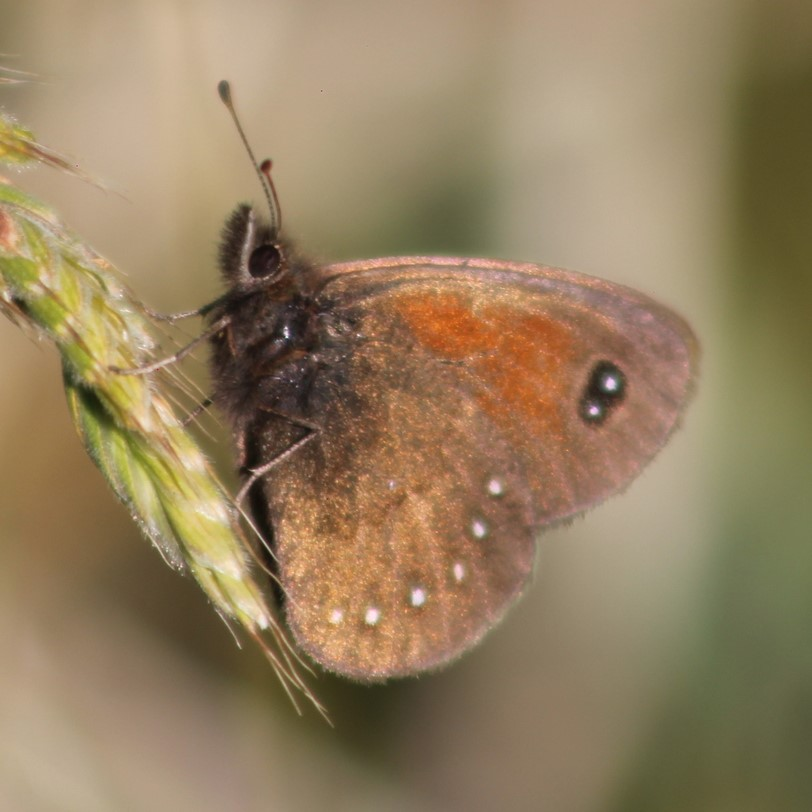
- Faunula stelligera

Scientific classification
- Kingdom: Animalia
- Phylum: Arthropoda
- Clade: Pancrustacea
- Class: Insecta
- Order: Lepidoptera
- Family: Nymphalidae
- Subfamily: Satyrinae
- Genus: Faunula; C. & R. Felder, 1867

= Faunula =

Genus of brush-footed butterflies

Faunula is a genus of Neotropical butterflies in the nymphalid subfamily Satyrinae.

== Species ==
- Faunula dubii Pyrcz, 2012
- Faunula eleates (Weymer, 1890)
- Faunula euripides (Weymer, 1890)
- Faunula leucoglene C. & R. Felder, [1867]
- Faunula patagonica (Mabille, 1885)
- Faunula stelligera Butler, 1881
