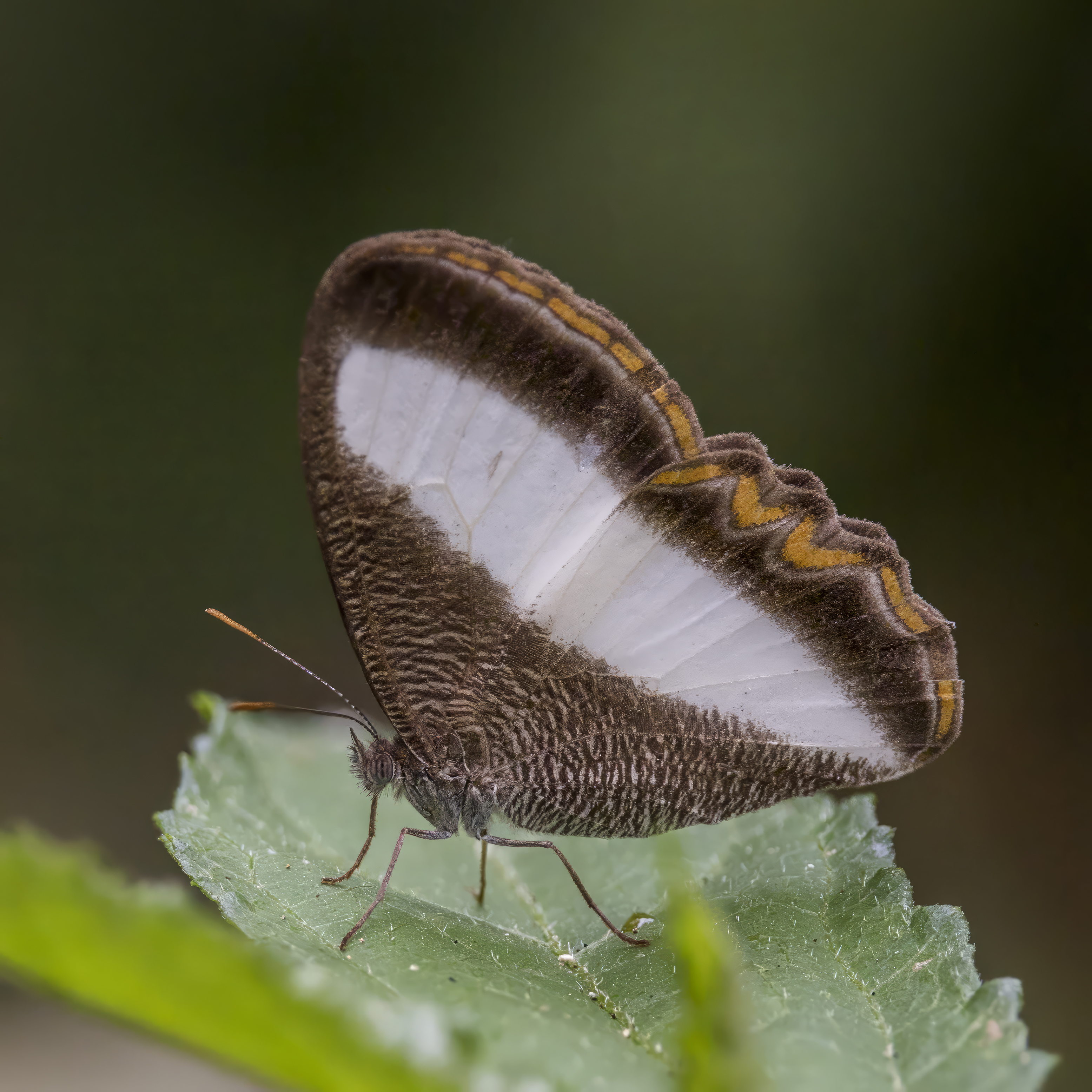
- O. typhla in Colombia

Scientific classification
- Domain: Eukaryota
- Kingdom: Animalia
- Phylum: Arthropoda
- Class: Insecta
- Order: Lepidoptera
- Family: Nymphalidae
- Subtribe: Euptychiina
- Genus: Oressinoma; Doubleday, [1849]

Synonyms
- Ocalis Westwood, [1851]; Ocalis Boisduval, 1870

= Oressinoma =

Genus of brush-footed butterflies

Oressinoma is a Neotropical genus of butterflies in the family Nymphalidae.

== Species ==
- Oressinoma sorata Godman & Salvin, 1868
- Oressinoma typhla Doubleday, [1849]
