= Taygetomorpha =

Scientific classification
- Kingdom: Animalia
- Phylum: Arthropoda
- Class: Insecta
- Order: Lepidoptera
- Family: Nymphalidae
- Subtribe: Euptychiina
- Genus: Taygetomorpha; Miller, 2004

Genus of butterflies

Taygetomorpha is a genus of satyrid butterflies found in the Neotropical realm.

== Species ==
Listed alphabetically:

- Taygetomorpha celia (Cramer, [1779])
- Taygetomorpha puritana (Weeks, 1902)
