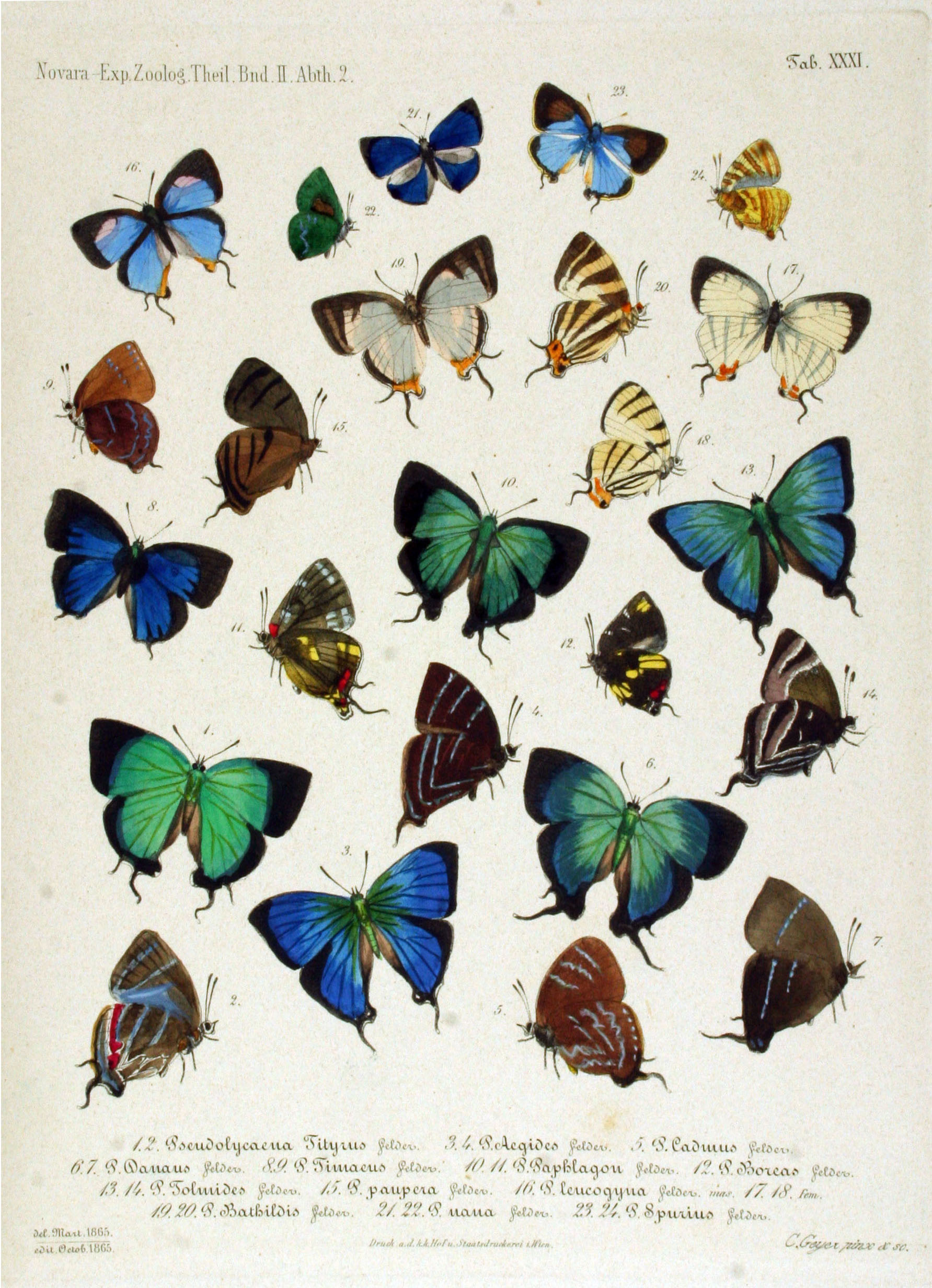
- Micandra aegides (C. & R. Felder, 1865) Figs. 3, 4 Reise Fregatte Novara

Scientific classification
- Domain: Eukaryota
- Kingdom: Animalia
- Phylum: Arthropoda
- Class: Insecta
- Order: Lepidoptera
- Family: Lycaenidae
- Tribe: Eumaeini
- Genus: Micandra; Schatz, 1888

Synonyms
- "Egides" Salazar, 1995 (nomen nudum); Egides K.Johnson, Kruse & Kroenlein, 1997

= Micandra =

Butterfly genus in family Lycaenidae

Micandra is a genus of butterflies in the family Lycaenidae.

The members (species) of this genus are found in the Neotropical realm.

== Species ==
- M. aegides (Felder & Felder, 1865)
- M. comae (Druce, 1907)
- M. cyda (Godman & Salvin, 1887)
- M. dignota (Draudt, 1921)
- M. ion (Druce, 1890)
- M. platyptera (Felder & Felder, 1865)
- M. sylvana (Lathy, 1936)
