= Cercyeuptychia =

Scientific classification
- Kingdom: Animalia
- Phylum: Arthropoda
- Class: Insecta
- Order: Lepidoptera
- Family: Nymphalidae
- Tribe: Satyrini
- Subtribe: Euptychiina
- Genus: Cercyeuptychia; Miller & Emmel, 1971
- Species: C. luederwaldti

Binomial name
- Cercyeuptychia luederwaldti (Spitz, 1931)

Synonyms
- Cercyonis luederwaldti Spitz, 1931

Genus of butterflies

Cercyeuptychia is a monotypic genus of Neotropic satyrid butterfly. Its sole species, Cercyeuptychia luederwaldti, is found in Brazil.
