= Chimastrum =

- Chimastrum argentea in Seitz (128b)

Scientific classification
- Kingdom: Animalia
- Phylum: Arthropoda
- Clade: Pancrustacea
- Class: Insecta
- Order: Lepidoptera
- Family: Riodinidae
- Subfamily: Riodininae
- Genus: Chimastrum; Godman and Salvin, [1886]

Species
- See text

Genus of butterflies

Chimastrum is a butterfly genus in the family Riodinidae. They are resident in the Neotropics.

== Species list ==
- Chimastrum argentea (Bates, 1866) Mexico, Panama, Colombia.
- Chimastrum celina (Bates, 1868) Brazil.

== Sources ==
- Chimastrum
