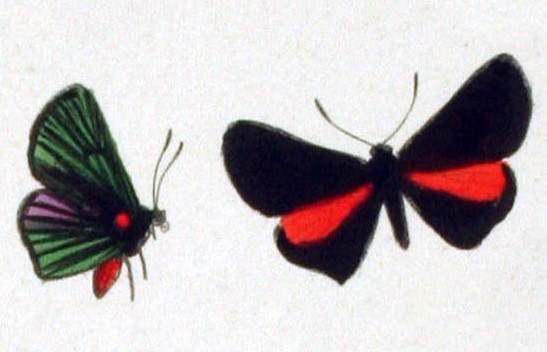
- Xenandra heliodes

Scientific classification
- Kingdom: Animalia
- Phylum: Arthropoda
- Class: Insecta
- Order: Lepidoptera
- Family: Riodinidae
- Subfamily: Riodininae
- Genus: Xenandra; C. & R. Felder, [1865]

Synonyms
- Andara Capronnier, 1874; Westwoodia Houlbert, 1918 (preocc. Brullé, 1846); Uestiudia Oiticica, 1955

= Xenandra =

Genus of butterflies

Xenandra is a genus in the butterfly family Riodinidae present in the Neotropical realm.

== Species ==
- Xenandra agria (Hewitson, [1853]) present in Brazil
- Xenandra ahrenholzi Hall & Willmott 2007 present in Ecuador
- Xenandra desora Schaus, 1928 present in Costa Rica, Panama and Colombia
- Xenandra heliodes C. & R. Felder, [1865] present in Brazil and Venezuela
- Xenandra helius (Cramer, 1779) present in Costa Rica, Guyana and Peru
- Xenandra mielkei Hall & Furtado, 1999 present in Brazil
- Xenandra nigrivenata Schaus, 1913 present in Costa Rica
- Xenandra pelopia (Druce, 1890) present in Colombia
- Xenandra poliotactis (Stichel, 1910) present in Peru
- Xenandra vulcanalis Stichel, 1910 present in Colombia

== Sources ==
- Xenandra at Markku Savela's website on Lepidoptera
- TOL
