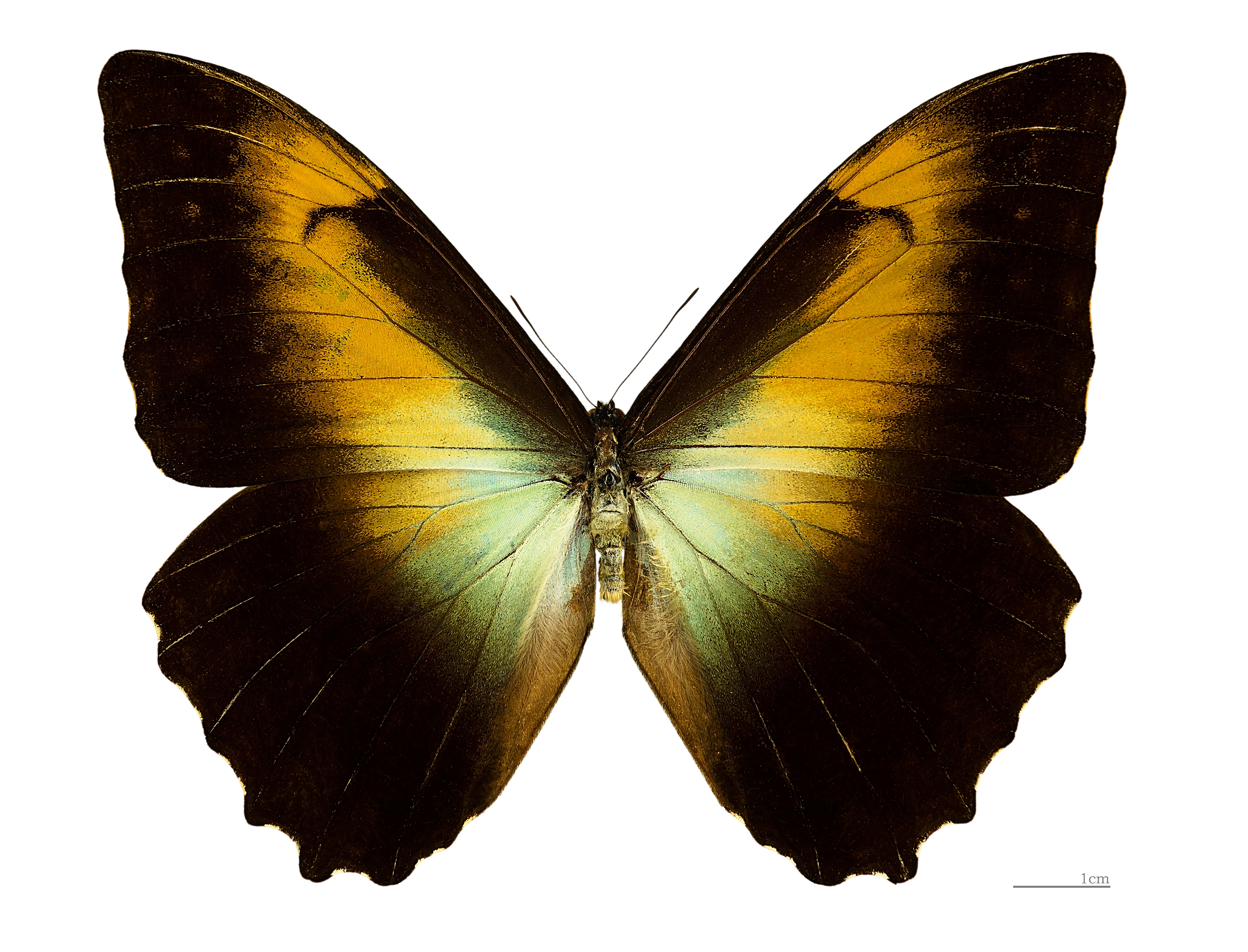
- Male upperside (Muséum de Toulouse)
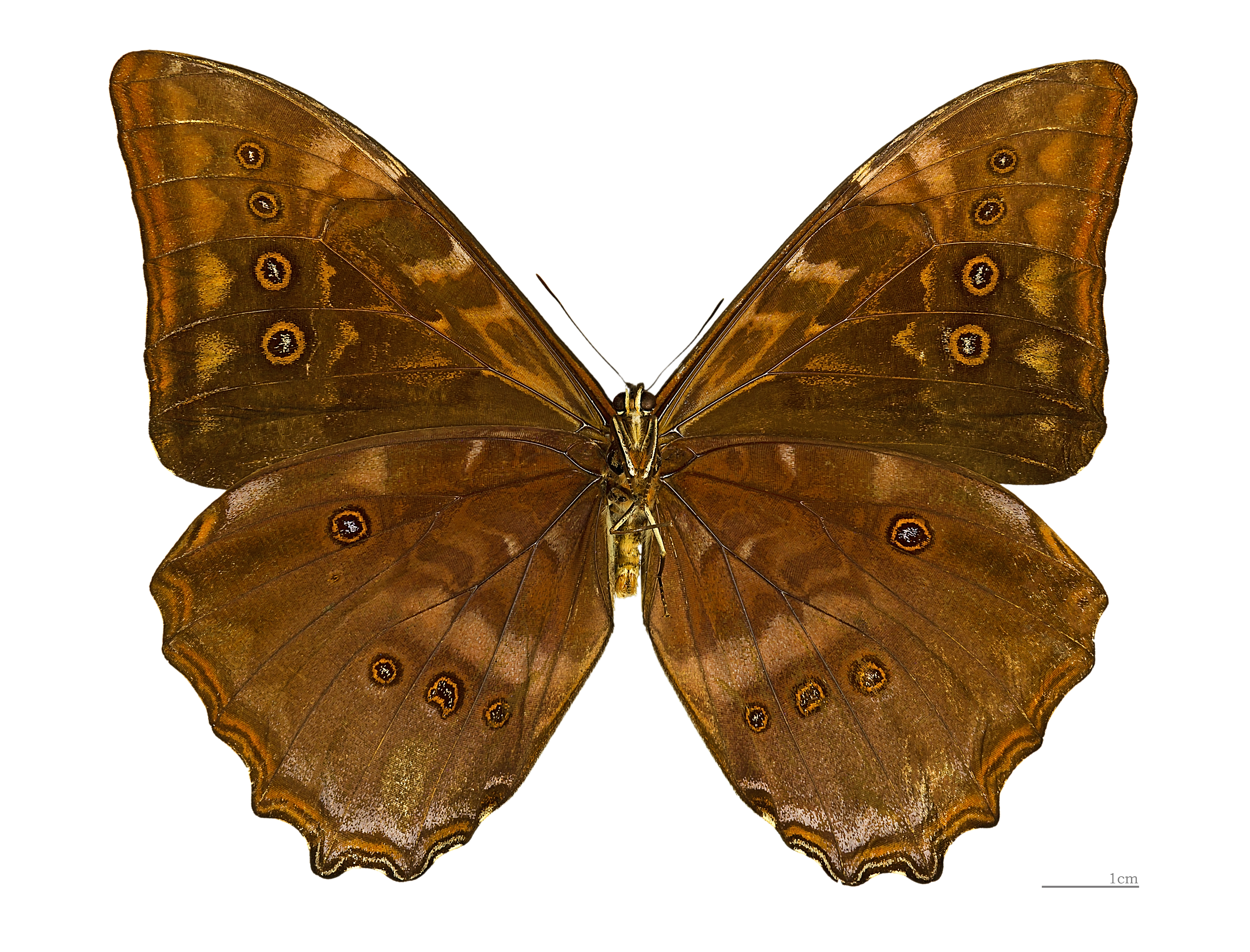
- Male underside (Muséum de Toulouse)

Scientific classification
- Kingdom: Animalia
- Phylum: Arthropoda
- Class: Insecta
- Order: Lepidoptera
- Family: Nymphalidae
- Genus: Morpho
- Species: M. telemachus

Binomial name
- Morpho telemachus (Linnaeus, 1758)

Synonyms
- Papilio telemachus Linnaeus, 1758; Papilio perseus Cramer, 1775 (preocc. Fabricius, 1775); Papilio metellus Cramer, 1779; Leonte telemache Hübner, [1819]; Morpho scipio C. & R. Felder, 1867; Morpho crameri Kirby, 1871; Morpho perseus demararae Kaye, 1919; Morpho perseus perseus ab. ebeninus Le Moult, 1926; Morpho perseus perseus ab. aureovirescens Le Moult, 1926; Morpho perseus perseus ab. marquei Le Moult, 1926; Morpho perseus ab. pseudohecuba Le Moult, 1926; Morpho perseus ab. semiperseus Le Moult, 1926; Morpho perseus ab. pumilus Le Moult, 1926; Morpho perseus perseus ab. subscipio Le Moult, 1926; Morpho perseus perseus ab. felderi Le Moult, 1926; Morpho (Iphimedeia) f. violetta Le Moult & Réal, 1962; Morpho (Iphimedeia) f. pseudocaius Le Moult & Réal, 1962; Morpho (Iphimedeia) f. viridiaurea Le Moult & Réal, 1962; Morpho perseus foucheri Le Moult, 1926; Morpho perseus foucheri ab. supperseus Le Moult, 1926; Morpho perseus foucheri ab. fuscus Le Moult, 1926; Morpho perseus foucheri ab. decellei Le Moult, 1926; Morpho perseus foucheri ab. bilineatus Le Moult, 1926; Morpho perseus foucheri ab. impunctatus Le Moult, 1926; Morpho iphiclus f. martini Niepelt, 1933; Morpho perseus caius Rousseau-Decelle, 1935; Morpho caïus f. tibérius Rousseau-Decelle, 1935; Morpho perseus margareta Weber, 1944; Morpho perseus mutius Weber, 1944; Morpho perseus obscura Viette, 1960; Morpho (Iphimedeia) telemachus straeleni Le Moult & Réal, 1962; Morpho (Iphimedeia) telemachus exsusarion Le Moult & Réal, 1962; Morpho (Iphimedeia) telemachus foucheri f. ochropterus Le Moult & Réal, 1962; Morpho (Iphimedeia) f. iphimutius Le Moult & Réal, 1962; Morpho (Iphimedeia) telemachus caius f. emortua Le Moult & Réal, 1962; Morpho (Iphimedeia) telemachus foucheri f. bicolor Le Moult & Réal, 1962; Morpho (Iphimedeia) telemachus foucheri f. iphiclina Le Moult & Réal, 1962; Morpho (Iphimedeia) telemachus martini f. tricolor Le Moult & Réal, 1962; Morpho (Iphimedeia) telemachus martini f. coeruleoviridis Le Moult & Réal, 1962; Morpho perseus sulla Weber, 1963; Morpho penelope Weber, 1962; Morpho telemachus martini f. equatorius Blandin & Jeannot, 1977; Morpho perseus lilianae ab. pseudotheseus Le Moult, 1927; Morpho perseus lilianae f. horracki Rousseau-Decelle, 1936; Morpho (Iphimedeia) f. fauveli Le Moult & Réal, 1962; Morpho (Iphimedeia) f. dives Le Moult & Réal, 1962; Morpho (Iphimedeia) f. hypogyna Le Moult & Réal, 1962; Morpho (Iphimedeia) telemachus issalisi Le Moult & Réal, 1963

= Morpho telemachus =

Species of butterfly

Morpho telemachus is a Neotropical butterfly.

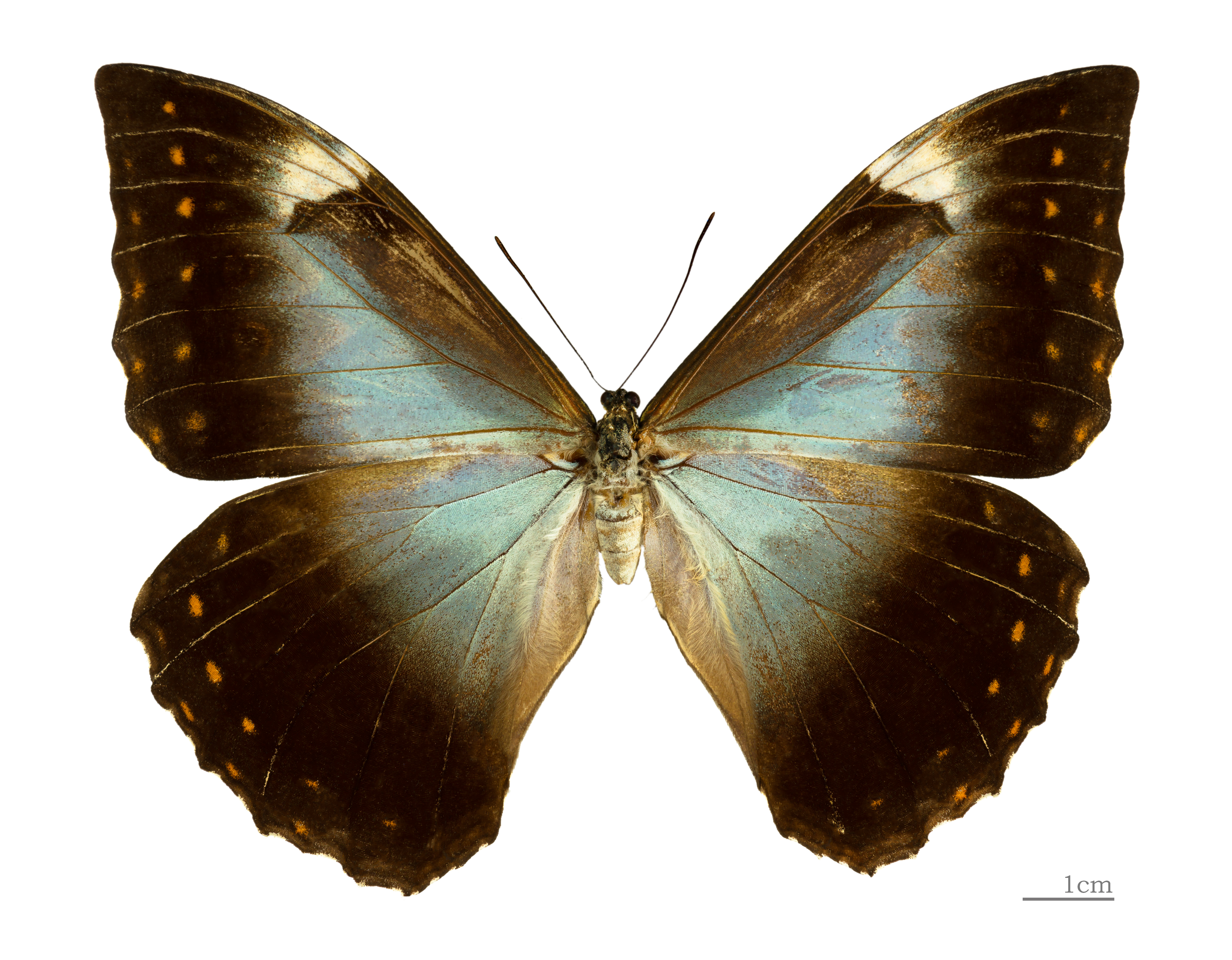
Female

== Description ==
Morpho telemachus is a large butterfly. The upperside of the forewings is a silver grey and blue green with a very wide black-brown outer edge. This is also on the posterior wings and can even cover almost all of the hindwings and forewings. There is a black band on half of the costal edge from the base.

The underside is copper brown with a line of black white and orange ocelli black white and orange, in an arc on both the hindwings and forewings.

== Subspecies ==
- M. t. telemachus Suriname, Guyana, French Guiana, Venezuela
- M. t. iphiclus C. & R. Felder, 1862 Ecuador, Colombia, Peru, Bolivia, Brazil (Amazonas, Pará)
- M. t. lilianae Le Moult, 1927 Venezuela
- M. t. ssp. Ebert, MS Brazil (Pernambuco)

== Behaviour ==
In 1913, Hans Fruhstorfer wrote: "According to Michael perseus [synonym for telemachus] is never seen fluttering round flowers, nor do the butterflies seem to require food or drink. They prefer rather to soar through the spaces of the illimitable forests like Morpho hecaba or to float along in unrestricted flight over the tops of the trees in a deep valley. According to Hahnel perseus is one of the highest-flying Morphids and on account of its brown under surface, which looks very dark against the light sky, it gives the impression, when flying at a height of 8-10 m, of a black coloured species. Hahnel says that the butterflies, which in spite of their lively, jerky movement through the air scarcely flap the wings appreciably, present a charming spectacle, particularly when half a dozen or more meet and engage in a sham fight. Almost the whole morning such scenes are repeated, for only towards midday, after they have been flying over their wide domain for 2 or 3 hours, do their pinions become weary and they settle again in the shade of the branches on some large leaf, the back turned towards the dark and the eyes towards the open. One rarely finds even a single insect flying in the afternoon and then probably only when unfavourable weather has hindered its doing so in the morning. The butterflies occasionally dart down on to yellow Papilio females drinking on the ground, undoubtedly taking them for their own females which are also frequently yellow, and Dr. Hahnel took advantage of this by fastening pieces of yellow paper in his net, which actually deceived the perseus males."

== Related Species (Species Group) ==
- Morpho theseus

== Etymology ==
The species is named in the classical tradition for Telemachus, a figure in Greek mythology, the son of Odysseus and Penelope, and a central character in Homer's Odyssey.
