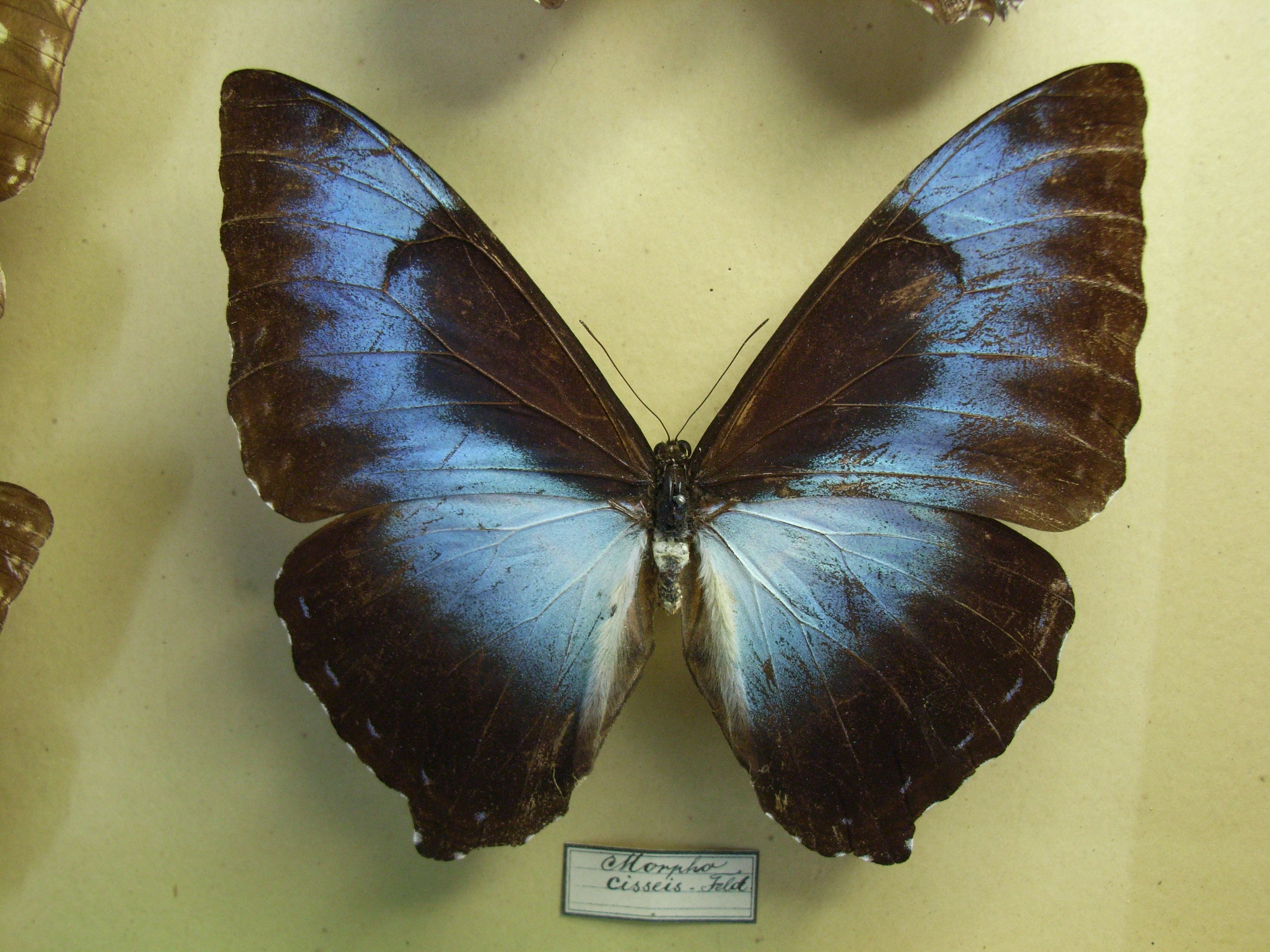
- Specimen from Mato Grosso, Brazil

Scientific classification
- Kingdom: Animalia
- Phylum: Arthropoda
- Class: Insecta
- Order: Lepidoptera
- Family: Nymphalidae
- Genus: Morpho
- Species: M. cisseis

Binomial name
- Morpho cisseis (C. and R. Felder, 1860)

= Morpho cisseis =

Species of butterfly

Morpho cisseis, the Cisseis morpho, is a large Neotropical butterfly found in the southern and western Amazon in Bolivia, Colombia, Peru, Ecuador, and Brazil. It includes several subspecies, but has itself sometimes been treated as a subspecies of the sunset morpho. Both are highly valued by collectors.

== Description ==
Morpho cisseis is a large butterfly with a wingspan of 147 mm and 180 mm. The upperside is blue-green gray, the outer edge is largely bordered by black and broad black band extending over two-thirds of the forewing's costal edge. The reverse is copper decorated with a line of white chevrons and black, yellow and white eyespots, three on the forewings and a very large and three more small eyespots on the hindwings.

Account in Die Gross-Schmetterlinge der Erde

cisseis Fldr. (= egyptus Deyr.), from the south side of the Lower Amazon, is distinguished in the male by dark, in the female by lighter blue and rather narrow bands on the forewing. On the hindwing the basal area is somewhat more extended than in hecuba and obidonus heracles, according to the sex lighter or darker blue, the blue with slight mother-of-pearl gloss and the submarginal area adorned with blue-white lunulate spots. At Itaituba on the Tapajos occur more commonly light blue, more rarely dark blue, or even dark violet females. In Ecuador and even in Bolivia the colour-scheme of cisseis is retained, yet in these countries the males, and occasionally also the females, sometimes assume a brownish colour.

— cisseides Fruhst. The black which occupies the cell of the forewing extends somewhat beyond its apex, and in addition the blue spot before the apex of the cell is obsolescent, being only indicated by a little dusting. Of cisseis Bates writes that the butterflies present a magnificent spectacle as they sail along by twos or threes at a great height in the still air of a tropical morning. But according to Dr. Hahnel cisseis only awakes when the high-flying perseus have already long been floating over the clearings, in the distance looking like black spots, when the sun has begun to beat down with full power on the leafy dome of the forest and M. menelaus has finished its flight, cisseis then moves slightly forward on the leaf on which it passed the night, and opening the wings it slips with a bound into the air, rising lightly to the tops of the trees, among which it takes its flight until the clearing of the road appears, which it now follows, pursuing its way quietly and steadily, with the powerful wings scarcely quivering. It looks then like a narrow silver-blue stripe, in the vestal purity of its delicate white colour, which from the middle towards the costal margin changes into a light blue, posteriorly into black. The silver-white and brown of the under surface, however, present an excellent copy of large withered leaves covered with mildew at the veins, the similarity indeed being so great when it is resting in the shade of the branches that at Villa Bella Dr. Hahnel once took a newly emerged example hanging on the pupa for such a withered leaf, until to his amazement he proved it to be a living form.

According to Michael (Iris 1894, p. 197) cisseis flies in every month, thus all the year round. — At Iquitos and Yurimaguas on the Upper Amazon cisseis-obidonus is replaced by phanodemus Hew., the forewing of which in rare cases still bears traces of the hecuba colouring and is in part somewhat brown-yellow with the marginal area only slightly blue. But examples with green-blue median band seem to be the commonest, this colour sometimes distally changing to olive-green or greenish brown and towards the base to light blue and white. In the female the shades of colour are less ill-defined and there occur pure and uniform light, dark, steel- and green-blue tinged specimens, to which it may be left to others to give special names. The under surface agrees completely with our figure 67 c, although it is only exceptionally that the apical ocelli of the hindwing are accompanied posteriorly by a small accessory eye-spot, as in the example from which the figure was drawn. Dr. Hahnel calls phanodemus a kingly form and compares it, in its quiet, peaceful and ghost-like flight, to the tutelary genius of the secret of the forest. Hahnel was only able to obtain phanodemus by erecting a sort of scaffolding of bamboos, which he set up to a height of about 5 m. in the line of flight of the Morphids. In order also to secure the phanodemuswhich came up from behind a mirror was fixed on the parapet of his tower, which indeed was not often successful, but when it was, gave all the greater satisfaction.

— polyidos subsp. nov. has a very broad black distal margin to the forewing, increasing in width from the costal margin to the anal angle, but the submarginal patches are only slightly indicated. The cell of the forewing contains only a few yellowish patches, the median band itself much narrowed. Hindwing basally pale yellow, distally lightly dusted with green.

== Taxonomy ==
- cisseis is the sister species of Morpho hecuba.

== Etymology ==
Cissei was the daughter of Cisseus, king of Thrace.

== Gallery ==
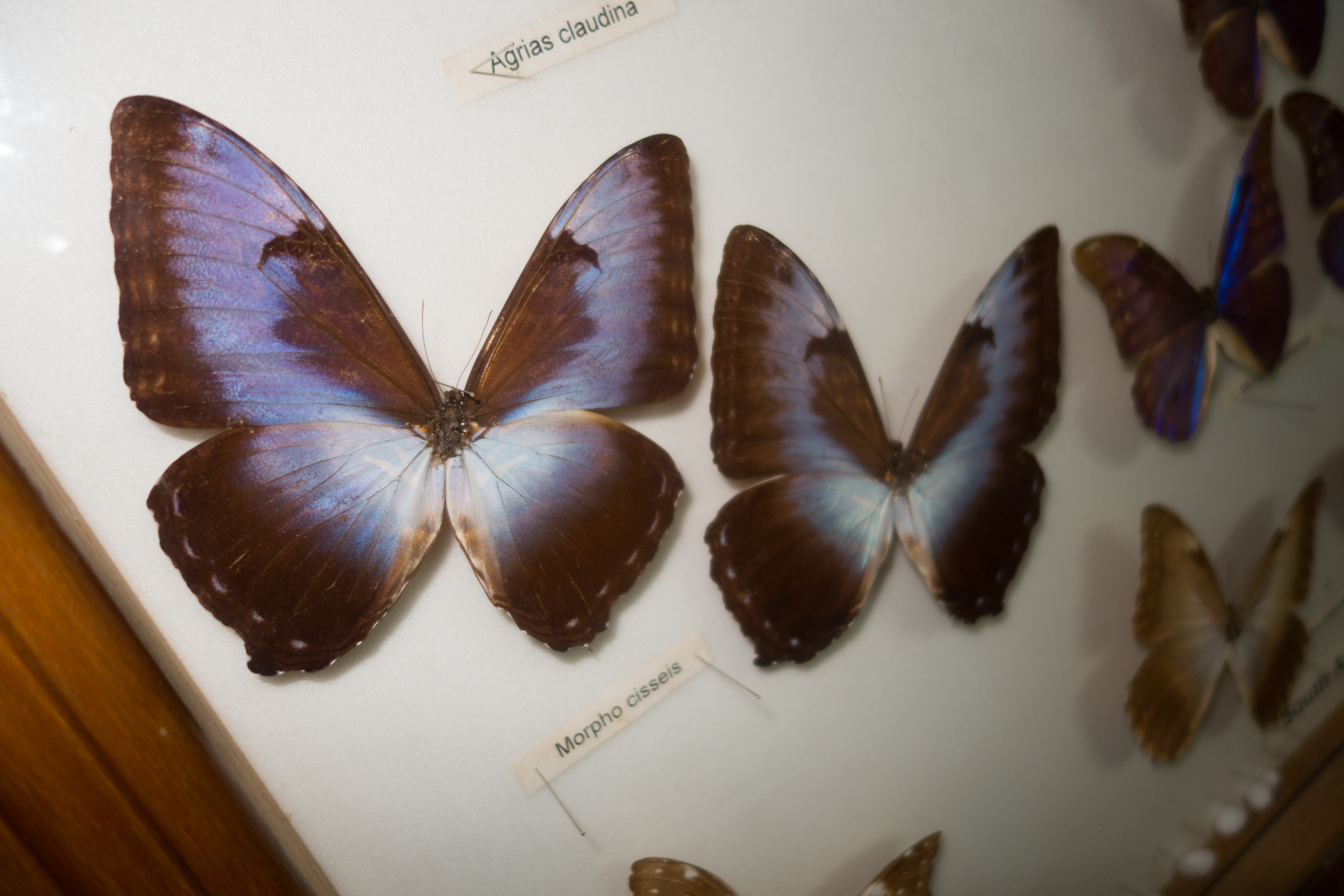
upperside

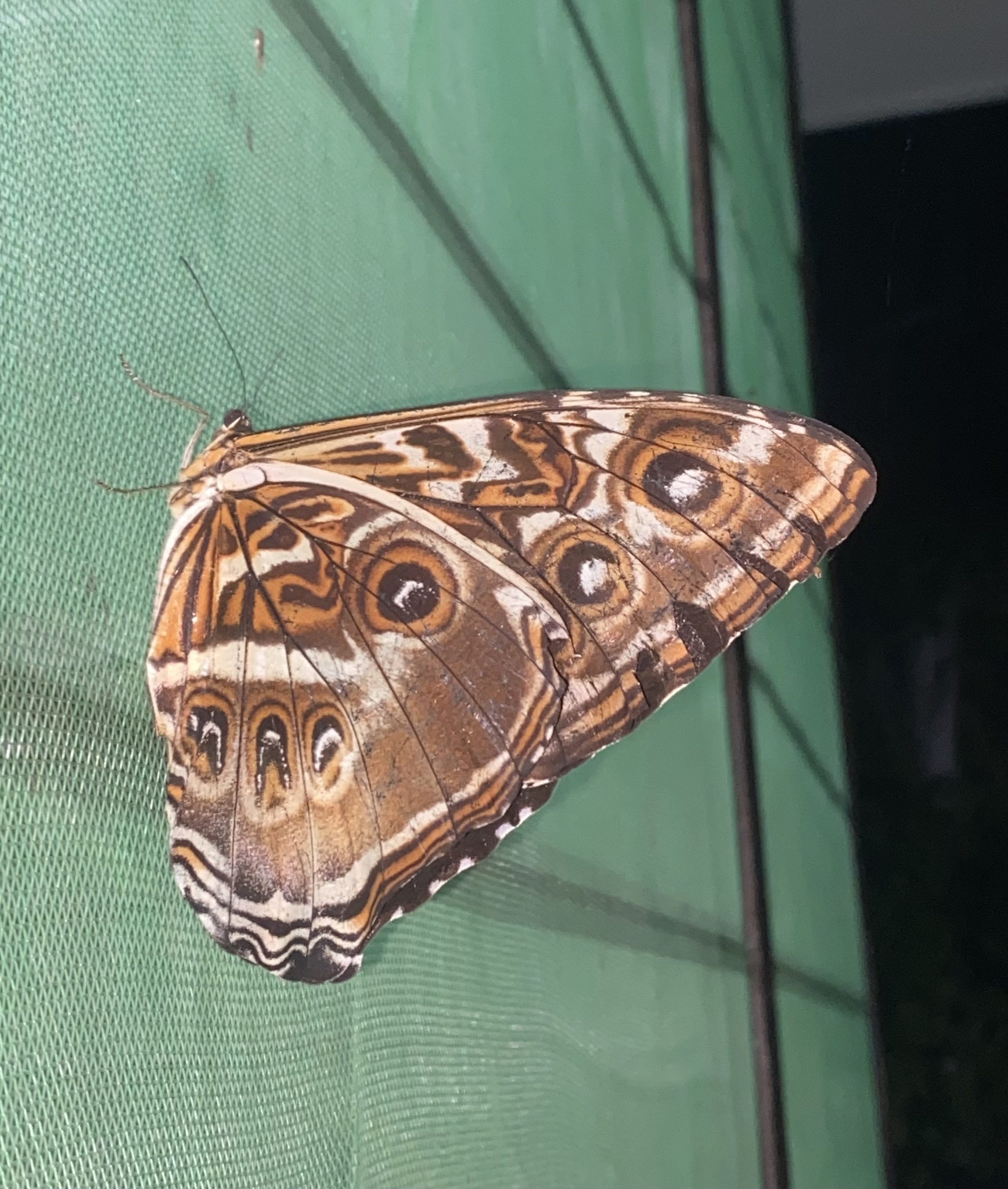
underside (vivo)

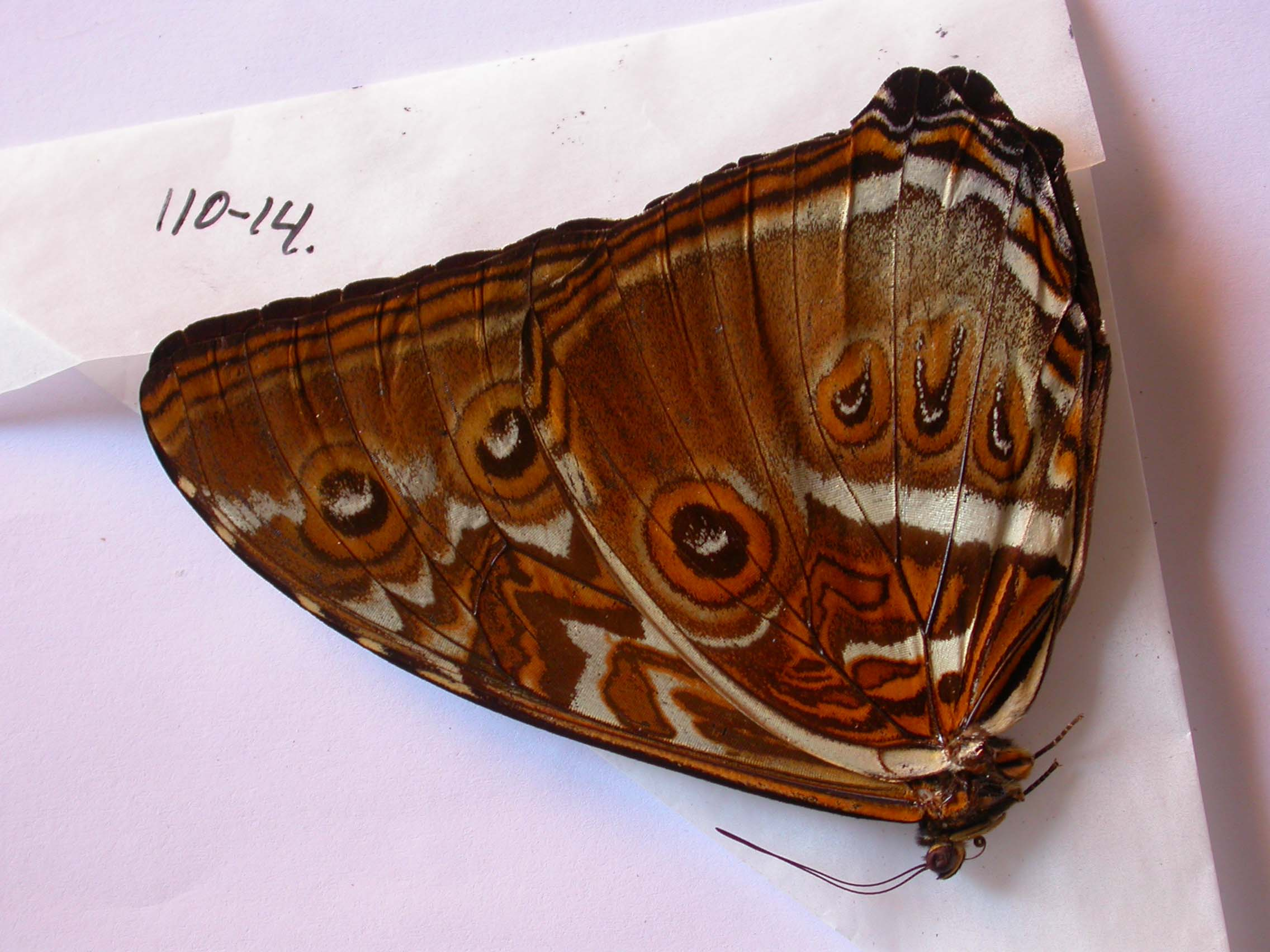
underside

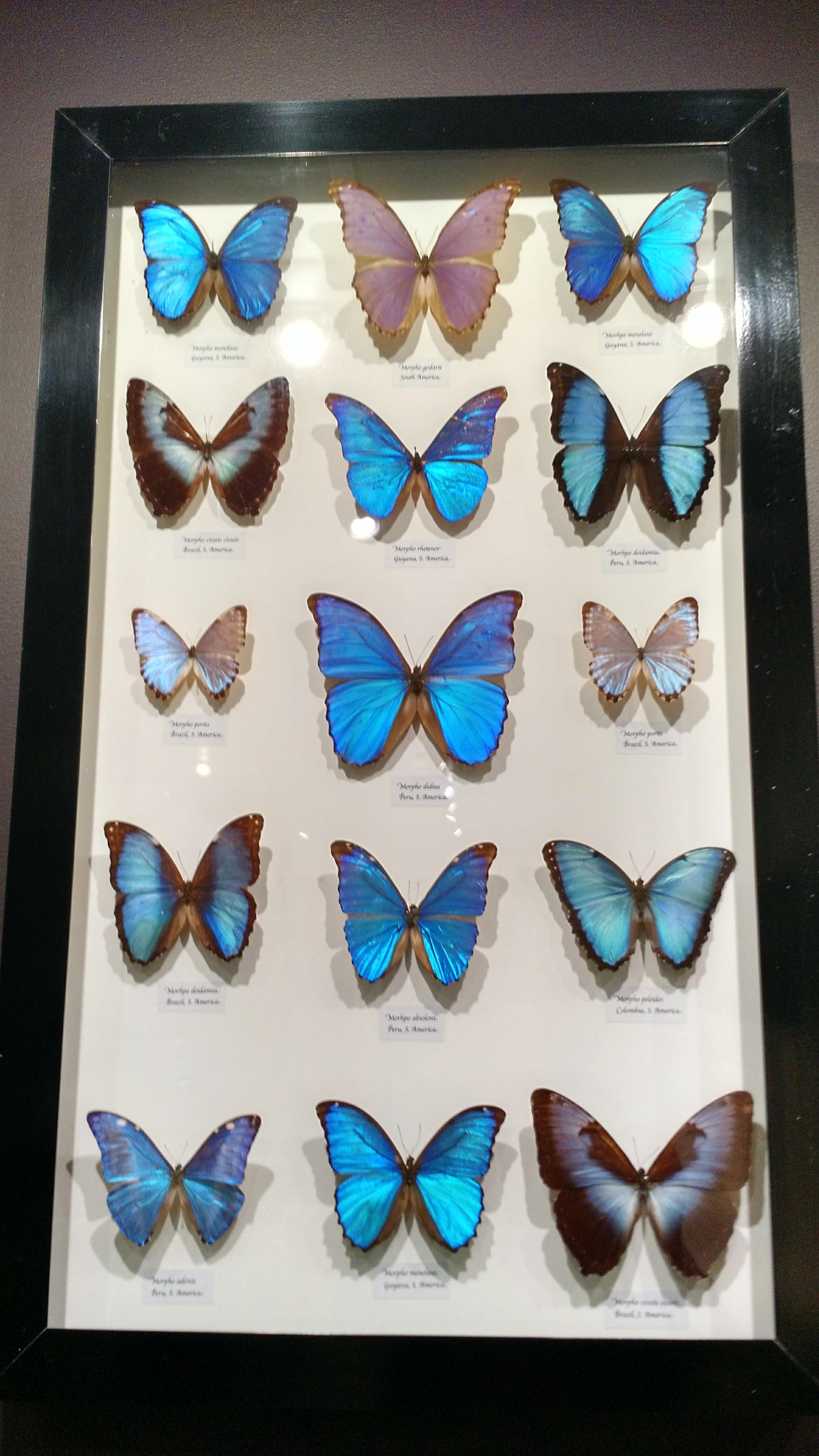
comparison
