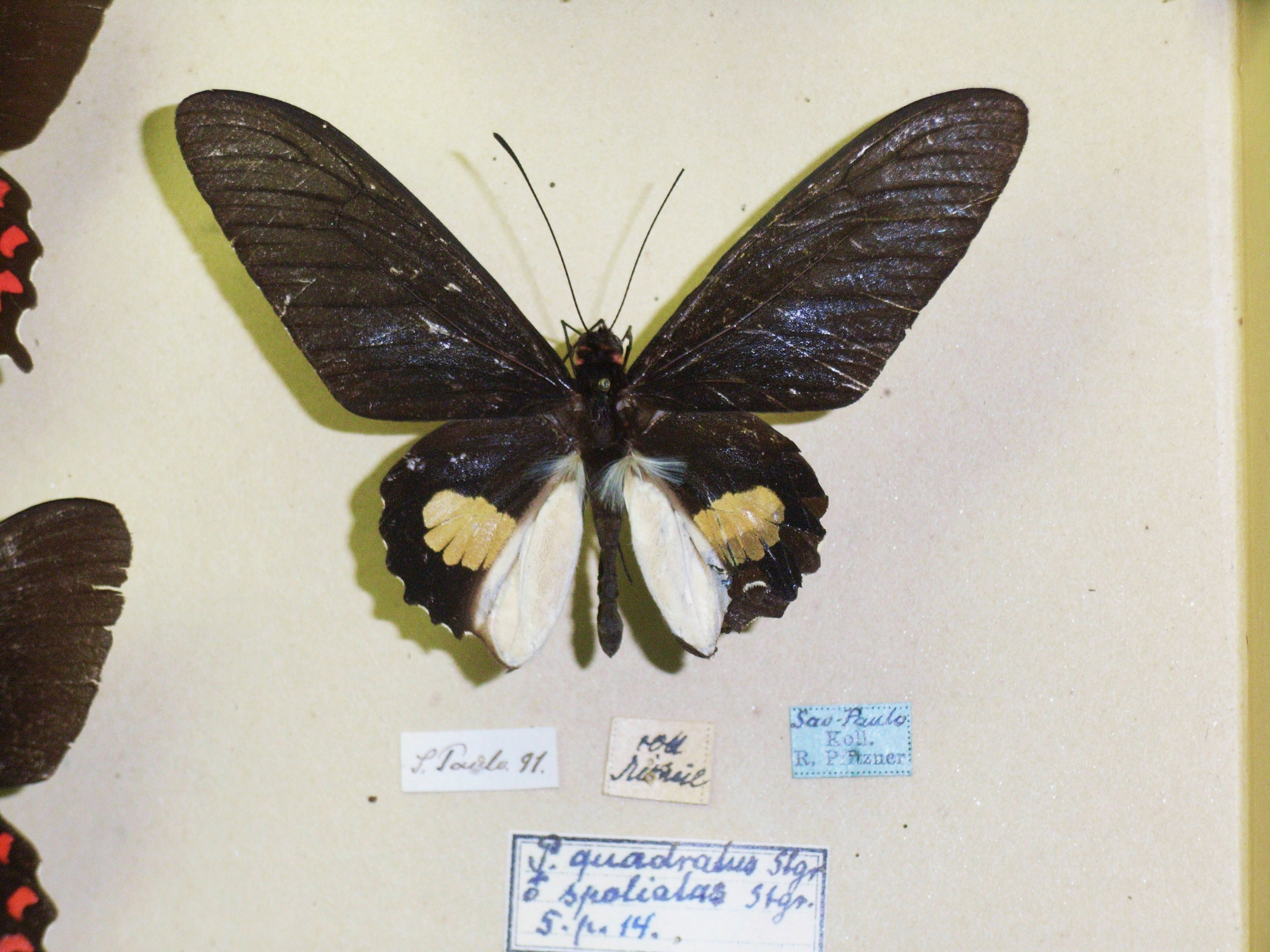
- Parides quadratus spoliatus in Museum Wiesbaden

Scientific classification
- Kingdom: Animalia
- Phylum: Arthropoda
- Class: Insecta
- Order: Lepidoptera
- Family: Papilionidae
- Genus: Parides
- Species: P. quadratus

Binomial name
- Parides quadratus (Staudinger, 1890)

Synonyms
- Papilio quadratus Staudinger, 1890; Papilio quadratus Staudinger, 1891; Papilio quadratus var. spoliatus Staudinger, 1898; Papilio quadratus punctatus Michael, 1931

= Parides quadratus =

Species of butterfly

Parides quadratus is a species of butterfly in the family Papilionidae. It is found in Brazil and Peru.

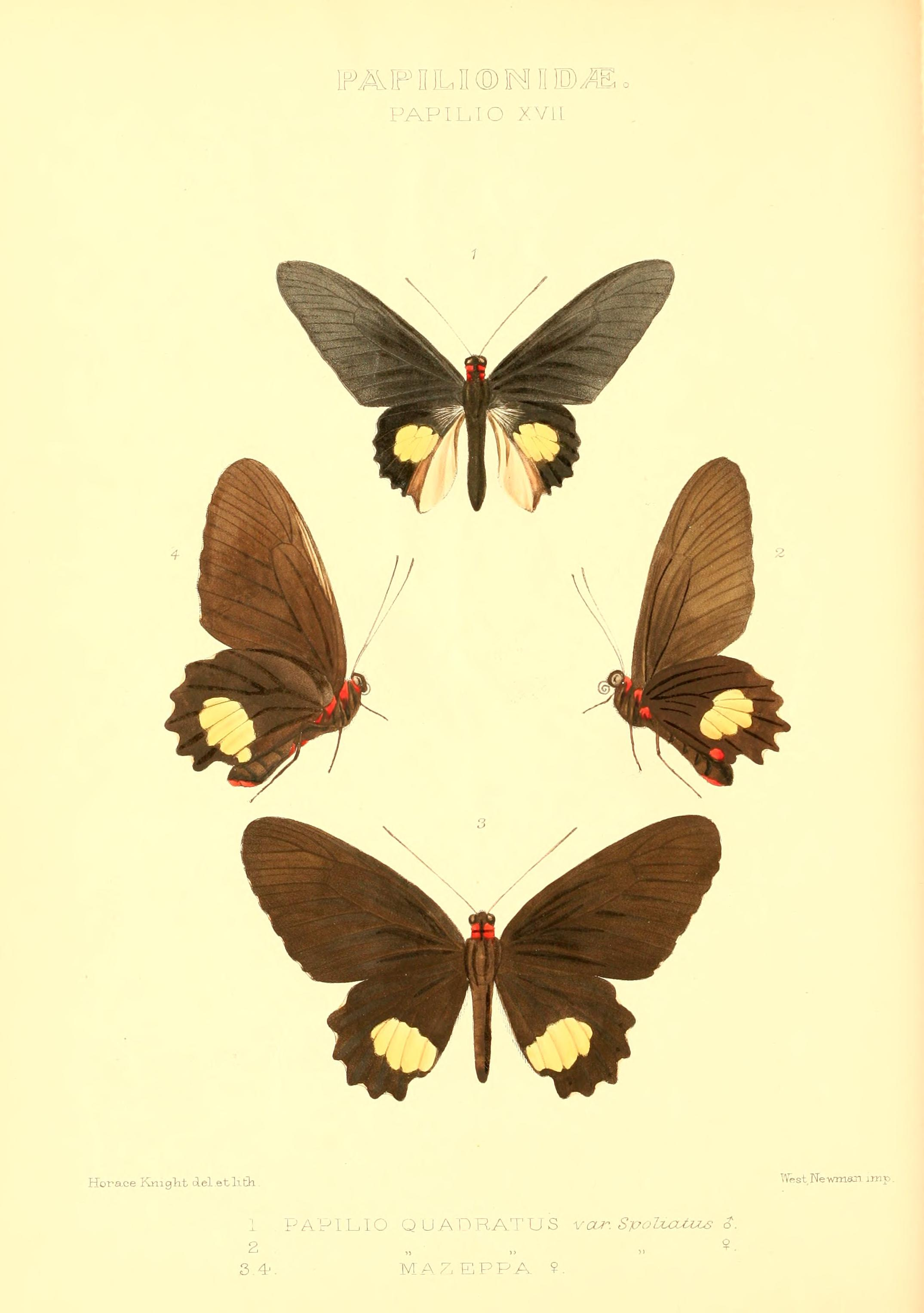
Papilio quadratus var. spoliatus 1 male, 2 female in Rhopalocera exotica

== Description ==
Forewing long; hindwing in both sexes with a band consisting of yellowish-white spots on the disc close to the cell, and on the under surface in addition with a red spot at the hind angle. In the name-typical form quadratus the forewing has a yellowish-white spot before the second median. In spoliatus Staudinger neither sex has a spot on the forewing.

== Taxonomy ==
Parides quadratus is a member of the chabrias species group

The members are

- Parides chabrias
- Parides coelus
- Parides hahneli
- Parides mithras
- Parides pizarro
- Parides quadratus

== Status ==
A rare species.

== Subspecies ==
- Parides quadratus quadratus (Brazil: eastern Amazonas)
- Parides quadratus spoliatus (Staudinger, 1898) (Brazil: western Amazonas, northern Peru)
