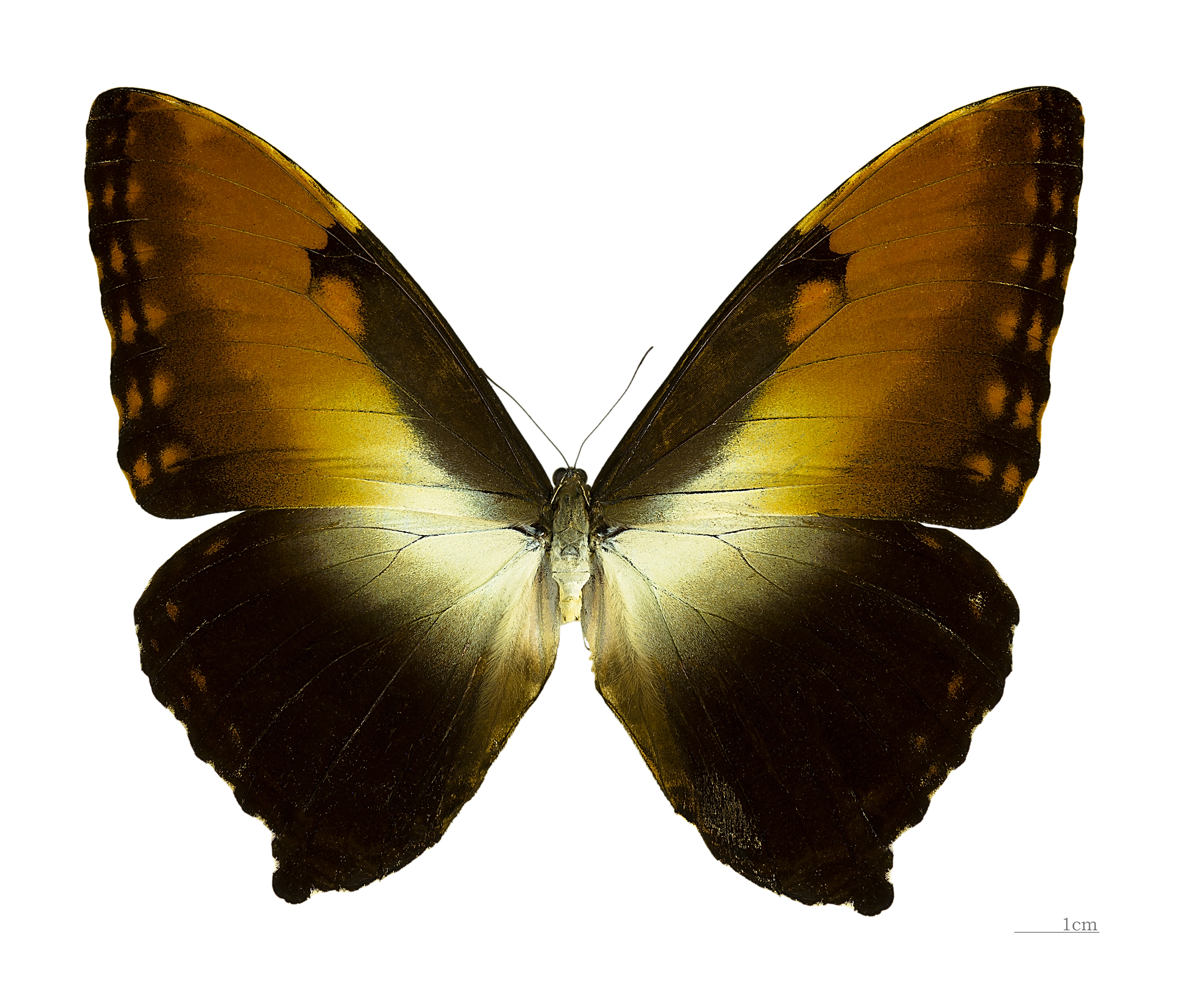
- Dorsal view of a male (MHNT)
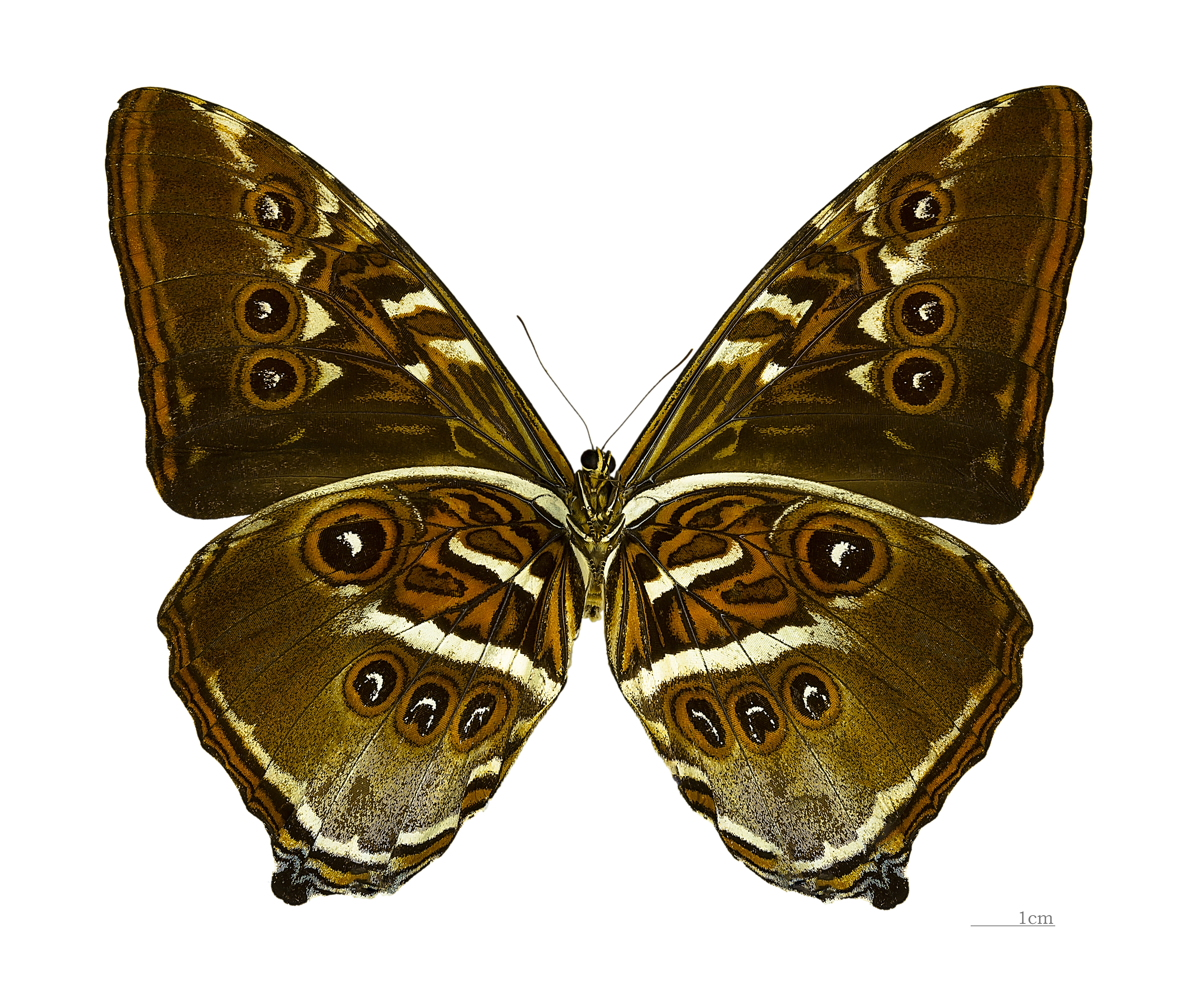
- Ventral view of the same specimen

Scientific classification
- Kingdom: Animalia
- Phylum: Arthropoda
- Clade: Pancrustacea
- Class: Insecta
- Order: Lepidoptera
- Family: Nymphalidae
- Genus: Morpho
- Species: M. hecuba

Binomial name
- Morpho hecuba Linnaeus, 1771

= Sunset morpho =

Species of butterfly

Morpho hecuba, the sunset morpho, is a Neotropical butterfly and the largest species in the genus Morpho. Its wingspan can reach 20 centimetres (7.9 in), but is usually from 13–15 centimetres (5.1–5.9 in). "M. hecuba is the largest known Morpho and one may also call it the most interesting, on account of its habits, its susceptibility to climatic influences and its tendency to develop polychromatic forms in both sexes."

== Geographic range ==
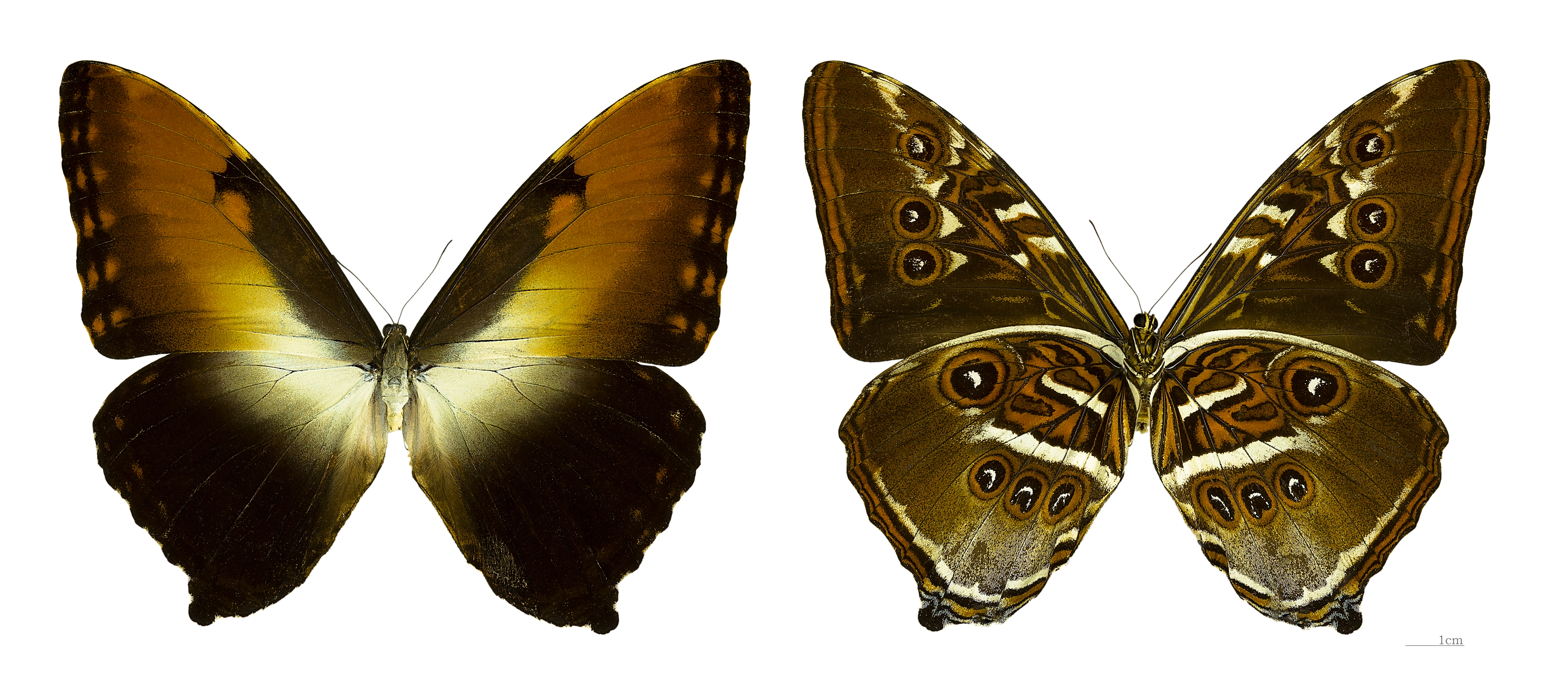
Dorsal and ventral views of a male

The sunset morpho is only found in the northern Amazon basin and the Guianas.

== Taxonomy ==
M. hecuba has several subspecies and has sometimes also included M. cisseis as a subspecies.hecuba is the sister species of Morpho cisseis.

== Behaviour ==
Plate from Adalbert Seitz. Compare the size of M. hecuba with that of the three Morpho species at the top of the page.

"We are indebted to Dr. Hahnel for the most detailed information of its habits of flight. Hahnel calls it the king of the forest, and says that it traverses a wider area than any other butterfly, travelling perhaps 30 km. or more in two or three hours, continuous flight in quest of its mate, which it follows persistently for whole days, quite alone, over woods and water-courses. In the distance the flight of Morpho hecuba looks quiet and slow, but nevertheless it moves quickly enough to evade the collector and newly emerged insects in particular adopt an impetuous pace during their first hours of flight. Sometimes it happens that one of these apparently quietly hovering forms suddenly darts head downwards, and in this event it seems only to rise again with difficulty. They are driven to these violent erratic movements by dragon-flies, which lie in wait for them especially in marshy places and molest them from the tips of dry twigs, apparently more out of wantonness than from a desire to catch them."

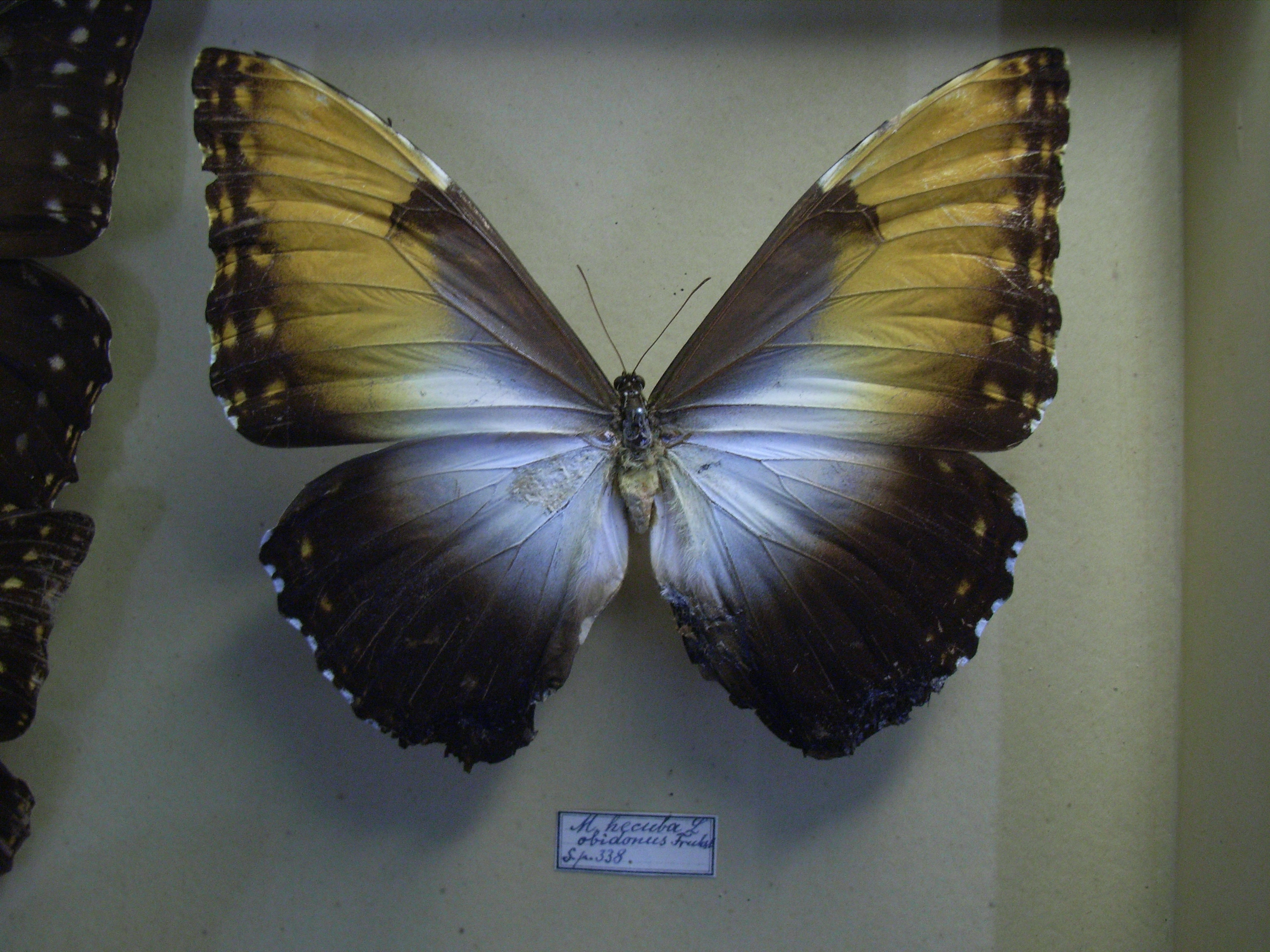
Morpho hecuba obidonus

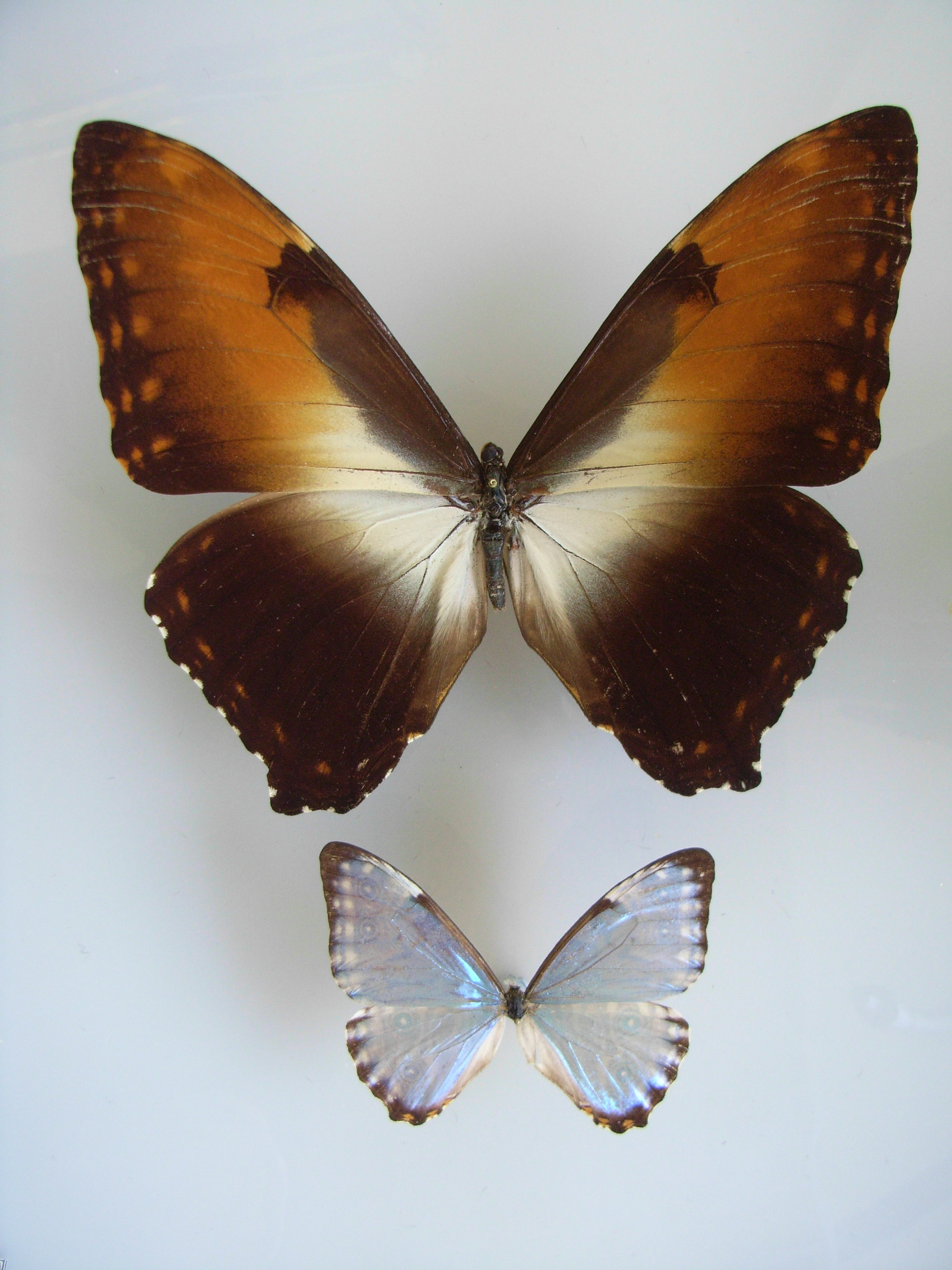
comparison

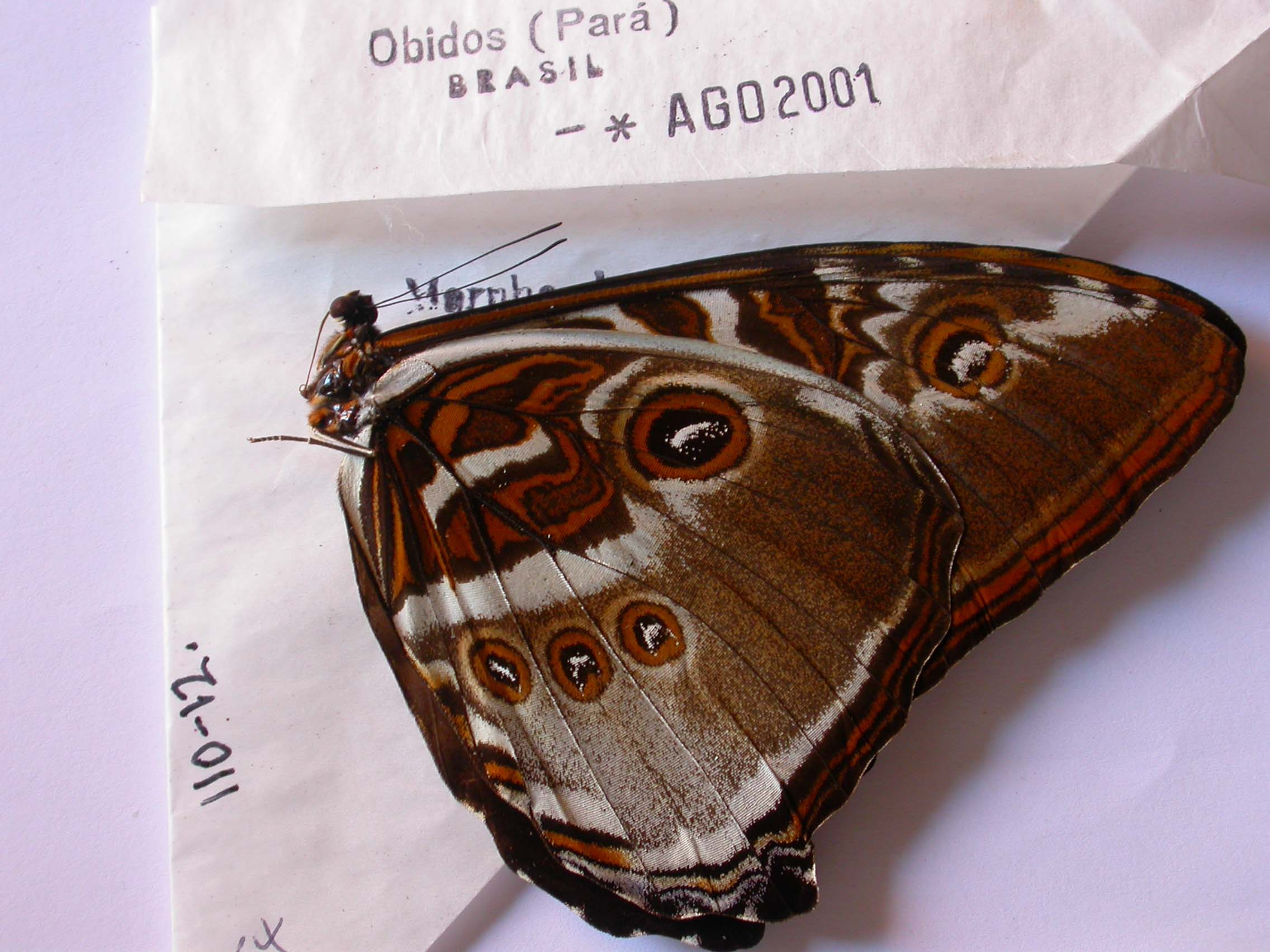
underside

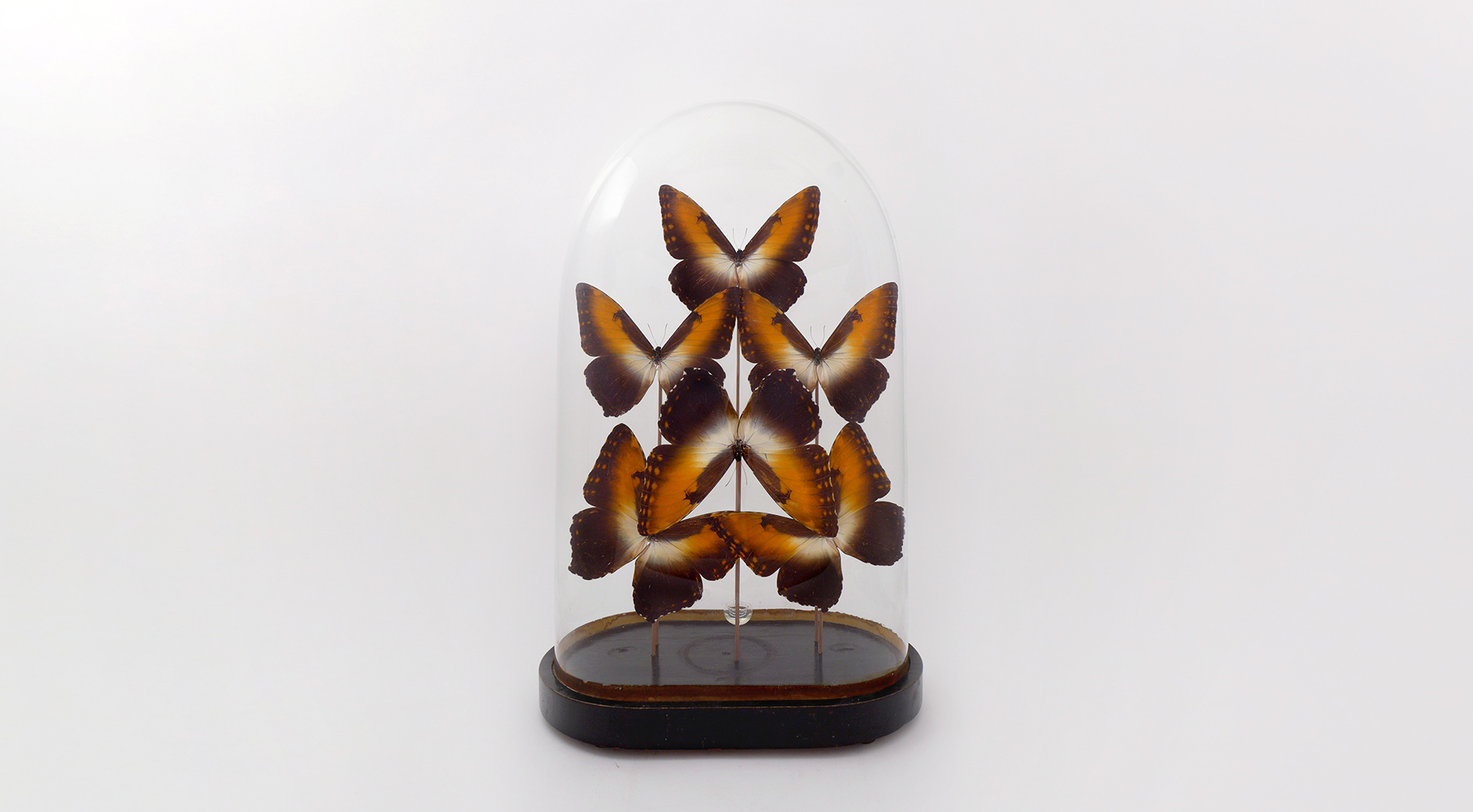
display case (Deyrolle)

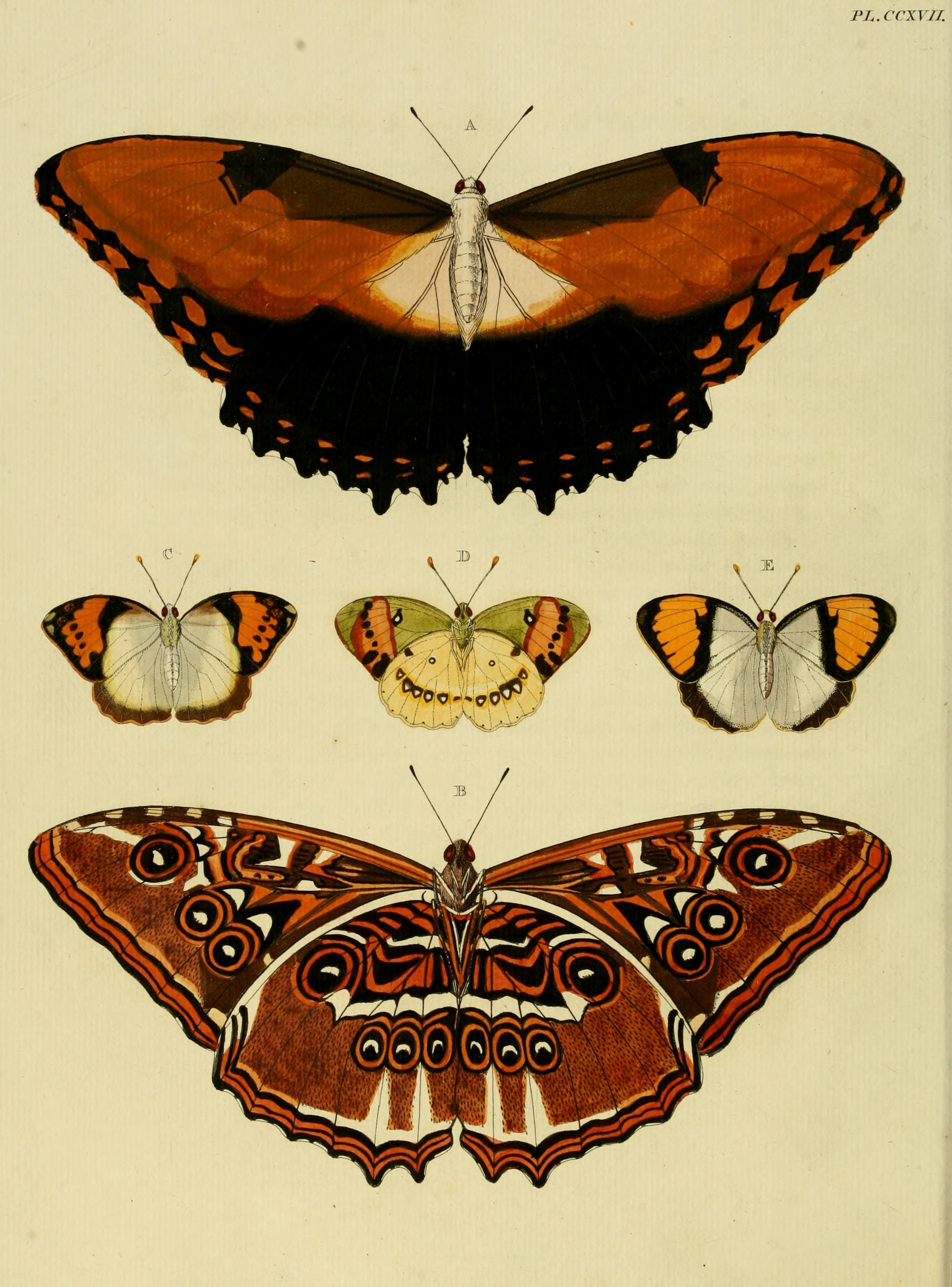
Illustration Cramer and Stoll Uitlandsche kapellen (1782)
