= Parides vercingetorix =

Conservation status
- Least Concern (IUCN 3.1)

Scientific classification
- Kingdom: Animalia
- Phylum: Arthropoda
- Clade: Pancrustacea
- Class: Insecta
- Order: Lepidoptera
- Family: Papilionidae
- Genus: Parides
- Species: P. vercingetorix

Binomial name
- Parides vercingetorix (Oberthür, 1888)

Synonyms
- Papilio coelus Boisduval, 1836 (non Stoll, 1781: preoccupied); Papilio vercingetorix Oberthür, 1888; Parides coelus (Boisduval, 1836, non Stoll, 1781: preoccupied)

Species of butterfly

Parides vercingetorix is a species of butterfly in the family Papilionidae. It is endemic to French Guiana. Formerly, this species was known as Parides coelus and originally described as Papilio coelus by Jean Baptiste Boisduval in 1836, but that name was already used in 1781 by Stoll for the butterfly now known as Aguna coelus. Consequently, the Parides species had to receive a new name.

== Description ==
Forewing with a white spot, obsolete at the margins, which fills up the extremity of the cell, and extends on to the disc. Hindwing with red band on the disc, in the male composed of four spots, in the female of six. A full description is provided by Rothschild, W. and Jordan, K. (1906)

== Description from Seitz ==
P. coelus Boisd. (male = vercingetorix Oberth.) (Id). Forewing with a white spot, obsolete at the margins, which fills up the extremity of the cell, and extends on to the disc. Hindwing with red band on the disc, in the male composed of four spots, in the female of six. — French Guiana, the male in Oberthur's Collection, one female in the Paris Museum.

== Taxonomy ==
Parides vercingetorix is a member of the chabrias species group

The members are

- Parides chabrias
- Parides coelus
- Parides hahneli
- Parides mithras
- Parides pizarro
- Parides quadratus

== Status ==
A rare little known species.
