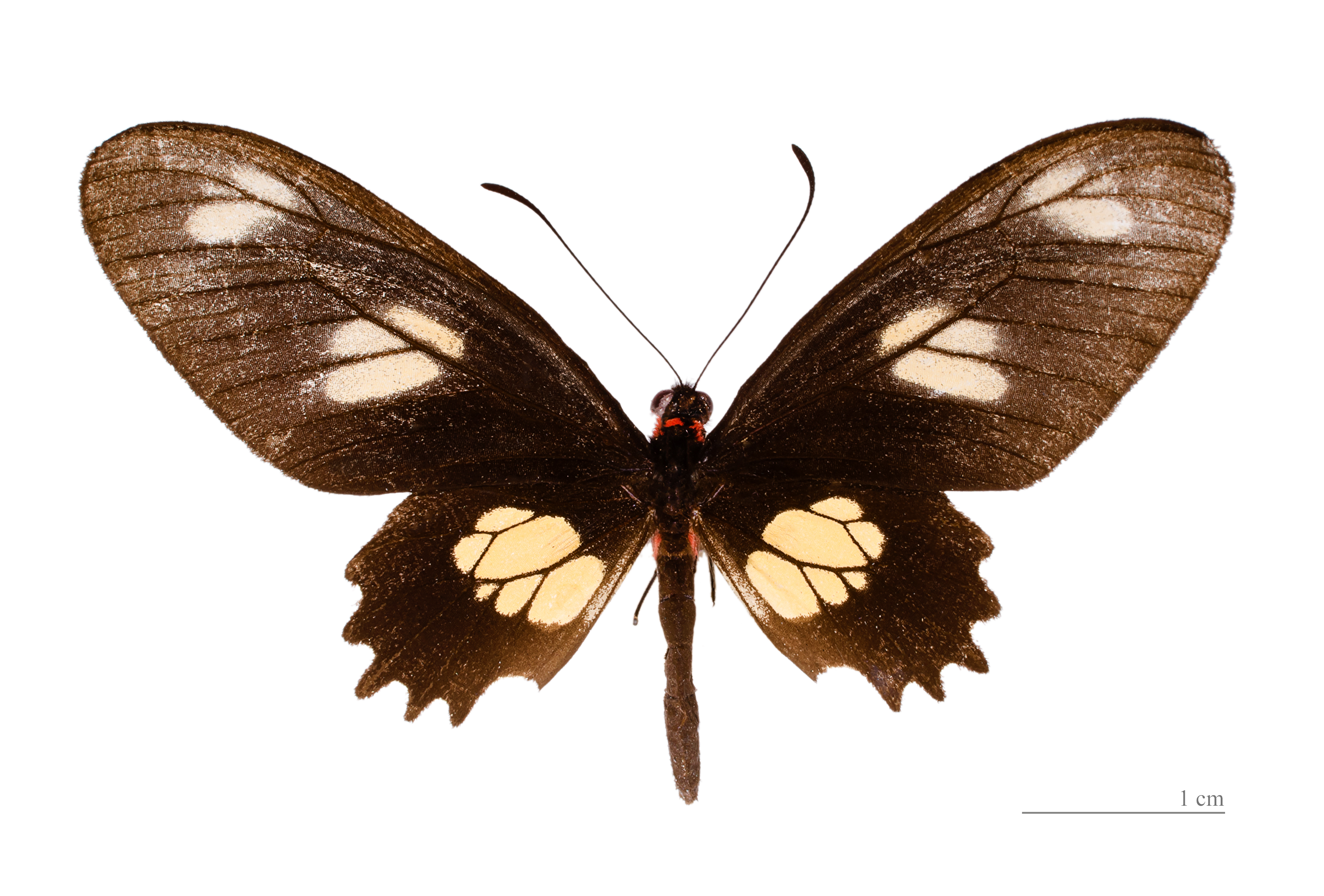
- Parides chabrias ygdrasilla female

Conservation status
- Data Deficient (IUCN 2.3)

Scientific classification
- Kingdom: Animalia
- Phylum: Arthropoda
- Class: Insecta
- Order: Lepidoptera
- Family: Papilionidae
- Genus: Parides
- Species: P. chabrias

Binomial name
- Parides chabrias (Hewitson, [1852])

Synonyms
- Papilio chabrias Hewitson, 1852; Papilio nymphas Grose-Smith, 1902; Papilio chabrias var. olivencia Le Moult, 1926; Papilio chabrias ab. aloisi Le Moult, 1926; Papilio chabrias ab. subaloisi Le Moult, 1926; Papilio chabrias ab. continua Krüger, 1933; Papilio triopas Godart, 1819; Papilio triopas ab. trimaculatus Krüger, 1934

= Parides chabrias =

Species of butterfly

Parides chabrias is a species of butterfly in the family Papilionidae. It is found in Brazil (Amazonas), Ecuador and Peru. It is a woodland species. The female flies slowly near the ground, whilst the male has a swifter flight and generally remains at a considerable height.

The larva feeds on Aristolochia burchelli and A. didyma.

== Subspecies ==
- Parides chabrias chabrias (Brazil: Amazonas, Ecuador, Peru) The forewing in both sexes has a row of submarginal spots, which however are often wanting in the female. The central area of the hindwing is situated somewhat further towards the margin than in ygdrasilla, consequently the cell-spot is smaller. A full description is provided by Rothschild, W. and Jordan, K. (1906)
- Parides chabrias ygdrasilla Hemming, 1935 (Brazil: Pará, Guianas)

== Taxonomy ==
Parides chabrias is a member of the chabrias species group.

The members are

- Parides chabrias
- Parides coelus
- Parides hahneli
- Parides mithras
- Parides pizarro
- Parides quadratus

== Etymology ==
Named in the Classical tradition for the Athenian general Chabrias.
