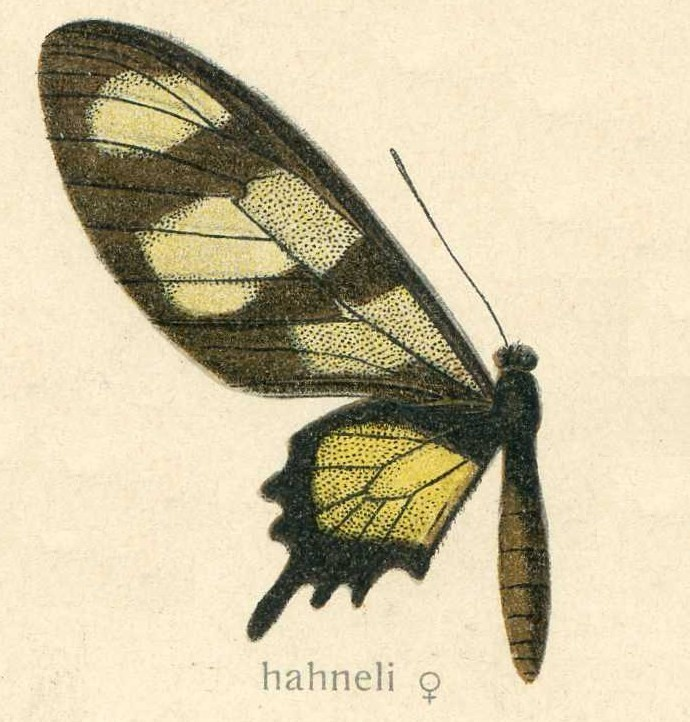
- In Adalbert Seitz's Macrolepidoptera of the World

Conservation status
- Data Deficient (IUCN 3.1)

Scientific classification
- Kingdom: Animalia
- Phylum: Arthropoda
- Clade: Pancrustacea
- Class: Insecta
- Order: Lepidoptera
- Family: Papilionidae
- Genus: Parides
- Species: P. hahneli

Binomial name
- Parides hahneli (Staudinger, 1882)

= Parides hahneli =

Hahnel's Amazonian swallowtail

Species of butterfly

Parides hahneli, the Hahnel's Amazonian swallowtail, is a species of butterfly in the family Papilionidae. It is endemic to Brazil in the states of Rondônia, Mato Grosso, Amazonas and Pará, where it was placed on the list of endangered species in 2008.

The butterfly was named to honour its collector Paul Hahnel. "Collecting in the neighbourhood of the Amazon, from Para to the foot of the Andes, seems to be more difficult nowadays than formerly. It is true the steamboat takes the collector from place to place, but in the neighbourhood of the larger settlements there is no longer much for him to seek, and living has become extraordinarily expensive. And it is difficult to find a place near the forest fit to live in and secure against flagrant robbery, and the collector is very dependent upon chance in this respect."

== Description ==
It has tails. The forewing has three yellow-grey bands or patches; hindwing with area of the same colour, occupying the greater part of the wing. A technical description is provided by Rothschild, W. and Jordan, K. (1906)

== Taxonomy ==
Parides hahneli is a member of the chabrias species group

The members are

- Parides chabrias
- Parides coelus
- Parides hahneli
- Parides mithras
- Parides pizarro
- Parides quadratus

== Status ==
Parides hahneli is rare.

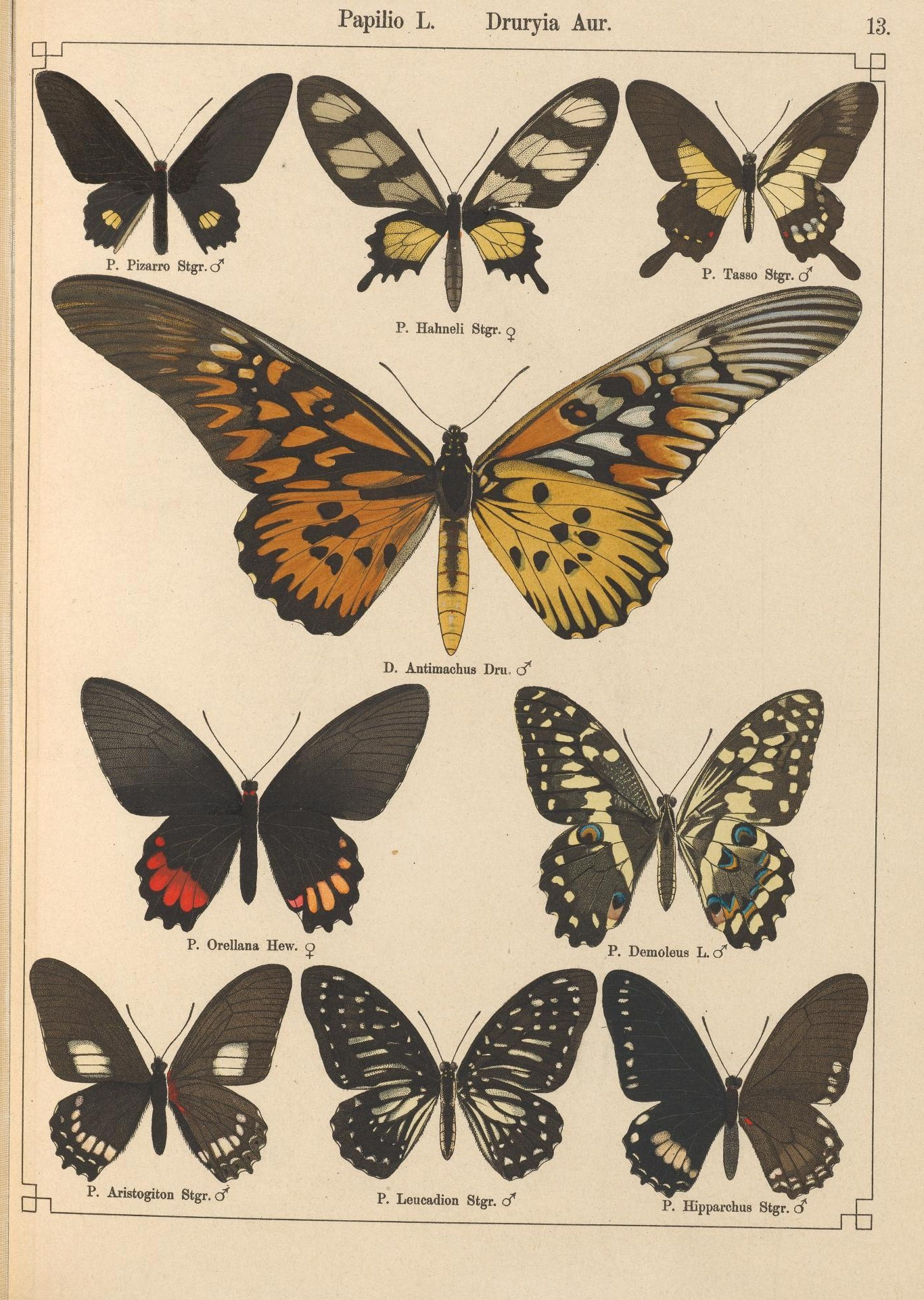
in Staudinger & Schatz, Exotische schmetterlinge

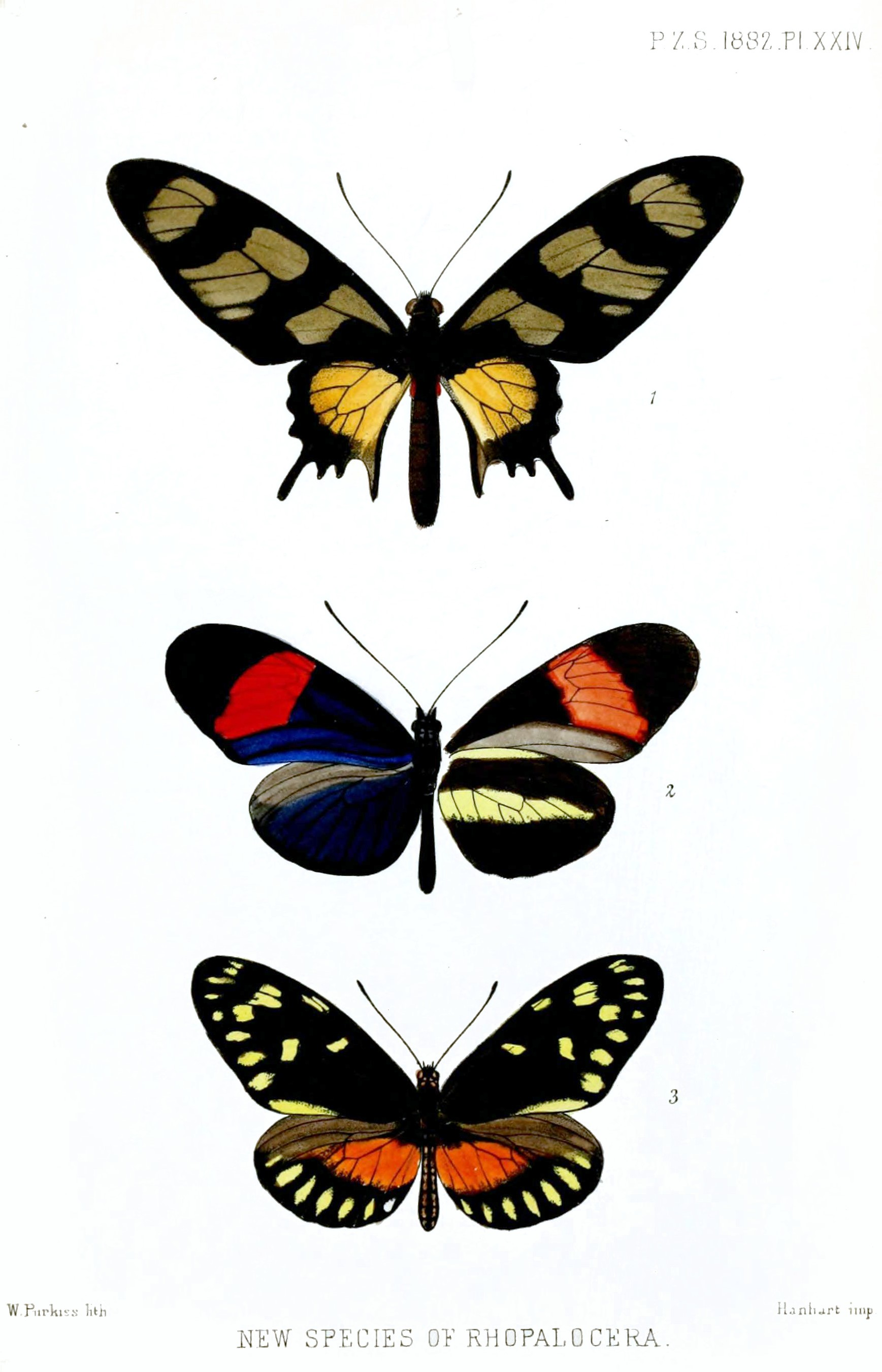
in Proceedings of the Zoological Society

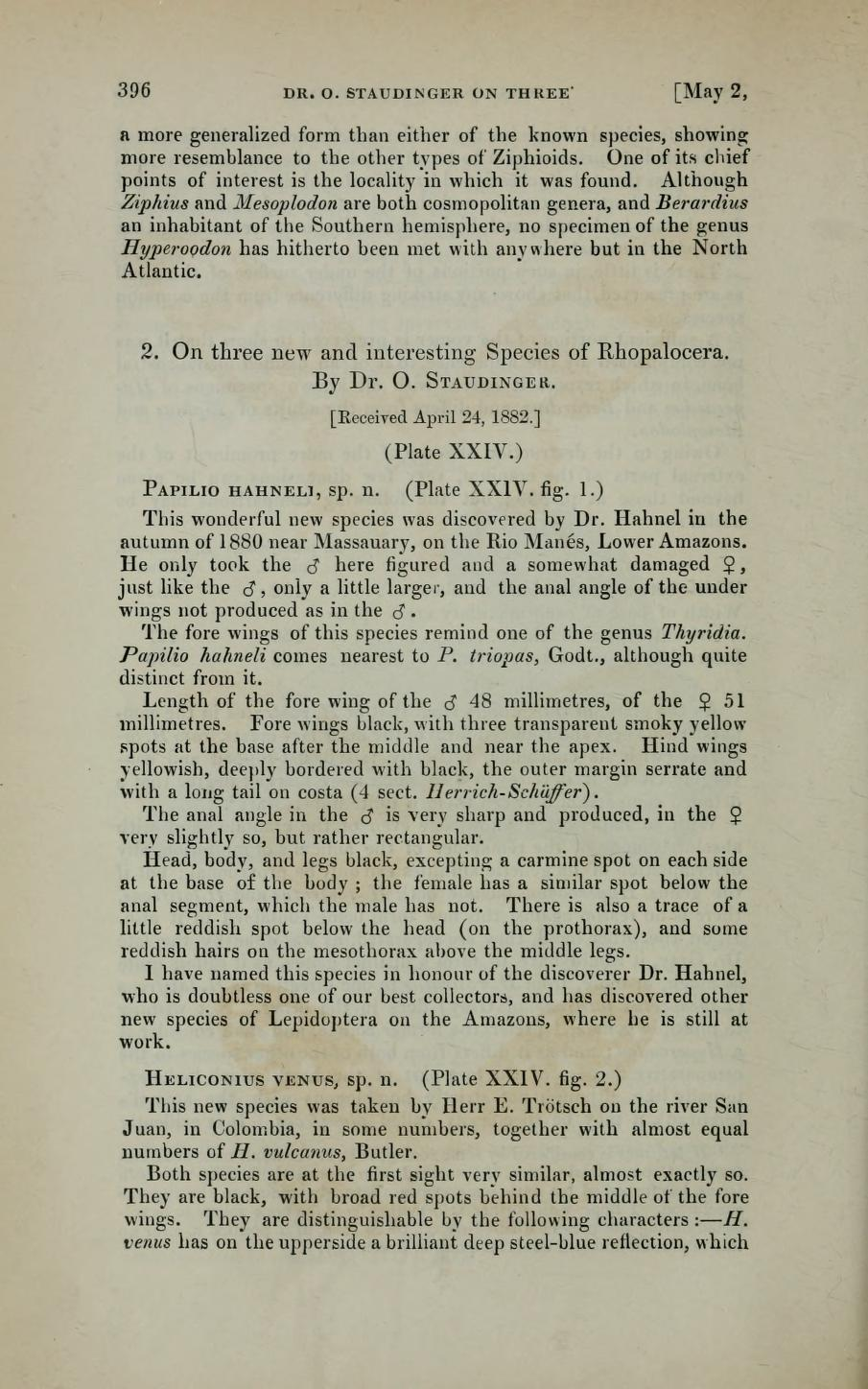
Original description

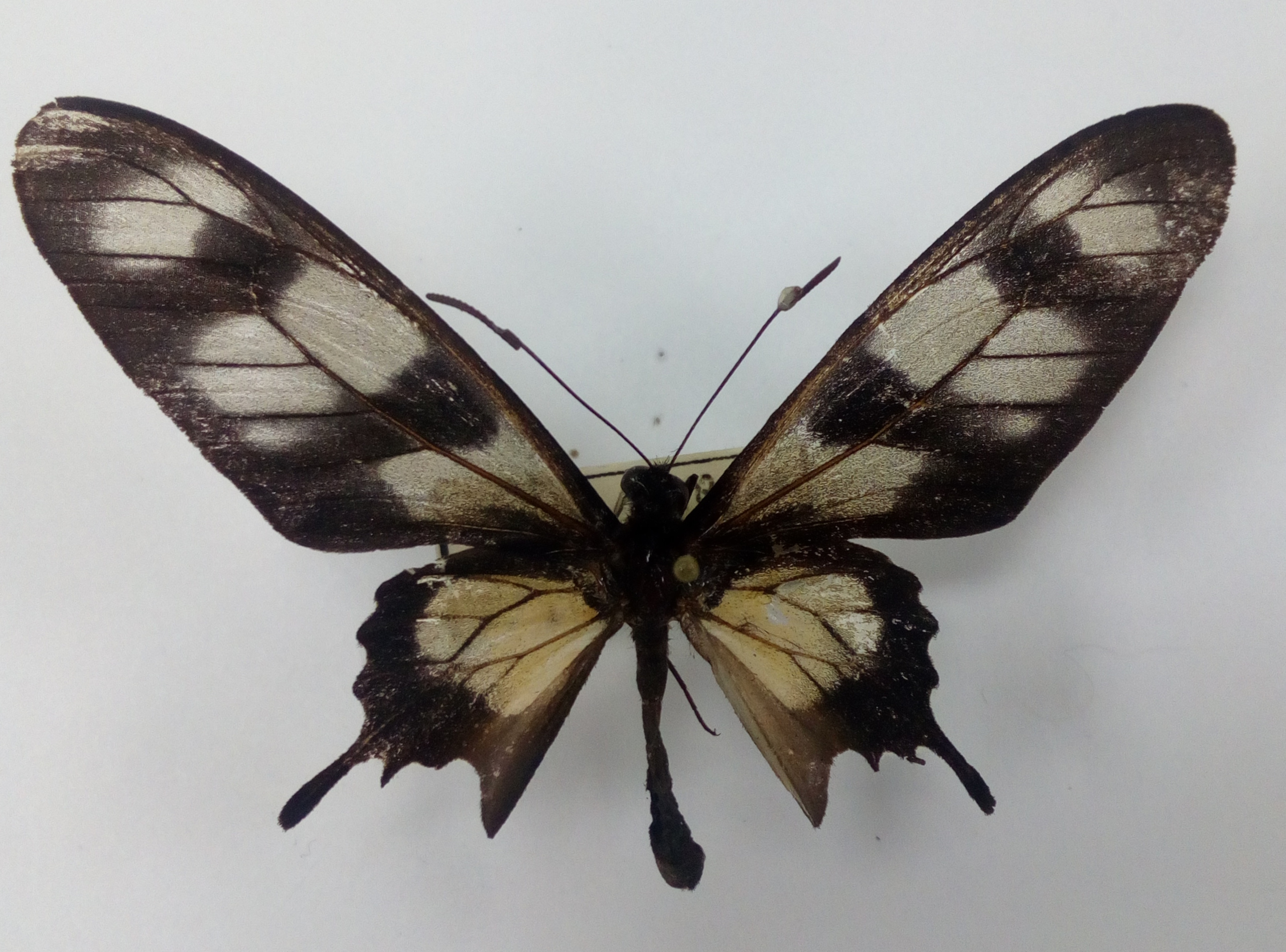
Specimen
