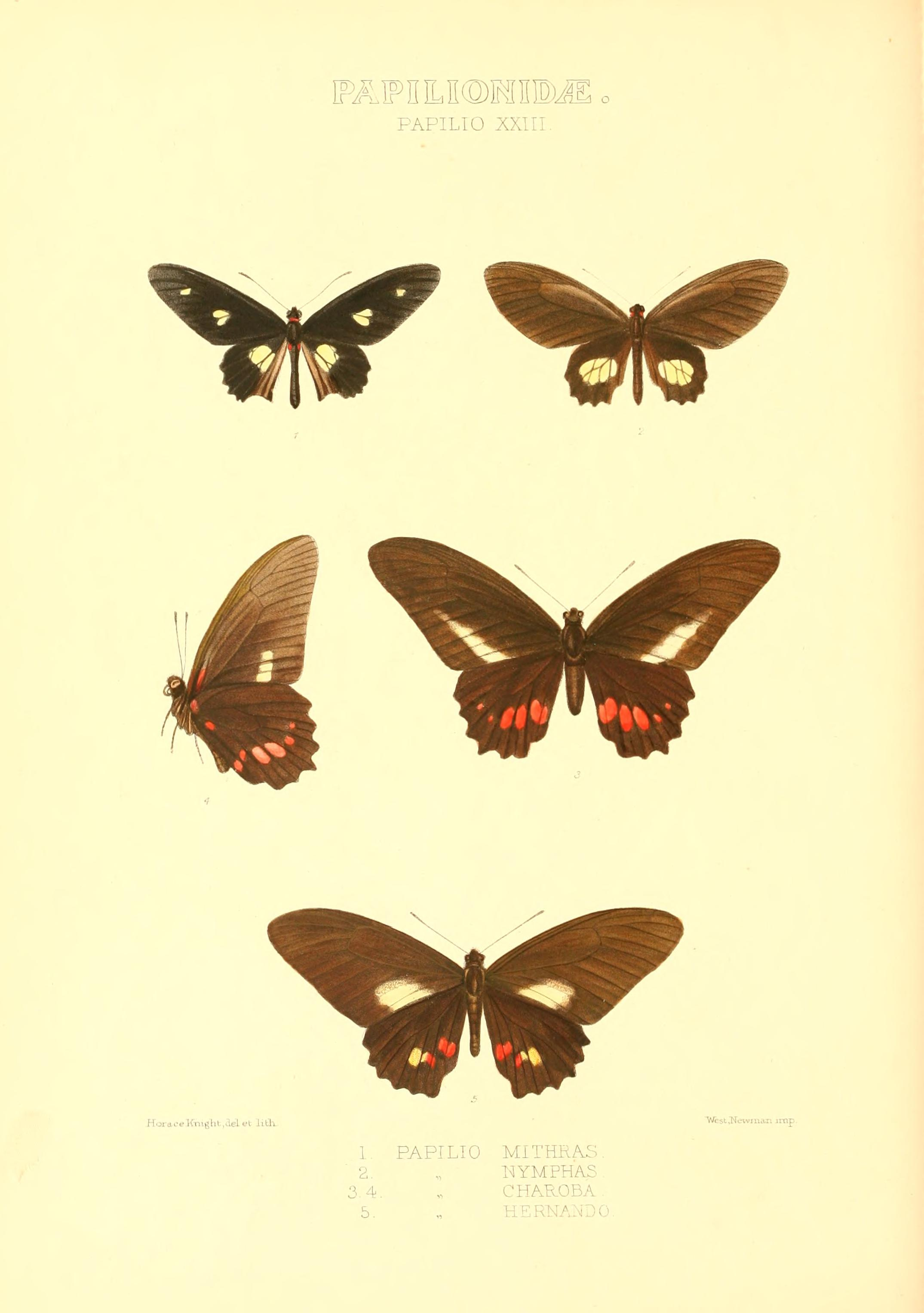
- Plate accompanying original description

Scientific classification
- Kingdom: Animalia
- Phylum: Arthropoda
- Class: Insecta
- Order: Lepidoptera
- Family: Papilionidae
- Genus: Parides
- Species: P. mithras

Binomial name
- Parides mithras (Grose-Smith, 1902)

Synonyms
- Papilio mithras Grose-Smith, 1902

= Parides mithras =

Species of butterfly

Parides mithras is a species of butterfly in the family Papilionidae. It is found in Venezuela, Guyana, French Guiana and Brazil (Amazonas).

Parides mithras is very similar to Parides chabrias but has paler and smaller spots, especially the last spot of the hindwing above. Rothshild and Jordan considered it to be a subspecies of P. triopas Godart, which is a synonym for Parides chabrias.

== Original description ==
Expanse: 2 1/2 inches (6.5 cm). Male. Upperside. Both wings jet black. Anterior wings with three oval pale biscuit-coloured spots, one towards the apex, above the upper discoidal nervule, and two others on either side of the middle median nervule adjacent to the median nervure. Posterior wings with a large biscuit-coloured spot extending over the outer two-thirds of the cell, two small similarly coloured spots above, and two others below the cell, the spot nearest the inner margin four times the size of the others. Cilia between the veins narrowly white. Underside. Both wings dull black with spots as on the upperside.

Female resembles the male, but the anterior wings are rounder towards the apex; on those wings there is an additional spot above the lowest subcostal nervule, and an elongate spot in the cell on the inner side of the median nervure.

It was found in British Guiana and is in the collections of the British Museum (two specimens) and of Henley Grose-Smith (four specimens).

This species is very close to P. triopas, Godt., which is a larger species, browner in the colour of the wings, the spots on which are yellower. The specimens of P. triopas examined all have three subapical spots on the anterior wings, and on the posterior wings there are two small spots at the end of the cell, which are absent in both sexes of P. mithras.

== Subspecies ==
There are two subspecies

- P. m. mithras range including Brazil
- P. m. marajoara Brown, 1994 Brazil only

== Biology ==
The larva feeds on Aristolochia acutifolia.

== Status ==
Not uncommon but not known to be threatened.

== Taxonomy ==
Parides mithras is a member of the chabrias species group.

The members are:

- Parides chabrias
- Parides coelus
- Parides hahneli
- Parides mithras
- Parides pizarro
- Parides quadratus
