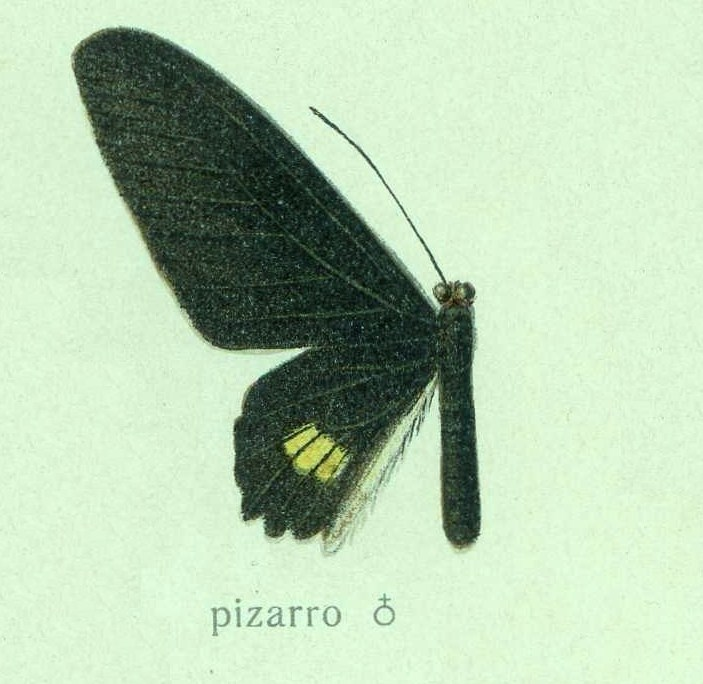
- Parides pizarro male from Seitz

Conservation status
- Least Concern (IUCN 3.1)

Scientific classification
- Kingdom: Animalia
- Phylum: Arthropoda
- Clade: Pancrustacea
- Class: Insecta
- Order: Lepidoptera
- Family: Papilionidae
- Genus: Parides
- Species: P. pizarro

Binomial name
- Parides pizarro (Staudinger, 1884)

Synonyms
- Parides steinbachi (Rothschild, 1905); Papilio steinbachi Rothschild, 1905

= Parides pizarro =

Species of butterfly

Parides pizarro is a species of butterfly in the family Papilionidae. It is found in Colombia, Brazil, Bolivia and Peru.

== Description ==
Abdomen in the male quite black, in the female with a red spot before the apex on the underside. Forewing without spots, also none in the fringes. Hindwing with whitish yellow area, which in the male consists of three or four spots, in the female of three to six. A full description is provided by Rothschild, W. and Jordan, K. (1906)

== Taxonomy ==
Parides pizarro is a member of the chabrias species group

The members are

- Parides chabrias
- Parides coelus
- Parides hahneli
- Parides mithras
- Parides pizarro
- Parides quadratus

== Status ==
A rare species. Protected in Tambopata National Reserve in Peru.

== Subspecies ==
- Parides pizarro pizarro (Staudinger, 1884)
- Parides pizarro kuhlmanni (E. May, 1925)
- Parides pizarro steinbachi (Rothschild, 1905) Forewing in both sexes with a large white spot before hind margin; hindwing with a red band. Bolivia.

== Etymology ==
Named for Francisco Pizarro.

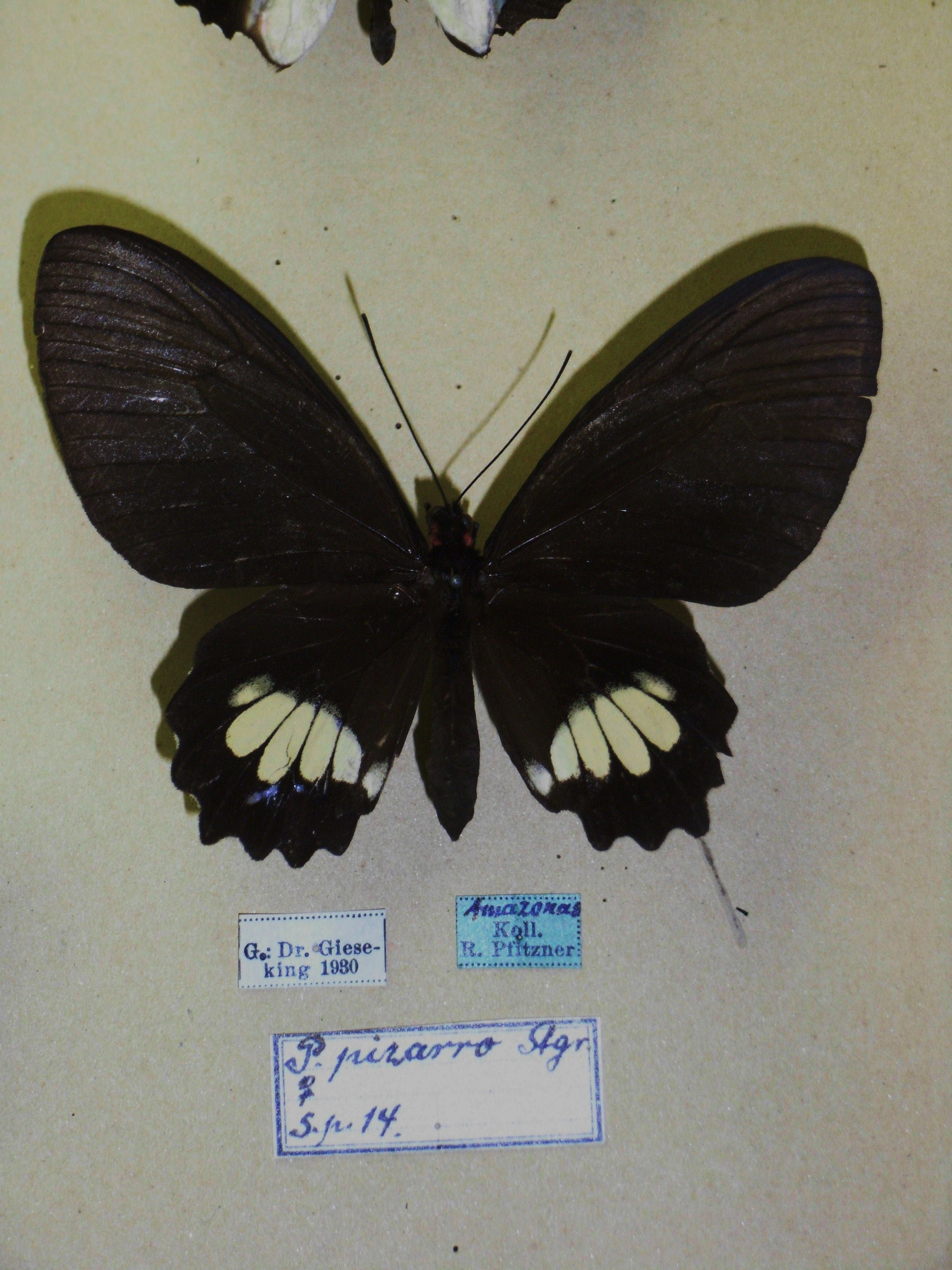

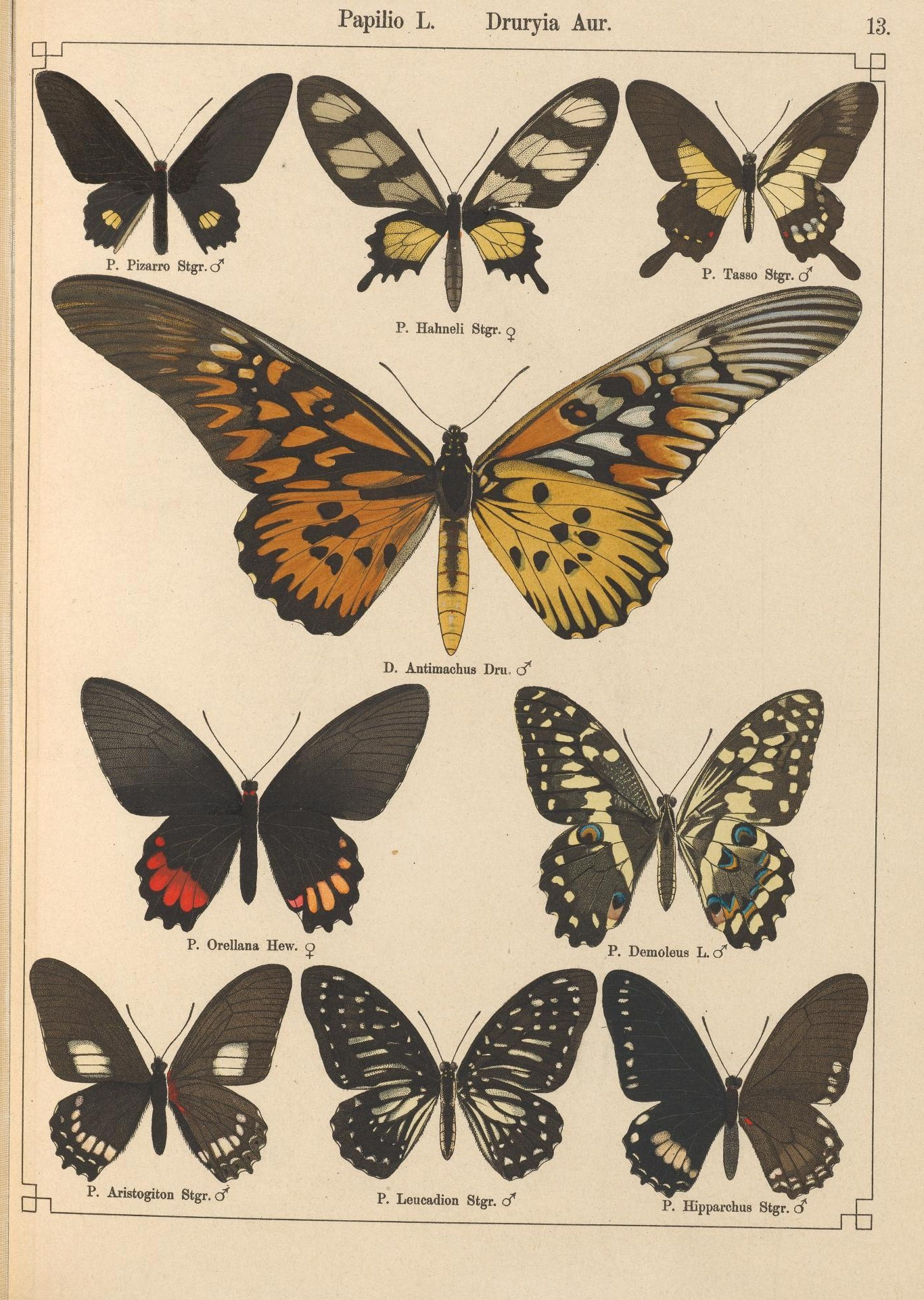
