= Paul Hahnel =

German entomologist

Paul Hahnel (born 17 April 1843, Schlegenberg, Landkreis Leobschütz, Silesia and died 12 May 1887, Manicore) was a collector of Lepidoptera and Coleoptera. He travelled in Venezuela (1877/79), and made two expeditions to the Amazon. the first from 1879 to 1884 and the second, with Otto Michael, from 1885 to 1887. His collection was sold to Otto Staudinger and Andreas Bang-Haas.

Based on Hahnel's collection of frogs from Yurimaguas, Peru, George Albert Boulenger described eight new species and named one of them, Ameerega hahneli, after him. The butterfly Parides hahneli was also named in his honour.
