= Otto Michael =

German explorer, zoologist and entomologist

Otto Michael (1859–1934)

Otto Michael (1859–1934) was a German explorer, zoologist and entomologist. He made three expeditions to the Amazon, 1885–1888 (until 1887 accompanied by Paul Hahnel ), 1889–1893 and 1894–1921, collecting mainly Lepidoptera for the dealership Otto Staudinger Andreas Bang-Haas.
