= Hermathena =

Hermathena may refer to:

- Hermathena (composite of Hermes and Athena), a Janus-like bust of Hermes and Athena
- Hermathena (journal), an academic journal of the classical world published by Trinity College Dublin
- Hermathena (butterfly), a genus of butterfly in the family Riodinidae
  - Hermathena oweni
  - Hermathena candidata
  - Hermathena eburna
- Hermathena longwing, a species of butterfly (Heliconius hermathena) of the family Nymphalidae
