= Lucilia =

Lucilia may refer to:

- Lucilia (wife of Lucretius), the wife of Roman philosopher Lucretius
- Lucilia (fly), a greenbottle fly genus in the family Calliphoridae
- Lucilia (plant), a plant genus in the family Asteraceae

and also:

- Napaea lucilia, a butterfly species in the genus Napaea (Mesosemiini, Riodinidae)
- Sabatinca lucilia, a moth species

== See also ==
- Lucilius
