= Napaea =

Napaea may refer to:

- Napaea (butterfly), a metalmark butterflies genus in the subfamily Mesosemiini and the family Riodinidae
- Napaea (plant), a flowering plant genus in the family Malvaceae

== Species ==
- Boloria napaea, the mountain fritillary, a butterfly species
- Litoria napaea, the Snow Mountains treefrog, a frog species endemic to Indonesia
- Sicista napaea, the Altai birch mouse, a rodent species found in Kazakhstan and Russia

== See also ==
- Napaeae, in Greek mythology
