= Voltinia =

Voltinia may refer to:

- Voltinia (butterfly), a genus of metalmark butterflies
- one of the Servian tribes of ancient Rome.
