= Eurybia =

Eurybia may refer to:

- Eurybia (mythology), the daughter of Pontus and Gaia in Greek mythology
- Eurybia (plant), a genus from the family of asters, daisies, and sunflowers
- Eurybia (butterfly), a genus of metalmark butterflies

== See also ==
- Eurabia conspiracy theory, an Islamophobic conspiracy theory
