= Voltinia dramba =

Voltinia dramba Temporal range: 25–15 Ma

Scientific classification
- Kingdom: Animalia
- Phylum: Arthropoda
- Class: Insecta
- Order: Lepidoptera
- Family: Riodinidae
- Genus: Voltinia
- Species: †V. dramba

Binomial name
- †Voltinia dramba Hall, Robbins & Harvey 2004

Extinct species of butterfly

Voltinia dramba is a fossil metalmark butterfly, found in pieces of amber in the Dominican Republic on the island of Hispaniola in 2004. The butterfly, belonging to the extant genus Voltinia, is the first species to be taxonomically described from amber and the first true fossil of an adult riodinid. Five specimens, all females, were found in pieces of amber from the resin of the extinct leguminous tree Hymenaea protera (Poinar 1991). Also, the genus Voltinia contains nine heterogeneous species that range from Mexico to Brazil. The fossil appeared to be 15-25 million years old and it's a holotype female fossil. However, the fossil's origin may be unknown, it is ingrained in highly polymerized Dominican amber.
