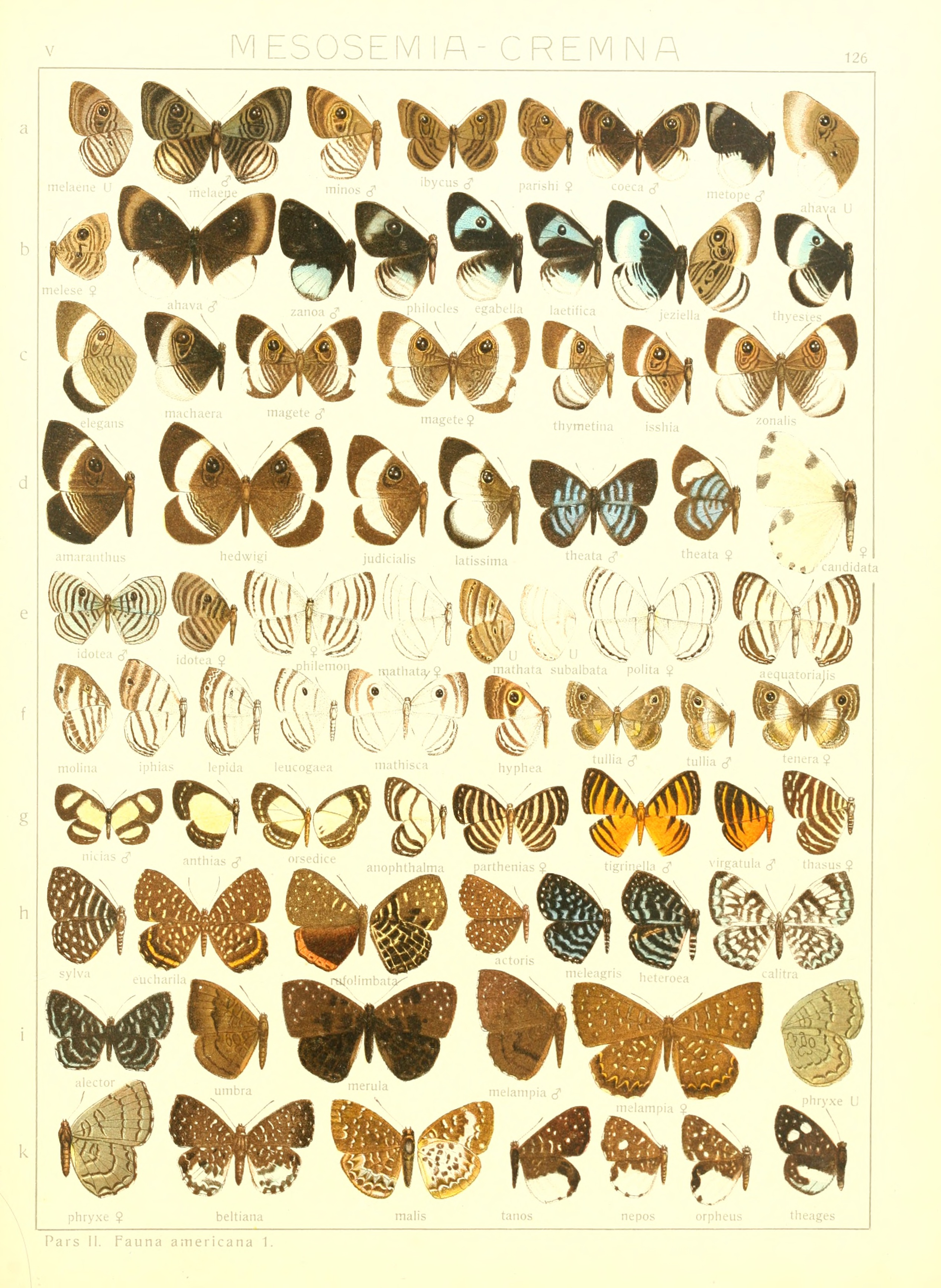

Scientific classification
- Domain: Eukaryota
- Kingdom: Animalia
- Phylum: Arthropoda
- Class: Insecta
- Order: Lepidoptera
- Family: Riodinidae
- Subfamily: Riodininae
- Tribe: Mesosemiini
- Genus: Hermathena
- Species: H. candidata

Binomial name
- Hermathena candidata (Hewitson, 1874)

= Hermathena candidata =

Species of butterfly

Hermathena candidata is a species of butterfly in genus Hermathena of the family Riodinidae. It is found from Costa Rica to Colombia, the Guianas and Bolivia east of Andes.

The larvae feed on Vriesea species.

== Subspecies ==
- Hermathena candidata candidata (Bolivia)
- Hermathena candidata columba Stichel, 1910 (Colombia)
