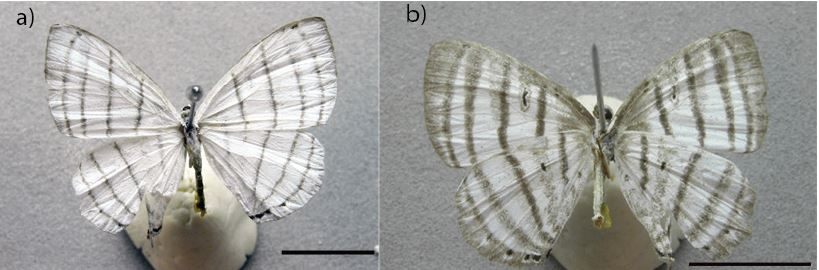

Scientific classification
- Domain: Eukaryota
- Kingdom: Animalia
- Phylum: Arthropoda
- Class: Insecta
- Order: Lepidoptera
- Family: Riodinidae
- Genus: Leucochimona
- Species: L. icare

Binomial name
- Leucochimona icare (Hübner, [1819])

Synonyms
- Mesosemia icare Hübner, [1819]; Papilio philemon Cramer, [1775]; Papilio icarus Fabricius, 1776 (preocc. Rottemburg, 1775); Mesosemia chionea Godman & Salvin, [1885]; Mesosemia matatha Hewitson, 1873; Mesosemia nivea Godman & Salvin, [1885]; Diophthalma icare subalbata Seitz, 1913

= Leucochimona icare =

Species of butterfly

Leucochimona icare, also known as the Amazonian whitemark, is a species of butterfly in the family Riodinidae. It is found in French Guiana, Guyana, Suriname, Colombia, Bolivia and Brazil.

== Subspecies ==
- Leucochimona icare icare (Surinam, Guyana)
- Leucochimona icare matatha (Hewitson, 1873) (Brazil: Minas Gerais)
- Leucochimona icare nivea (Godman & Salvin, 1885) (Bolivia)
- Leucochimona icare polita Stichel, 1910 (Colombia)
- Leucochimona icare subalbata (Seitz, 1913) (Bolivia)
