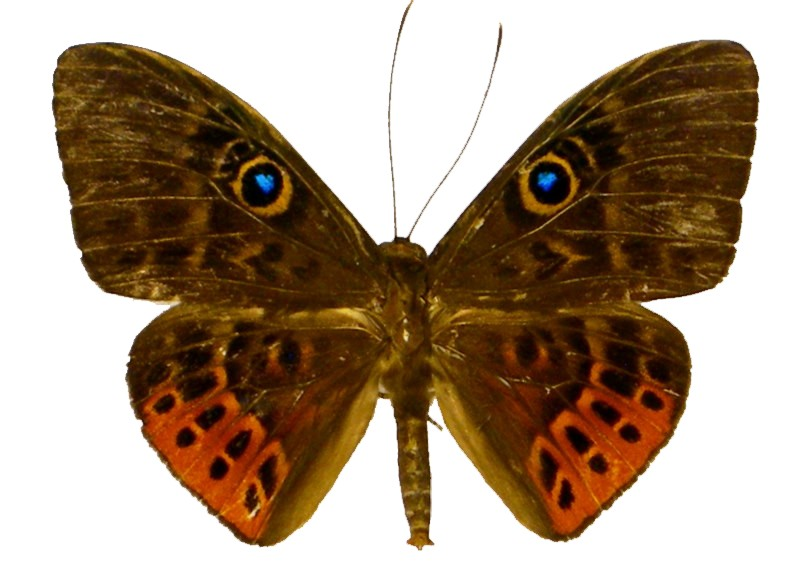
- Eurybia patrona

Scientific classification
- Kingdom: Animalia
- Phylum: Arthropoda
- Clade: Pancrustacea
- Class: Insecta
- Order: Lepidoptera
- Family: Riodinidae
- Subfamily: Riodininae
- Tribe: Eurybiini; Reuter, 1896

Genera
- Alesa; Eurybia

= Eurybiini =

Tribe of butterflies

The Eurybiini are a small tribe of metalmark butterflies (family Riodinidae). They are one of the basal tribes of the Riodininae, outside the main radiation but not quite as primitive as the Mesosemiini. Though numerous Riodinidae genera have not yet been unequivocally placed in a tribe and the genus list is thus preliminary, it is not very likely that many other genera will end up being assigned here.

== Genera ==
- Alesa Doubleday, 1847
- Eurybia [Illiger], 1807
