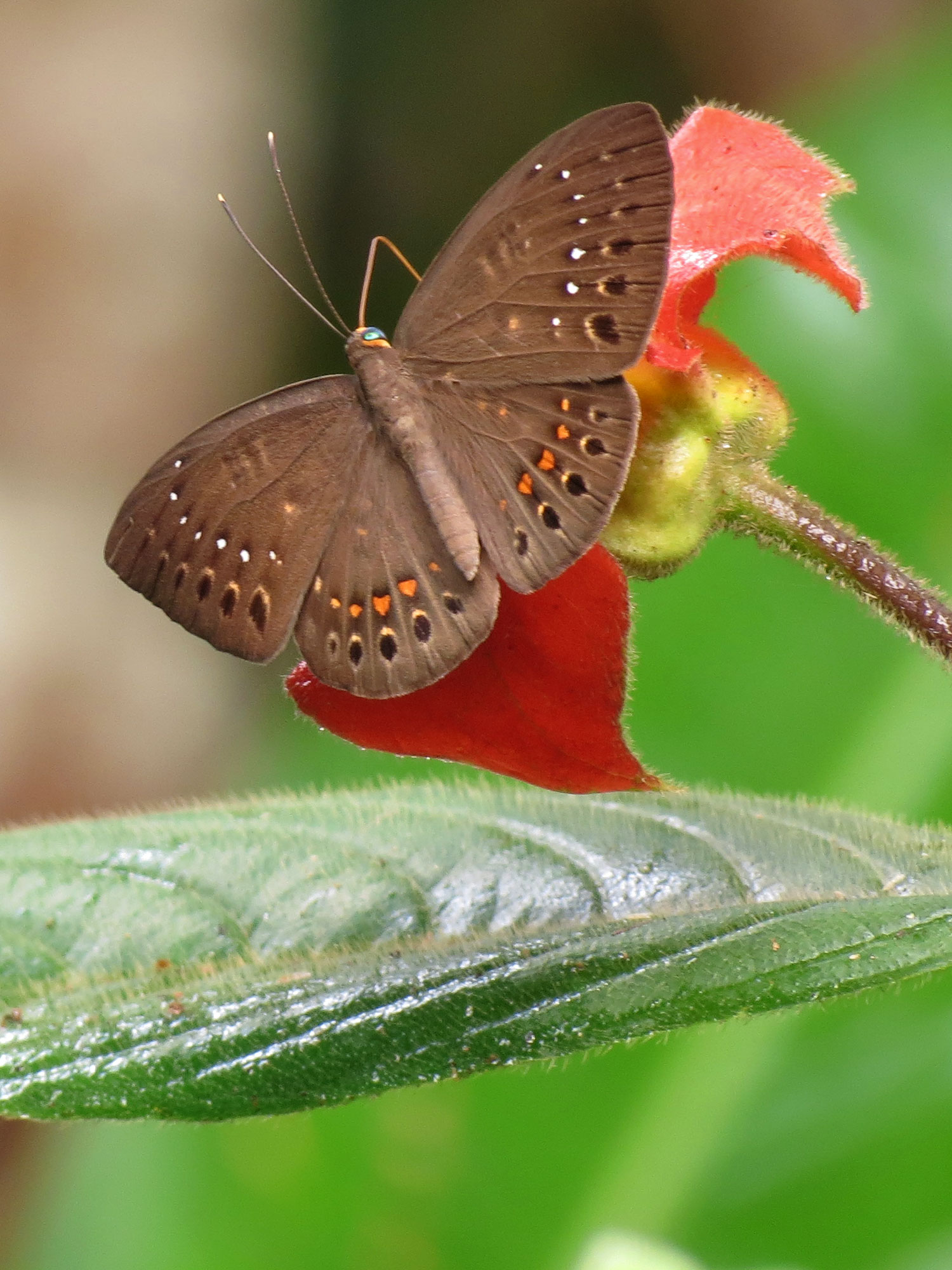

Scientific classification
- Kingdom: Animalia
- Phylum: Arthropoda
- Clade: Pancrustacea
- Class: Insecta
- Order: Lepidoptera
- Family: Riodinidae
- Genus: Eurybia
- Species: E. elvina

Binomial name
- Eurybia elvina Stichel, 1910

= Eurybia elvina =

Species of butterfly

Eurybia elvina, commonly known as the blind eurybia, is a Neotropical metalmark butterfly. Like many other riodinids, the caterpillars are myrmecophilous and have tentacle nectary organs that exude a fluid similar to that produced by the host plant Calathea ovandensis. This mutualistic relationship allows ants to harvest the exudate, and in return provide protection in the form of soil shelters for larvae. The larvae communicate with the ants by vibrations produced by the movement of its head. The species was described and given its binomial name by the German lepidopterist Hans Stichel in 1910.

== Life cycle ==
As in all butterflies, E. elvina are holometabolous and have four distinct development stages: egg, larva, pupa and adult. It takes a total of 45 days for an adult to eclose from an egg.

=== Egg ===
The females lay the eggs on the upper surface of leaves, leaf petioles, or on the inflorescence of neotropical plants such as Calathea ovandensis. The eggs are not laid in a clutch, but are generally isolated. Sometimes, however, they may be found in widely spaced groups of five or fewer eggs. It takes, on average, 3 days for the first instar of larva to hatch out of the egg.

=== Larval stages ===
The butterfly goes through five distinct larval instars. The instars vary in terms of their distinct morphological structure and size differences. Characteristic of myrmecophilous riodinids, all the larval stages possess tentacle nectary organ (TNO) on the eighth abdominal segment. This organ plays an important role in the species' interactions with ants.

==== First instar ====
The first instar emerges from the egg by chewing through the micropyle. The body of the caterpillar is pale-yellow in color with a black head capsule. This coloration acts as a camouflage against the corolla of the host plant (Calathea spp.) on which the caterpillars are found. They feed on all parts of the flower and grow from a length of 1.5 mm to 4.5 mm. The dorsal setae of this instar are much longer than those of the other instars. The first instar period lasts for an average of 4.5 days.

==== Second instar ====
The second instar is similar to the first instar in its body coloration, with the exception of the head capsule, which is brownish-yellow in color. The foremost segment of the thorax is covered by a protective black shield into which the head of the caterpillar is partially retractable. The caterpillar possesses dark red segments on its mid-dorsal and lateral sides. Similar to the first instar, the second instar possesses dorsal setae that arise from the hardened cuticle (chalazae) of the caterpillar. The diet of this instar includes buds, flowers, and the developing fruits of the host plant. During this development period, the larvae grow from 4.5mm to 7mm in length. They molt to the third instar on an average of 4.2 days.

==== Third instar ====
The third instar is similar to the second instar except that it is larger in size. When freshly molted, the caterpillar is pale-cream in color, but it gradually changes to a brownish-yellow, and the dorsal bands turn maroon as the stage progresses. The dorsal chalazae may or may not be prominent (visible) in this instar. This instar feeds on the buds, flowers, and developing fruits of the host plant. It grows from a size of about 7 mm to 10 mm during this stage. This instar lasts for an average period of about 6.6 days.

==== Fourth instar ====
The body color of the fourth instar varies from a light to dark avocado green. The head is completely retractable under the black and tan prothoracic shield. The dorsal setae and chalazae are reduced. The fourth instar has a similar diet to the previous instars and grows to a length of 14 mm. This stage lasts for an average period of about 6.5 days.

==== Fifth instar ====
The final instar is very similar to the fourth instar, but is larger in size (about 20 mm). This instar possesses a similarly bicolored prothoracic shield and reduced dorsal setae. There are dense black dots found laterally along the length of the caterpillar's body during this stage. This instar is bright green in color, which mimics the color of the host plant. This stage lasts for an average period of about 11 days.

=== Pupa ===
The pupa is bright green, matching the colors of the young leaves of the host plant on which it is found. It has an incompletely extended white proboscis which resembles a tail. The proboscis eventually extends completely and changes from dark green to brown like the rest of the pupa. The adult emerges from the pupa after approximately 9.5 days.

=== Adult ===
The complete metamorphosis from the egg to the adult takes approximately 45 days. The length of the adult ranges from 18.2 – 19.6 mm. In comparison, the proboscis is long, about 33.5 – 38.5 mm, as is characteristic of the genus Eurybia. The adults drink floral nectar from the host plants. The host plants are typically members of the genus Calathea and Ischnosiphon pruniosus.

== Pollination ==
The long proboscis of the adult does not touch the stigma or the pollen of the plant while feeding on C. ovandensis. Thus, they never pollinate the host flowers. Such visits are expected to be detrimental for plant reproduction, as the loss of nectar reduces the plants' success of pollination during future visits. This may also lead to tripping of flowers with no pollen exchange, resulting in reduced fruit-set. However, it has been observed that Eurybia elvina rarely trip flowers. It was found that their ineffective pollination in the study system did not significantly reduce fruit-set. Thus, the adult interaction with the host plant is commensal.

== Mutualism with ants ==
The larval stages of E. elvina have been found in mutualistic associations with several ant species, such as the electric ant, Brachymyrmex musculus, Paratrechina spp. and fire ants among others. This type of an association is generally referred to as myrmecophily. The tentacle nectary organ (TNO) found that the eighth abdominal segment of the larval stages plays a special role in this interaction. This organ secretes exudates rich in sugars and amino acids which is harvested by the ants. This secretion has been found to be biochemically similar to the nectar produced by the host plant (C. ovandensis). The later instars of the caterpillar position themselves in the inflorescence such that the TNO is presented to the ants at roughly the same level of the nectaries of the flower. Some species of ants build soil shelters around the later instars on the inflorescences. The pupal stages were also attended by ants even though they produce no exudates. It is thought that the association with ants may protect the caterpillar from enemies.

== Physiology ==
=== Sound production ===
A number of riodinid species are known to produce audible signals using epicranial granulations. An experiment to see if this behavior exists in E. elvina was conducted in Soberania National Park, Panama using E. elvina caterpillars and the ant species Ectatomma ruidum. The caterpillar was observed producing 12–15 pulses of sound per second when walking and foraging, either when alone or when accompanied by E. ruidum ants. As they produced sound, the caterpillars oscillated their head laterally, and the sound stopped when the oscillations ceased or when the head region was not in contact with the substrate (branch). The investigators of the experiment were able to discern that E. elvina caterpillars produce sound by oscillating their head in order to scrape the teeth that cover their cervical membrane against the epicranial granulations located on the surface of their heads.
