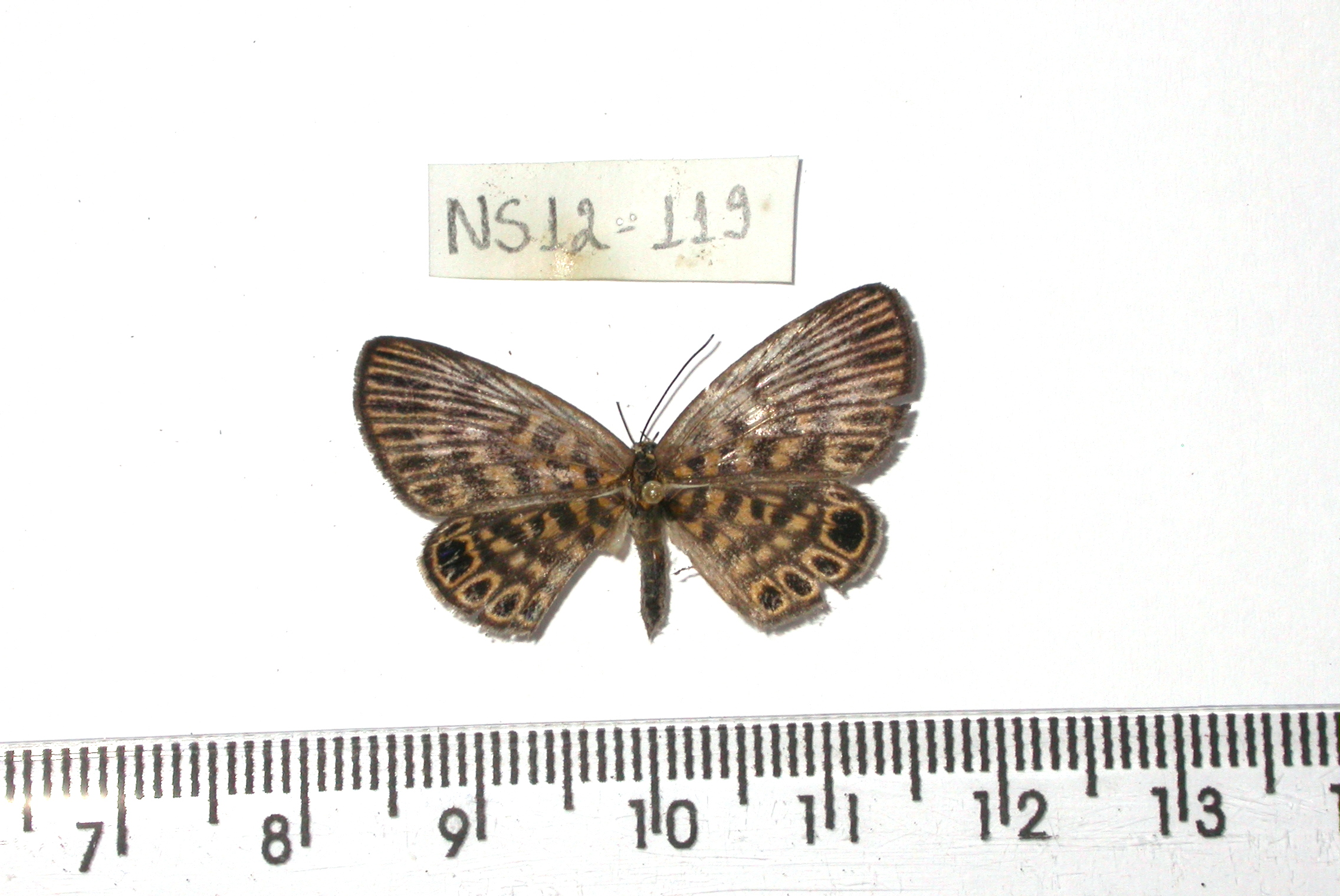

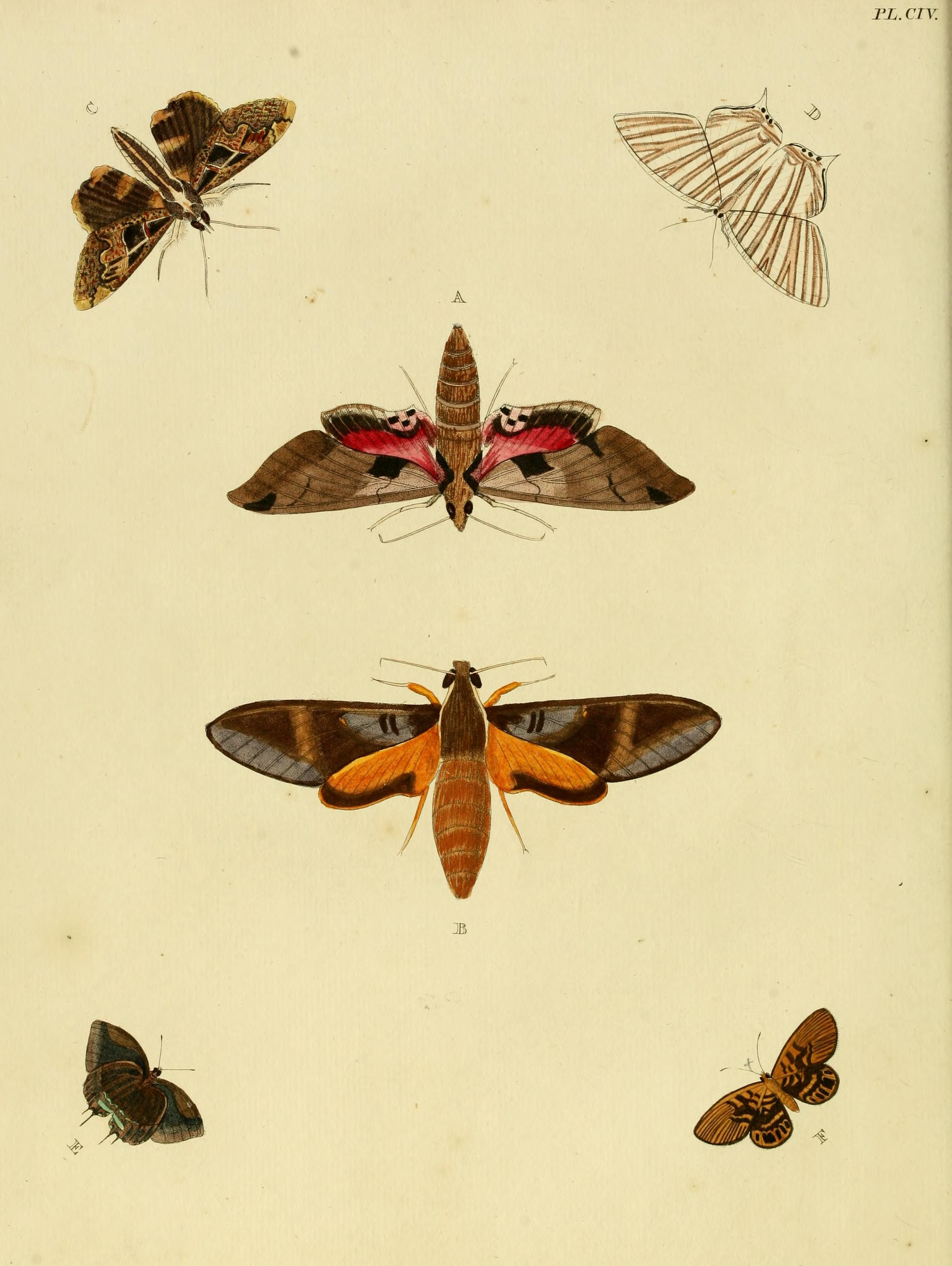
- Plate accompanying the original description- an iconotype

Scientific classification
- Kingdom: Animalia
- Phylum: Arthropoda
- Class: Insecta
- Order: Lepidoptera
- Family: Riodinidae
- Genus: Alesa
- Species: A. amesis

Binomial name
- Alesa amesis (Cramer, 1777)

= Alesa amesis =

Species of butterfly

Alesa amesis described by Pieter Cramer in 1777 is a butterfly of the family Riodinidae. It is found in the Guianas, Brazil, Venezuela, Colombia, Ecuador and Peru

== Description ==
A. amesis Cr. (= amosis auct., priolas Godt.) (127 b). male above black, in the apical part of the forewing with yellowish grey streaks; from the distal margin of all the wings, a violettish blue reflection extends variously far into the wing, being prominent only in certain exposure to light, so that the reflection is much more difficult to see than, for instance, in the quite similarly coloured Euselasia tarinta; in some specimens the reflection seems to be absent altogether. Female light brown with dark bands. Apex of the forewing with yellow streaks, before the margin of the hindwing yellow, black-pupilled eye-spots the apical one of which represents a fused double eye-spot. images

== Biology ==
The larva preys on Membracidae.
