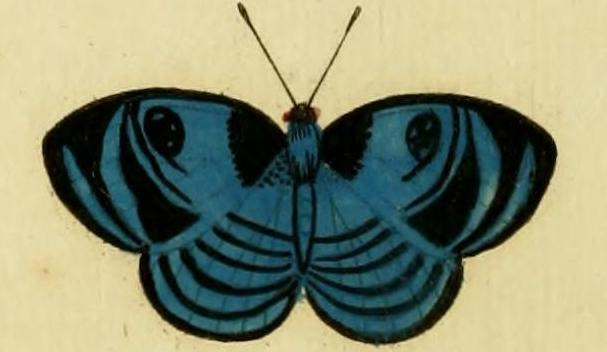

Scientific classification
- Domain: Eukaryota
- Kingdom: Animalia
- Phylum: Arthropoda
- Class: Insecta
- Order: Lepidoptera
- Family: Riodinidae
- Genus: Semomesia
- Species: S. capanea

Binomial name
- Semomesia capanea (Cramer, 1779)

Synonyms
- Papilio capanea Cramer, 1779; Mesosemia generis Doubleday, 1847; Mesosemia formosa Westwood, 1851; Mesosemia maria Butler, 1877; Semomesia capanea ionima f. turgida Stichel, 1919

= Semomesia capanea =

Species of butterfly

Semomesia capanea is a species of butterfly of the family Riodinidae. It is found in South America.

== Subspecies ==
- Semomesia capanea capanea (Surinam, French Guiana, Brazil: Pará)
- Semomesia capanea ionima Stichel, 1910 (Brazil: Amazonas)
- Semomesia capanea sodalis Stichel, 1919 (Peru)
