= Hermathena eburna =

Scientific classification
- Domain: Eukaryota
- Kingdom: Animalia
- Phylum: Arthropoda
- Class: Insecta
- Order: Lepidoptera
- Family: Riodinidae
- Subfamily: Riodininae
- Tribe: Mesosemiini
- Genus: Hermathena
- Species: H. eburna

Binomial name
- Hermathena eburna J. Hall & Harvey, 2005

Species of butterfly

Hermathena eburna is a species of butterfly in genus Hermathena of the family Riodinidae. This montane forest species is found from Costa Rica to western Ecuador.
