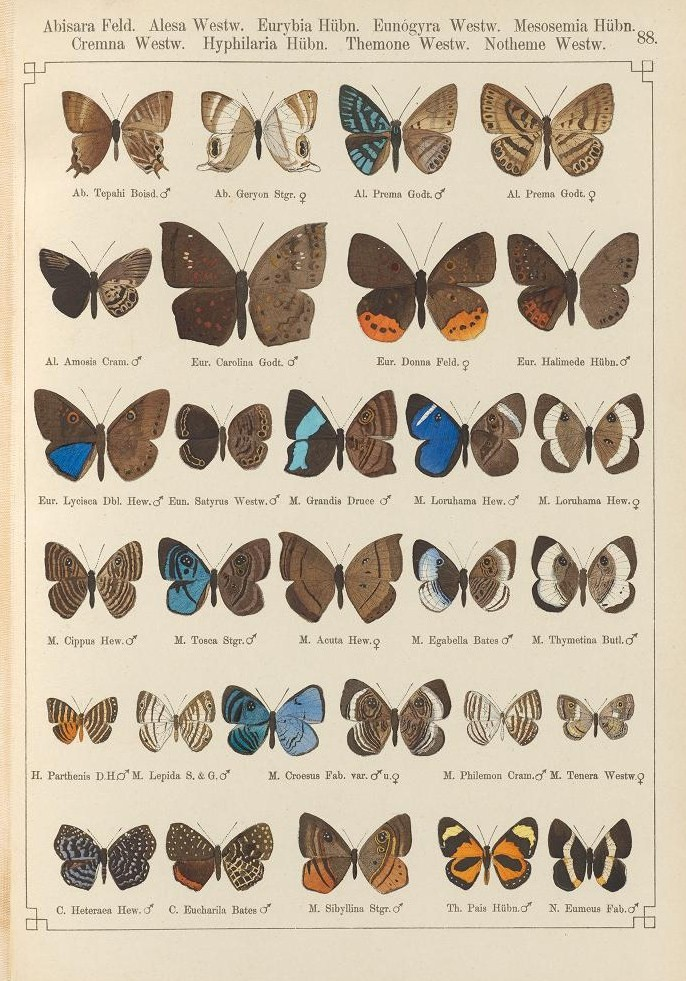
- Alesa and other Riodininidae

Scientific classification
- Domain: Eukaryota
- Kingdom: Animalia
- Phylum: Arthropoda
- Class: Insecta
- Order: Lepidoptera
- Family: Riodinidae
- Tribe: Eurybiini
- Genus: Alesa; Doubleday, 1847

Species
- See text

Synonyms
- Mimocastnia Seitz, [1917]

= Alesa =

Genus of butterflies

Alesa is a New World (Neotropical realm) genus of metalmark butterflies found in northern South America.

This genus is distinguished by a vast sexual dimorphism receding somewhat only in one species. The body is slender, the head is broad and slanting, with a flat forehead and closely appressed (flattened) short palpi. The antennae are very long, only slightly thickened at their ends. The abdomen is long, in the male thin, in the female stout, but likewise stretched. The forewings are long with a very oblique distal margin. The hindwings are round, especially in the female. Cells of all the wings closed, the upper radial originates with the 3rd subcostal vein from the same place. Colouring of the females is earthy brown, that of the males varying, but with a metallic lustre.

== Species ==
Listed alphabetically:

- Alesa amesis (Cramer, 1777) – Amesis metalmark – present in French Guiana, Ecuador, Guyana, Colombia, Venezuela, Brazil and Peru.
- Alesa fournierae Lathy, 1958 present in Brazil.
- Alesa hemiurga Bates, 1867 – hemiurga metalmark – present in Brazil.
- Alesa lipara Bates, 1867 – Lipara metalmark – present in Brazil.
- Alesa prema (Godart, [1824]) – Prema metalmark – present in Colombia, Venezuela and Trinidad and Tobago. Male of a magnificent emerald green, in another light of a deep blue reflection, with black markings. Female similar to A. telephae, larger, the eyespots of the hindwings and some spots near the base of the forewing with metallic pupils.
- Alesa rothschildi (Seitz, [1917]) present in French Guiana and Guyana. Male above with a black lattice-like marking, with golden-green spots, the marginal spots guttiform (shaped like a drop). Female above black except the distal half of the forewing in which there is a white oblique band, and the margin of the hindwing of a blue gloss.
- Alesa telephae (Boisduval, 1836) – Telephae metalmark – present in French Guiana and Brazil.
- Alesa thelydrias Bates, 1867 present in Brazil.
