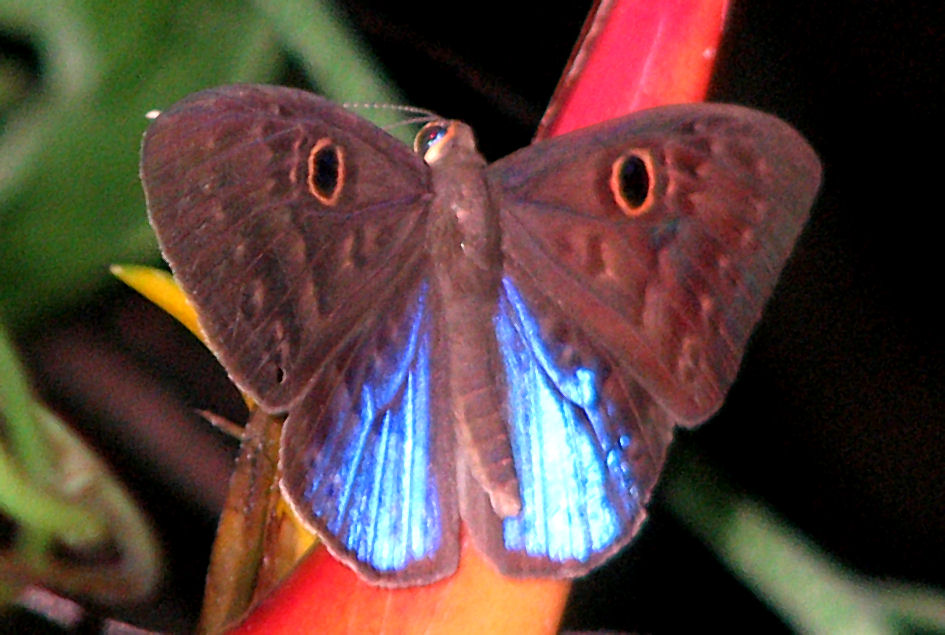

Scientific classification
- Domain: Eukaryota
- Kingdom: Animalia
- Phylum: Arthropoda
- Class: Insecta
- Order: Lepidoptera
- Family: Riodinidae
- Genus: Eurybia
- Species: E. lycisca

Binomial name
- Eurybia lycisca Westwood, 1851

Synonyms
- Eurybia lamia Cramer, 1777 (preocc. Sulzer, 1776); Eurybia lamia lamia f. lauta Stichel, 1910; Eurybia caerulescens palikourea Brévignon, 1997

= Eurybia lycisca =

Species of butterfly

Eurybia lycisca, the blue-winged eurybia, is a butterfly of the family Riodinidae. It is found in from Mexico to Ecuador, including some Caribbean islands. The Eurybia lycisca is a nectar feeding butterfly that utilizes the Calathea flowers as a food source.

Larvae feed on Calathea lutea, C. crotalifera, C. inocephala, C. latifolia, C. warsczewisczia, and Ischnosiphon pruniosus. They also use the Calathea as a host plant.
