= Hermathena oweni =

Scientific classification
- Domain: Eukaryota
- Kingdom: Animalia
- Phylum: Arthropoda
- Class: Insecta
- Order: Lepidoptera
- Family: Riodinidae
- Subfamily: Riodininae
- Tribe: Mesosemiini
- Genus: Hermathena
- Species: H. oweni

Binomial name
- Hermathena oweni Schaus, 1913

Synonyms
- Hermathena dativa (Schaus, 1928)

Species of butterfly

Hermathena oweni, the peppered metalmark, is a species of butterfly in genus Hermathena of the family Riodinidae. It was first described by William Schaus in 1913. This rare montane forest species is found from southern Mexico to Costa Rica.
