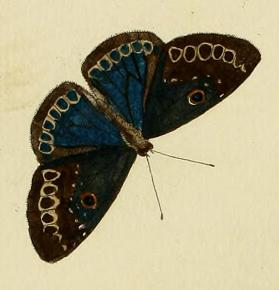

Scientific classification
- Kingdom: Animalia
- Phylum: Arthropoda
- Class: Insecta
- Order: Lepidoptera
- Family: Riodinidae
- Genus: Eurybia
- Species: E. franciscana

Binomial name
- Eurybia franciscana C. & R. Felder, 1862

Synonyms
- Eurybia lamia Cramer, 1777 (preocc. Sulzer, 1776); Eurybia lamia lamia f. lauta Stichel, 1910; Eurybia caerulescens palikourea Brévignon, 1997

= Eurybia franciscana =

Species of butterfly

Eurybia franciscana is a butterfly of the family Riodinidae. It is found in Central and most of South America, including Peru, Suriname, and Ecuador.

The wingspan is 45–47 mm.
