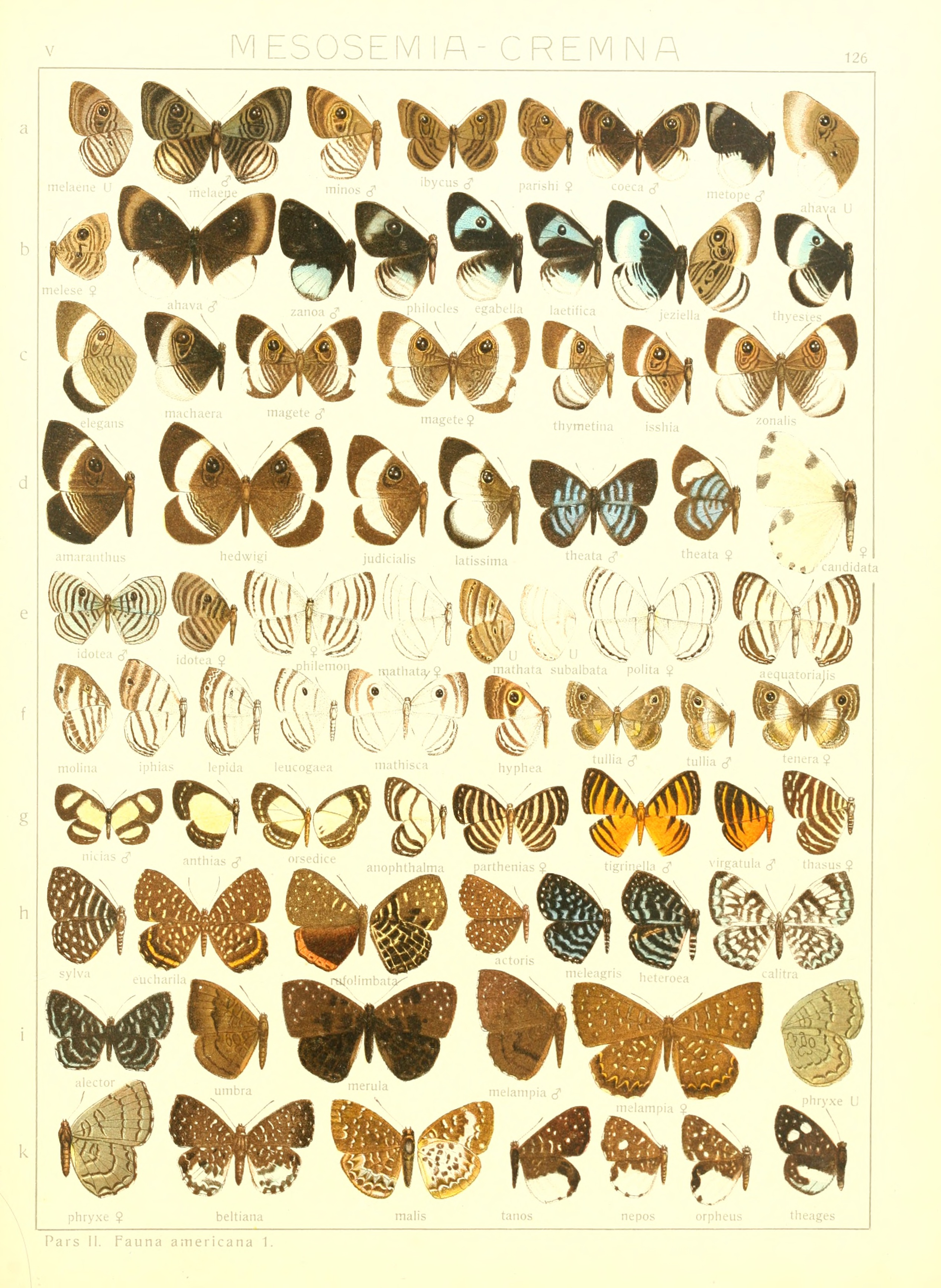

Scientific classification
- Kingdom: Animalia
- Phylum: Arthropoda
- Class: Insecta
- Order: Lepidoptera
- Family: Riodinidae
- Subfamily: Riodininae
- Tribe: Mesosemiini
- Genus: Voltinia; Stichel, 1910

Synonyms
- Eucora Schaus, 1902 (non Hübner, [1823]: preoccupied); Eucorna Strand, 1932

= Voltinia (butterfly) =

Genus of butterflies

Voltinia is a genus of metalmark butterflies (family Riodinidae). The genus was erected by Hans Ferdinand Emil Julius Stichel in 1910. Even including Eucorna, which some authors consider a distinct genus, it contains only a few species:

- †Voltinia dramba Hall, Robbins & Harvey 2004 (fossil)
- Voltinia radiata (Godman & Salvin, [1886])
- Voltinia sanarita (Schaus, 1902)
- Voltinia theata Stichel, 1910
