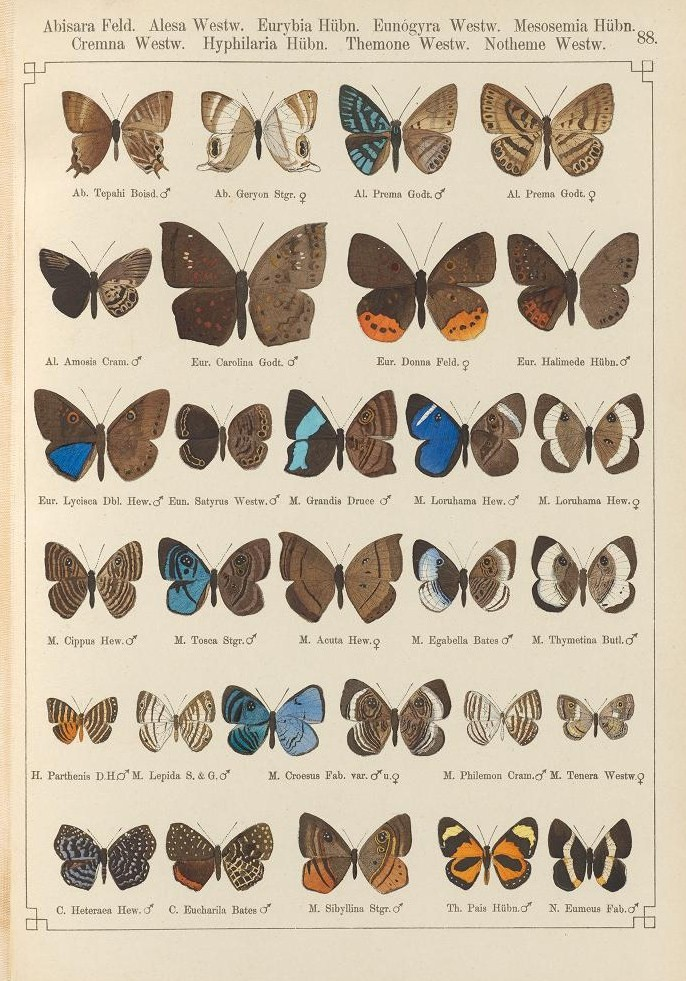
- Plate illustrating Mesosemia and Napaea see plate text

Scientific classification
- Kingdom: Animalia
- Phylum: Arthropoda
- Clade: Pancrustacea
- Class: Insecta
- Order: Lepidoptera
- Family: Riodinidae
- Subfamily: Riodininae
- Tribe: Mesosemiini; Bates, 1859

Subtribes
- Mesosemiina Hall, 2003; Napaeina Hall, 2003; For genera, see text

= Mesosemiini =

Tribe of butterflies

The Mesosemiini are one of the tribes of metalmark butterflies (family Riodinidae). They are the basalmost living tribe of the Riodininae, outside the main radiation together with the slightly more advanced Eurybiini.

== Genera ==
As numerous Riodinidae genera have not yet been unequivocally assigned to a tribe, the genus list is preliminary.

In each subtribe, the genera are arranged in phylogenetic sequence, from the most plesiomorphic to the most apomorphic.

Subtribe Mesosemiina

- Eunogyra
- Teratophthalma
- Mesosemia
- Leucochimona
- Semomesia
- Mesophthalma
- Perophthalma

Subtribe Napaeina

- Hyphilaria
- Napaea - includes Cremna
- Voltinia - includes Eucorna
- Ionotus - formerly in Cremna
- Hermathena
- Ithomiola

== Some notable Mesosemiini species from the Amazon ==
Mesosemiina

- Mesophthalma idotea Westwood, 1851
- Mesosemia anthaerice (Hewitson, 1859)
- Mesosemia asa
- Mesosemia calypso
- Mesosemia cippus
- Mesosemia coea (Hübner, 1819)
- Mesosemia eumene
- Mesosemia euphyne (Cramer, 1777)
- Mesosemia hyphaea
- Mesosemia ibycus (Hewitson, 1859)
  - Mesosemia ibycus parishi
- Mesosemia macella Hewitson, 1859
- Mesosemia magete
- Mesosemia melaene
- Mesosemia melese Hewitson, 1860
- Mesosemia melpia
- Mesosemia messeis
- Mesosemia methion
- Mesosemia metope
- Mesosemia minos
- Mesosemia philocles (Linnaeus, 1758)
- Mesosemia sifia
- Mesosemia steli (Hewitson, 1857)
- Mesosemia tenura
- Mesosemia thymetina
- Mesosemia ulrica
- Perophthalma tullius (Fabricius, 1782)

Napaeina

- Hyphilaria anophthalma
- Hyphilaria parthensis (Westwood, 1851)
- Hyphilaria thasus
- Napaea actoris (Cramer, 1776)
- Napaea eucharila (Bates, 1867)
- Napaea nepos
