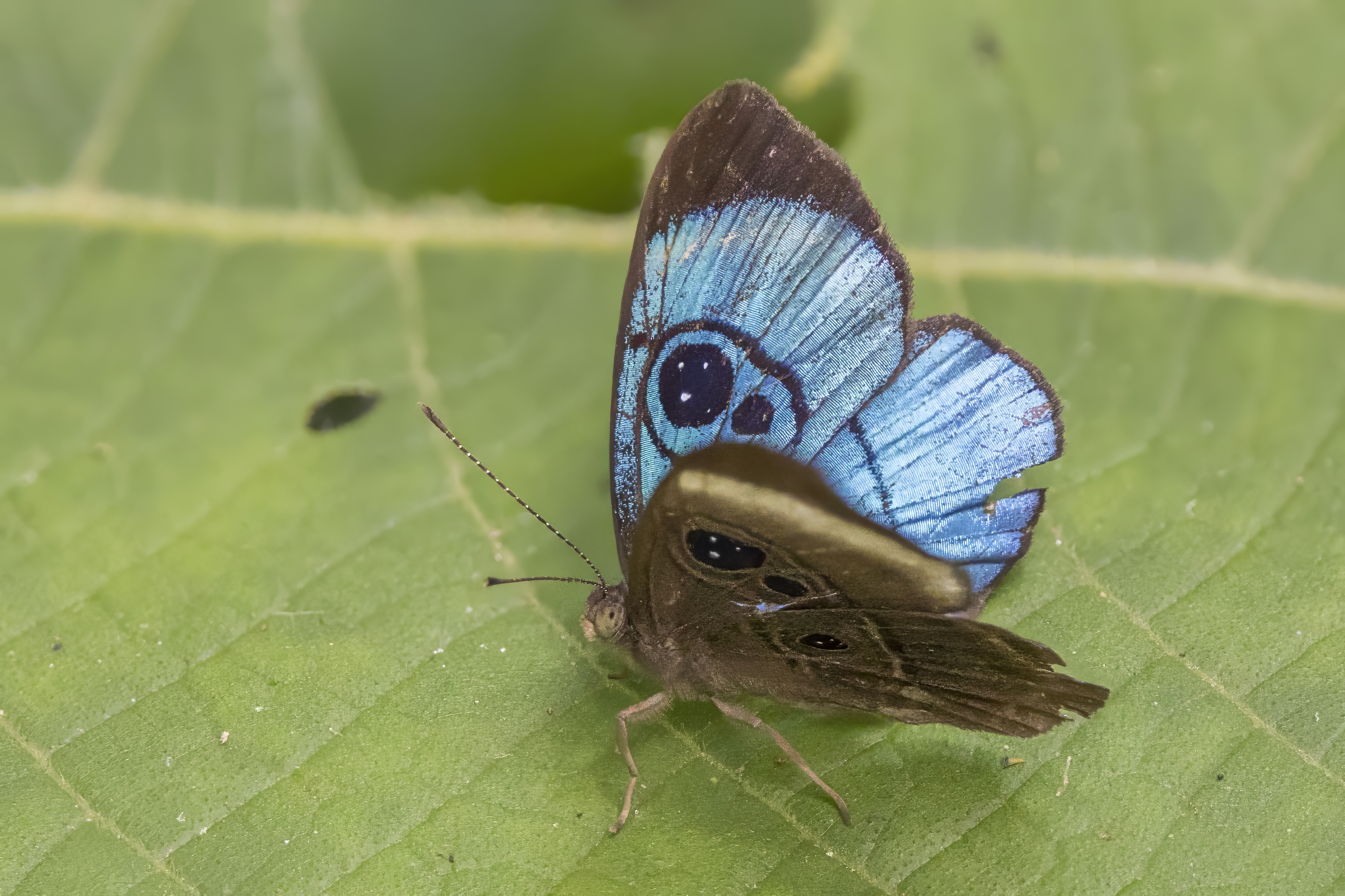
- Mesosemia loruhama male Sucumbios, Ecuador

Scientific classification
- Kingdom: Animalia
- Phylum: Arthropoda
- Clade: Pancrustacea
- Class: Insecta
- Order: Lepidoptera
- Family: Riodinidae
- Subfamily: Riodininae
- Genus: Mesosemia; Hübner, 1819

Synonyms
- Diophtalma Boisduval, [1836]

= Mesosemia =

Genus of butterflies

Mesosemia is a genus in the butterfly family Riodinidae present only in the Neotropical realm.

This genus rather closely approximates the genus Eurybia, though it is by no means so uniform. Also here there is in most of the species almost exactly above the middle of the forewing a large eyespot which often exhibits two or three white pupils, and where it is absent, one mostly finds yet its traces in the shape of a small central shade or minute cloud. The Mesosemia differ from the Eurybia by their smaller heads, the shorter antennae, the borders of the forewings being generally slightly curved, the short abdomen mostly not reaching as far as the anal angle, the longer hindwings being often geniculate (knee like) in the middle of the distal margin, or angularly protended (held out). The row of distal marginal spots of the hindwing is always absent, the hindwings, however, show in the disk more or less parallel transverse stripes. The sexual dimorphism, which is not noticed in Eurybia is here the rule and mostly very much pronounced. The butterflies are often met with on blossoms, still oftener on leaves, but they seem to rest much on their under surface in order to come forth only for a short time for the sake of copulation and feeding. Then they perform jerky movements on the leaves, stretching the antennae straight forward, placing the hindwings flat on the leaf and slightly raising the forewings. In this manner they hasten from one leaf to another, from one branch to another, more jumping than flying, as Fassl expresses himself. The butterflies are partly extremely local and some of them are very rare.

== Species ==
- Mesosemia ackeryi Brévignon, 1997 present in French Guiana
- Mesosemia acuta Hewitson, 1873 present in Brazil
- Mesosemia adida Hewitson, 1869 present in Ecuador
- Mesosemia ahava Hewitson, 1869 present in Ecuador, Bolivia and Peru
- Mesosemia albipuncta Schaus, 1913 present in Costa Rica and Panama
- Mesosemia amarantus Stichel, 1910 present in Peru
- Mesosemia anceps Stichel, 1915 present in Ecuador
- Mesosemia antaerice Hewitson, 1859 present in French Guiana, Guyana, Suriname, Trinidad and Tobago, Ecuador and Brazil
- Mesosemia araeostyla Stichel, 1915 present in Guyana
- Mesosemia asa Hewitson, 1869 present in Costa Rica, Nicaragua, Panama, Ecuador and Colombia
- Mesosemia bahia Callaghan, 1999 present in Brazil
- Mesosemia bella Sharpe, 1890 present in Brazil
- Mesosemia carderi Druce, 1904 present in Colombia
- Mesosemia carissima Bates, 1866 present in Costa Rica and Panama
- Mesosemia ceropia Druce, 1874 present in Costa Rica and Colombia
- Mesosemia coelestis Godman & Salvin, [1885] present in Costa Rica and Colombia
- Mesosemia cordillerrensis Salazar & Constantino, 1993 present in Colombia
- Mesosemia cyanira Stichel, 1909 present in Ecuador
- Mesosemia cippus Hewitson, 1859 present in Brazil
- Mesosemia cymotaxis Stichel, 1910 present in Brazil
- Mesosemia decolorata Lathy, 1932 present in Brazil and French Guiana
- Mesosemia dulcis Stichel, 1910 present in Brazil
- Mesosemia ephyne (Cramer, 1776) present in French Guiana, French Guiana, Suriname, Peru and Brazil
- Mesosemia epidius Hewitson, 1859 present in French Guiana
- Mesosemia erinnya Stichel, 1910 Ecuador and Peru.
- Mesosemia esmeralda Gallard & Brévignon, 1989 present in French Guiana
- Mesosemia esperanza Schaus, 1913 present in Costa Rica and Panama
- Mesosemia eugenea Stichel, 1910 present in Suriname and Brazil
- Mesosemia eumene (Cramer, 1776) present in French Guiana, French Guiana, Suriname, Ecuador, Bolivia Peru and Brazil
- Mesosemia eurythmia Stichel, 1915 present in Brazil
- Mesosemia evias Stichel, 1923 present in Brazil
- Mesosemia friburgensis Schaus, 1902 present in Brazil
- Mesosemia gaudiolum Bates, 1865 Mexico, Nicaragua and Guatemala
- Mesosemia gemina J. & R. G. Maza, 1980 present in Mexico
- Mesosemia gertraudis Stichel, 1910 present in Peru
- Mesosemia gneris Westwood, 1851 present in Suriname, Peru and Brazil
- Mesosemia grandis Druce, 1874 present in Costa Rica and Panama
- Mesosemia harveyi DeVries & Hall, 1996 present in Costa Rica and Panama
- Mesosemia hedwigis Stichel, 1910 present in Peru and Bolivia
- Mesosemia hesperina Butler, 1874 present in Costa Rica, Nicaragua, Venezuela and Brazil
- Mesosemia hypermegala Stichel, 1909 present in Costa Rica and Colombia
- Mesosemia jucunda Stichel, 1923 present in Brazil
- Mesosemia ibycus Hewitson, 1859
- Mesosemia impedita Stichel, 1909 present in Brazil
- Mesosemia inconspicua Lathy, 1932 present in French Guiana
- Mesosemia isshia Butler, 1869 present in Colombia
- Mesosemia judicialis Butler, 1874 present in Brazil, Bolivia and Peru.
- Mesosemia kwokii D'Abrera, 1860 present in Colombia
- Mesosemia lacernata Stichel, 1909 present in Suriname
- Mesosemia lamachus Hewitson, 1857 present in Mexico, Honduras, Costa Rica, Guatemala and Colombia
- Mesosemia lapillus Stichel, 1910 present in Peru
- Mesosemia latizonata Butler, 1874 present in Ecuador
- Mesosemia loruhama Hewitson, 1869 present in Ecuador, Colombia, Bolivia and Peru.
- Mesosemia luperca Stichel, 1910 present in Peru
- Mesosemia lycorias Stichel, 1915 present in Brazil
- Mesosemia macella Hewitson, 1859 present in Brazil
- Mesosemia machaera Hewitson, 1860 present in Ecuador, Brazil and Colombia
- Mesosemia macrina (C. & R. Felder, 1865) present in Ecuador and Colombia
- Mesosemia maeotis Hewitson, 1859 present in Brazil
- Mesosemia magete Hewitson, 1860 present in Suriname and Brazil
- Mesosemia mamilia Hewitson, 1870 present in Ecuador
- Mesosemia mancia Hewitson, 1870 present in Ecuador
- Mesosemia mathania Schaus, 1902 present in Peru
- Mesosemia mayi Lathy, 1958 present in Brazil
- Mesosemia meeda Hewitson, 1858 present in Brazil
- Mesosemia melaene Hewitson, 1859 present in Brazil French Guiana
- Mesosemia melese Hewitson, 1860 present in Brazil
- Mesosemia melpia Hewitson, 1859 present in Brazil
- Mesosemia menoetes Hewitson, 1859 present in French Guiana, Bolivia, Peru and Brazil
- Mesosemia messeis Hewitson, 1860 present in Ecuador, Brazil, Bolivia and Peru
- Mesosemia mesoba Hewitson, [1873] present in Ecuador
- Mesosemia methion Hewitson, 1860 present in Brazil and Trinidad and Tobago
- Mesosemia metope Hewitson, 1859 present in French Guiana, Guyana, Peru and Brazil
- Mesosemia mehida Hewitson, 1869 present in Ecuador
- Mesosemia mevania Hewitson, [1857] present in Ecuador, Peru and Colombia
- Mesosemia metuana (C. & R. Felder, 1865) present in Ecuador, Colombia and Bolivia
- Mesosemia metura Hewitson, [1873] present in Peru
- Mesosemia minos Hewitson, 1859 present in Suriname and Brazil
- Mesosemia minutula Gallard, 1996 present in French Guiana
- Mesosemia misipsa Hewitson, 1859 Brazil
- Mesosemia modulata Stichel, 1910 present in Peru
- Mesosemia moesia Hewitson, [1857] present in Brazil
- Mesosemia mosera Hewitson, 1860 present in Brazil
- Mesosemia myonia Hewitson, 1859 present in Brazil
- Mesosemia myrmecias Stichel, 1910 present in French Guiana, Guyana, Peru and Bolivia
- Mesosemia naiadella Stichel, 1909 present in French Guiana, Guyana, Suriname, Ecuador, Peru and Brazil
- Mesosemia nerine Stichel, 1909 present in Bolivia
- Mesosemia nyctea (Hoffmannsegg, 1818) present in Suriname and Brazil
- Mesosemia nympharena Stichel, 1909 present in French Guiana
- Mesosemia odice (Godart, [1824]) present in Brazil and Argentina
- Mesosemia olivencia Bates, 1868 present in Peru and Brazil
- Mesosemia orbona Godman, 1903 present in French Guiana, Guyana, Suriname and Colombia
- Mesosemia ozora Hewitson, 1869 present in Ecuador
- Mesosemia pacifica Stichel, 1926 present in Colombia
- Mesosemia pardalis Callaghan, 2001 present in Brazil
- Mesosemia phace Godman, 1903 present in Guyana
- Mesosemia philocles (Linnaeus, 1758) present in Suriname and Brazil
- Mesosemia praeculta Stichel, 1910 present in Bolivia
- Mesosemia putli Seitz, 1913 present in Peru
- Mesosemia reba Hewitson, 1869 present in Ecuador
- Mesosemia rhodia (Godart, [1824] present in Brazil)
- Mesosemia scotina Stichel, 1909 present in Suriname
- Mesosemia sibyllina Staudinger, [1887] present in Ecuador and Colombia
- Mesosemia sifia (Boisduval, 1836) present in French Guiana, Guyana, Ecuador and Colombia
- Mesosemia sirenia Stichel, 1909 present in Brazil, Bolivia and Peru
- Mesosemia steli Hewitson, 1858 present in Brazil
- Mesosemia subtilis Stichel, 1909 present in Bolivia and Peru
- Mesosemia synnephis Stichel, 1909 present in Brazil
- Mesosemia telegone (Boisduval, [1836]) present in Mexico, Costa Rica, Venezuela, Ecuador and Colombia
- Mesosemia tenebricosa Hewitson, 1877 present in Brazil, Ecuador and Peru
- Mesosemia teulem Brévignon, 1995 present in French Guiana
- Mesosemia thera Godman, 1903 present in Brazil
- Mesosemia thetys Godman & Salvin, [1885] present in Colombia
- Mesosemia thyas Stichel, 1910 present in Brazil
- Mesosemia thymetus (Cramer, 1777) present in Suriname and Colombia
- Mesosemia ulrica (Cramer, 1777) present in Suriname, Ecuador and Peru
- Mesosemia veneris Butler, 1871 present in Brazil
- Mesosemia zanoa Hewitson, 1869 present in Ecuador and Colombia
- Mesosemia zikla Hewitson, 1869 present in Ecuador
- Mesosemia zonalis Godman & Salvin, [1885] present in Honduras and Panama
- Mesosemia zorea Hewitson, 1869 present in Ecuador, Colombia and Peru
- Mesosemia walteri Brévignon, 1998 present in French Guiana

=== Sources ===
- funet

=== External links ===
- Mesosemia at Butterflies of America
