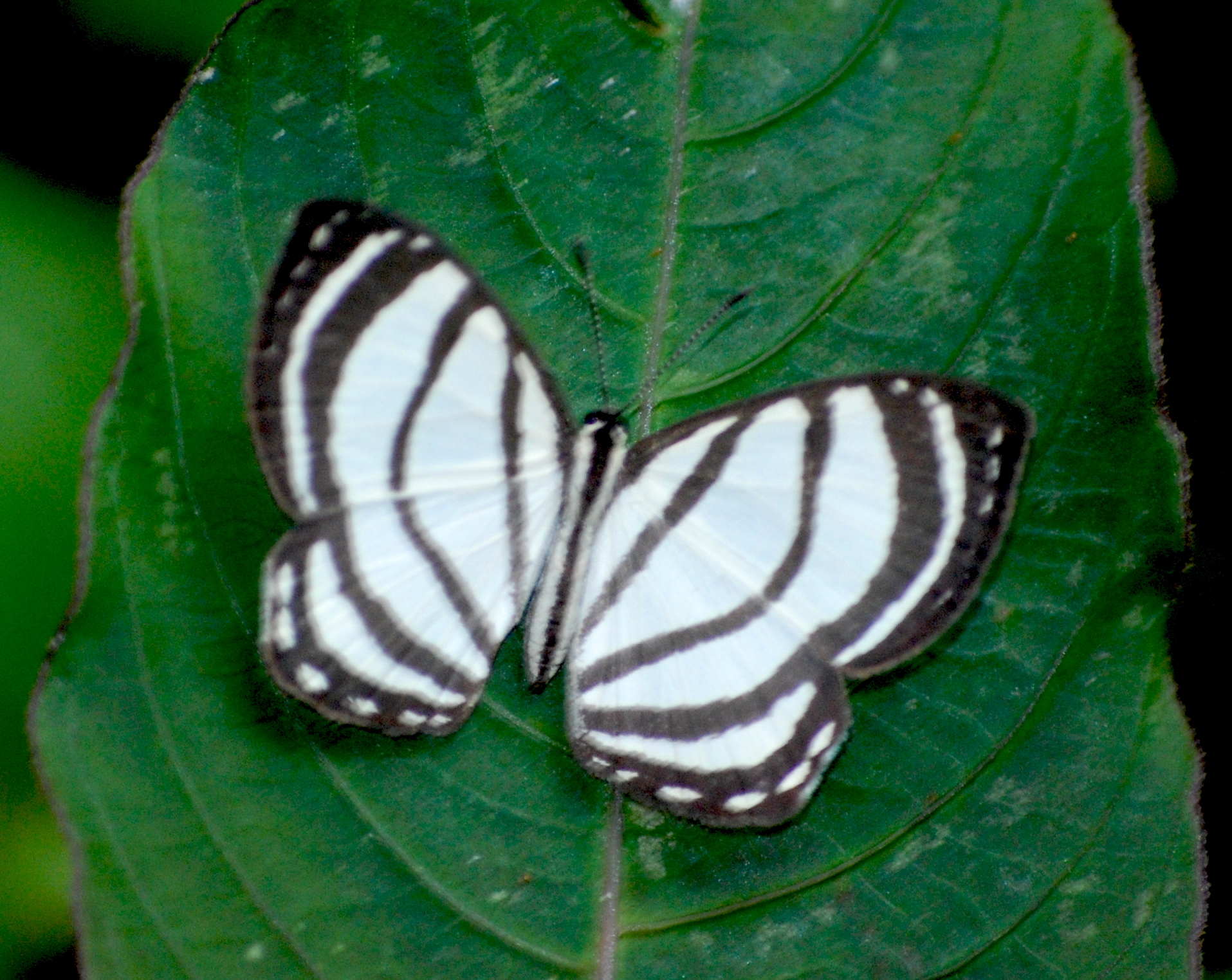
- Leucochimona anophthalma

Scientific classification
- Kingdom: Animalia
- Phylum: Arthropoda
- Clade: Pancrustacea
- Class: Insecta
- Order: Lepidoptera
- Family: Riodinidae
- Subfamily: Riodininae
- Genus: Leucochimona; Stichel, 1909

= Leucochimona =

Genus of butterflies

Leucochimona is a genus of butterflies in the family Riodinidae. Species of the genus are found only in the Neotropical realm.

== Species ==
- Leucochimona aequatorialis (Seitz, 1913) present in Ecuador
- Leucochimona icare (Hübner, [1819]) present in French Guiana, Guyana, Suriname, Colombia, Bolivia and Brazil
- Leucochimona hyphea (Cramer, 1776) present in Guyana and Peru
- Leucochimona iphias Stichel, 1909 present in Panama
- Leucochimona lagora (Herrich-Schäffer, [1853]) present in Panama, Nicaragua, French Guiana, Guyana, Suriname, Ecuador, Colombia and Brazil
- Leucochimona lepida (Godman & Salvin, [1885]) present in Nicaragua, Guatemala and Panama
- Leucochimona matisca (Hewitson, 1860) present in Brazil, Bolivia and Peru
- Leucochimona molina (Godman & Salvin, [1885]) present in Nicaragua, Costa Rica and Panama
- Leucochimona vestalis (Bates, 1865) present in Ecuador, Nicaragua, Guatemala and Panama

=== Sources ===
- Leucochimona at funet

=== External links ===
- Leucochimona at Butterflies of America
