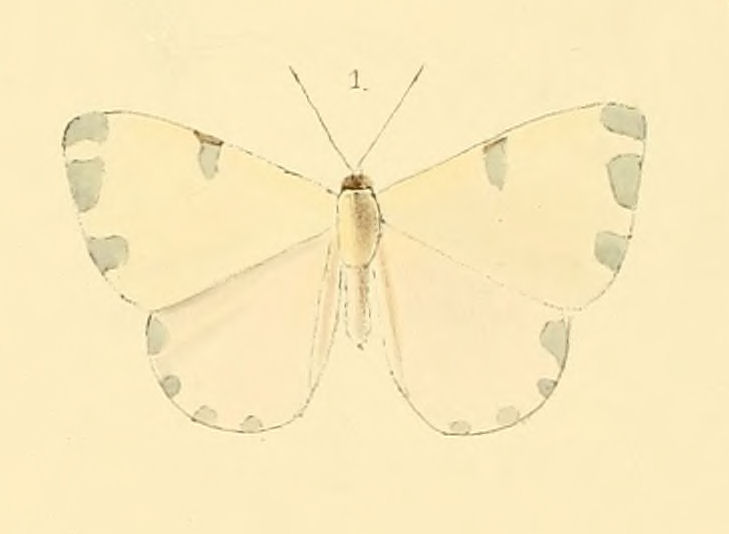
- Hermathena candidata

Scientific classification
- Kingdom: Animalia
- Phylum: Arthropoda
- Clade: Pancrustacea
- Class: Insecta
- Order: Lepidoptera
- Family: Riodinidae
- Subfamily: Riodininae
- Tribe: Mesosemiini
- Genus: Hermathena; Hewitson, 1874

= Hermathena (butterfly) =

Genus of butterflies

Hermathena is a genus of butterflies in the family Riodinidae containing a total of three known species. A small Neotropical genus of uncommon montane butterflies. The larvae feed on bromeliads.

== Species ==
- Hermathena candidata Hewitson, 1874
- Hermathena eburna Hall & Harvey, 2005
- Hermathena oweni Schaus, 1913
