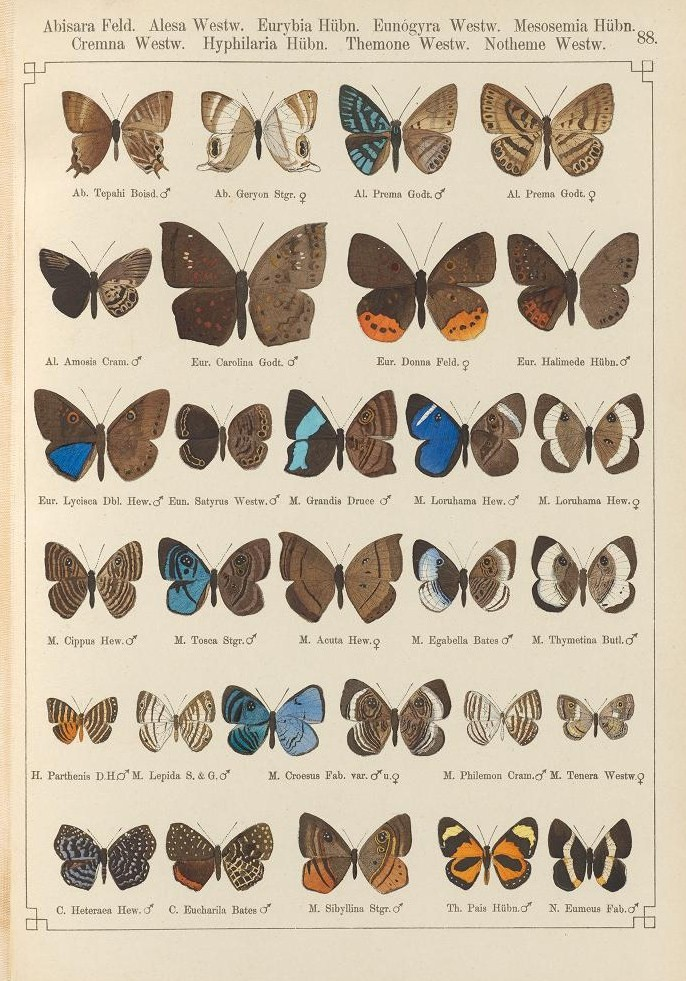
- Semomesia croesus as Mesosemia croesus

Scientific classification
- Kingdom: Animalia
- Phylum: Arthropoda
- Class: Insecta
- Order: Lepidoptera
- Family: Riodinidae
- Genus: Semomesia; Westwood, 1851

Species
- See text

= Semomesia =

Genus of butterflies

Semomesia is a genus of metalmark butterflies.

== Species ==
- Semomesia alyattes Zikán, 1952
- Semomesia capanea (Cramer, 1779)
- Semomesia croesus (Fabricius, 1777)
- Semomesia geminus (Fabricius, 1793)
- Semomesia macaris (Hewitson, 1859)
- Semomesia marisa Marisa eyemark (Hewitson, 1858)
- Semomesia nesti (Hewitson, 1858)
- Semomesia tenella Stichel, 1910

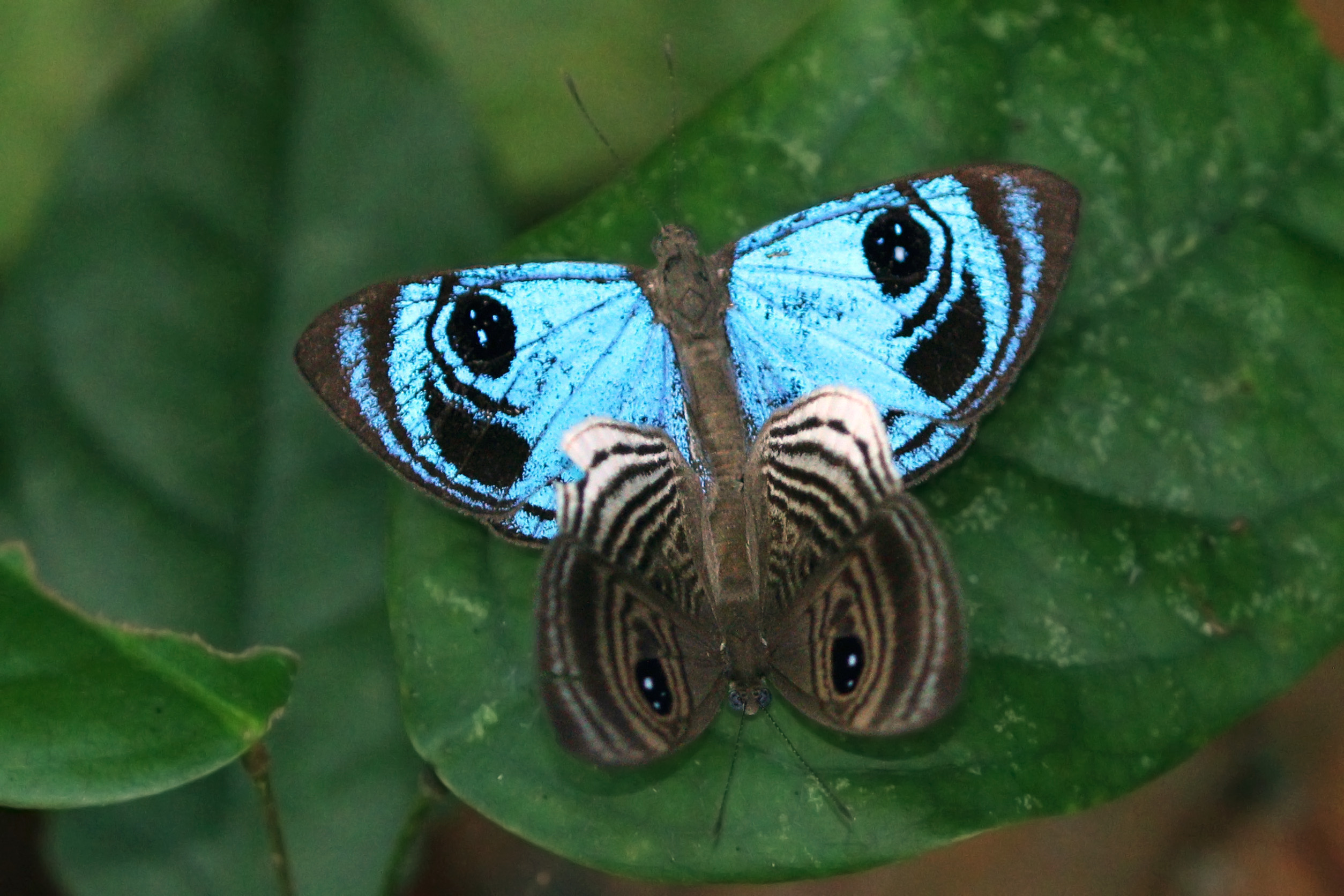
S. marisa mating Cristalino River, Southern Amazon, Brazil
