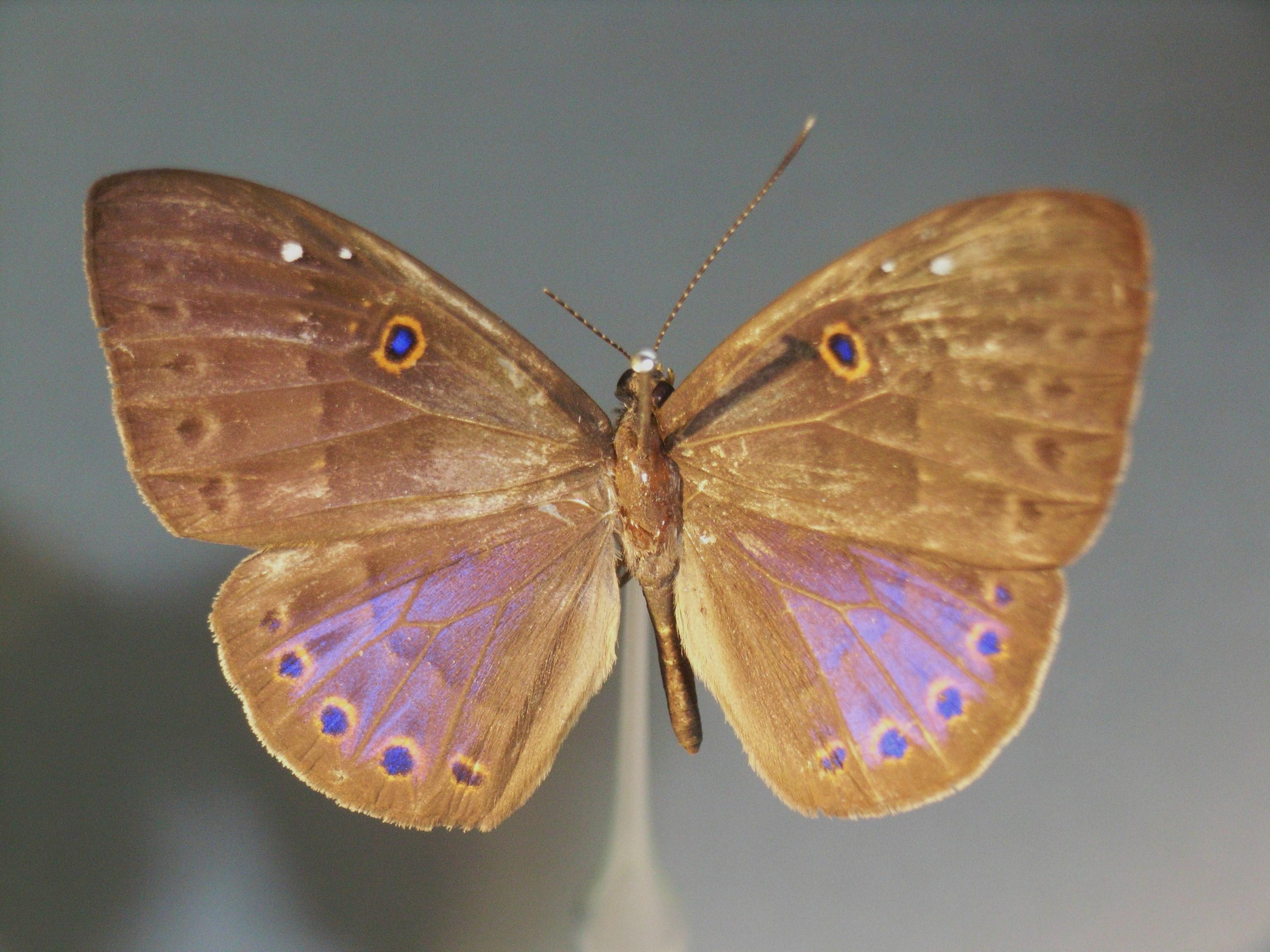
- Eurybia nicaeus

Scientific classification
- Kingdom: Animalia
- Phylum: Arthropoda
- Clade: Pancrustacea
- Class: Insecta
- Order: Lepidoptera
- Family: Riodinidae
- Subfamily: Riodininae
- Tribe: Eurybiini
- Genus: Eurybia; Illiger, 1807

Species
- See text

Synonyms
- Gonopteris Geyer, 1832

= Eurybia (butterfly) =

Genus of butterflies

Eurybia is a Neotropical genus of metalmark butterflies found from Mexico to Bolivia.

== Description ==
The body is very slender, the head small, the thorax long, the abdomen in both sexes bilaterally compressed, thin and pointed. The wings are entire, the hindwings with a round border, only in a somewhat deviating group the forewings are pointed falciformly at the apex. The ground colour is above dark brown, the border of the hindwing often with a ruddle-red tinge. Only in one case (Eurybia latifasciata (Hewitson, 1870) the wing is traversed by a broad white band (in a species flying together with just the same banded species of other genera (Mesosemia). The forewings mostly exhibit at the cell-end an eyespot or ringspot. Head broad, forehead broad and flat, eyes of medium size, naked, slightly convex, palpi bent up in front of the face, not projecting, but often brightly coloured; second joint more than twice as long as the first one, the third a minute knob. Antennae very long, reaching about two thirds of the costa, thin, at the ends scarcely thickened. Thorax slender, legs short, the legs, on being stretched out, scarcely reach the anus; abdomen long and slim, mostly extending considerably beyond the anal angle. Wings broad, in the forewing the subcostal is five branched, the submedian bifurcated at the base, the cell broad, cuneiform, of different shapes, at the end sometimes more straightly cut off, sometimes angled laciniformly. The hindwings are sometimes slightly angled between the upper and middle radial-ends.

== Species ==
Listed alphabetically:

- Eurybia albiseriata Weymer, 1890
- Eurybia caerulescens Druce, 1904 – bluish eurybia or Druce's underleaf
- Eurybia carolina Godart, [1824]
- Eurybia cyclopia Stichel, 1910 – fire-bordered eurybia
- Eurybia dardus (Fabricius, 1787) – Dardus eurybia, Dardus underleaf
- Eurybia donna C. & R. Felder, 1862
- Eurybia elvina Stichel, 1910 – Elvina eurybia or blind eurybia
- Eurybia franciscana C. & R. Felder, 1862
- Eurybia halimede (Hübner, [1807]) – Halimede eurybia
- Eurybia jemima Hewitson, 1869 – Jemima Eeurybia
- Eurybia juturna C. & R. Felder, 1865
- Eurybia latifasciata (Hewitson, 1870)
- Eurybia lycisca Westwood, 1851 – blue-winged eurybia
- Eurybia misellivestis Stichel, 1910
- Eurybia molochina Stichel, 1910 – Molochina eurybia, Molochina underleaf
- Eurybia nicaeus (Fabricius, 1775) – Nicaeus eurybia
- Eurybia patrona Weymer, 1875 – great eurybia
- Eurybia pergaea (Geyer, 1832)
- Eurybia rubeolata Stichel, 1910 – rubeolata eurybia
- Eurybia silaceana Stichel, 1924
- Eurybia unxia Godman & Salvin, [1885] – Unxia eurybia or azure-winged eurybia
