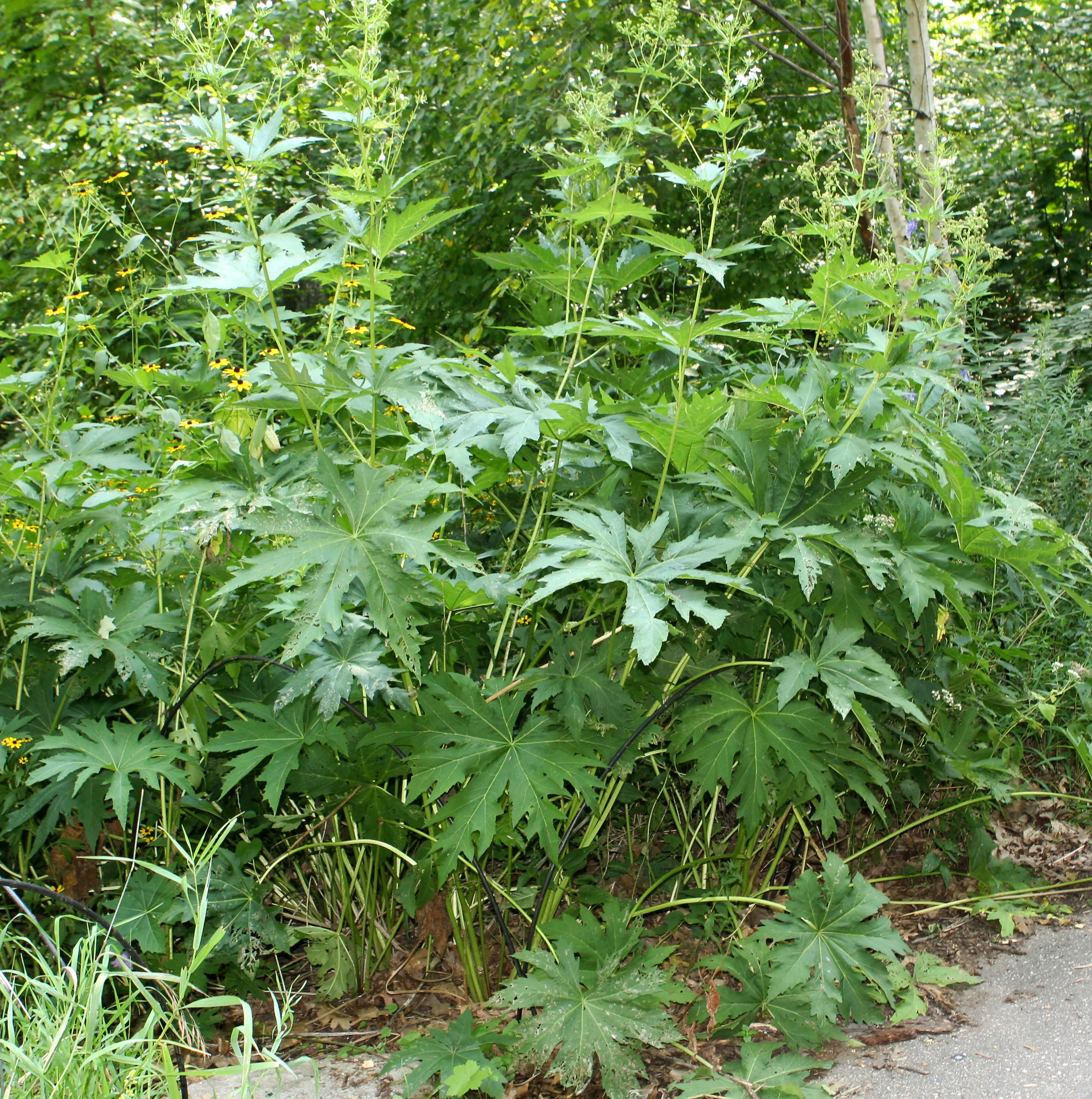

Scientific classification
- Kingdom: Plantae
- Clade: Embryophytes
- Clade: Tracheophytes
- Clade: Spermatophytes
- Clade: Angiosperms
- Clade: Eudicots
- Clade: Rosids
- Order: Malvales
- Family: Malvaceae
- Subfamily: Malvoideae
- Tribe: Malveae
- Genus: Napaea; L.
- Species: N. dioica

Binomial name
- Napaea dioica L.

= Napaea dioica =

Species of flowering plant

Napaea is a monotypic genus of flowering plants in the mallow family Malvaceae. The single species is Napaea dioica, a tall perennial herbaceous plant, native to central and eastern USA. Plants are occasionally grown as ornamentals in wildflower gardens. A common name is glade mallow.

== Description ==
Napaea dioica grows 1.5–3 metres (5–10 ft) tall with leaves up to 75 centimetres (30 in) in length. The large leaves are alternately arranged, with the lower leaves nine to eleven parted with short hairs on their undersides. Plants produce more than one flowering stems. The white flowers bloom for 4–5 weeks appearing in late June. The flowers have five petals and five sepals and the flowers are organized into a panicle. The blooms open in the morning and close at sundown. It is dioecious, with separate male and female plants. The fruits are rounded in shape, and ripen into separating many-seeded indehiscent locules.

== Habitat ==
Napaea dioica is found growing in areas with moist soil in full sun to part shade. In Minnesota, where it is listed as endangered, it is found growing in alluvial meadows of the Mississippi river and its tributaries; with other large herbaceous perennials such as Heracleum lanatum, Silphium perfoliatum, and Rudbeckia laciniata.

== Distribution ==
The species is found in east-central Ohio, across central Indiana and the northern half of Illinois to southwestern Wisconsin, southeastern Minnesota and northeastern Iowa. It prefers to grow in damp conditions and can be found in ditches or on stream banks.
