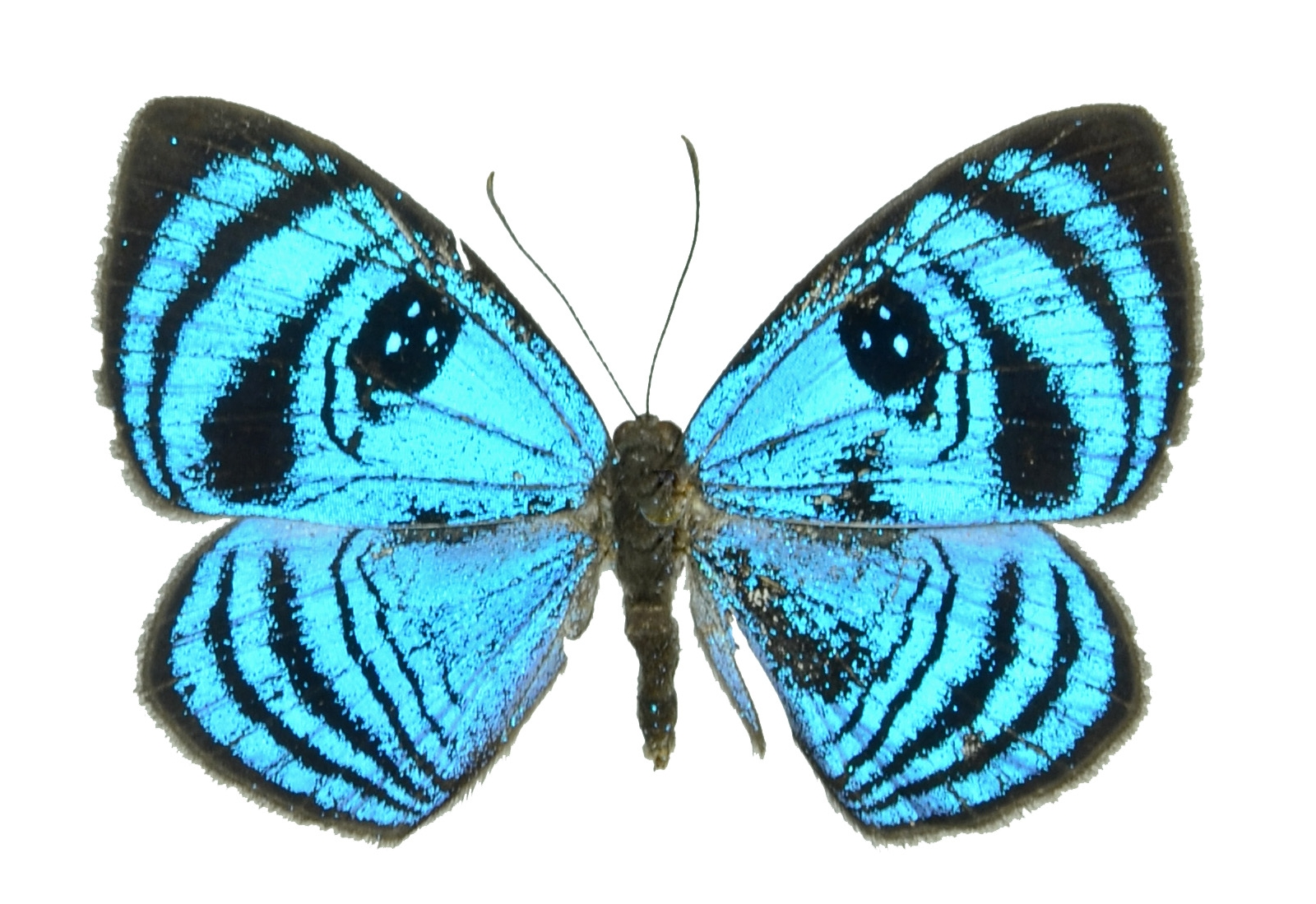
- Dorsal view
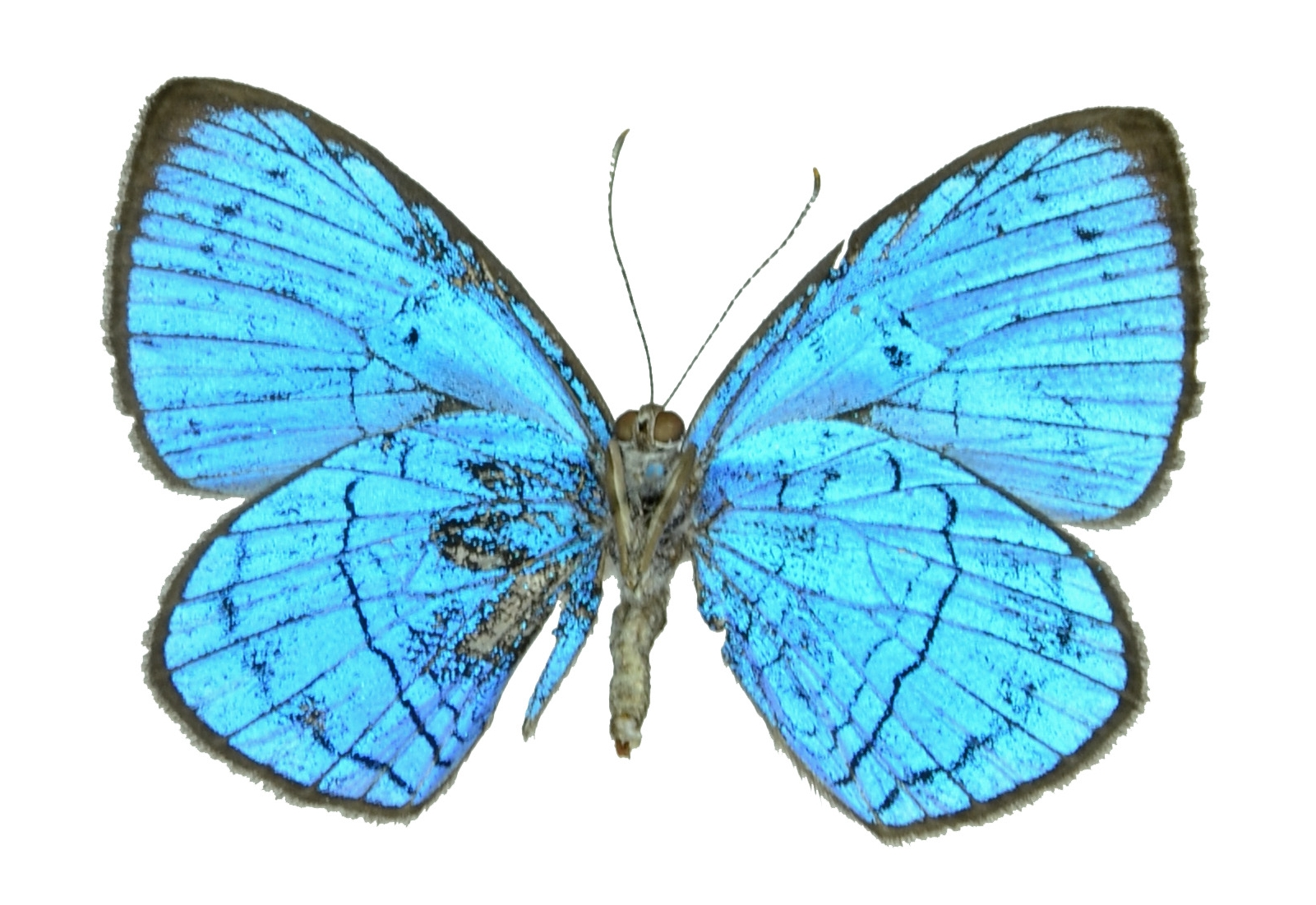
- Ventral view

Scientific classification
- Domain: Eukaryota
- Kingdom: Animalia
- Phylum: Arthropoda
- Class: Insecta
- Order: Lepidoptera
- Family: Riodinidae
- Genus: Semomesia
- Species: S. croesus

Binomial name
- Semomesia croesus (Fabricius, 1777)

Synonyms
- Papilio croesus Fabricius, 1777; Mesosemia arybas Doubleday, 1847; Mesosemia sylvicolens Butler, 1877; Mesosemia thymetina Butler, 1869; Semomesia splendida Seitz, 1913

= Semomesia croesus =

Species of butterfly

Semomesia croesus, also known as the Croesus eyemark, is a species of butterfly in the family Riodinidae. It is found in most of South America.

== Subspecies ==
- Semomesia croesus croesus (Surinam, Brazil: Bahia, Pará)
- Semomesia croesus meana (Hewitson, 1858) (Brazil: Amazonas)
- Semomesia croesus trilineata (Butler, 1874) (Brazil: Amazonas, Colombia, Peru)
- Semomesia croesus lacrimosa Stichel, 1915 (Colombia)
- Semomesia croesus siccata Stichel, 1919 (Bolivia)
- Semomesia croesus undosa Stichel, 1919 (Ecuador)
