= Lucilia (wife of Lucretius) =

Lucilia is believed to have been the wife of the Roman philosopher Lucretius (c. 99 BC – c. 55 BC), though there is little evidence of their relationship, let alone marriage. Moreover, Lucilia was not identified with the wife of Lucretius until many centuries after the latter's death. In Walter Map's twelfth-century work De nugis curialium, "Lucilia" is the name of a woman who murders her husband by giving him a potion that causes him to go insane. Not until 1511, in the vita of Pius Bononiensis, was Lucilia associated with Lucretius. Some have even questioned whether this association was invented for the sake of writing, that is, to maintain literary style.

== Chronological development of the story of Lucilia ==
=== Fourth century ===
St. Jerome contributed to our understanding of Lucretius's death when he wrote:

The poet Titus Lucretius was born. In later life he was sent mad by a love potion; in the intervals of his madness he composed a number of books, later edited by Cicero. He died by his own hand at the age of forty-four.

Whether this account of Lucretius's death is historically accurate is a matter of dispute. What is certain, however, is that St. Jerome's biographical account of Lucretius influenced later writers.

=== Twelfth century ===
Walter Map, in his Dissuasio Valerii, describes a "Lucilia" who poisons her husband accidentally, while intending to give him a love potion; contrasting this Lucilia's accidental poisoning with Livia, who (in Map's telling) deliberately gave aconite to her husband. Map does not give any name to Lucilia's husband.

Liuia uirum suum interfecit quem nimis odit; Lucilia suum quem nimis amauit. Illa sponte miscuit aconiton, hec decepta furorem propinauit pro amoris poculo. Amice, contrariis contendunt uotis iste; neutra tamen defraudata est fine fraudis feminee, proprio id est malo. Variis et diuersis incedunt semitis femine; quibuscunque anfractibus errent, quantiscunque deuient inuiis, unicus est exitus, unica omnium viarum suarum meta, unicum caput et conuentus omnium diuersitatum suarum, malicia. Exemplum harum experimentum cape, quod audax est ad omnia queccunque amat vel odit femina, et artificiosa nocere cum vult, quod est semper; et frequenter cum iuuare parat obest, unde fit ut noceat et nolens. In fornace positus es; si aurum es, exibis aurum.

=== Thirteenth and fourteenth centuries ===
Vincent of Beauvais (Spec. Hist. 5.95), Pseudo-Walter Burley, and Guglielmo da Pastrengo, copy Jerome's account of Lucretius's death. Although writing after Walter Map, they merely copy Jerome's earlier account, without mentioning the name "Lucilia."

A medieval scholar attributed an epigram to Lucretius on verse 419 of Ovid's Ibis. In the epigram, Lucretius, speaking through a character named 'Almenicus', talks about a boy, perhaps a lover, named Asterion. He wrote (in Latin):

Unde Lucretius: Cur puer Asterion crudelis? ne fuge amantem. Ne fuge, non equidem est effugiendus amor. Crudeli puero nihil est crudelius umquam. Crudeli puero nil mihi peius obest. Vis verum dicam? Sum mitis: ne fuge amantem. Ni fugias, nil te mitius esse potest. Sed iam non puer es, puero nil mitius umquam. Crudeli puero mihi peius obest.

In the Wife of Bath's Tale, the Wife retells the stories of Livia and Lucilia (as well as several others) which her husband had read from his copy of "Valerie" (that is, Walter Map's Dissuasio Valerii mentioned above).

Of Livia told he me, and of Lucy.
They bothè made their husbands for to die;
That one for love, that other was for hate.
Livia her husband on an evening late
Empoisoned has, for that she was his foe.
Lucia likerous loved her husband so
That for he should always upon her think,
She have him such a manner love-drink
That he was dead ere it were by the morrow...

In other manuscripts, "Lucilia" appears in place of "Lucia."

=== Fifteenth and sixteenth centuries ===
Girolamo Borgia was the first to associate Lucretius's death with a female figure, albeit without using the name "Lucilia." He wrote:

[Lucretius] lived forty-four years, and at last, driven mad by the noxious potion of an evil woman, he resolved to take his own life by hanging himself or else, as others think, he fell on his sword.

Johannes Baptista Pius was the first to associate a woman named 'Lucilia' with the death of Lucretius. He wrote (in Latin):

Morbi vi, iit fit, consiimtiin esse, sed, ut ejus obitiim faciant, scribunt, eum sibi ipsum manus attulisse: aliitaedio vitae, quod patriara suam ambitionc, avaritia, luxuria, discordia, etsimilibus civitatuin, qiiap diu floruerunt, et jam senescunt, morbis aestuare atque afflictari videret: alii aegritudine animi, quod memmii sui, qui in exilium pulsus erat, tristem casum aequo animo ferre non posset: alii iurore percitum, in quem Lucilia, sive uxor sive amica, amatorio poculo porrecto, eum imprudens adegerat, cum ab eo amari, non ei necem inferre, aut bonam mentem adimere, vallet. Quoniam autem de numero libronim a nostro poeta scriptorum nonnulli dubitarunt, et, levissiniis argumentis adducti, plures, quam sex, ab eo scriptos esse existimarunt, videturhic error minuendus, atque haec dubitatio tollenda. Omino igitur sex libros duntaxat de natura rerum scripsit T. Lucretius Carus...

Obertus Giphanius and Lambin speculated on the nature of the relationship between Lucilia and Lucretius. Giphanius wrote:

According to Eusebius, [Lucretius] died by his own hands, in the forty-fourth year of his age, being dementated by a philtre, which either his mistress, or his wife, Lucilia, for so some call her, though without authority, in a fit of jealousy.

Pomponio Leto also speculated on the nature of Lucretius's love life, though he offered a different story. He wrote:

They claim this happened to him for love of a boy, whom for his brightness and extraordinary beauty [Lucretius] called Astericon.

Crinitus, Candidus, and Giraldi all discuss the death of Lucretius.

=== Nineteenth century ===
Tennyson discussed Lucilia's motivation for giving the potion to Lucretius. He claimed that Lucilia was frustrated with Lucretius because he had become a less passionate lover.

She Brook'd it not; but wrathful, petulant,
Dreaming some rival, sought and found a witch
Who'd brew'd the philtre which had power, they said,
To lead an errant passion home again.
And this, at times, she mingled with his drink,
And this destroy'd him; for the wicked broth
Confused the chemic labour of the blood...
