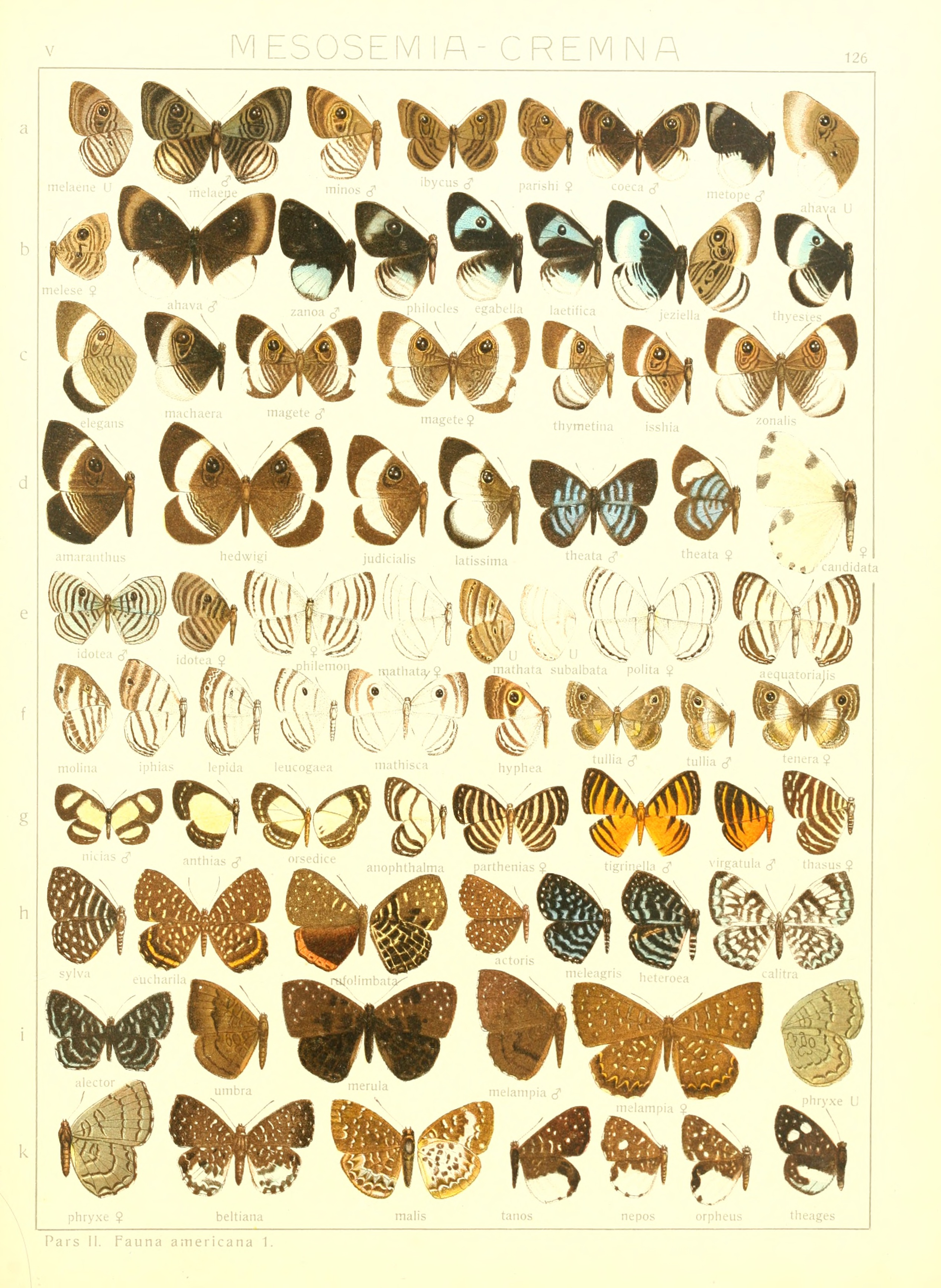

Scientific classification
- Kingdom: Animalia
- Phylum: Arthropoda
- Clade: Pancrustacea
- Class: Insecta
- Order: Lepidoptera
- Family: Riodinidae
- Subfamily: Riodininae
- Tribe: Mesosemiini
- Genus: Napaea; Hübner, 1819

= Napaea (butterfly) =

Genus of butterflies

Napaea is a genus in the butterfly family Riodinidae present only in the Neotropical realm.

Napaea contains strong butterflies with a robust body. The margin of the forewings is not projecting so far, the apex not so very falcate (sickle shaped), the costal of the forewing is not connected with the subcostal. They have a distinctive pattern of metallic blue or white or yellow comma-shaped marks, chevrons or punctiform spots, although in some species the markings are greatly reduced. They found in primary and degraded forest. The butterflies perch with the wings outspread in bushes near the skirts of the forests, out of which they may be beaten. They are not common.

== Taxonomy ==
Now includes Cremna.

== Species ==
- Napaea agroeca Stichel, 1910 present in Brazil
- Napaea beltiana (Bates, 1867) present in French Guiana, Guyana, Suriname, Colombia and Brazil
- Napaea danforthi Warren & Opler, 1999 present in Mexico
- Napaea elisae (Zikán, 1952) present in Brazil
- Napaea eucharila (Bates, 1867) present in Mexico, Costa Rica, Panama, French Guiana, Suriname and Brazil
- Napaea gynaecomorpha Hall, Harvey & Gallard, 2005
- Napaea merula (Thieme, 1907) present in Ecuador
- Napaea melampia (Bates, 1867) present in Brazil
- Napaea neildi Hall & Willmott, 1998 present in Ecuador
- Napaea nepos (Fabricius, 1793) present in French Guiana, Guyana, Paraguay and Peru
- Napaea orpheus (Westwood, 1851) present in French Guiana and Brazil
- Napaea paupercula Zikán, 1952 present in Brazil
- Napaea phryxe (C. & R. Felder, 1865) present in Brazil
- Napaea sylva (Möschler, 1877) present in French Guiana, Guyana and Suriname
- Napaea tanos Stichel, 1910 present in Bolivia
- Napaea theages (Godman & Salvin, 1878) present in Panama, Nicaragua, Costa Rica, Colombia and Ecuador
- Napaea tumbesia Hall & Lamas, 2001 present in Peru
- Napaea umbra (Boisduval, 1870) present in Mexico and Brazil
- Napaea zikani Stichel, 1923 present in Brazil

== Sources ==
- Napaea sur funet
