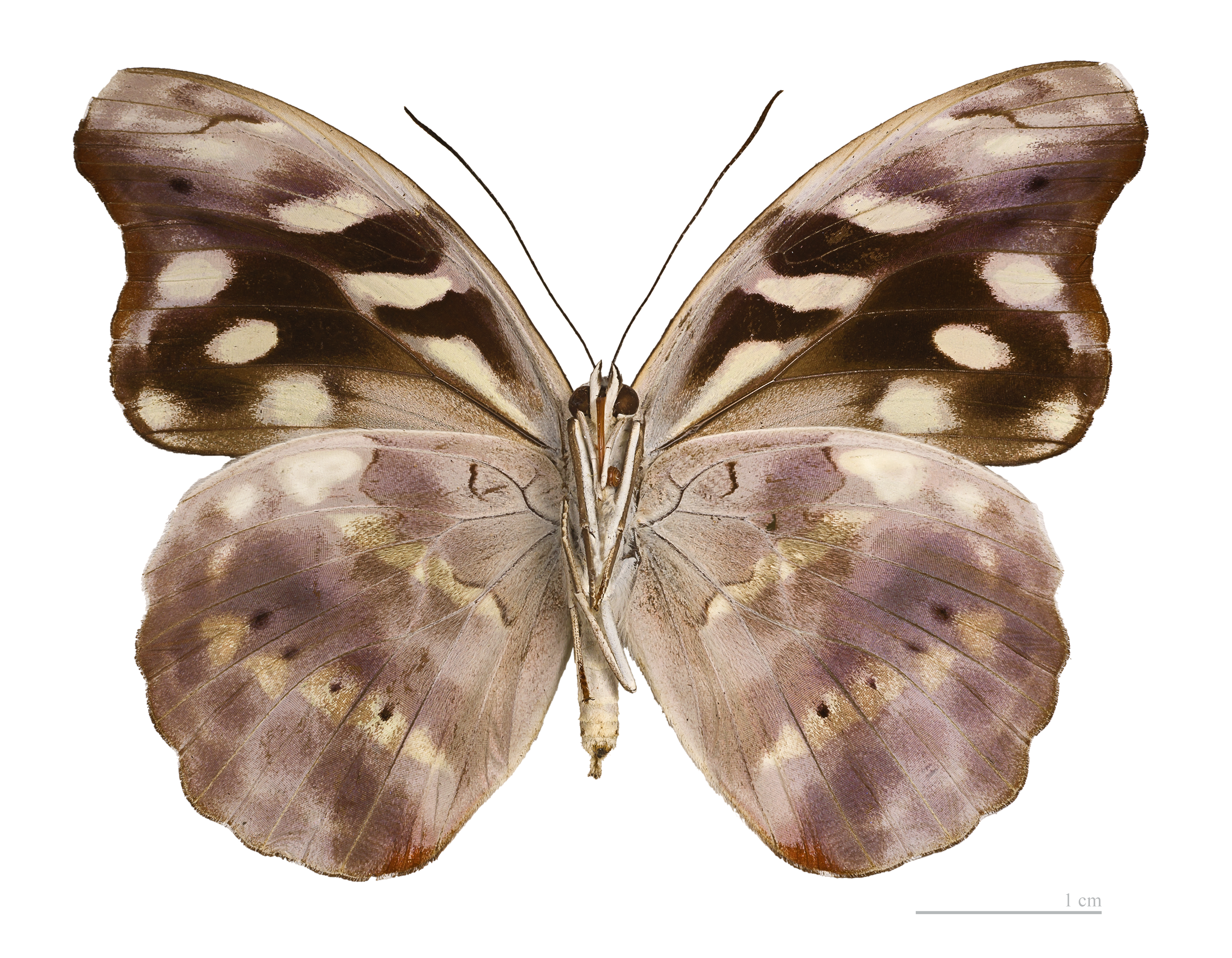
- Catonephele acontius

Scientific classification
- Domain: Eukaryota
- Kingdom: Animalia
- Phylum: Arthropoda
- Class: Insecta
- Order: Lepidoptera
- Family: Nymphalidae
- Tribe: Epicaliini
- Genus: Catonephele; Hübner, [1819]

Species
- Several, see text

Synonyms
- Epicalia Boisduval 1870 (non Doubleday, 1844: preoccupied); Epicalia Doubleday, 1844

= Catonephele =

Genus of brush-footed butterflies

Catonephele is a nymphalid butterfly genus found in Mexico, Central America, South America, and the West Indies.

== Species ==
Listed alphabetically:

- Catonephele acontius (Linnaeus, 1771) – Acontius firewing
- Catonephele antinoe (Godart, [1824]) – Antinoe catone
- Catonephele chromis (Doubleday, [1848]) – cloud-forest catone
- Catonephele cortesi Maza, 1982 – West-Mexican catone
- Catonephele mexicana Jenkins & Maza, 1985 – Guatemalan catone
- Catonephele numilia (Cramer, [1775]) – blue-frosted banner, blue-frosted catone, Grecian shoemaker, or stoplight catone
- Catonephele nyctimus (Westwood, 1850)
- Catonephele orites Stichel, 1899 – orange-banded shoemaker butterfly
- Catonephele sabrina (Hewitson, 1851)
- Catonephele salacia (Hewitson, 1851)
- Catonephele salambria (C. & R. Felder, 1861) – Salambria banner
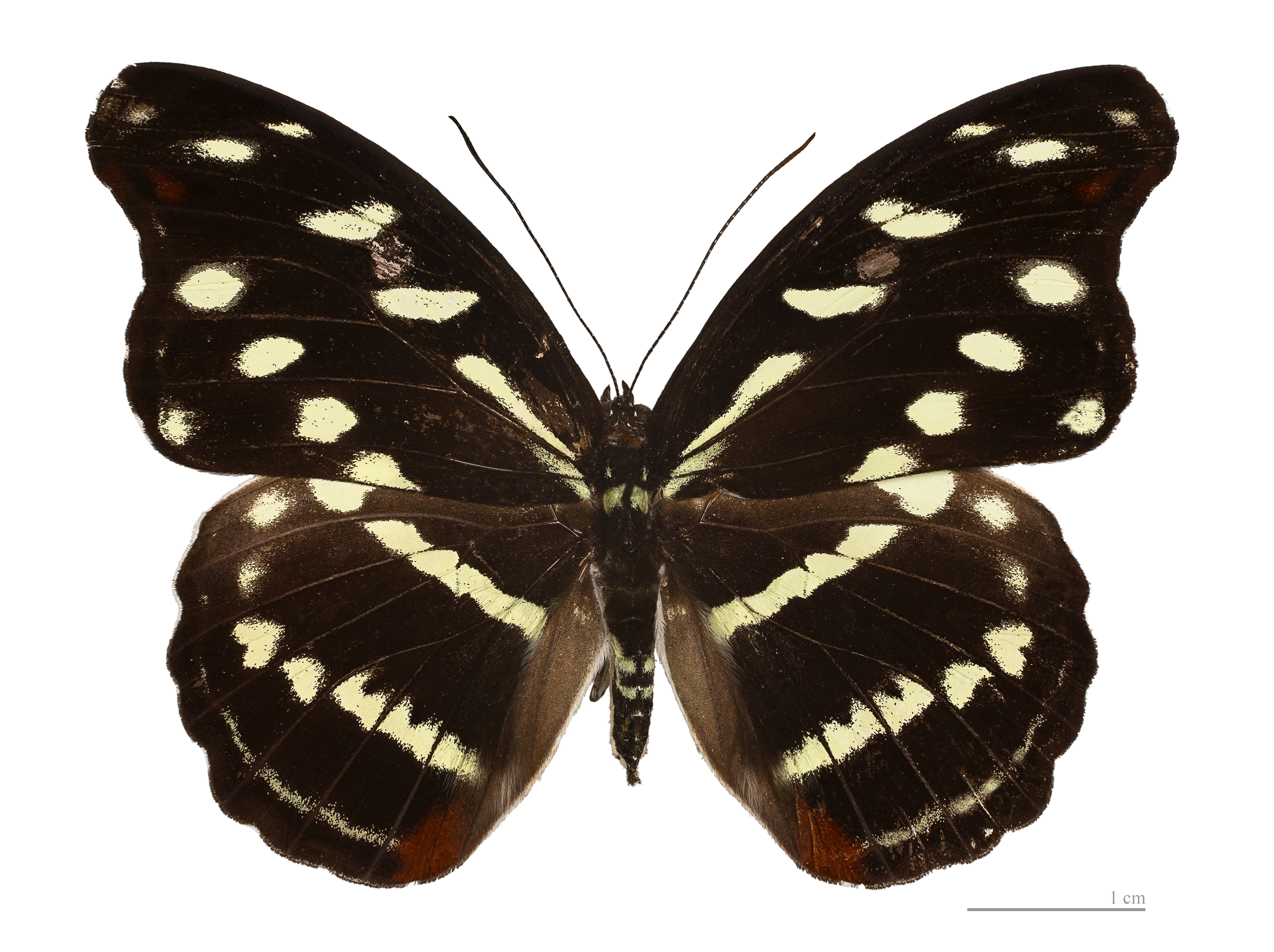
C. acontius

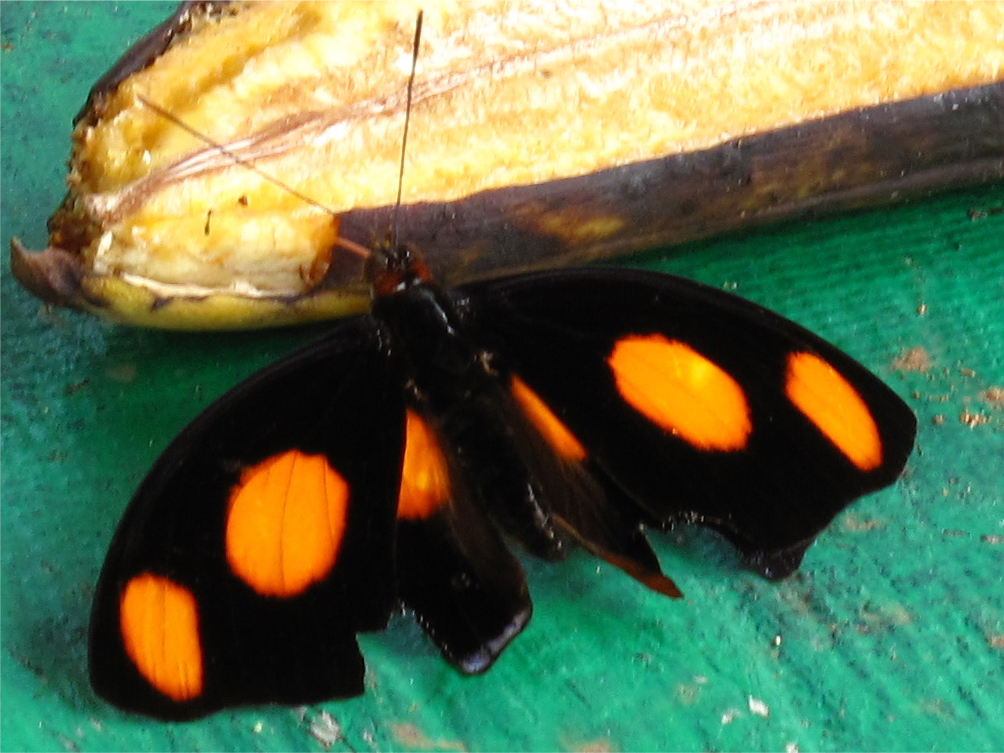
C. numilia

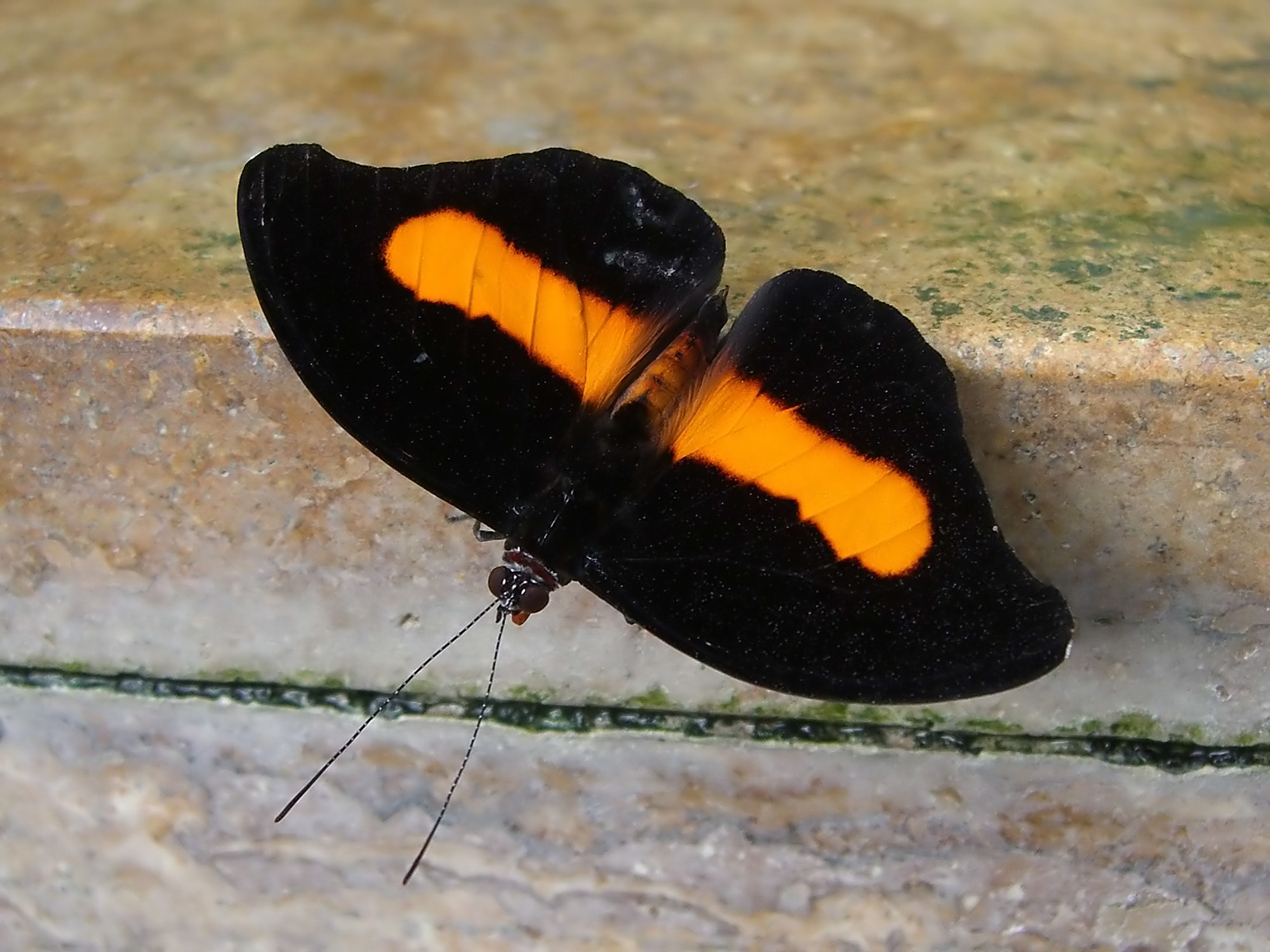
Orange-banded shoemaker butterfly (C. orites)

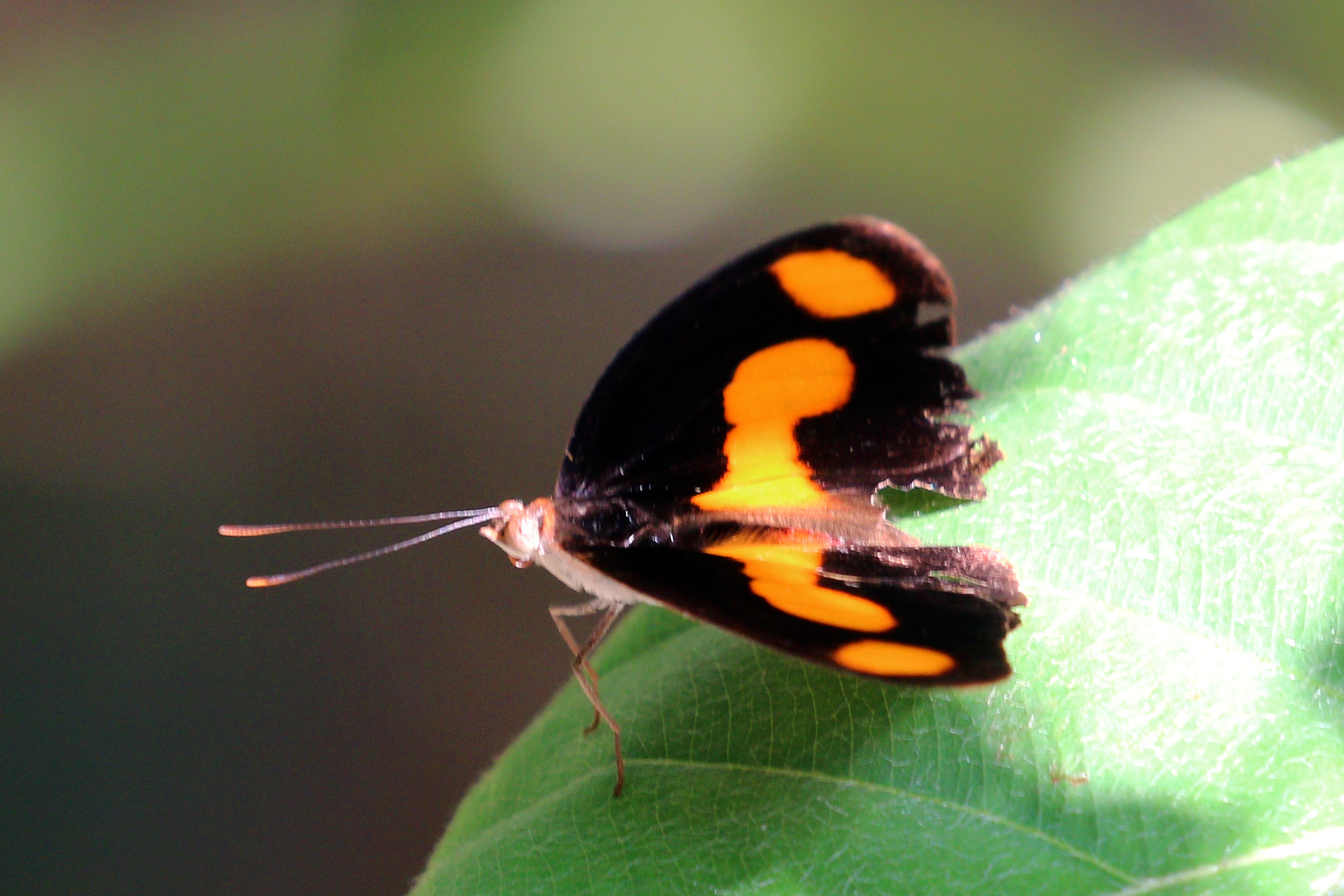
C. antinoe
Cristalino River, Southern Amazon, Brazil

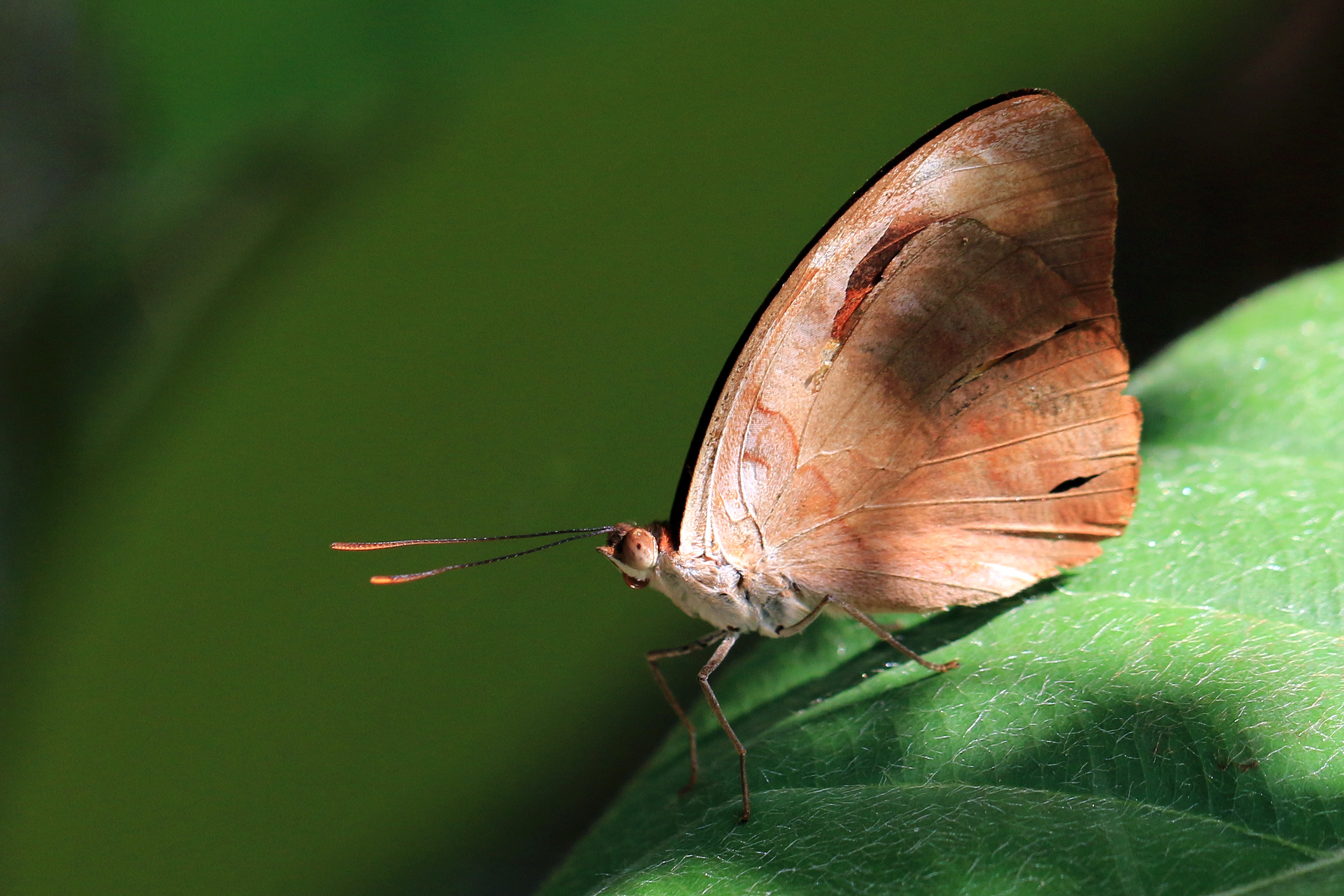
Underside C. antinoe
Cristalino River, Southern Amazon, Brazil
