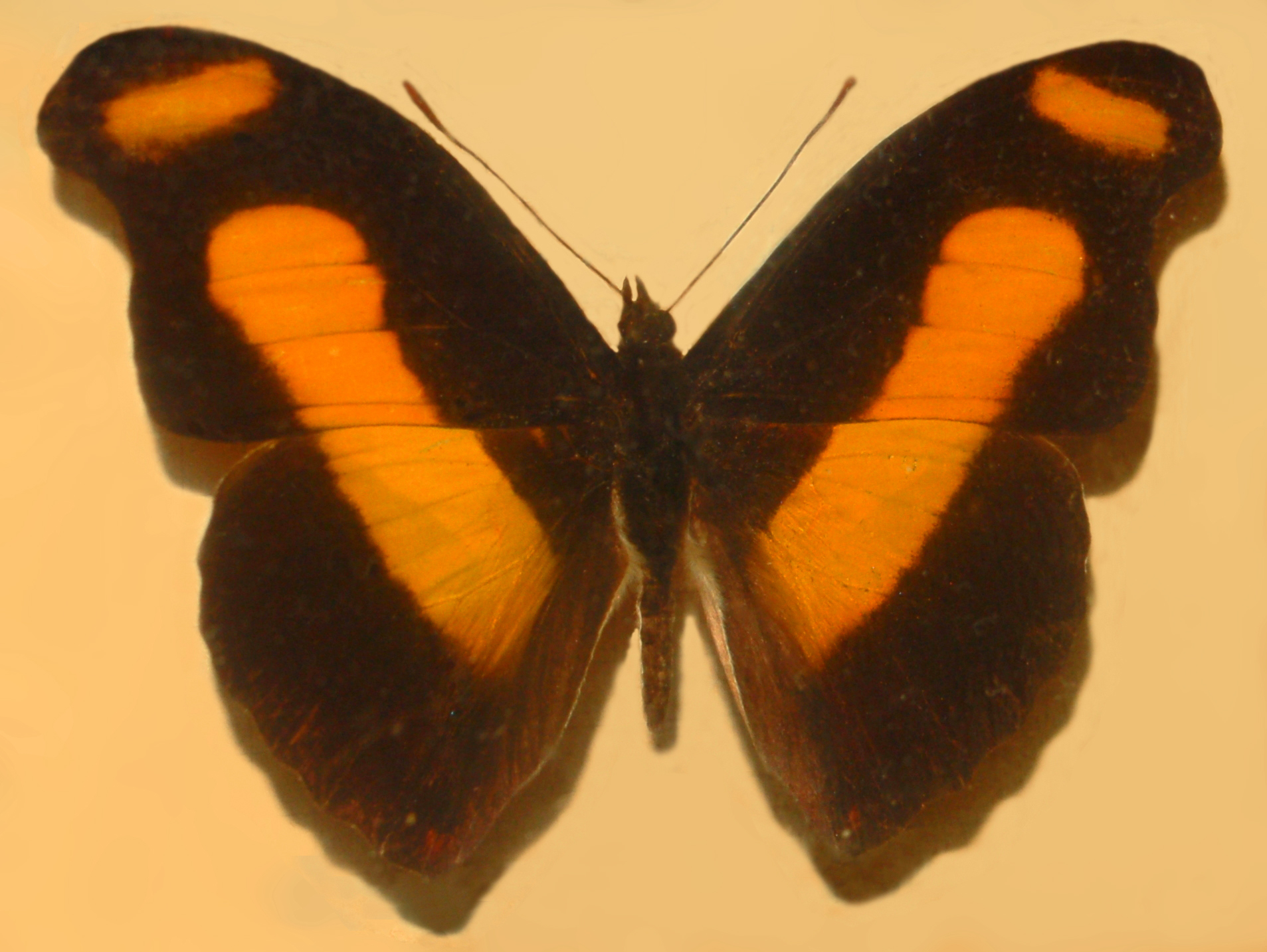
- Mounted specimen from Colombia

Scientific classification
- Domain: Eukaryota
- Kingdom: Animalia
- Phylum: Arthropoda
- Class: Insecta
- Order: Lepidoptera
- Family: Nymphalidae
- Genus: Catonephele
- Species: C. sabrina

Binomial name
- Catonephele sabrina (Hewitson, 1852)

Synonyms
- Epicalia sabrina Hewitson, 1852; Myscelia samaria Hewitson, 1852

= Catonephele sabrina =

Species of butterfly

Catonephele sabrina is a butterfly of the family Nymphalidae.

== Description ==
Catonephele sabrina has a wingspan of about 70 millimetres (2.8 in). The basic colour of the uppersides of the wings is dark brown, with broad orange bands on the forewings and on the hindwings. On the top of the forewings there are large orange spots.

== Distribution ==
This species occurs in Colombia and Brazil.
