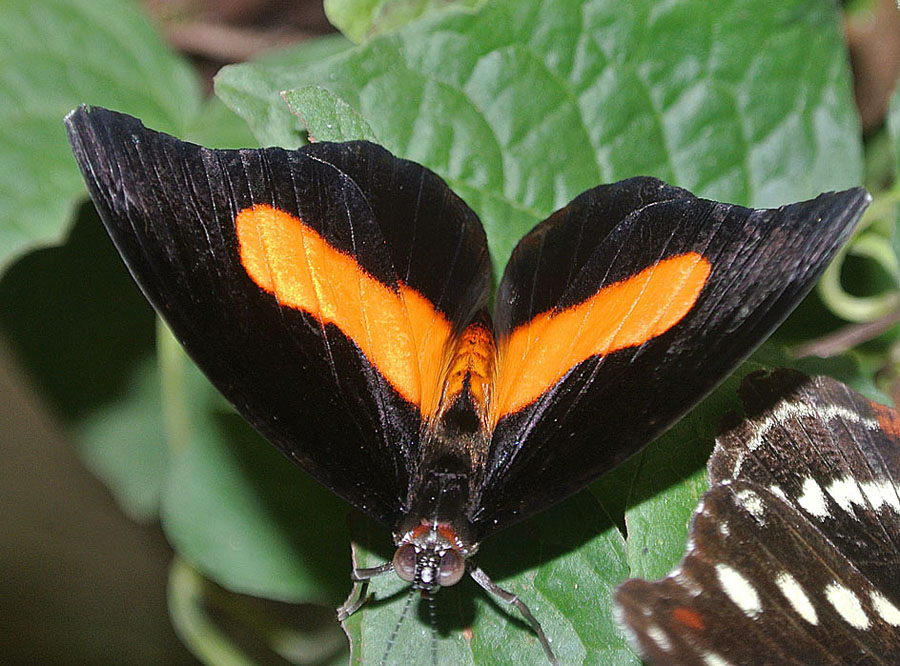
- Male
- Female

Scientific classification
- Kingdom: Animalia
- Phylum: Arthropoda
- Clade: Pancrustacea
- Class: Insecta
- Order: Lepidoptera
- Family: Nymphalidae
- Genus: Catonephele
- Species: C. acontius

Binomial name
- Catonephele acontius (Linnaeus, 1771)

Synonyms
- Papilio acontius Linnaeus, 1771; Papilio antiochus Fabricius, 1775 (nec Linnaeus); Papilio medea Fabricius, 1775 (nec Cramer); Papilio chione Cramer, [1776]; Papilio eupalemon Cramer, [1777]; Catonephele eupalemaena Hübner, [1819]; Catonephele acontius exquisitus Stichel, 1899

= Catonephele acontius =

Species of butterfly

Catonephele acontius, the Acontius firewing, is a nymphalid butterfly species found in South America. It was first described by Carl Linnaeus in 1771 (who gave the type location as "China", a designation followed by some later authors).

== Description ==
(Male, described by Dru Drury): Upperside. Antennae, head, thorax, and abdomen black. Wings fine velvety black. An orange-coloured bar, about 1/4 inch (6 mm) broad, rises in the middle of the superior wings, running circularly and crossing the inferior ones, meeting about the middle of the abdominal edges.

Underside. Palpi white. Tongue brown. Breast and legs white. Abdomen yellow brown. Wings shining brown, exhibiting various shades of changeable colours; the tips terminating in an ash colour. Wings scarcely dentated. Wingspan 2 3/4 inches (70 mm).

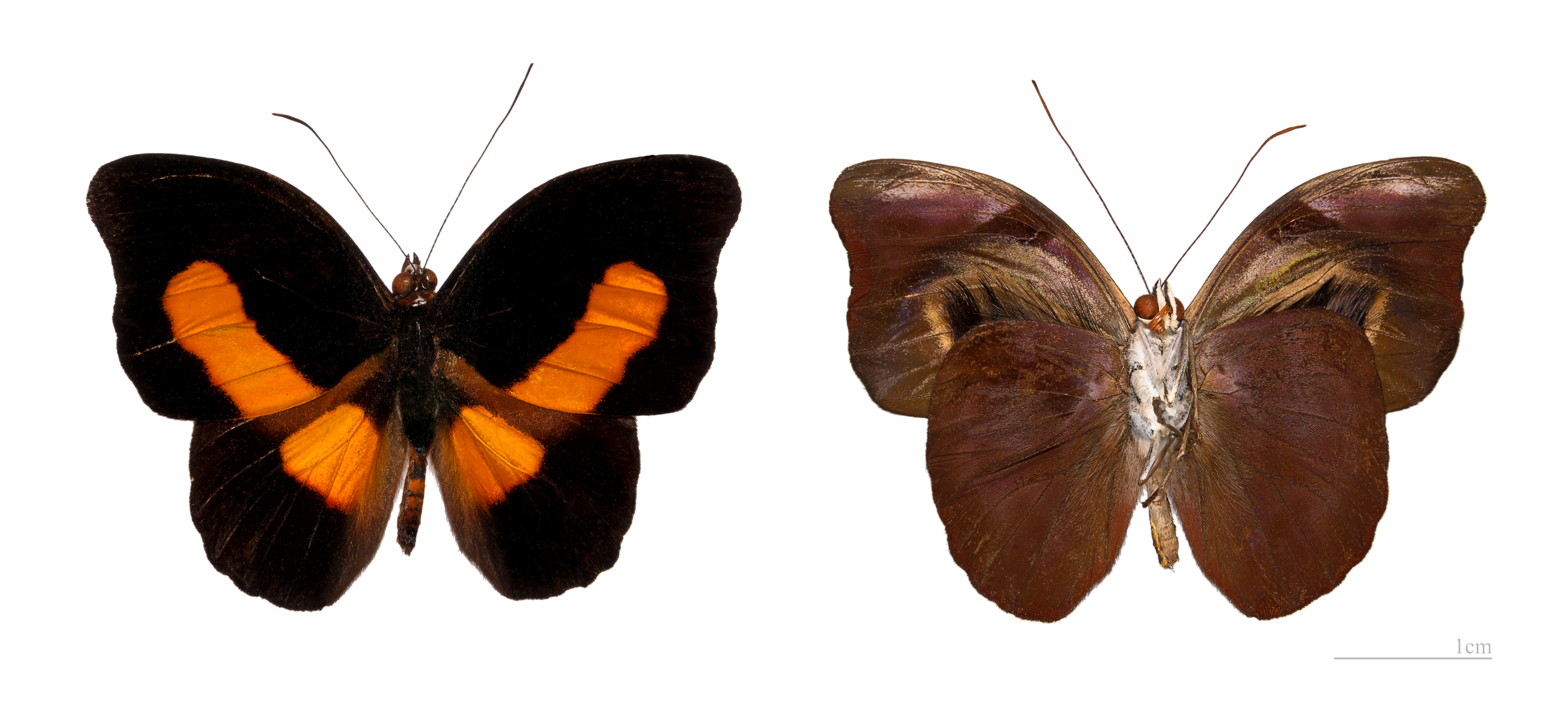
Male

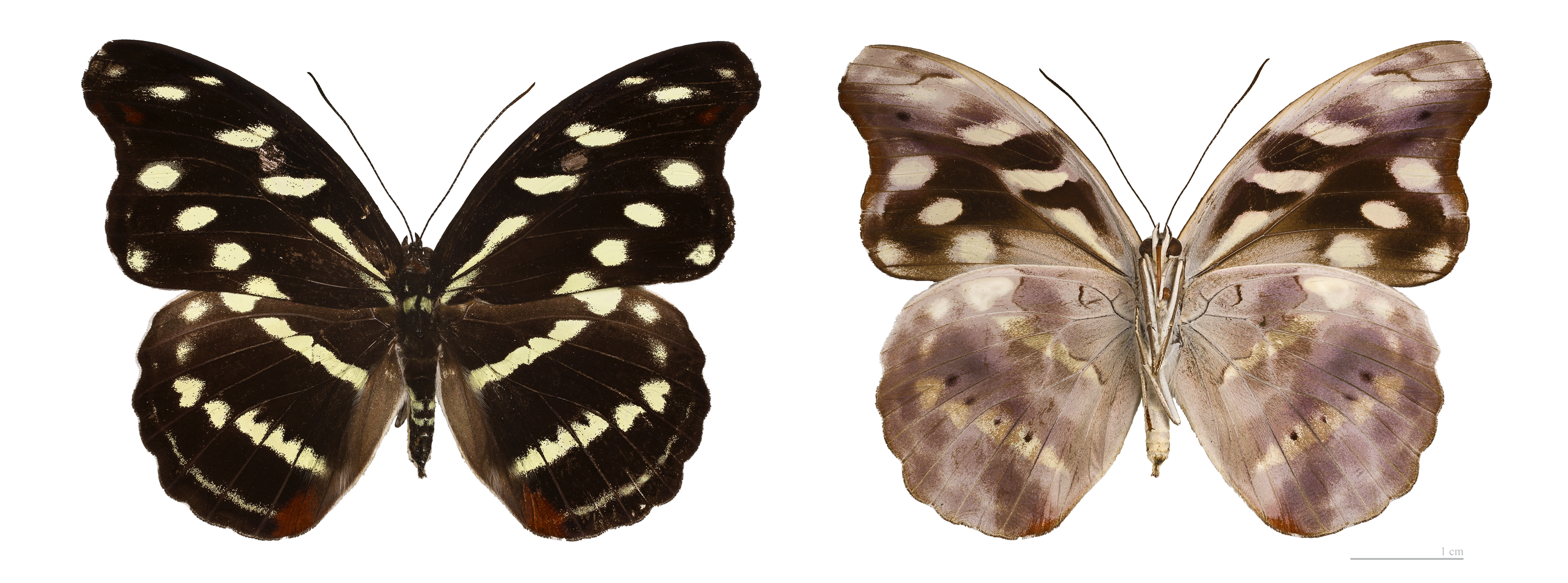
Female

== Subspecies ==
- Catonephele acontius acontius (Guianas, Surinam, Brazil: Amazonas)
- Catonephele acontius caeruleus Jenkins, 1985 (Bolivia)
