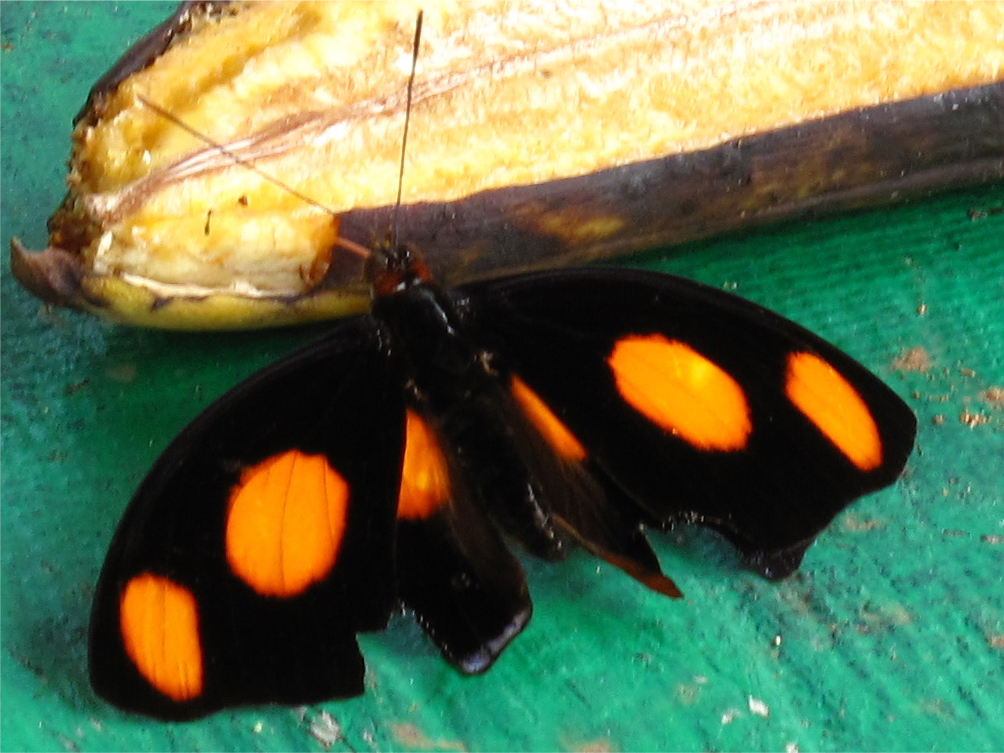
- Male

Scientific classification
- Kingdom: Animalia
- Phylum: Arthropoda
- Class: Insecta
- Order: Lepidoptera
- Family: Nymphalidae
- Genus: Catonephele
- Species: C. numilia

Binomial name
- Catonephele numilia (Cramer, [1775])

Synonyms
- Papilio numilia Cramer, [1775]; Papilio micalia Cramer, 1777 (preocc.); Epicalia esite R. Felder, 1869

= Catonephele numilia =

Species of butterfly

Catonephele numilia, the blue-frosted banner, blue-frosted Catone, Grecian shoemaker or stoplight Catone, is a butterfly of the family Nymphalidae found in Central and South America.

== Description ==
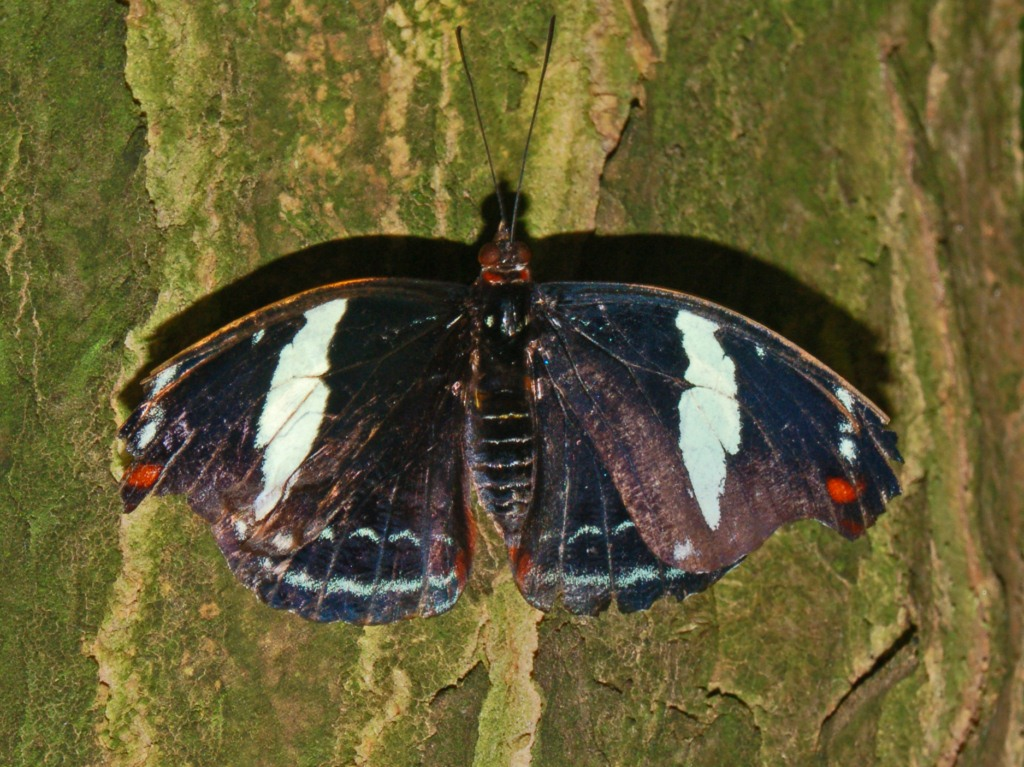
Dorsal view of a female C. n. esite

This butterfly usually flies along the ground and close to the ripe fruits and flowers. It can live a month. Adults feed on rotten fruits, while caterpillars feed on Alchornea species (family Euphorbiaceae).

== Distribution ==
Catonephele numilia can be found in most of Central and South America.

== Subspecies ==
- Catonephele numilia numilia (Suriname)
- Catonephele numilia penthia (Hewitson, 1852) (Brazil)
- Catonephele numilia esite (R. Felder, 1869) (Mexico to Colombia, Ecuador, Venezuela, Trinidad) – synonym of Catonephele numilia penthiana Staudinger, 1886
- Catonephele numilia neogermanica Stichel, 1899 (Paraguay, Brazil)
- Catonephele numilia immaculata Jenkins, 1985 (Mexico)

== Gallery ==
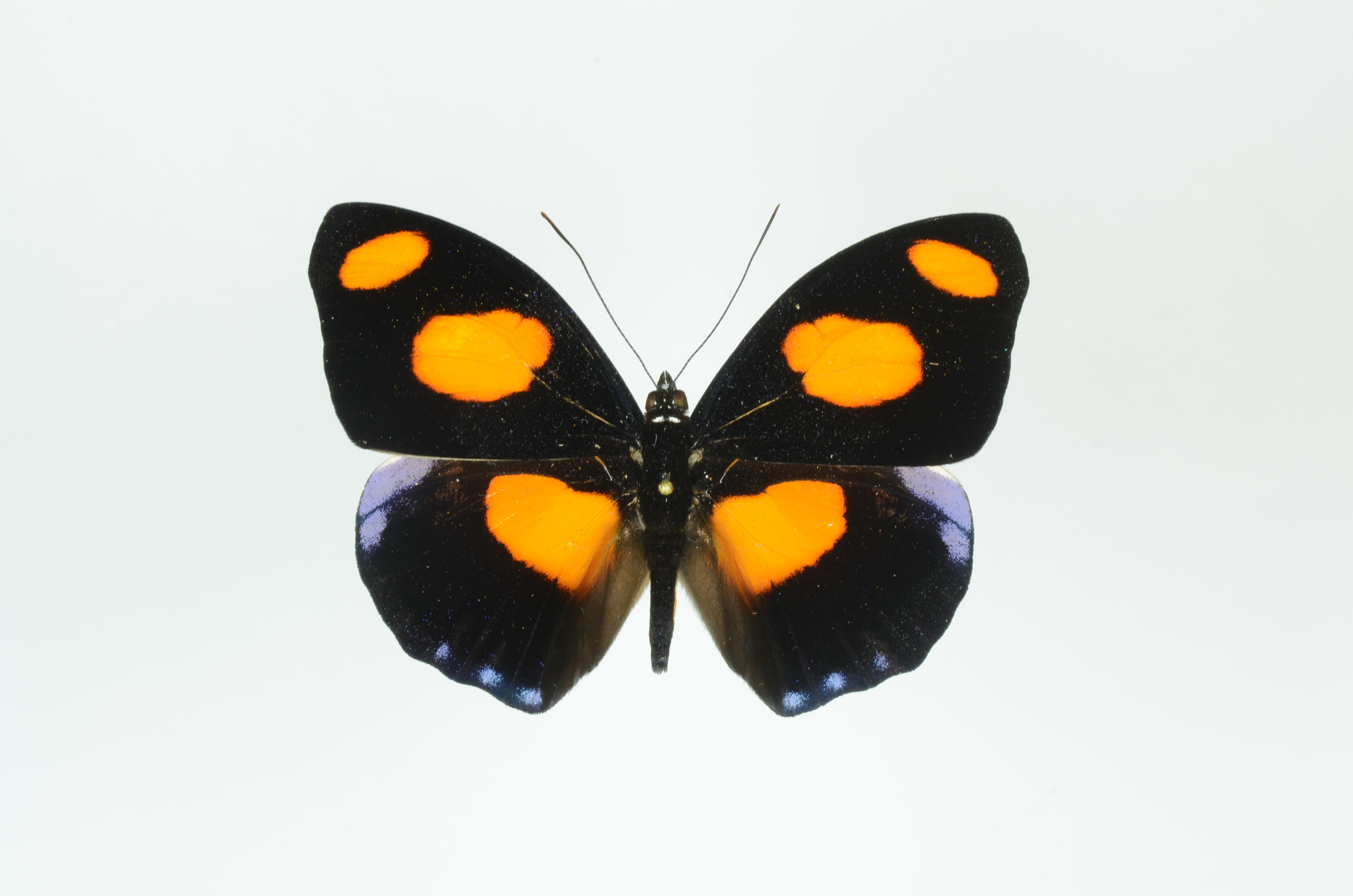
Male, mounted, upperside

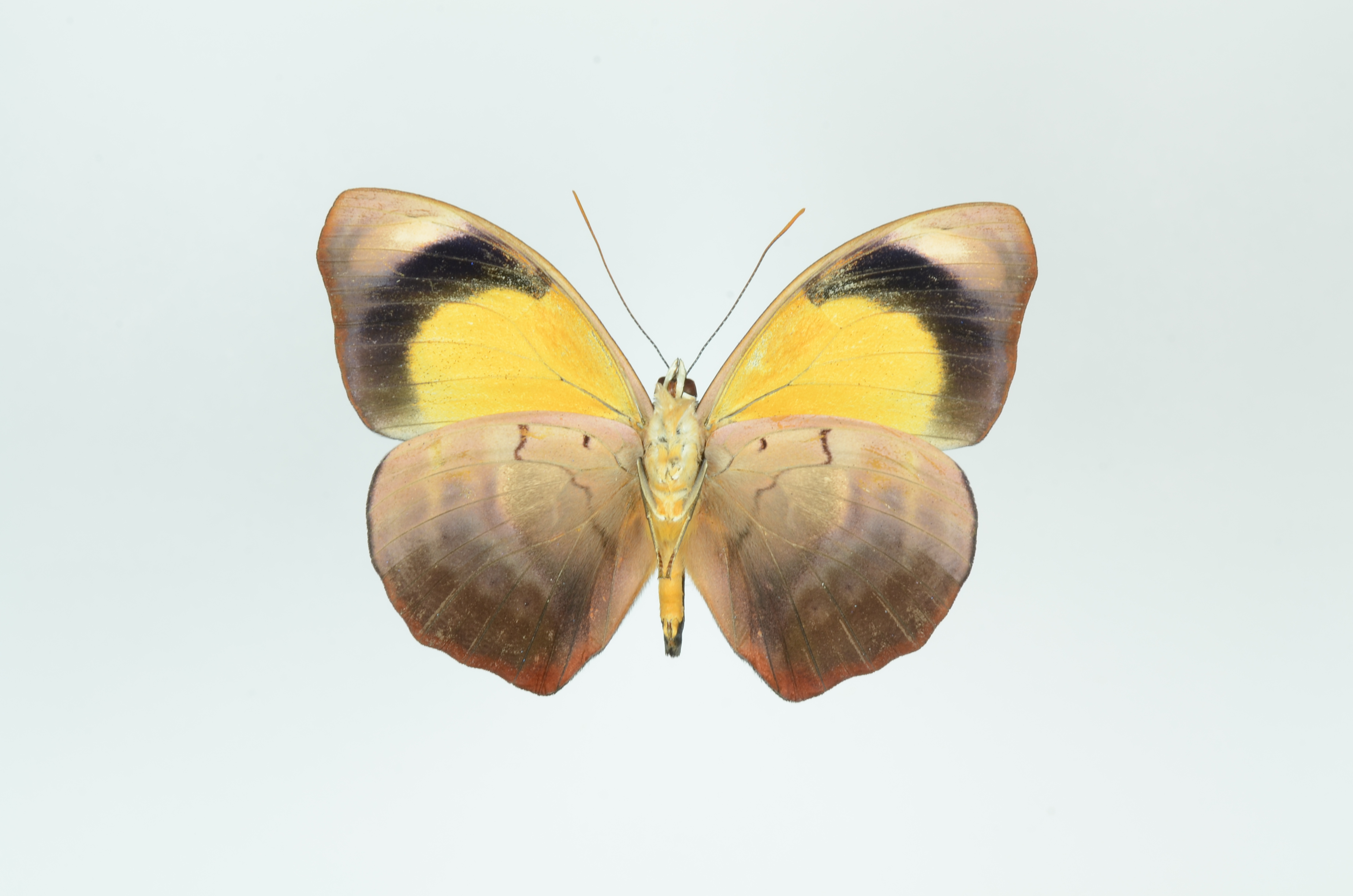
Male, mounted, underside

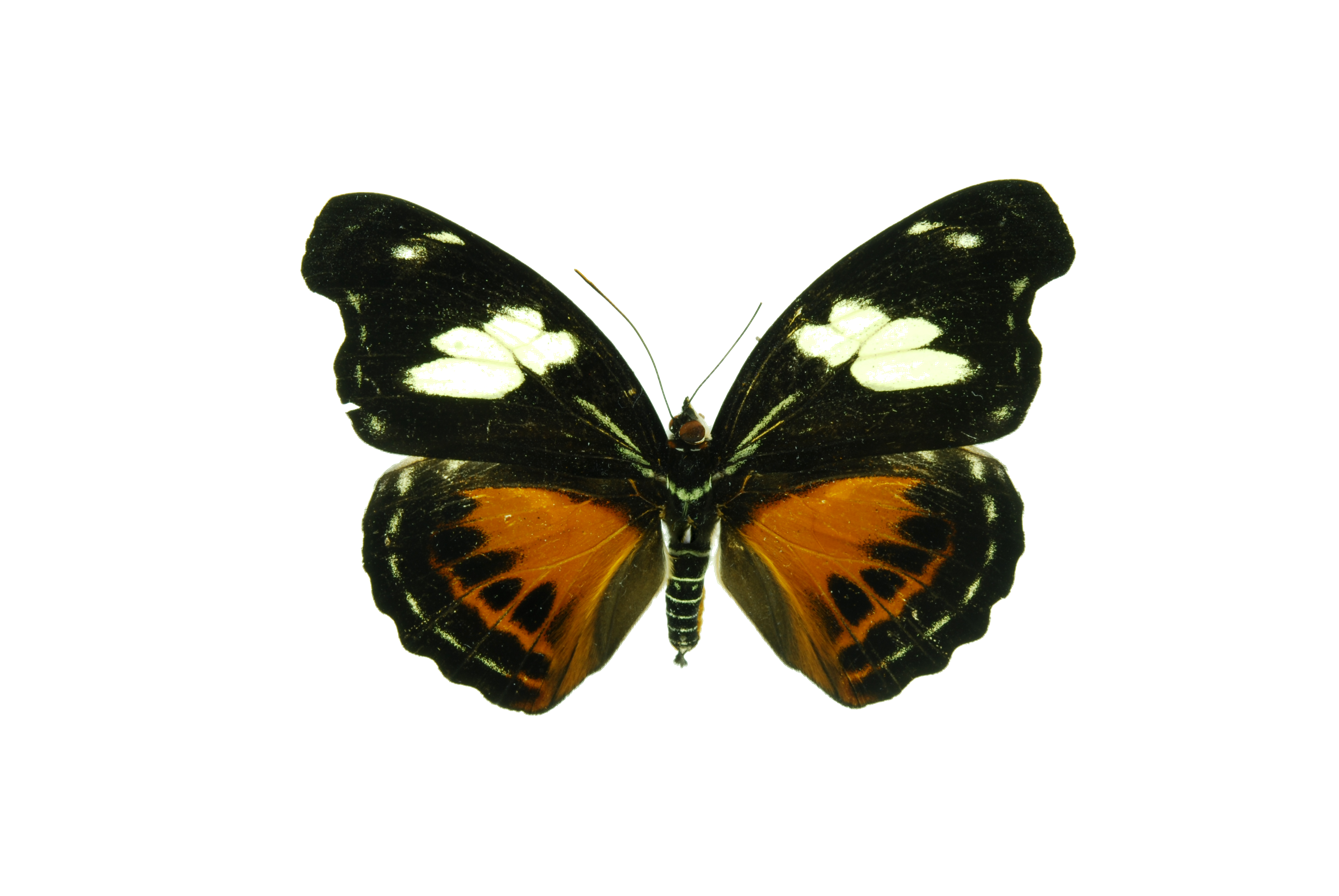
Female, mounted, upperside

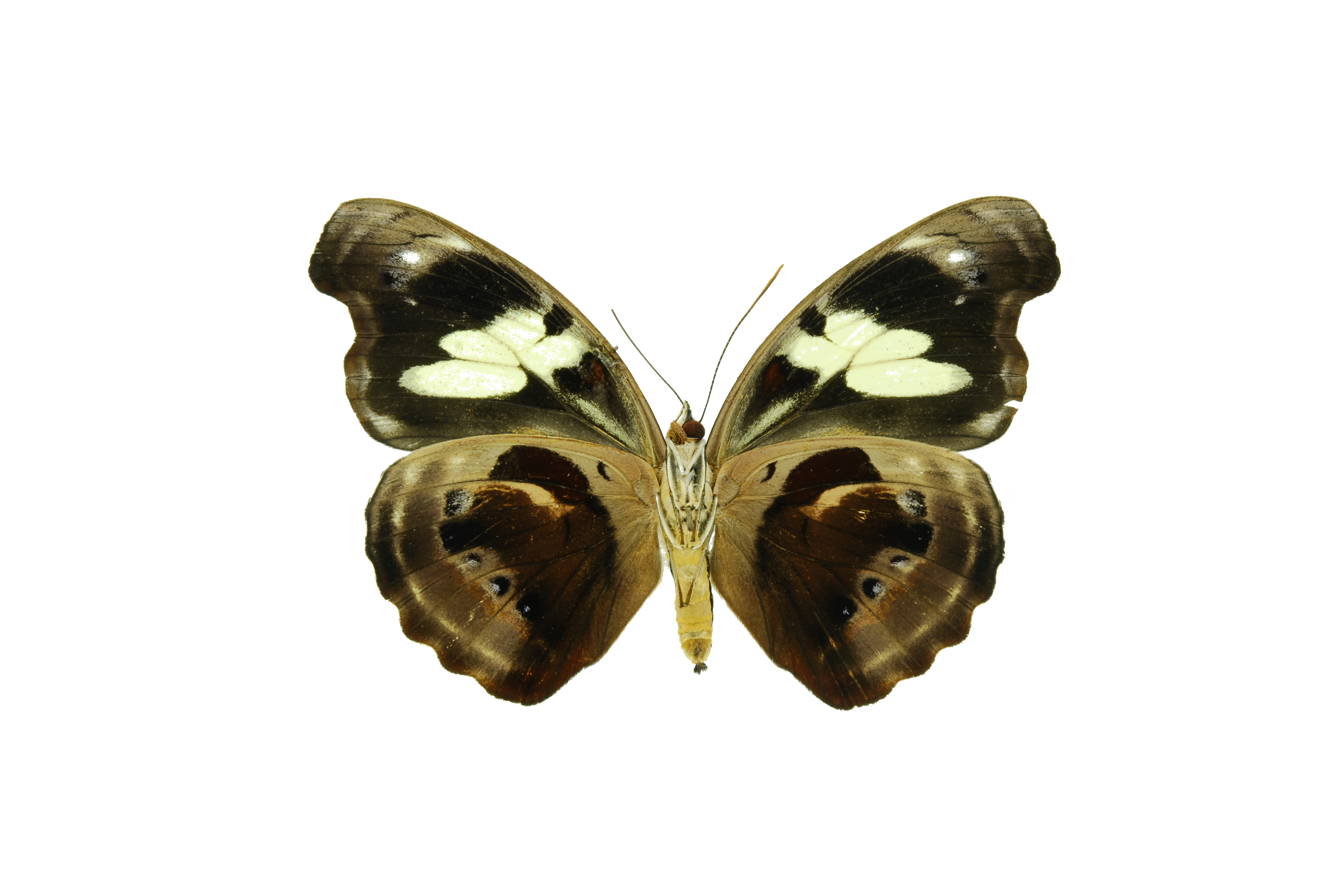
Female, mounted, underside
