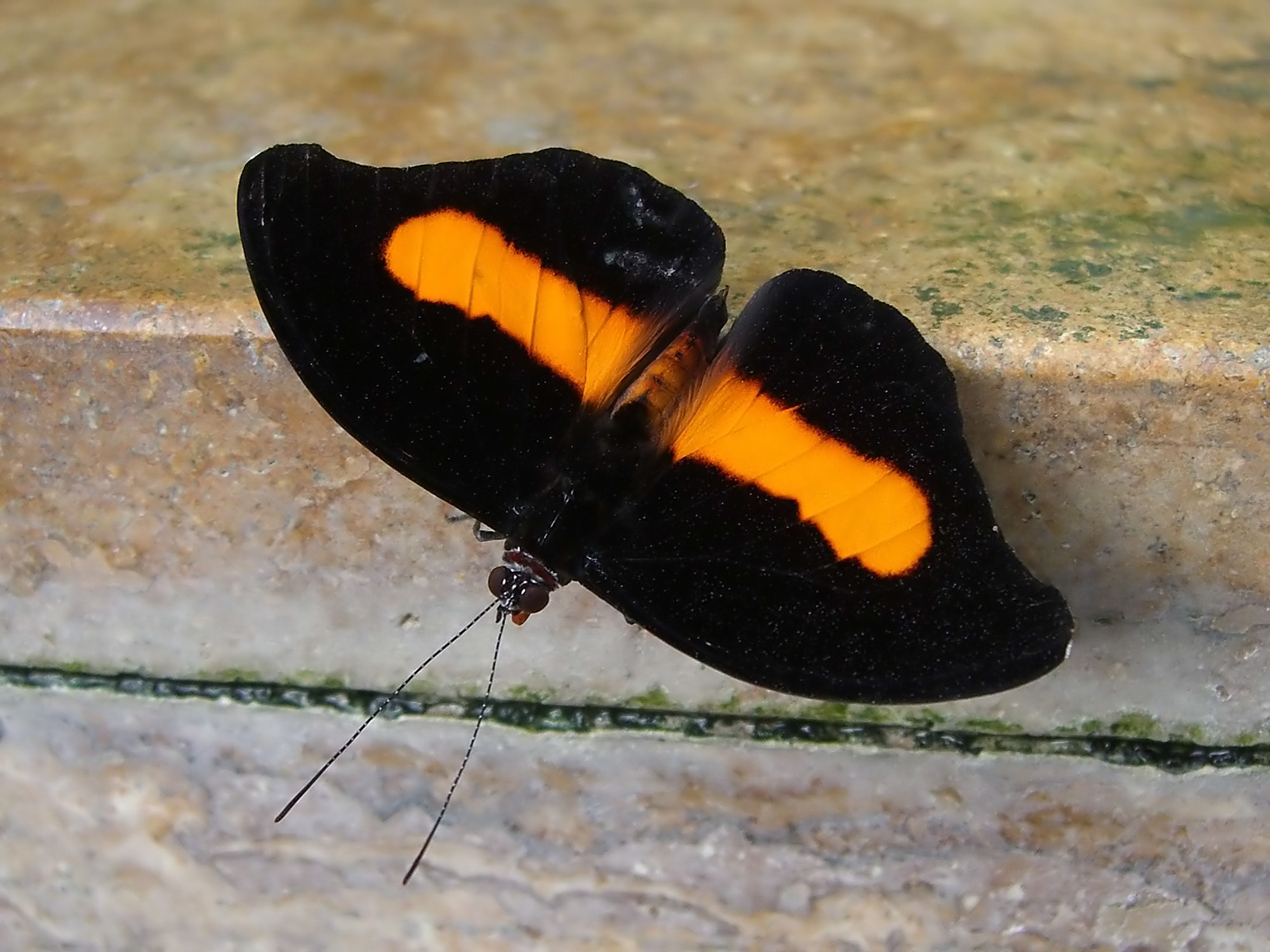
- Male

Scientific classification
- Domain: Eukaryota
- Kingdom: Animalia
- Phylum: Arthropoda
- Class: Insecta
- Order: Lepidoptera
- Family: Nymphalidae
- Genus: Catonephele
- Species: C. orites

Binomial name
- Catonephele orites Stichel, 1899

= Catonephele orites =

Species of butterfly

Catonephele orites, the orange-banded shoemaker butterfly, is a species of butterfly found throughout the northern coast of South America and into Central America.

== Food ==
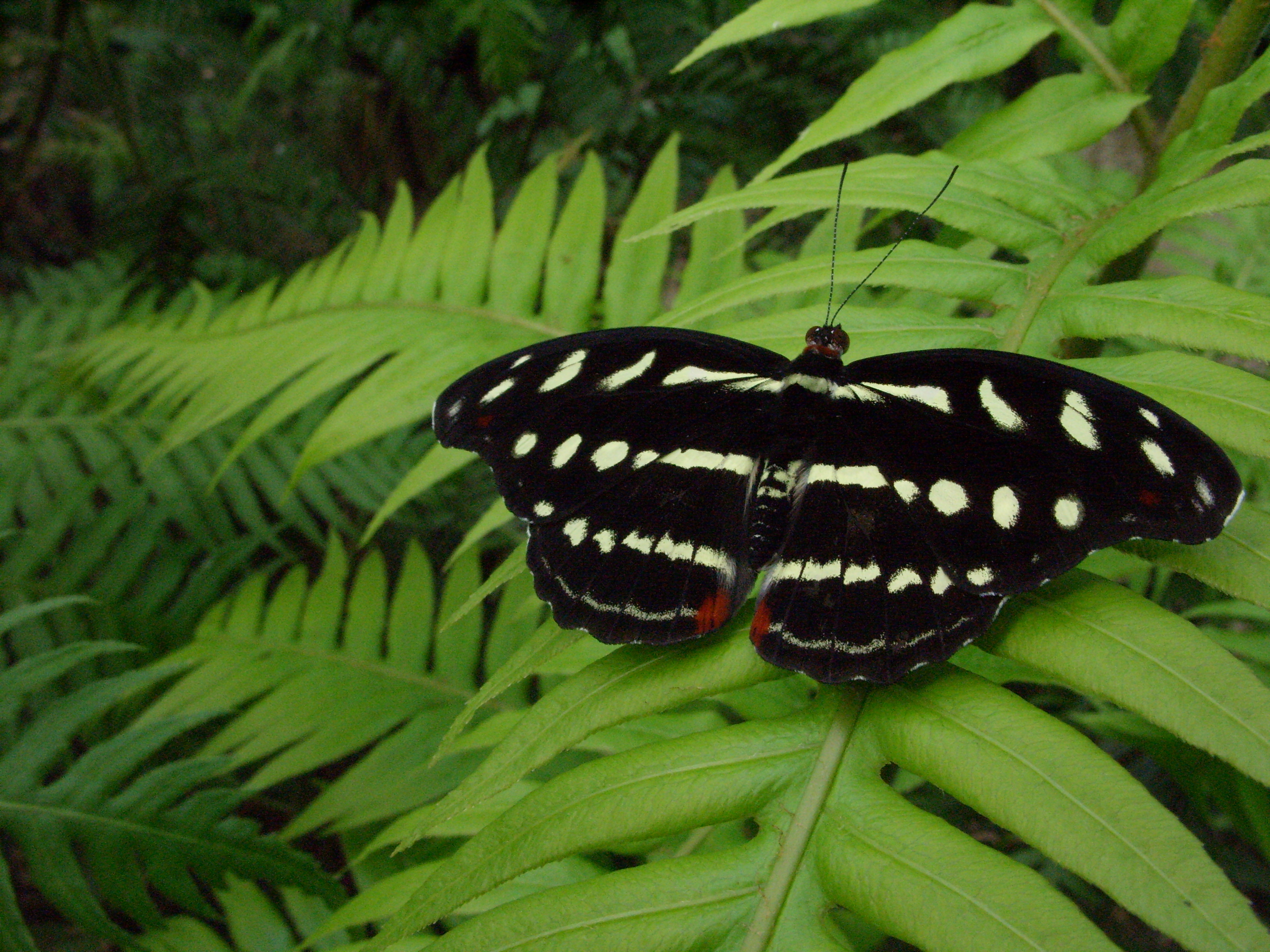
female

Larvae of Catonephele orites have been found on Alchornea.
