= Taua (disambiguation) =

A taua is a war party in the tradition of the Maori, the indigenous people of New Zealand.

Taua may also refer to:

== Places ==
- Tauá, a small municipality in the state of Ceará in the Northeast region of Brazil
- Tauá (Rio de Janeiro), a neighborhood in Rio de Janeiro, Brazil
- Santo Antônio do Tauá, a municipality in the state of Pará in the Northern region of Brazil
- Mata Taua Peak, a peak in Antarctica

== People ==
- Vai Taua (born 1988), American football player
- Wiremu Hoani Taua (1862–1919), New Zealand tribal leader
- Tauã Antunes (born 1995), Brazilian footballer
- Tauã Ferreira dos Santos (born 1993), Brazilian footballer

== Other uses ==
- Taua, a 2007 New Zealand short film written and directed by Tearepa Kahi
- Oenomaus taua, a species of butterfly
- Waka taua, Māori war canoe
