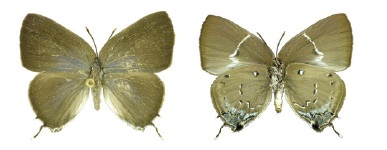
- Female
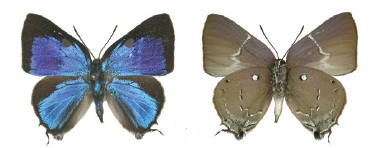
- Male

Scientific classification
- Domain: Eukaryota
- Kingdom: Animalia
- Phylum: Arthropoda
- Class: Insecta
- Order: Lepidoptera
- Family: Lycaenidae
- Genus: Oenomaus
- Species: O. moseri

Binomial name
- Oenomaus moseri Robbins & Faynel, 2012

= Oenomaus moseri =

Species of butterfly

Oenomaus moseri is a species of butterfly of the family Lycaenidae. It occurs in lowland and lower montane forest in southern Brazil.

The length of the forewings is 16.1 mm for males and 15.7 mm for females.

== Etymology ==
The species is named for Alfred Moser, who lives in Rio Grande do Sul and has made prodigious contributions to the knowledge of Lepidoptera from southern Brazil, including co-authoring papers on the taxonomy of Oenomaus and Porthecla.
