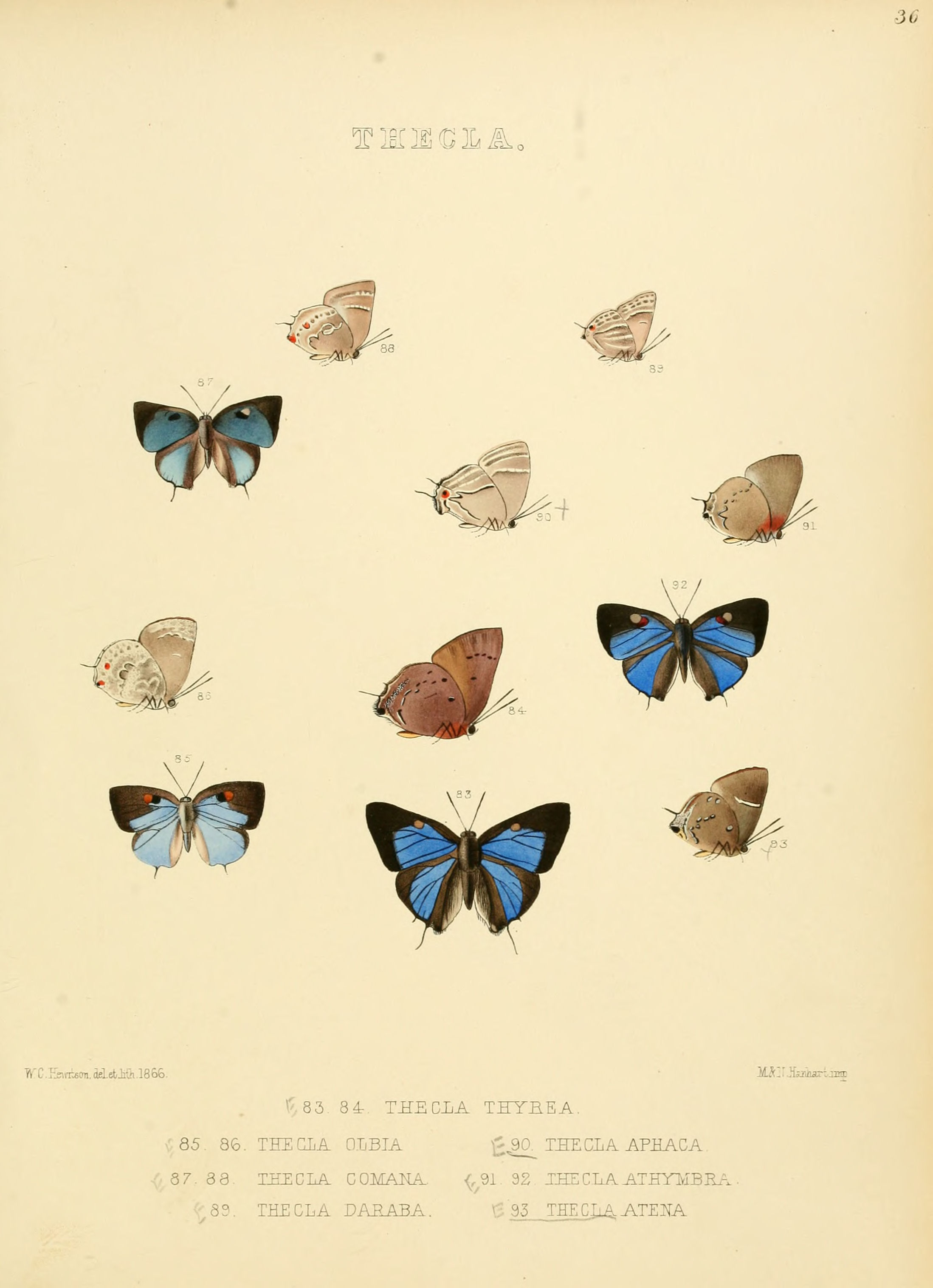
- Thecla atena. Fig. 93 ♂. Accepted as Oenomaus atena (Hewitson, 1867).

Scientific classification
- Domain: Eukaryota
- Kingdom: Animalia
- Phylum: Arthropoda
- Class: Insecta
- Order: Lepidoptera
- Family: Lycaenidae
- Genus: Oenomaus
- Species: O. atena

Binomial name
- Oenomaus atena (Hewitson, 1867)

Synonyms
- Thecla atena Hewitson, 1867

= Oenomaus atena =

Species of butterfly

Oenomaus atena is a species of butterfly of the family Lycaenidae. It is widely distributed in lowland in Costa Rica, Panama, western Ecuador, French Guiana, Venezuela, Peru and Brazil. Most species with an atena-like ventral wing pattern have historically been identified as O. atena, which means that virtually all literature records for this species from before 2005 are unreliable.
