= Oenomaus nigra =

Scientific classification
- Domain: Eukaryota
- Kingdom: Animalia
- Phylum: Arthropoda
- Class: Insecta
- Order: Lepidoptera
- Family: Lycaenidae
- Genus: Oenomaus
- Species: O. nigra

Binomial name
- Oenomaus nigra Faynel & Moser, 2008

Species of butterfly

Oenomaus nigra is a species of butterfly of the family Lycaenidae. It is found in wet lowland forests in Peru and Brazil.
