= Porthecla barba =

Scientific classification
- Domain: Eukaryota
- Kingdom: Animalia
- Phylum: Arthropoda
- Class: Insecta
- Order: Lepidoptera
- Family: Lycaenidae
- Genus: Porthecla
- Species: P. barba

Binomial name
- Porthecla barba (Druce, 1907)

Synonyms
- Thecla barba Druce, 1907; Parrhasius nicanoriana Salazar, 2000; Parrhasius nicandriana Salazar, 2000

Species of butterfly

Porthecla barba is a butterfly in the family Lycaenidae. It is found in northern and western Colombia and western Ecuador at altitudes between 1,375 and 2,300 meters.

The length of the forewings is 18.4 mm for males and 17.5 mm for females.
