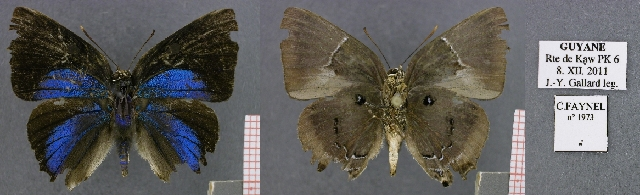

Scientific classification
- Domain: Eukaryota
- Kingdom: Animalia
- Phylum: Arthropoda
- Class: Insecta
- Order: Lepidoptera
- Family: Lycaenidae
- Genus: Oenomaus
- Species: O. isabellae

Binomial name
- Oenomaus isabellae Faynel, 2006

= Oenomaus isabellae =

Species of butterfly

Oenomaus isabellae is a species of butterfly of the family Lycaenidae. It is found in wet and dry lowland forests in French Guiana, Colombia, eastern Ecuador, Peru, Bolivia and Brazil.
