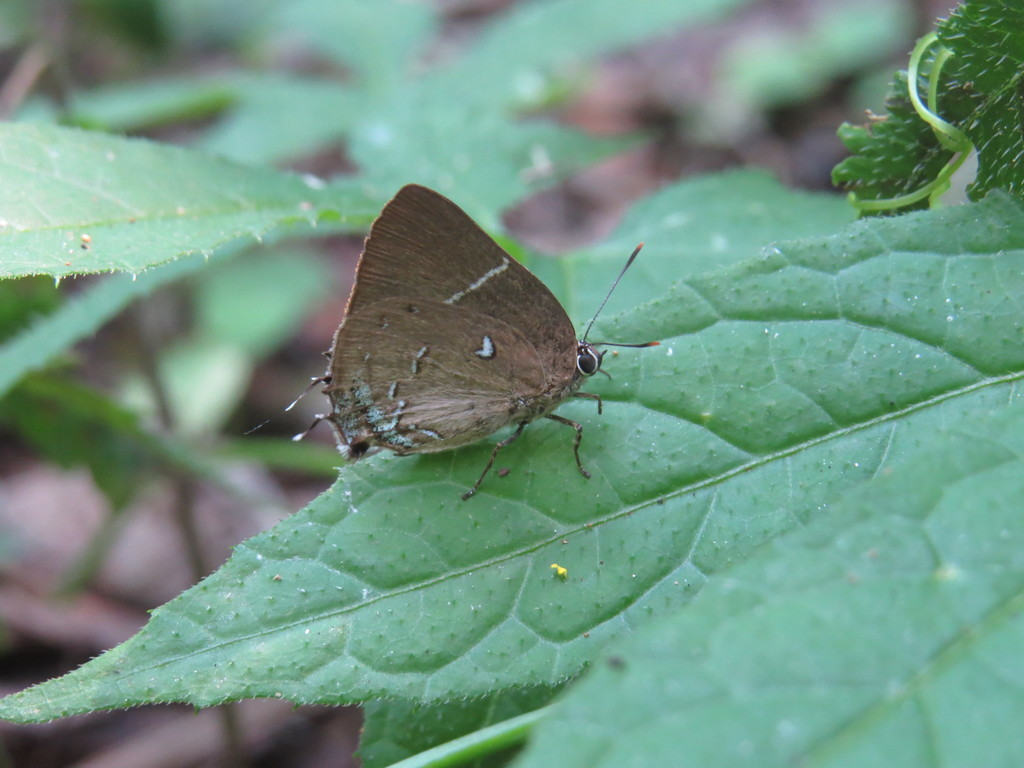

Scientific classification
- Domain: Eukaryota
- Kingdom: Animalia
- Phylum: Arthropoda
- Class: Insecta
- Order: Lepidoptera
- Family: Lycaenidae
- Genus: Oenomaus
- Species: O. morroensis

Binomial name
- Oenomaus morroensis Faynel & Moser, 2008

= Oenomaus morroensis =

Species of butterfly

Oenomaus morroensis is a species of butterfly of the family Lycaenidae. It is found in lower montane and subtropical forests in Brazil.
