= Porthecla peruensis =

Scientific classification
- Domain: Eukaryota
- Kingdom: Animalia
- Phylum: Arthropoda
- Class: Insecta
- Order: Lepidoptera
- Family: Lycaenidae
- Genus: Porthecla
- Species: P. peruensis

Binomial name
- Porthecla peruensis Faynel & Moser, 2011

Species of butterfly

Porthecla peruensis is a butterfly in the family Lycaenidae. It is found in northern Peru, on the east side of the Andes. It appears to be a montane species, since it has only been found at altitudes above 1,500 meters.

The length of the forewings is 15.9 mm for males.

== Etymology ==
The name is derived from the country type locality.
