= Porthecla minyia =

Scientific classification
- Domain: Eukaryota
- Kingdom: Animalia
- Phylum: Arthropoda
- Class: Insecta
- Order: Lepidoptera
- Family: Lycaenidae
- Genus: Porthecla
- Species: P. minyia

Binomial name
- Porthecla minyia (Hewitson 1867)

Synonyms
- Thecla minyia Hewitson 1867; Olynthus minyia

Species of butterfly

Porthecla minyia is a butterfly in the family Lycaenidae. It is found in the Amazon basin and the Guianas at altitudes between 100 and 1,000 meters.

The length of the forewings is 16.2 mm for males and 15.1 mm for females. Adults are on wing in August and December. They feed on the nectar of Cordia schomburgkii.
