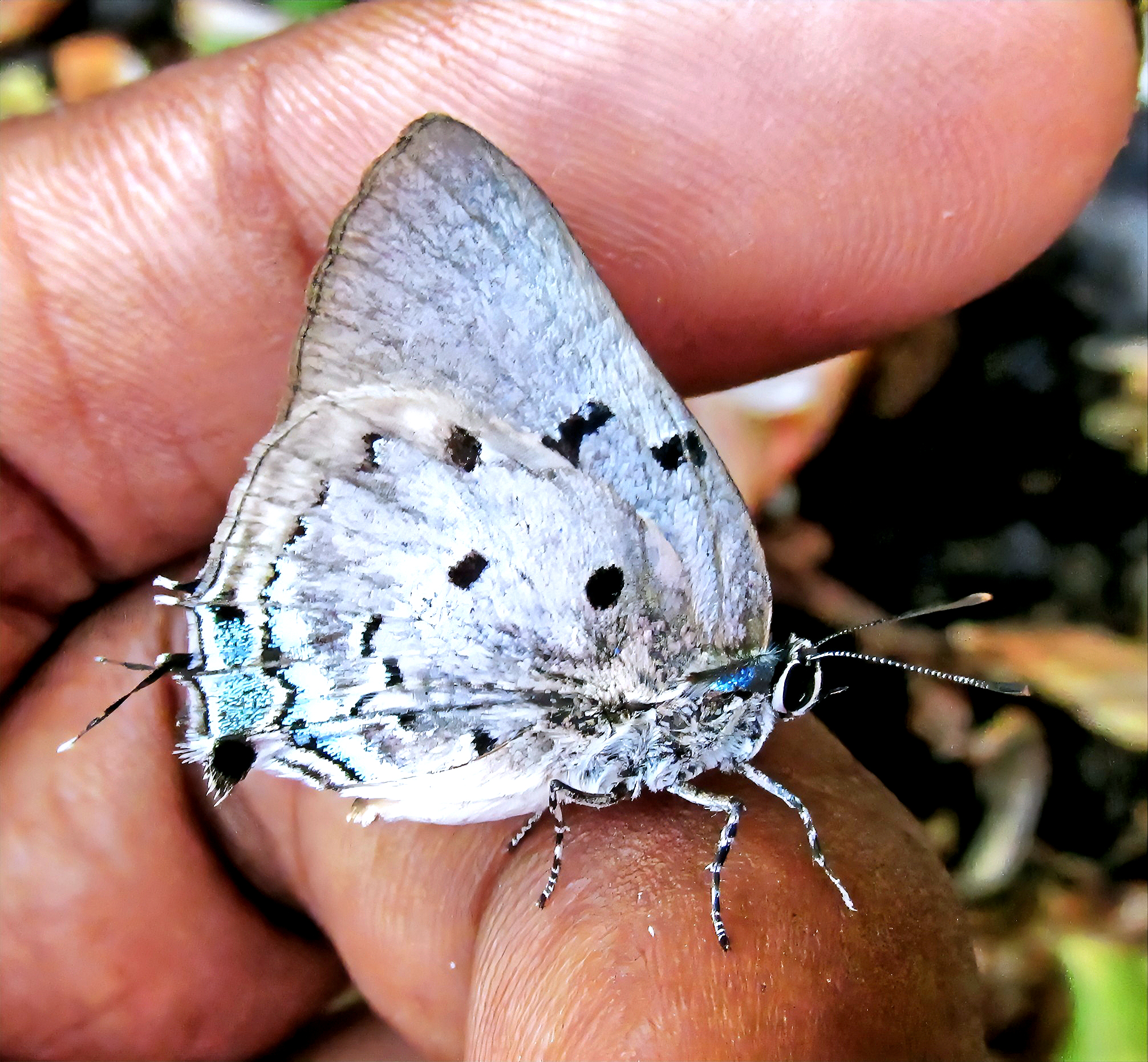

Scientific classification
- Domain: Eukaryota
- Kingdom: Animalia
- Phylum: Arthropoda
- Class: Insecta
- Order: Lepidoptera
- Family: Lycaenidae
- Genus: Oenomaus
- Species: O. ortygnus

Binomial name
- Oenomaus ortygnus (Cramer, 1779)

Synonyms
- Papilio ortygnus Cramer, 1779; Thecla lauta Draudt, 1918

= Oenomaus ortygnus =

Species of butterfly

Oenomaus ortygnus, the aquamarine hairstreak, is a species of butterfly of the family Lycaenidae. It is found from Brazil through Central America to Tamaulipas, Mexico. Rare strays may be found up to southern Texas. The habitat consists of low elevation wet and dry tropical forests.

The wingspan is 30–38 mm.
