= Oenomaus cortica =

Scientific classification
- Domain: Eukaryota
- Kingdom: Animalia
- Phylum: Arthropoda
- Class: Insecta
- Order: Lepidoptera
- Family: Lycaenidae
- Genus: Oenomaus
- Species: O. cortica

Binomial name
- Oenomaus cortica (d'Abrera, 1995)

Synonyms
- Thecla cortica d'Abrera, 1995

Species of butterfly

Oenomaus cortica is a species of butterfly of the family Lycaenidae. It is found in wet lowland forest in Panama, Guyana, Peru and Brazil.
