= Oenomaus ambiguus =

Scientific classification
- Domain: Eukaryota
- Kingdom: Animalia
- Phylum: Arthropoda
- Class: Insecta
- Order: Lepidoptera
- Family: Lycaenidae
- Genus: Oenomaus
- Species: O. ambiguus

Binomial name
- Oenomaus ambiguus Faynel, 2008

Species of butterfly

Oenomaus ambiguus is a species of butterfly of the family Lycaenidae. It is found in French Guiana and Amazonian Peru.
