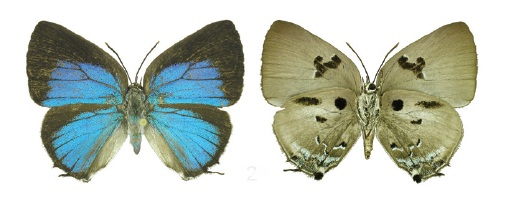
- Female
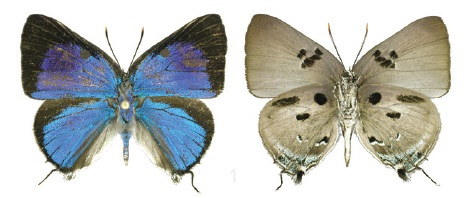
- Male

Scientific classification
- Domain: Eukaryota
- Kingdom: Animalia
- Phylum: Arthropoda
- Class: Insecta
- Order: Lepidoptera
- Family: Lycaenidae
- Genus: Oenomaus
- Species: O. mancha

Binomial name
- Oenomaus mancha Busby & Faynel, 2012

= Oenomaus mancha =

Species of butterfly

Oenomaus mancha is a species of butterfly of the family Lycaenidae. It occurs widely in wet forest in eastern Ecuador at elevations ranging from 400 to 1,100 meters.

The length of the forewings is 20.8 mm for males and 19.4 mm for females. Adult males and females are attracted to traps baited with rotting fish.

== Etymology ==
The name of the species is derived from the Spanish word mancha (meaning spot) and refers to the very distinctive, elongated black spot in ventral hindwing cell Sc+R1-Rs.
