= Porthecla prietoi =

Scientific classification
- Kingdom: Animalia
- Phylum: Arthropoda
- Clade: Pancrustacea
- Class: Insecta
- Order: Lepidoptera
- Family: Lycaenidae
- Genus: Porthecla
- Species: P. prietoi

Binomial name
- Porthecla prietoi Faynel & Busby, 2011

Species of butterfly

Porthecla prietoi is a butterfly in the family Lycaenidae. It is found in western Colombia and western Ecuador at altitudes between 1,000 and 2,200 meters.

The length of the forewings is 19 mm for males and 19 mm for females. Adults are on wing year-round.

== Etymology ==
The species is named Carlos Prieto, a Colombian lepidopterist studying Lycaenidae.
