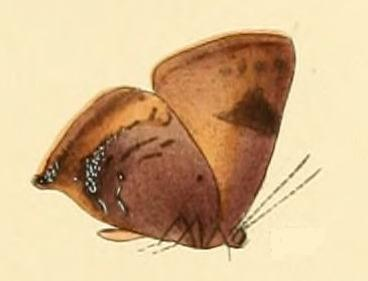

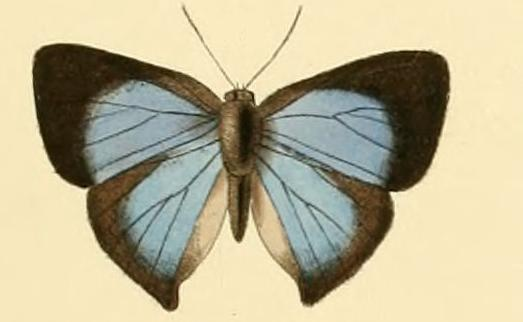

Scientific classification
- Domain: Eukaryota
- Kingdom: Animalia
- Phylum: Arthropoda
- Class: Insecta
- Order: Lepidoptera
- Family: Lycaenidae
- Genus: Porthecla
- Species: P. dinus

Binomial name
- Porthecla dinus (Hewitson, 1867)

Synonyms
- Thecla dinus Hewitson, 1867; Radissima dinus

= Porthecla dinus =

Species of butterfly

Porthecla dinus is a butterfly in the family Lycaenidae. It is found in fragmented montane habitats at altitudes between 600 and 1,800 meters in south-eastern Brazil.

The length of the forewings is 16.7 mm for males and 15.6 mm for females. Adults are on wing from September to April.
