= Porthecla forasteira =

Scientific classification
- Kingdom: Animalia
- Phylum: Arthropoda
- Class: Insecta
- Order: Lepidoptera
- Family: Lycaenidae
- Genus: Porthecla
- Species: P. forasteira

Binomial name
- Porthecla forasteira Faynel & A. Moser, 2011

Species of butterfly

Porthecla forasteira is a butterfly in the family Lycaenidae. It is found in Peru, Bolivia and French Guiana. The habitat consists of lowland areas.

The length of the forewings is 15.9 mm for males.
