= Porthecla annette =

Scientific classification
- Domain: Eukaryota
- Kingdom: Animalia
- Phylum: Arthropoda
- Class: Insecta
- Order: Lepidoptera
- Family: Lycaenidae
- Genus: Porthecla
- Species: P. annette

Binomial name
- Porthecla annette Faynel & R.K. Robbins, 2011

Species of butterfly

Porthecla annette is a butterfly in the family Lycaenidae. It is found in Panama and central Colombia at altitudes under 1,000 meters.

The length of the forewings is 14.2 mm for males and 15 mm for females.
