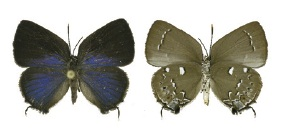
- Female
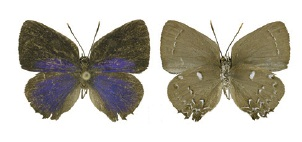
- Male

Scientific classification
- Domain: Eukaryota
- Kingdom: Animalia
- Phylum: Arthropoda
- Class: Insecta
- Order: Lepidoptera
- Family: Lycaenidae
- Genus: Oenomaus
- Species: O. myrteana

Binomial name
- Oenomaus myrteana Busby, Robbins & Faynel, 2012

= Oenomaus myrteana =

Species of butterfly

Oenomaus myrteana is a species of butterfly of the family Lycaenidae. It occurs in lowland wet forest from eastern Ecuador to western Brazil (Rondônia).

The length of the forewings is 12.8 mm for males and 12.1 mm for females.

== Etymology ==
The name of the species refers to the striking resemblance between the ventral hindwing of this species and that of Enos myrtea.
