= Oenomaus poirieri =

Scientific classification
- Domain: Eukaryota
- Kingdom: Animalia
- Phylum: Arthropoda
- Class: Insecta
- Order: Lepidoptera
- Family: Lycaenidae
- Genus: Oenomaus
- Species: O. poirieri

Binomial name
- Oenomaus poirieri Faynel, 2008

Species of butterfly

Oenomaus poirieri is a species of butterfly of the family Lycaenidae. It is found in wet lowland forests in French Guiana and Brazil.
