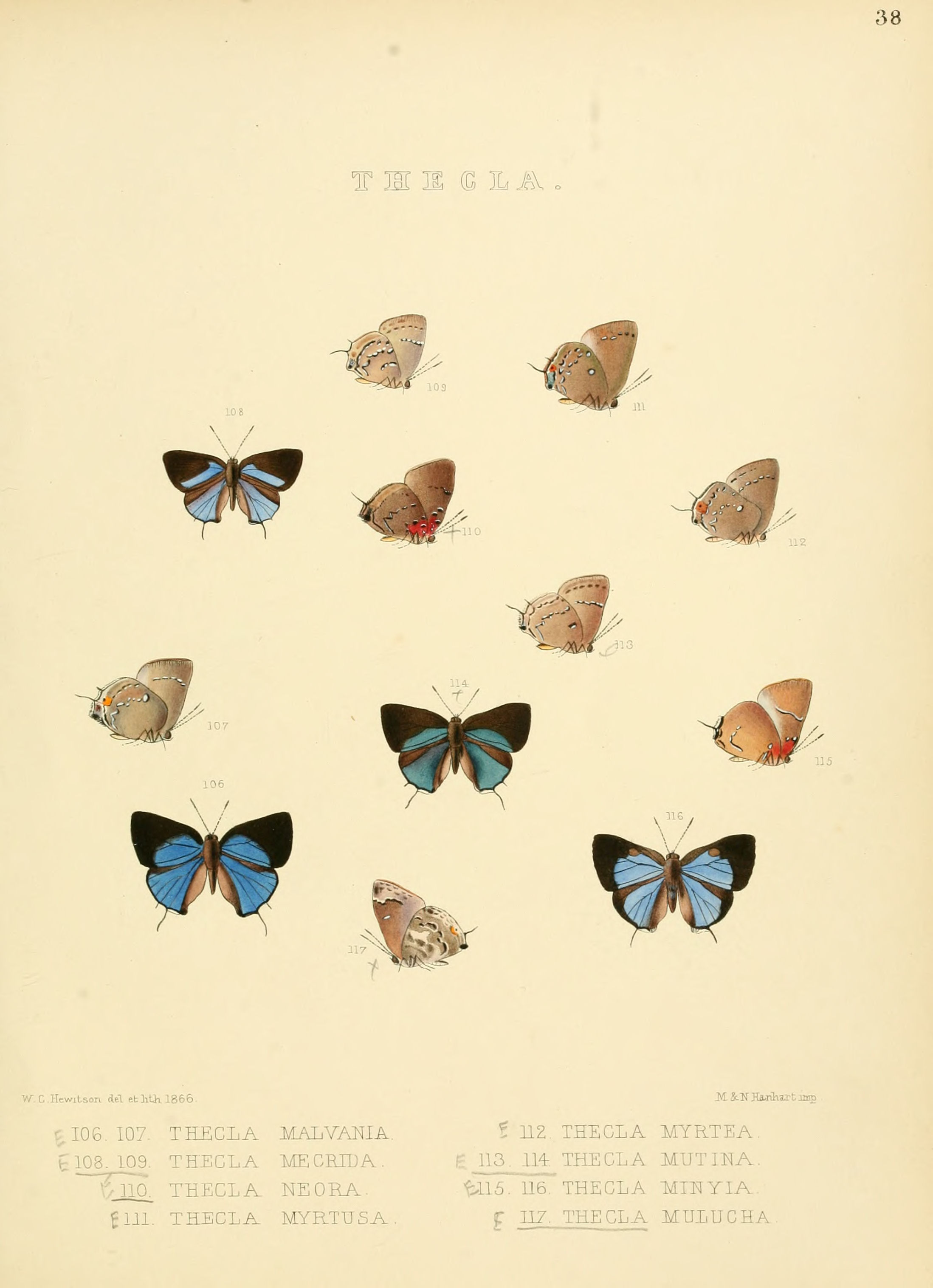
- Porthecla minyia and other Lycaenidae in William Chapman Hewitson's Illustrations of Diurnal Lepidoptera

Scientific classification
- Domain: Eukaryota
- Kingdom: Animalia
- Phylum: Arthropoda
- Class: Insecta
- Order: Lepidoptera
- Family: Lycaenidae
- Tribe: Eumaeini
- Genus: Porthecla; Robbins, 2004

= Porthecla =

Butterfly genus in family Lycaenidae

Porthecla is a Neotropical genus of butterflies in the family Lycaenidae.

== Species ==
- Porthecla annette Faynel & R.K. Robbins, 2011
- Porthecla barba (Druce, 1907)
- Porthecla dinus (Hewitson, 1867)
- Porthecla forasteira Faynel & A. Moser, 2011
- Porthecla gemma (Druce, 1907)
- Porthecla johanna Faynel & R.K. Robbins, 2011
- Porthecla minyia (Hewitson, 1867)
- Porthecla peruensis Faynel & A. Moser, 2011
- Porthecla porthura (Druce, 1907)
- Porthecla prietoi Faynel & Busby, 2011
- Porthecla ravus (Druce, 1907)
- Porthecla willmotti Busby, Faynel & A. Moser, 2011

== Former species ==
- Oenomaus melleus (Druce, 1907)
