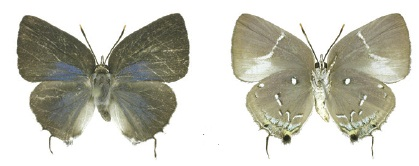

Scientific classification
- Domain: Eukaryota
- Kingdom: Animalia
- Phylum: Arthropoda
- Class: Insecta
- Order: Lepidoptera
- Family: Lycaenidae
- Genus: Oenomaus
- Species: O. brulei

Binomial name
- Oenomaus brulei Faynel, 2008

= Oenomaus brulei =

Species of butterfly

Oenomaus brulei is a species of butterfly of the family Lycaenidae. It is found in the lowlands of French Guiana.
