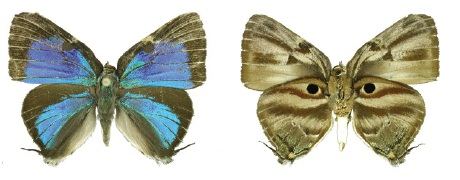

Scientific classification
- Domain: Eukaryota
- Kingdom: Animalia
- Phylum: Arthropoda
- Class: Insecta
- Order: Lepidoptera
- Family: Lycaenidae
- Genus: Oenomaus
- Species: O. lea

Binomial name
- Oenomaus lea Faynel & Robbins, 2012

= Oenomaus lea =

Species of butterfly

Oenomaus lea is a species of butterfly of the family Lycaenidae. It occurs in wet lowland forest up to 1,200 meters elevation in eastern Ecuador and eastern Peru.

The length of the forewings is 18.2 mm for males.
