= Oenomaus floreus =

Scientific classification
- Domain: Eukaryota
- Kingdom: Animalia
- Phylum: Arthropoda
- Class: Insecta
- Order: Lepidoptera
- Family: Lycaenidae
- Genus: Oenomaus
- Species: O. floreus

Binomial name
- Oenomaus floreus (Druce, 1907)

Synonyms
- Thecla floreus Druce, 1907

Species of butterfly

Oenomaus floreus is a species of butterfly of the family Lycaenidae. It is found in lowland and lower montane habitats with wet or deciduous forests in eastern Ecuador and Brazil.
