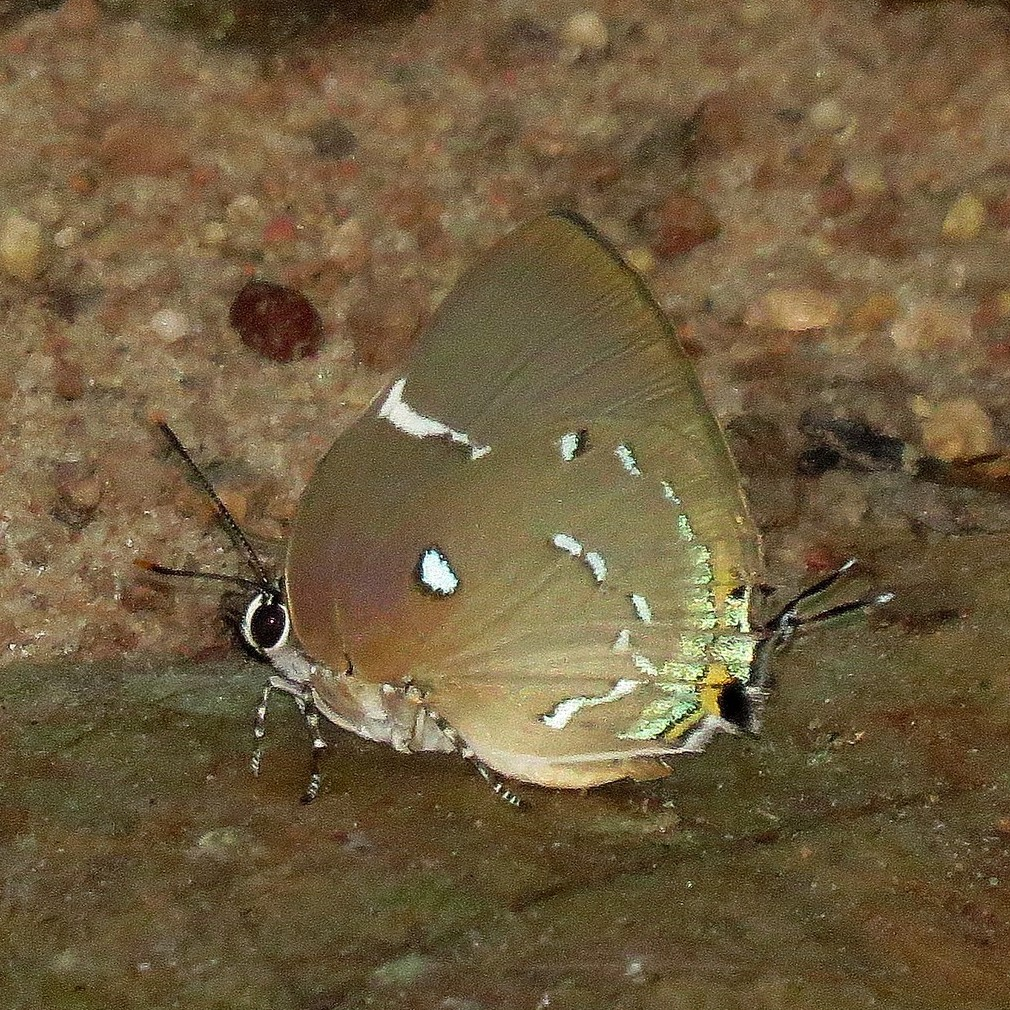

Scientific classification
- Kingdom: Animalia
- Phylum: Arthropoda
- Clade: Pancrustacea
- Class: Insecta
- Order: Lepidoptera
- Family: Lycaenidae
- Genus: Oenomaus
- Species: O. druceus

Binomial name
- Oenomaus druceus Faynel & Moser, 2008

= Oenomaus druceus =

Species of butterfly

Oenomaus druceus is a species of butterfly in the family Lycaenidae. It is found in Brazil.
