= Porthecla johanna =

Scientific classification
- Domain: Eukaryota
- Kingdom: Animalia
- Phylum: Arthropoda
- Class: Insecta
- Order: Lepidoptera
- Family: Lycaenidae
- Genus: Porthecla
- Species: P. johanna

Binomial name
- Porthecla johanna Faynel & Robbins, 2011

Species of butterfly

Porthecla johanna is a butterfly in the family Lycaenidae. It is found in Peru and Ecuador in wet lowland forests at altitudes between 400 and 600 meters.

The length of the forewings is 15.5 mm for males. Adults are on wing year-round.
