= Oenomaus atesa =

Scientific classification
- Domain: Eukaryota
- Kingdom: Animalia
- Phylum: Arthropoda
- Class: Insecta
- Order: Lepidoptera
- Family: Lycaenidae
- Genus: Oenomaus
- Species: O. atesa

Binomial name
- Oenomaus atesa (Hewitson, 1867)

Synonyms
- Thecla atesa Hewitson, 1867; Thecla ocelligera J. & W. Zikán, 1968

Species of butterfly

Oenomaus atesa is a species of butterfly of the family Lycaenidae. It is a widespread species that has been recorded from Mexico, Panama, western Ecuador, French Guiana, Venezuela, Colombia, eastern Ecuador, Peru and Brazil.
