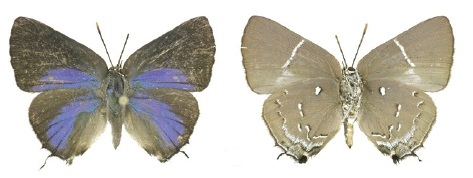

Scientific classification
- Domain: Eukaryota
- Kingdom: Animalia
- Phylum: Arthropoda
- Class: Insecta
- Order: Lepidoptera
- Family: Lycaenidae
- Genus: Oenomaus
- Species: O. magnus

Binomial name
- Oenomaus magnus Faynel & Moser, 2008

= Oenomaus magnus =

Species of butterfly

Oenomaus magnus is a species of butterfly of the family Lycaenidae. It is found in lowland forests in French Guiana, Peru, Bolivia and Brazil.
