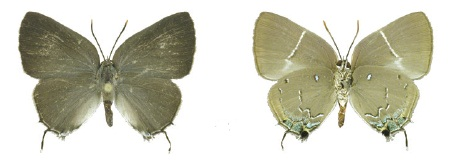

Scientific classification
- Domain: Eukaryota
- Kingdom: Animalia
- Phylum: Arthropoda
- Class: Insecta
- Order: Lepidoptera
- Family: Lycaenidae
- Genus: Oenomaus
- Species: O. cyanovenata

Binomial name
- Oenomaus cyanovenata (d'Abrera, 1995)

Synonyms
- Thecla cyanovenata d'Abrera, 1995

= Oenomaus cyanovenata =

Species of butterfly

Oenomaus cyanovenata is a species of butterfly of the family Lycaenidae. It is found in very wet lowland forests in Costa Rica, Panama, French Guiana, Venezuela, Bolivia and Brazil.

Larvae have been reared on Guatteria verrucosa.
