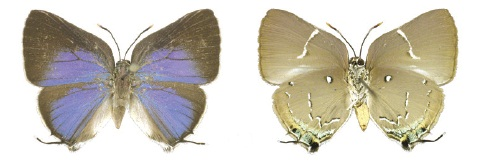

Scientific classification
- Domain: Eukaryota
- Kingdom: Animalia
- Phylum: Arthropoda
- Class: Insecta
- Order: Lepidoptera
- Family: Lycaenidae
- Genus: Oenomaus
- Species: O. gaia

Binomial name
- Oenomaus gaia Faynel, 2008

= Oenomaus gaia =

Species of butterfly

Oenomaus gaia is a species of butterfly of the family Lycaenidae. It is found in wet and dry lowland forests in Panama, French Guiana, Venezuela, eastern Ecuador, Peru and Brazil.
