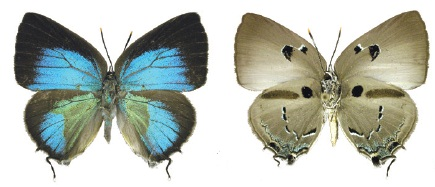

Scientific classification
- Domain: Eukaryota
- Kingdom: Animalia
- Phylum: Arthropoda
- Class: Insecta
- Order: Lepidoptera
- Family: Lycaenidae
- Genus: Oenomaus
- Species: O. gwenish

Binomial name
- Oenomaus gwenish Robbins & Faynel, 2012

= Oenomaus gwenish =

Species of butterfly

Oenomaus gwenish is a species of butterfly of the family Lycaenidae. It is probably a lower montane species, so far known only from wet forest at 1,000 meters elevation in Darién, Panama.

The length of the forewings is 20 mm for females.

== Etymology ==
The species is named for entomologist Dr. Jennifer (Gwen) Shlichta.
