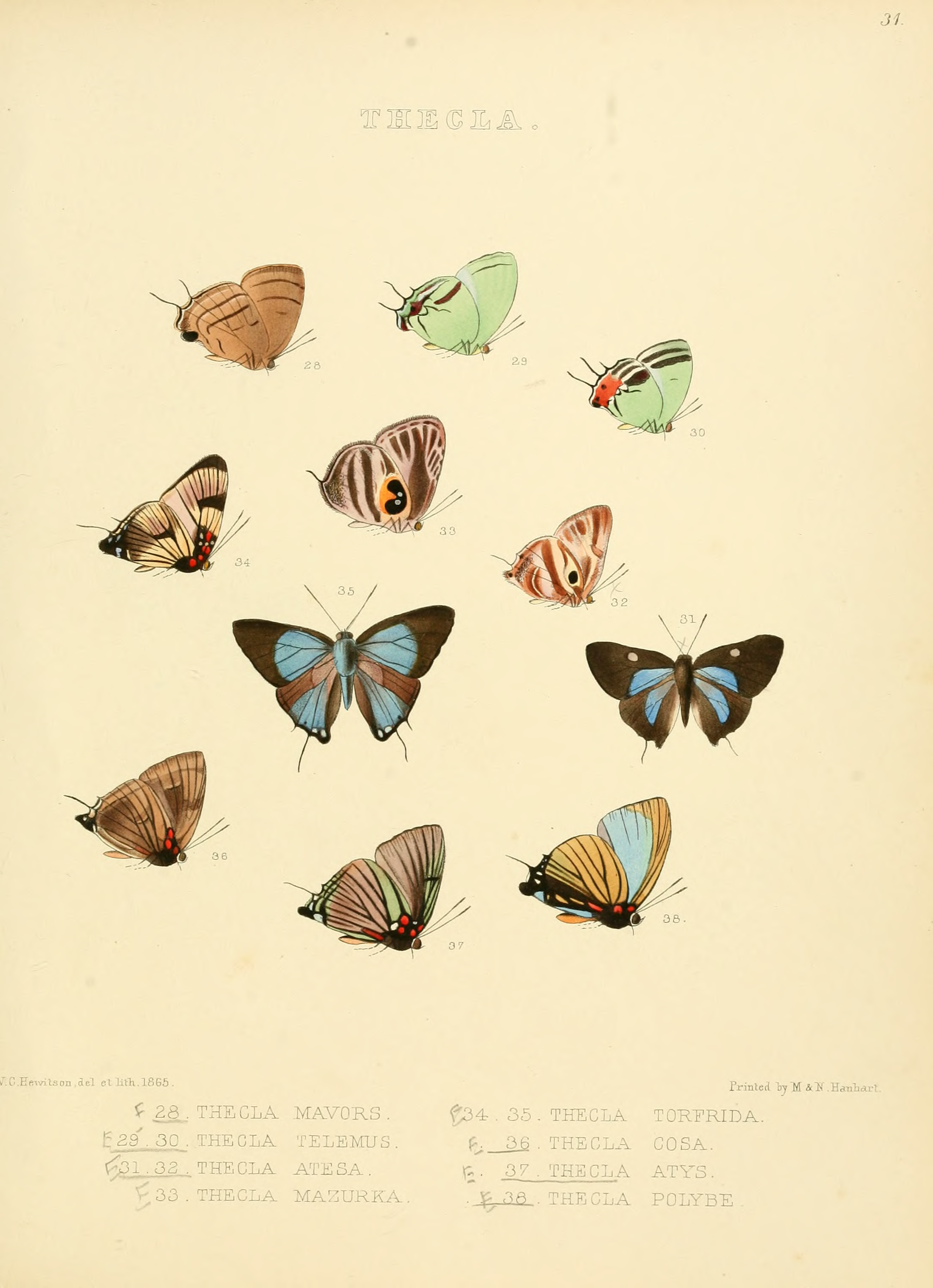
- Oenomaus atesa, figures 31 and 32

Scientific classification
- Domain: Eukaryota
- Kingdom: Animalia
- Phylum: Arthropoda
- Class: Insecta
- Order: Lepidoptera
- Family: Lycaenidae
- Tribe: Eumaeini
- Genus: Oenomaus; Hübner, [1819]

Synonyms
- Draudtiana Kesselring & Ebert, [1982]

= Oenomaus (butterfly) =

Butterfly genus in family Lycaenidae

Oenomaus is a genus of butterflies in the family Lycaenidae. The species of this genus are found in the Neotropical realm.

== Species ==
- atena species subgroup
  - Oenomaus atena (Hewitson, 1867)
  - Oenomaus morroensis Faynel & Moser, 2008
- cortica species subgroup
  - Oenomaus ambiguus Faynel, 2008
  - Oenomaus cortica (D'Abrera, 1995)
  - Oenomaus druceus Faynel & Moser, 2008
  - Oenomaus gaia Faynel, 2008
- curiosa species subgroup
  - Oenomaus curiosa Faynel & Moser, 2008
- cyanovenata species subgroup
  - Oenomaus cyanovenata (D'Abrera, 1995)
  - Oenomaus floreus (Druce, 1907)
  - Oenomaus isabellae Faynel, 2006
  - Oenomaus taua Faynel & Moser, 2008
- geba species subgroup
  - Oenomaus brulei Faynel, 2008
  - Oenomaus geba (Hewitson, 1877)
  - Oenomaus griseus Faynel & Moser, 2008
  - Oenomaus jauffreti Faynel & Moser, 2008
  - Oenomaus magnus Faynel & Moser, 2008
  - Oenomaus poirieri Faynel, 2008
- melleus species subgroup
  - Oenomaus melleus (Druce, 1907)
- nigra species subgroup
  - Oenomaus nigra Faynel & Moser, 2008
- unknown species subgroup
  - Oenomaus andi Busby & Faynel, 2012
  - Oenomaus atesa (Hewitson, 1867)
  - Oenomaus gwenish Robbins & Faynel, 2012
  - Oenomaus lea Faynel & Robbins, 2012
  - Oenomaus mancha Busby & Faynel, 2012
  - Oenomaus mentirosa Faynel & Robbins, 2012
  - Oenomaus moseri Robbins & Faynel, 2012
  - Oenomaus myrteana Busby, Robbins & Faynel, 2012
  - Oenomaus ortygnus (Cramer, 1779)
