= Porthecla gemma =

Scientific classification
- Domain: Eukaryota
- Kingdom: Animalia
- Phylum: Arthropoda
- Class: Insecta
- Order: Lepidoptera
- Family: Lycaenidae
- Genus: Porthecla
- Species: P. gemma

Binomial name
- Porthecla gemma (Druce, 1907)

Synonyms
- Thecla gemma Druce, 1907

Species of butterfly

Porthecla gemma is a butterfly in the family Lycaenidae. It is found in the Amazon basin and the Guianas at altitudes between 100 and 1,000 meters.

The length of the forewings is 14.6 mm for males and 13.9 mm for females. Adults are on wing year-round.
