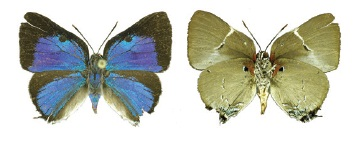

Scientific classification
- Domain: Eukaryota
- Kingdom: Animalia
- Phylum: Arthropoda
- Class: Insecta
- Order: Lepidoptera
- Family: Lycaenidae
- Genus: Oenomaus
- Species: O. mentirosa

Binomial name
- Oenomaus mentirosa Faynel & Robbins, 2012

= Oenomaus mentirosa =

Species of butterfly

Oenomaus mentirosa is a species of butterfly of the family Lycaenidae. It occurs in lowland wet forest in Amazonian Peru.

The length of the forewings is 14.9 mm for males.
