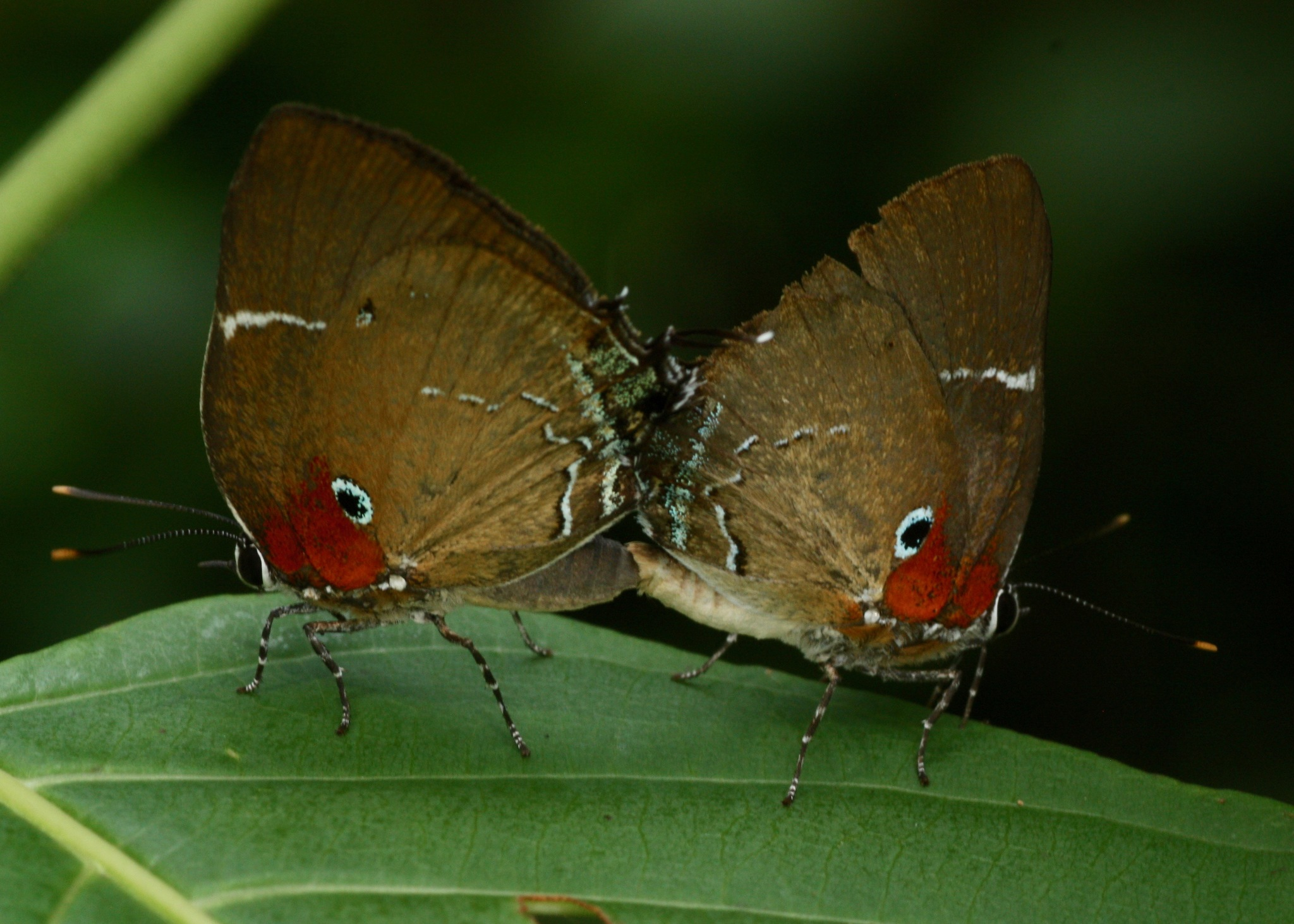
- Mating pair

Scientific classification
- Kingdom: Animalia
- Phylum: Arthropoda
- Clade: Pancrustacea
- Class: Insecta
- Order: Lepidoptera
- Family: Lycaenidae
- Genus: Porthecla
- Species: P. porthura

Binomial name
- Porthecla porthura (Druce, 1907)

Synonyms
- Thecla porthura Druce, 1907

= Porthecla porthura =

Species of butterfly

Porthecla porthura is a species of butterfly in the family Lycaenidae. It is found from Honduras to western Ecuador in forests up to altitudes of 1,150 meters.

The length of the forewings is 17.7 mm for males and 17.3 mm for females. Adults are on wing year-round.
