= Porthecla ravus =

Scientific classification
- Domain: Eukaryota
- Kingdom: Animalia
- Phylum: Arthropoda
- Class: Insecta
- Order: Lepidoptera
- Family: Lycaenidae
- Genus: Porthecla
- Species: P. ravus

Binomial name
- Porthecla ravus (Druce 1907)

Synonyms
- Thecla ravus Druce, 1907

Species of butterfly

Porthecla ravus is a butterfly in the family Lycaenidae. It is found in the Amazon basin and southern Brazil.

The length of the forewings is 14.5 mm for males and 13.6 mm for females. Adults are on wing year-round. They feed on the nectar of Cordia schomburgkii.
