= Porthecla willmotti =

Scientific classification
- Domain: Eukaryota
- Kingdom: Animalia
- Phylum: Arthropoda
- Class: Insecta
- Order: Lepidoptera
- Family: Lycaenidae
- Genus: Porthecla
- Species: P. willmotti

Binomial name
- Porthecla willmotti Busby, Faynel & Moser, 2011

Species of butterfly

Porthecla willmotti is a butterfly in the family Lycaenidae. It is found in eastern Ecuador and eastern Peru at altitudes between 1,500 and 2,200 meters.

The length of the forewings is 18.2 mm for males and 18.1 mm for females. Adults are on wing from August to November.
