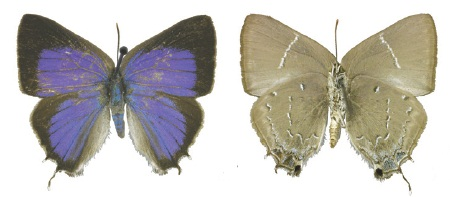

Scientific classification
- Domain: Eukaryota
- Kingdom: Animalia
- Phylum: Arthropoda
- Class: Insecta
- Order: Lepidoptera
- Family: Lycaenidae
- Genus: Oenomaus
- Species: O. geba

Binomial name
- Oenomaus geba (Hewitson, 1877)

Synonyms
- Thecla geba Hewitson, 1877

= Oenomaus geba =

Species of butterfly

Oenomaus geba is a species of butterfly of the family Lycaenidae. It is found in lower montane forests in southern Brazil (Santa Catarina).
