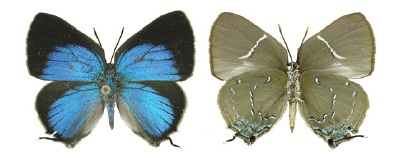
- Female
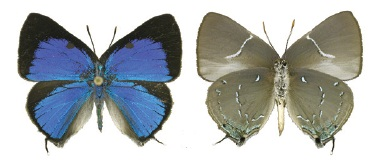
- Male

Scientific classification
- Domain: Eukaryota
- Kingdom: Animalia
- Phylum: Arthropoda
- Class: Insecta
- Order: Lepidoptera
- Family: Lycaenidae
- Genus: Oenomaus
- Species: O. andi

Binomial name
- Oenomaus andi Busby & Faynel, 2012

= Oenomaus andi =

Species of butterfly

Oenomaus andi is a species of butterfly of the family Lycaenidae. It occurs in montane forest (at altitudes above 1,300 meters) from Ecuador to Bolivia.

The length of the forewings is 16.3 mm for males and 16.7 mm for females. Adult males and females are attracted to traps baited with rotting fish.

== Etymology ==
The species is named for Andrea (Andi) Busby, wife of Robert Busby.
