= Oenomaus melleus =

Scientific classification
- Domain: Eukaryota
- Kingdom: Animalia
- Phylum: Arthropoda
- Class: Insecta
- Order: Lepidoptera
- Family: Lycaenidae
- Genus: Oenomaus
- Species: O. melleus

Binomial name
- Oenomaus melleus (Druce, 1907)

Synonyms
- Thecla melleus Druce, 1907; Oenomaus melleus guyanensis Faynel, 2008

Species of butterfly

Oenomaus melleus is a species of butterfly of the family Lycaenidae. It is found in wet lowland forests in Nicaragua, Costa Rica, French Guiana, Guyana, Venezuela, Colombia, Peru, Bolivia and Brazil.
