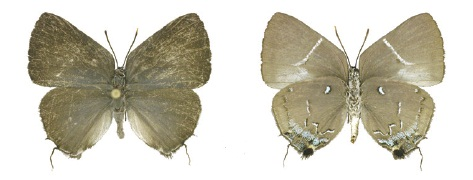

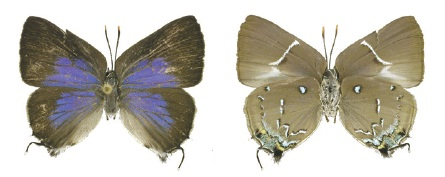

Scientific classification
- Domain: Eukaryota
- Kingdom: Animalia
- Phylum: Arthropoda
- Class: Insecta
- Order: Lepidoptera
- Family: Lycaenidae
- Genus: Oenomaus
- Species: O. taua

Binomial name
- Oenomaus taua Faynel & Moser, 2008

= Oenomaus taua =

Species of butterfly

Oenomaus taua is a species of butterfly of the family Lycaenidae. It is found in wet lowland forests in Guatemala, Panama, French Guiana, eastern Ecuador, Peru and Brazil.
