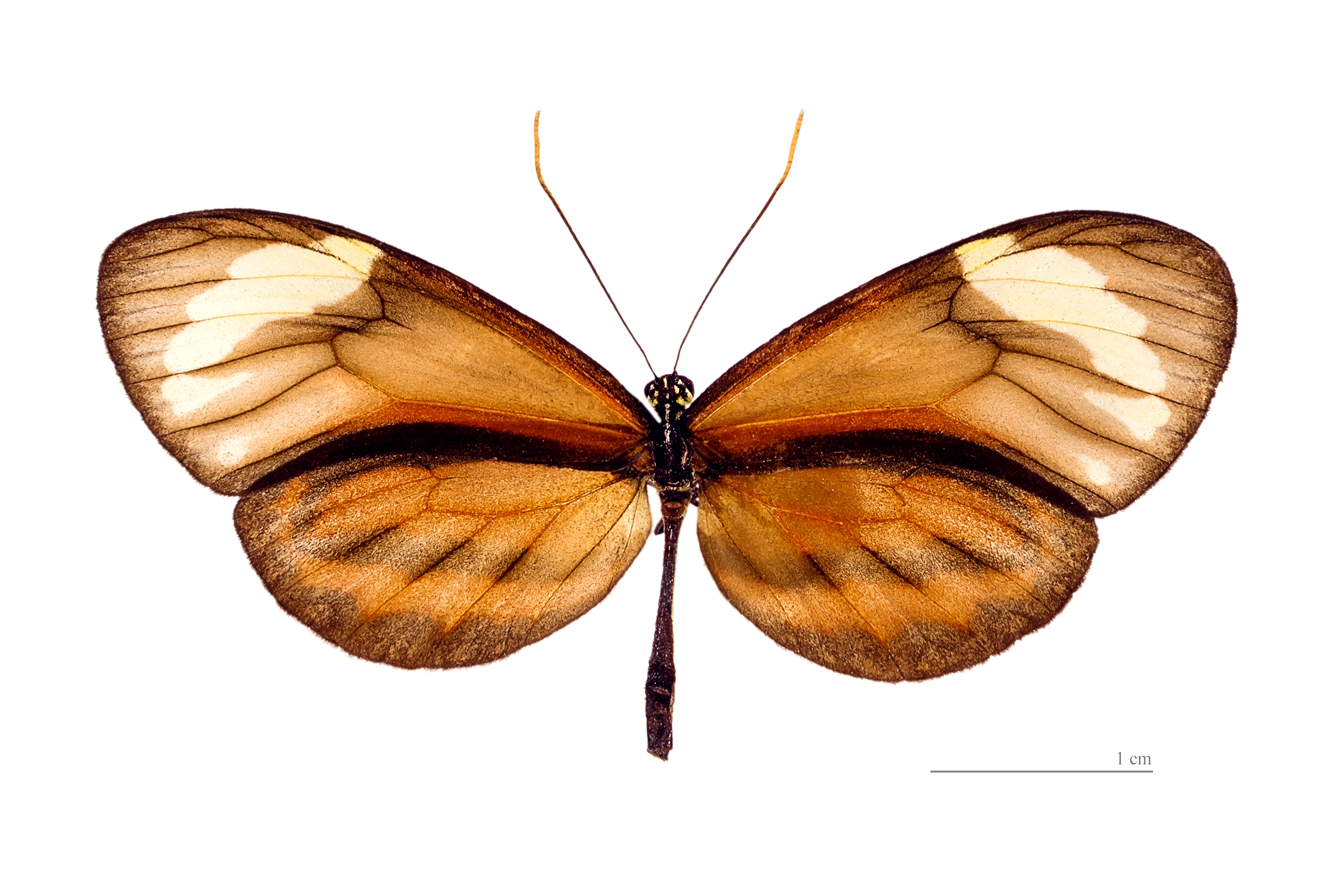
- Dorsal view
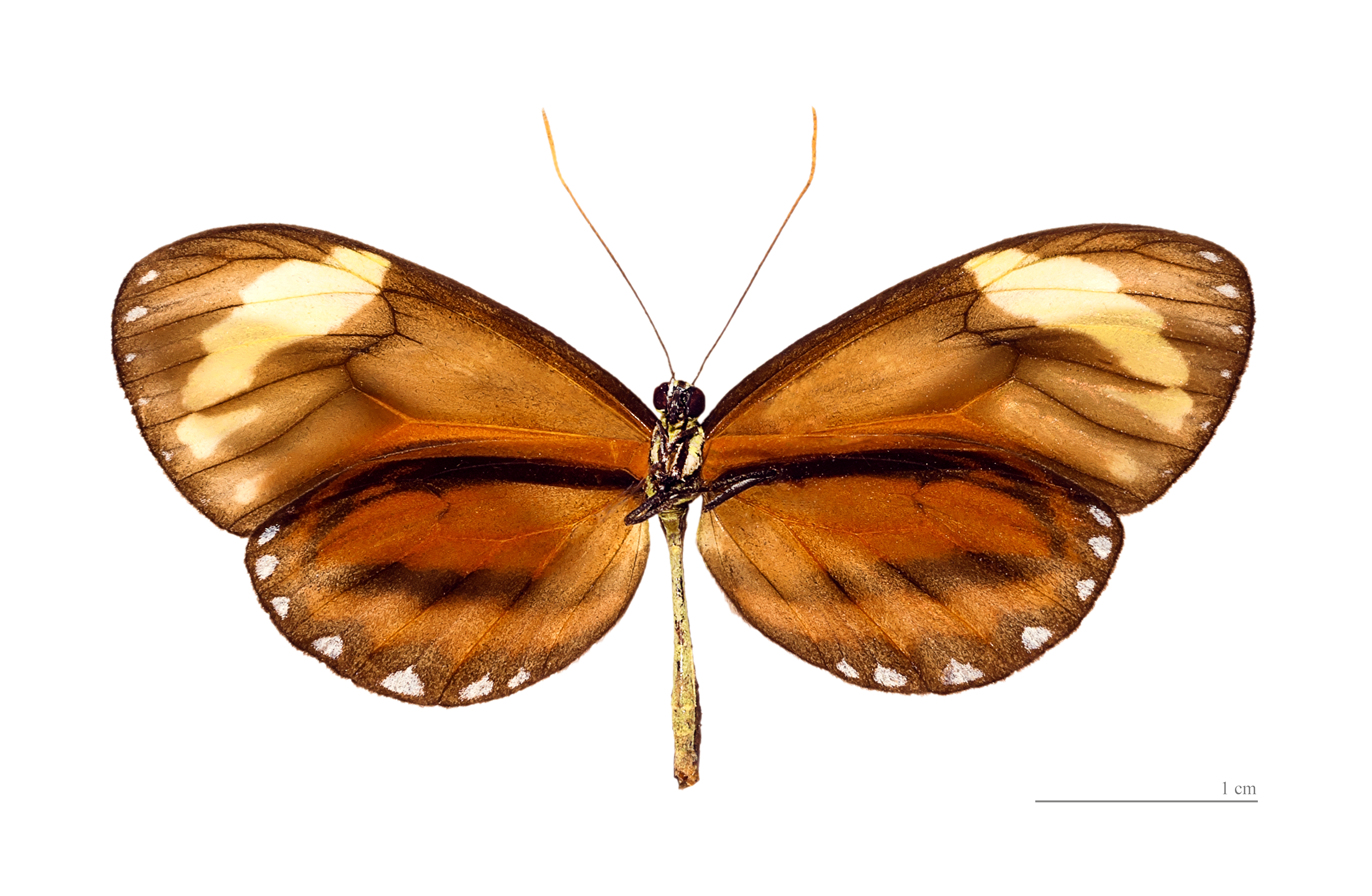
- Ventral view

Scientific classification
- Kingdom: Animalia
- Phylum: Arthropoda
- Class: Insecta
- Order: Lepidoptera
- Family: Nymphalidae
- Genus: Ceratinia
- Species: C. neso

Binomial name
- Ceratinia neso (Hübner, 1806)

Synonyms
- Nereis neso Hübner, [1806]; Ceratinia nise zikani d'Almeida, 1956; Heliconia neso nisea Godart, 1819; Papilio nise Cramer, [1779]; Papilio selene Stoll, [1780]; Ithomia espriella Hewitson, 1868; Ceratinia bisulca Fox, 1945; Calloleria peruensis Haensch, 1905; Calloleria nise tucumana Köhler, 1929; Ithomia hamlini Weeks, 1906; Calloleria neso tarapotis Haensch, 1909; Calloleria neso niselina Zikán, 1941; Ceratinia nise gabriella Bryk, 1953

= Ceratinia neso =

Neso tigerwing

Species of butterfly

Ceratinia neso, the Neso tigerwing, is a species of butterfly of the family Nymphalidae. It is found in South America.

The wingspan is 46–50 mm.

== Subspecies ==
- Ceratinia neso neso (Brazil)
- Ceratinia neso espriella (Hewitson, 1868) (Ecuador)
- Ceratinia neso hamlini (Weeks, 1906) (Venezuela)
- Ceratinia neso nisea (Godart, 1819) (Suriname, Guianas)
- Ceratinia neso niselina (Zikán, 1941) (Brazil: Amazonas)
- Ceratinia neso peruensis (Haensch, 1905) (Peru)
- Ceratinia neso tarapotis (Haensch, 1909) (Peru)
