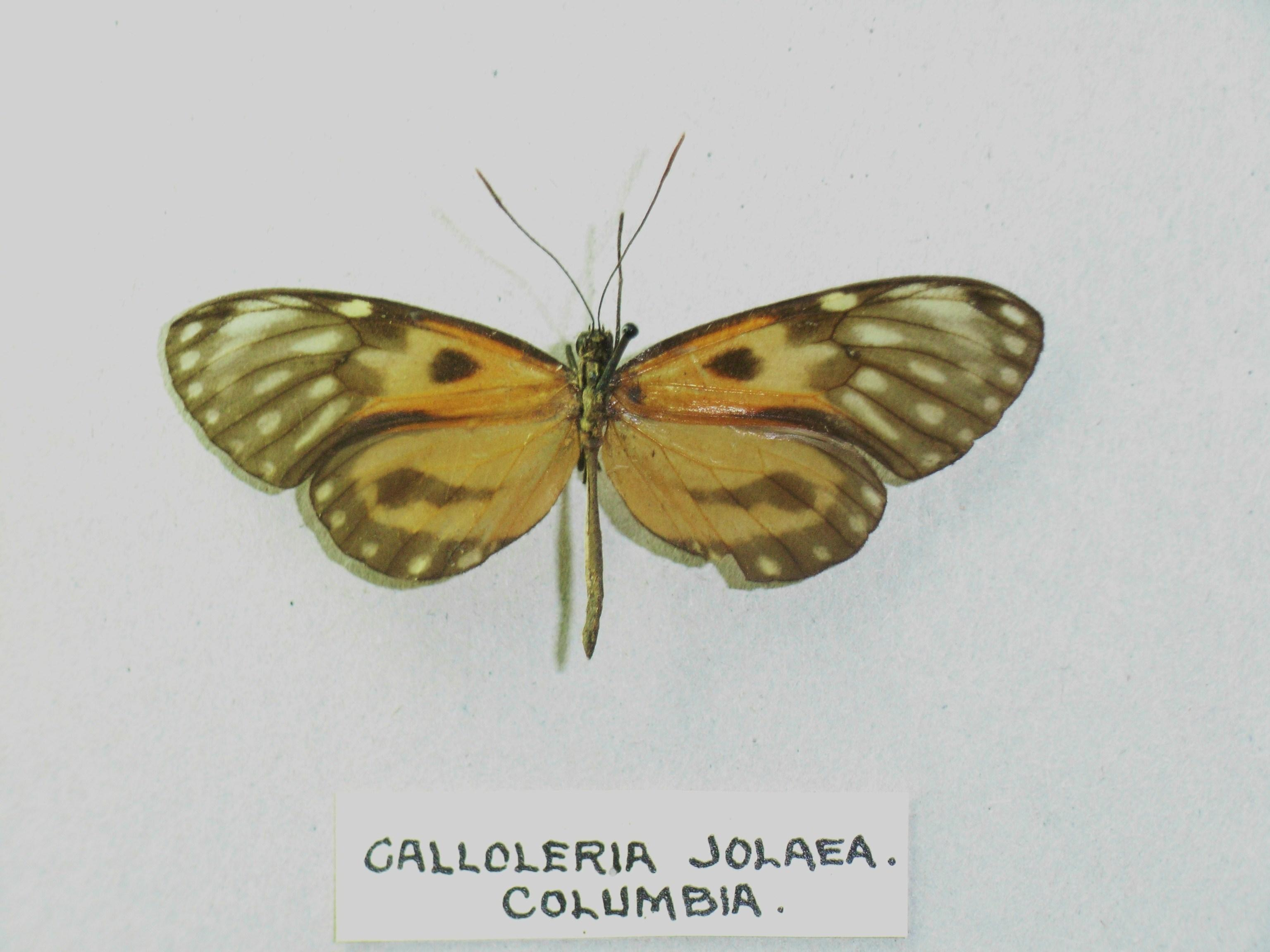

Scientific classification
- Domain: Eukaryota
- Kingdom: Animalia
- Phylum: Arthropoda
- Class: Insecta
- Order: Lepidoptera
- Family: Nymphalidae
- Genus: Ceratinia
- Species: C. iolaia

Binomial name
- Ceratinia iolaia (Hewitson, 1856)

Synonyms
- Ithomia iolaia Hewitson, 1856; Calloleria jolaia ab. conveniens Haensch, 1905

= Ceratinia iolaia =

Species of butterfly

Ceratinia iolaia is a species of butterfly of the family Nymphalidae. It is found in Colombia.

== Subspecies ==
- Ceratinia iolaia iolaia (Colombia)
- Ceratinia iolaia coneniens Bryk, 1937 (Colombia)
- Ceratinia iolaia rehni Fox, 1941 (Colombia)
