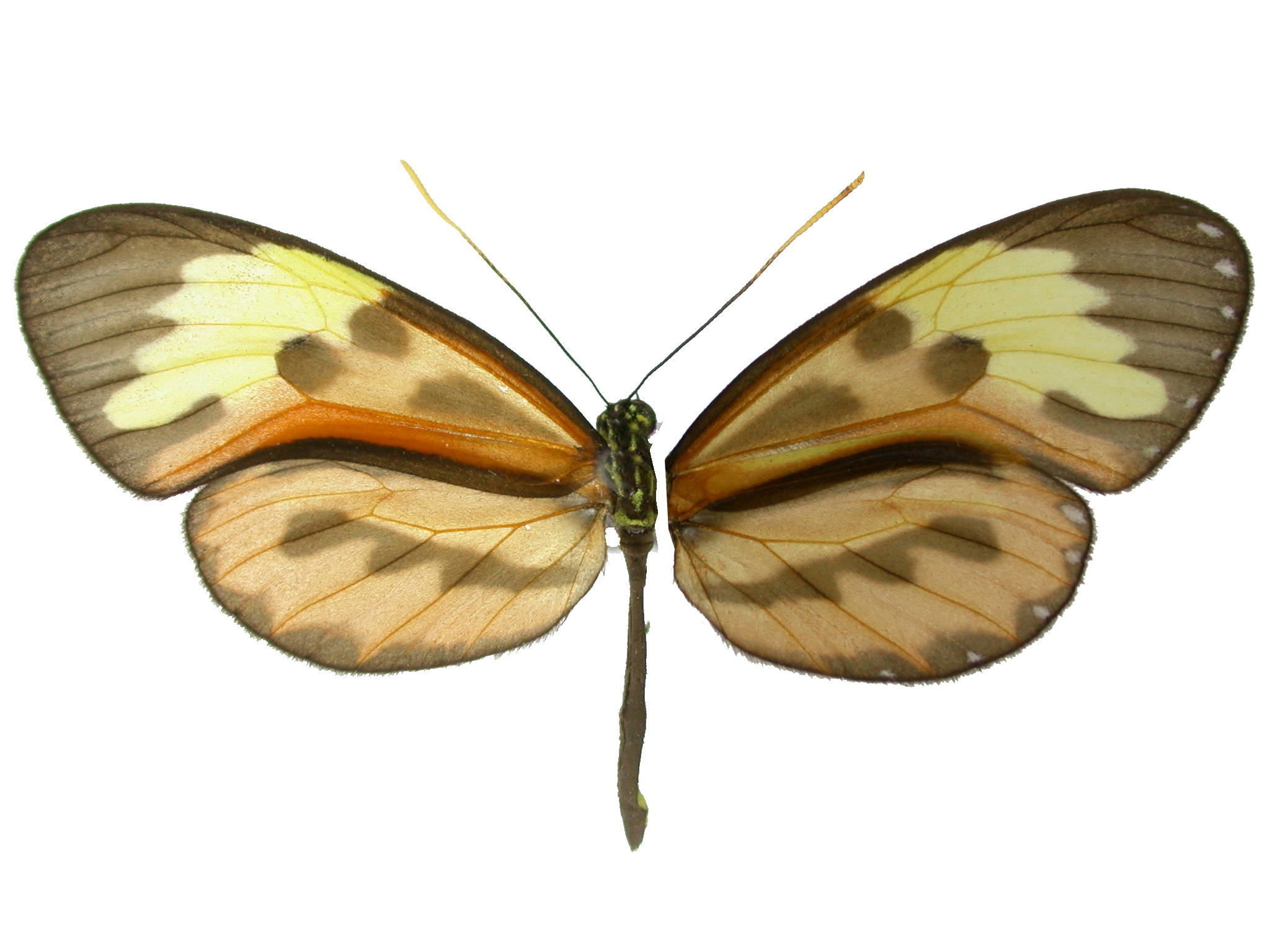
- Ceratinia tutia

Scientific classification
- Domain: Eukaryota
- Kingdom: Animalia
- Phylum: Arthropoda
- Class: Insecta
- Order: Lepidoptera
- Family: Nymphalidae
- Tribe: Ithomiini
- Genus: Ceratinia; Hübner, 1816

Species
- See text

Synonyms
- Calloleria Godman & Salvin, [1879]; Epileria Rebel, 1902; Teracinia Röber, 1930

= Ceratinia =

Genus of brush-footed butterflies

Ceratinia is a genus of clearwing (ithomiine) butterflies, named by Jacob Hübner in 1816. They are in the brush-footed butterfly family, Nymphalidae.

== Species ==
Arranged alphabetically:

- Ceratinia cayana (Salvin, 1869)
- Ceratinia iolaia (Hewitson, 1856)
- Ceratinia neso (Hübner, [1806])
- Ceratinia tutia (Hewitson, 1852)
