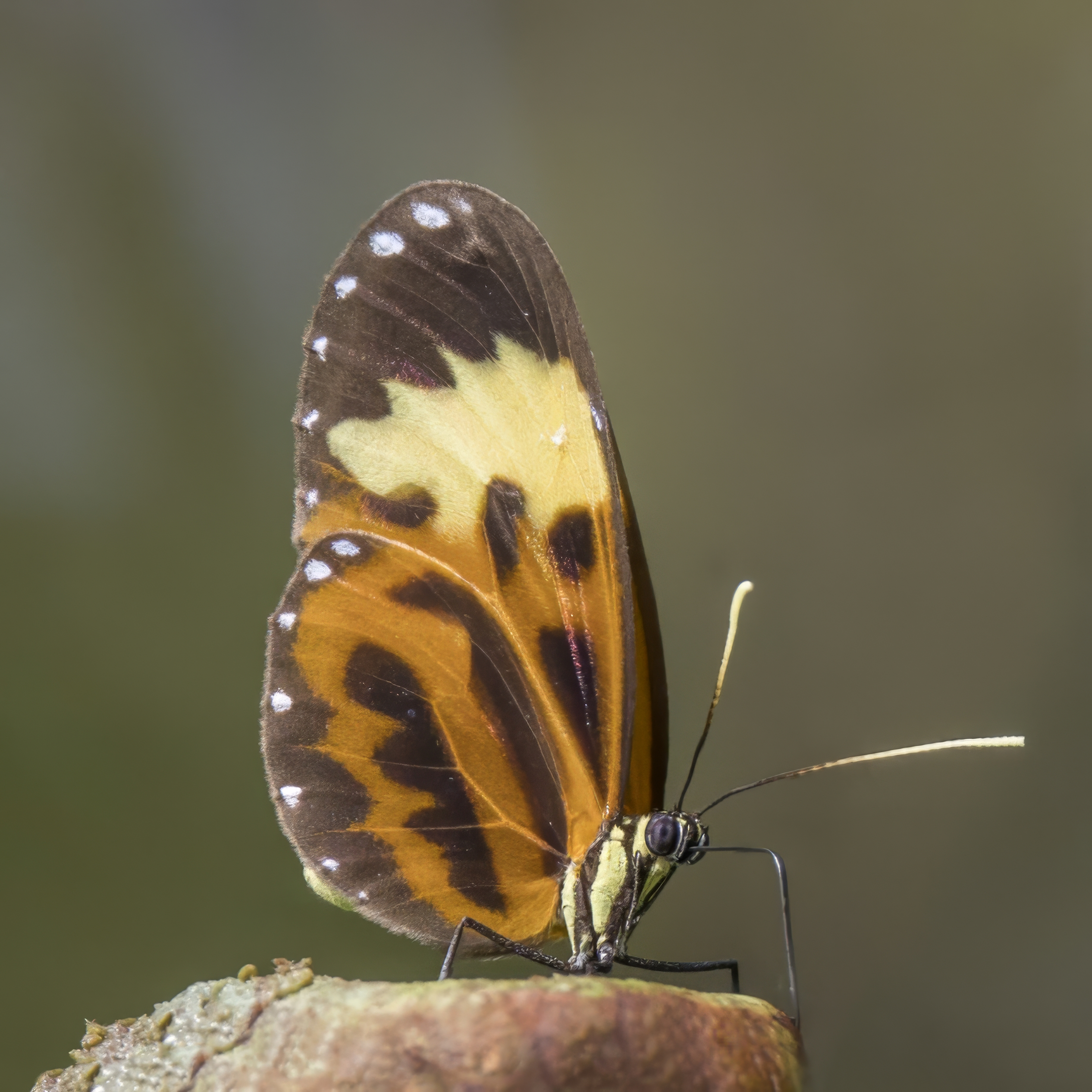
- in Ecuador

Scientific classification
- Domain: Eukaryota
- Kingdom: Animalia
- Phylum: Arthropoda
- Class: Insecta
- Order: Lepidoptera
- Family: Nymphalidae
- Genus: Ceratinia
- Species: C. tutia

Binomial name
- Ceratinia tutia (Hewitson, 1852)

Synonyms
- Ithomia tutia Hewitson, 1852; Ithomia azara Hewitson, 1854; Ithomia poecila Bates, 1862; Ithomia dorilla Bates, 1864; Dircenna tutia callichroma Staudinger, 1885; Calloleria azarina Weymer, 1899; Calloleria poecila ab. poecilana Haensch, 1903; Calloleria poecila ab. nigronascens Haensch, 1905; Calloleria hopfferi Weymer, 1899; Calloleria hopfferi f. onoma Haensch, 1909; Calloleria selenides Weymer, 1899; Ithomia (Epileria) singularis Rebel, 1902; Calloleria tosca Schaus, 1902; Calloleria radiosa Haensch, 1903; Calloleria chanchamaya Haensch, 1905; Calloleria fuscens Haensch, 1905; Calloleria porrecta Haensch, 1905; Calloleria robusta Haensch, 1905; Calloleria selenides poeciloides Riley, 1919; Calloleria tutia transversa Hering, 1925

= Ceratinia tutia =

Tutia clearwing

Species of butterfly

Ceratinia tutia, the tutia clearwing, is a species of butterfly of the family Nymphalidae. It is found from southern Mexico to Brazil. The wingspan is about 52 mm. It is a highly variable species. The larvae of subspecies Ceratinia tutia dorilla have been recorded feeding on Solanum species, including S. antillarum.

== Subspecies ==
- Ceratinia tutia tutia; Venezuela
- Ceratinia tutia azarina (Weymer, 1899); Ecuador and Peru
- Ceratinia tutia callichroma (Staudinger, 1885); Ecuador
- Ceratinia tutia chanchamaya (Haensch, 1905); Peru
- Ceratinia tutia dorilla (Bates, 1864); Nicaragua and Venezuela
- Ceratinia tutia fuscens (Haensch, 1905); Bolivia
- Ceratinia tutia hopfferi (Weymer, 1899); Peru
- Ceratinia tutia poecila (Bates, 1862); Ecuador and Colombia
- Ceratinia tutia poeciloides (Riley, 1919); Brazil
- Ceratinia tutia porrecta (Haensch, 1905); Bolivia
- Ceratinia tutia radiosa (Haensch, 1903); Ecuador
- Ceratinia tutia robusta (Haensch, 1905); Bolivia
- Ceratinia tutia selenides (Weymer, 1899); Peru
- Ceratinia tutia singularis (Rebel, 1902); Ecuador
- Ceratinia tutia tosca (Schaus, 1902); Colombia
- Ceratinia tutia transversa (Hering, 1925); Colombia
