= Ceratinia cayana =

Scientific classification
- Kingdom: Animalia
- Phylum: Arthropoda
- Clade: Pancrustacea
- Class: Insecta
- Order: Lepidoptera
- Family: Nymphalidae
- Genus: Ceratinia
- Species: C. cayana

Binomial name
- Ceratinia cayana (Salvin, 1869)

Synonyms
- Ithomia cayana Salvin, 1869

Species of butterfly

Ceratinia cayana is a species of butterfly of the family Nymphalidae. It is found in Brazil, Suriname and the Guianas, particularly pertinent in French Guiana.

== Subspecies ==
- Ceratinia cayana cayana (Suriname and the Guianas)
- Ceratinia cayana giparanaensis d'Almeida, 1964 (Brazil)
