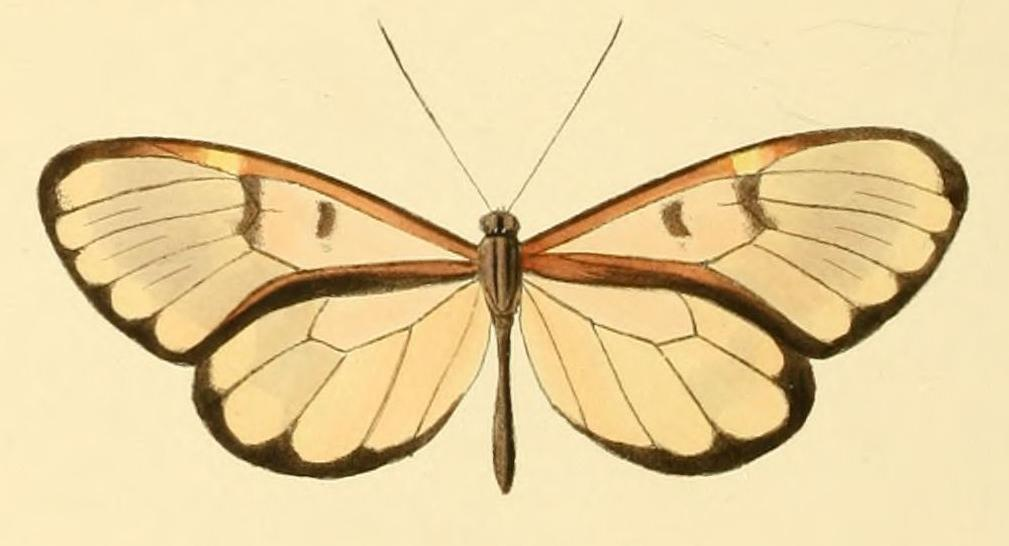

Scientific classification
- Domain: Eukaryota
- Kingdom: Animalia
- Phylum: Arthropoda
- Class: Insecta
- Order: Lepidoptera
- Family: Nymphalidae
- Genus: Godyris
- Species: G. crinippa

Binomial name
- Godyris crinippa (Hewitson, 1874)

Synonyms
- Ithomia crinippa Hewitson, 1874

= Godyris crinippa =

Species of butterfly

Godyris crinippa is a species of butterfly of the family Nymphalidae. It is found in Bolivia and Peru.

== Subspecies ==
- Godyris crinippa crinippa (Bolivia)
- Godyris crinippa new subspecies (Peru)
