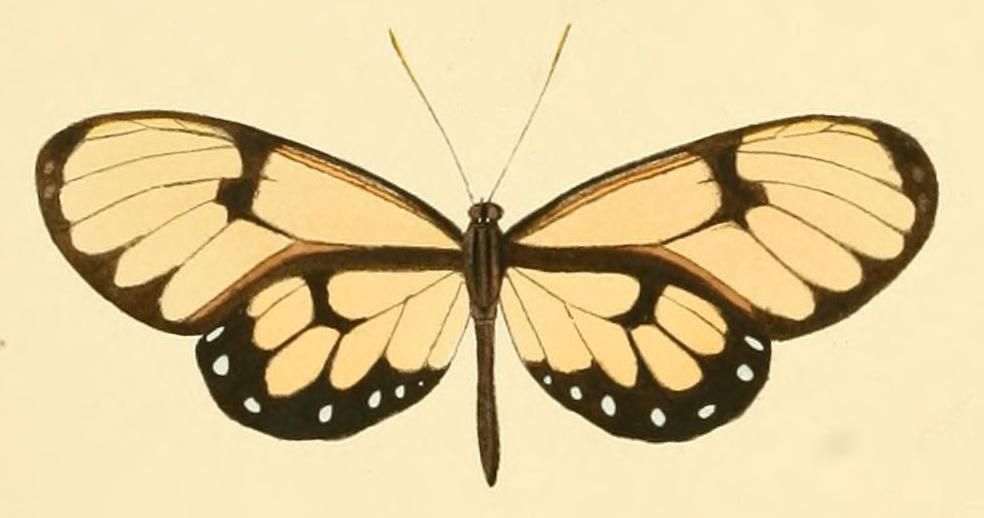

Scientific classification
- Domain: Eukaryota
- Kingdom: Animalia
- Phylum: Arthropoda
- Class: Insecta
- Order: Lepidoptera
- Family: Nymphalidae
- Genus: Godyris
- Species: G. cleomella

Binomial name
- Godyris cleomella (Hewitson, 1874)

Synonyms
- Ithomia cleomella Hewitson, 1874

= Godyris cleomella =

Species of butterfly

Godyris cleomella is a species of butterfly of the family Nymphalidae. It is found in Bolivia and Peru.
