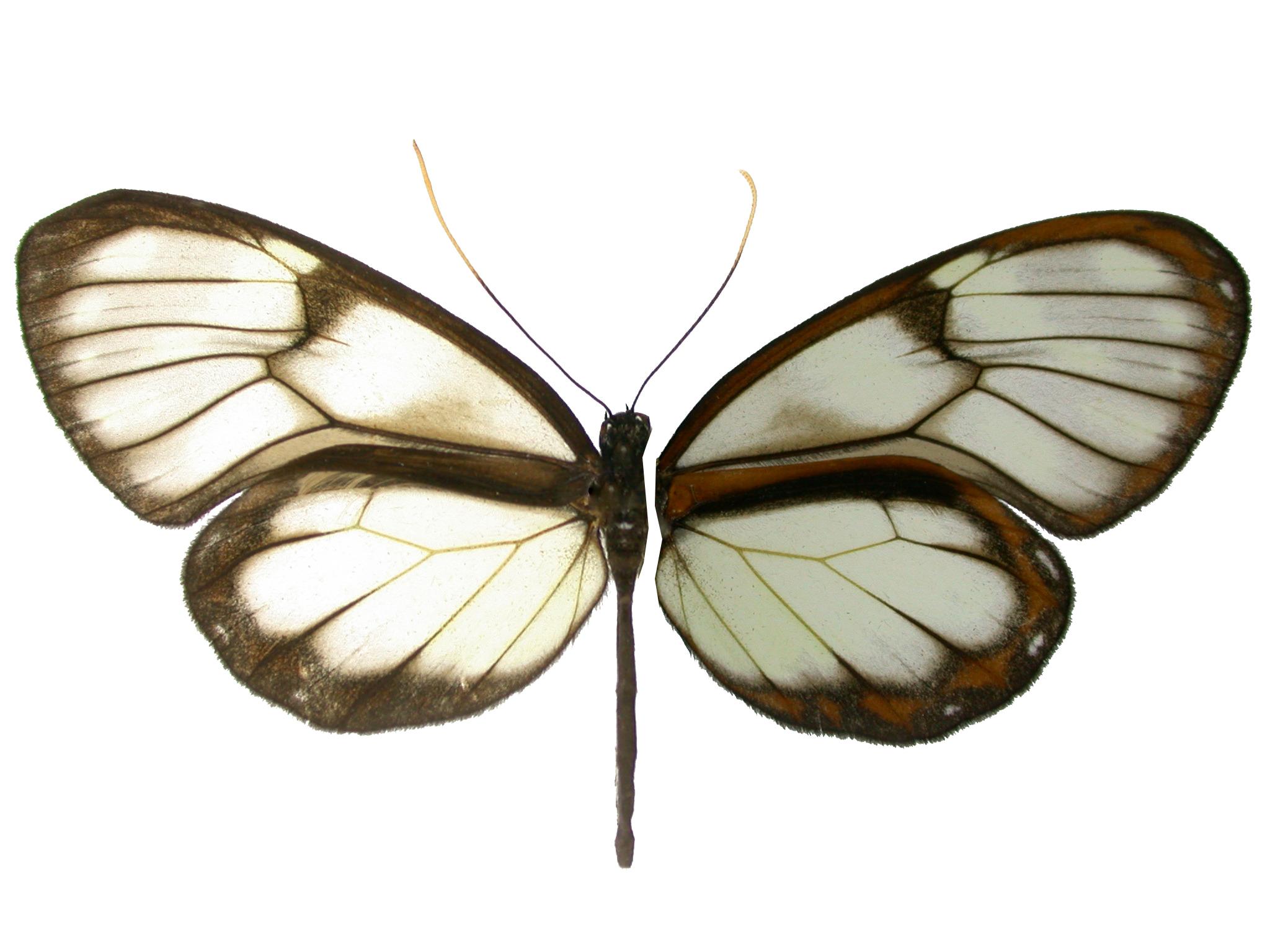

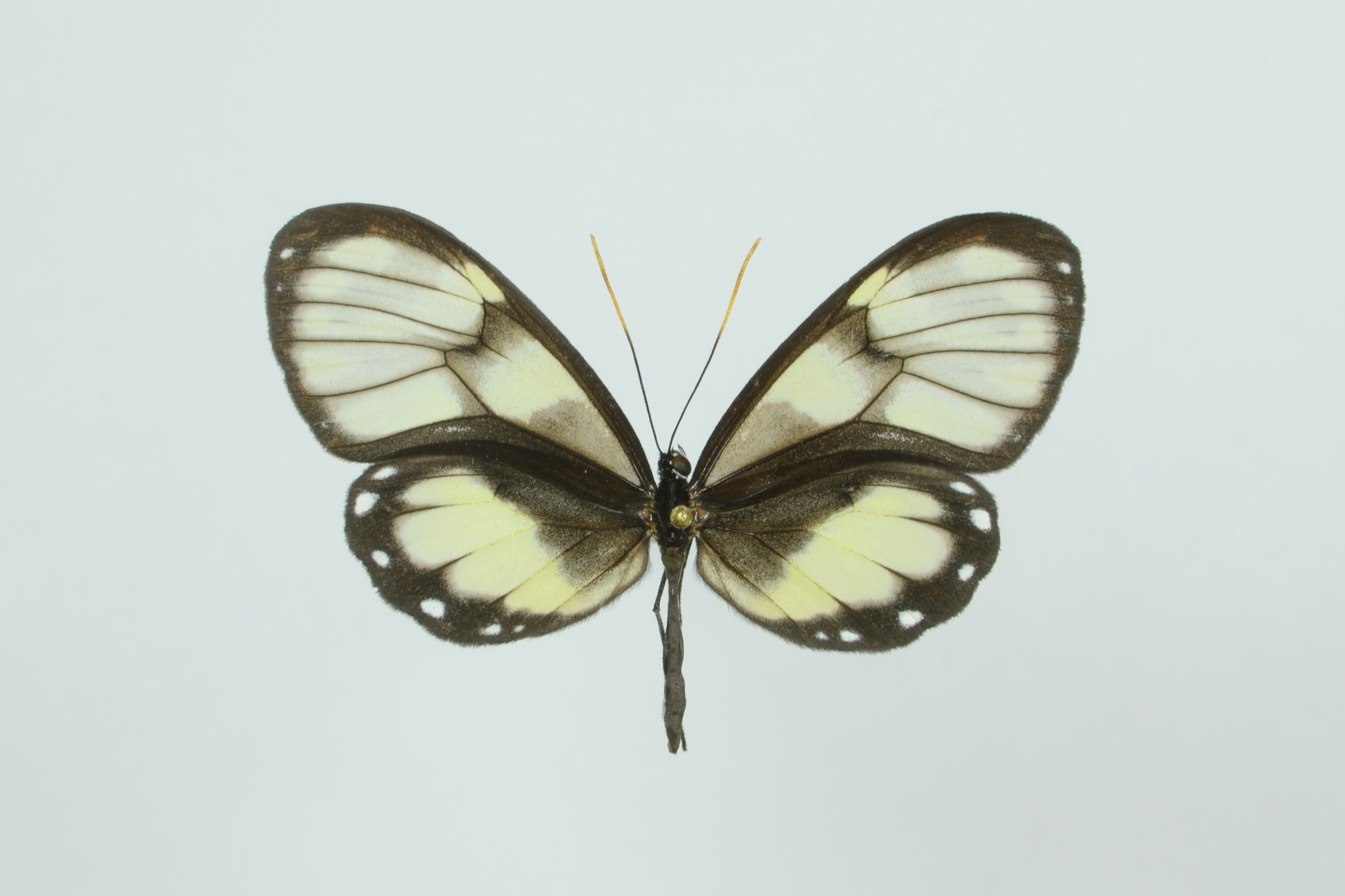

Scientific classification
- Domain: Eukaryota
- Kingdom: Animalia
- Phylum: Arthropoda
- Class: Insecta
- Order: Lepidoptera
- Family: Nymphalidae
- Genus: Godyris
- Species: G. zavaleta

Binomial name
- Godyris zavaleta (Hewitson, 1855)

Synonyms
- Ithomia zavaleta Hewitson, 1855; Ithomia gonussa Hewitson, 1856; Ithomia telesilla Hewitson, 1863; Ithomia sosunga Reakirt, [1866]; Ithomia petersii Dewitz, 1877; Ithomia zygia Godman & Salvin, 1877; Hymenitis matronalis Weymer, 1883; Dismenitis zavaletta amaretta Haensch, 1903; Dismenitis zygia var. caesiopicta Niepelt, 1915; Godyris zavaleta sorites Fox, 1968

= Godyris zavaleta =

Species of butterfly

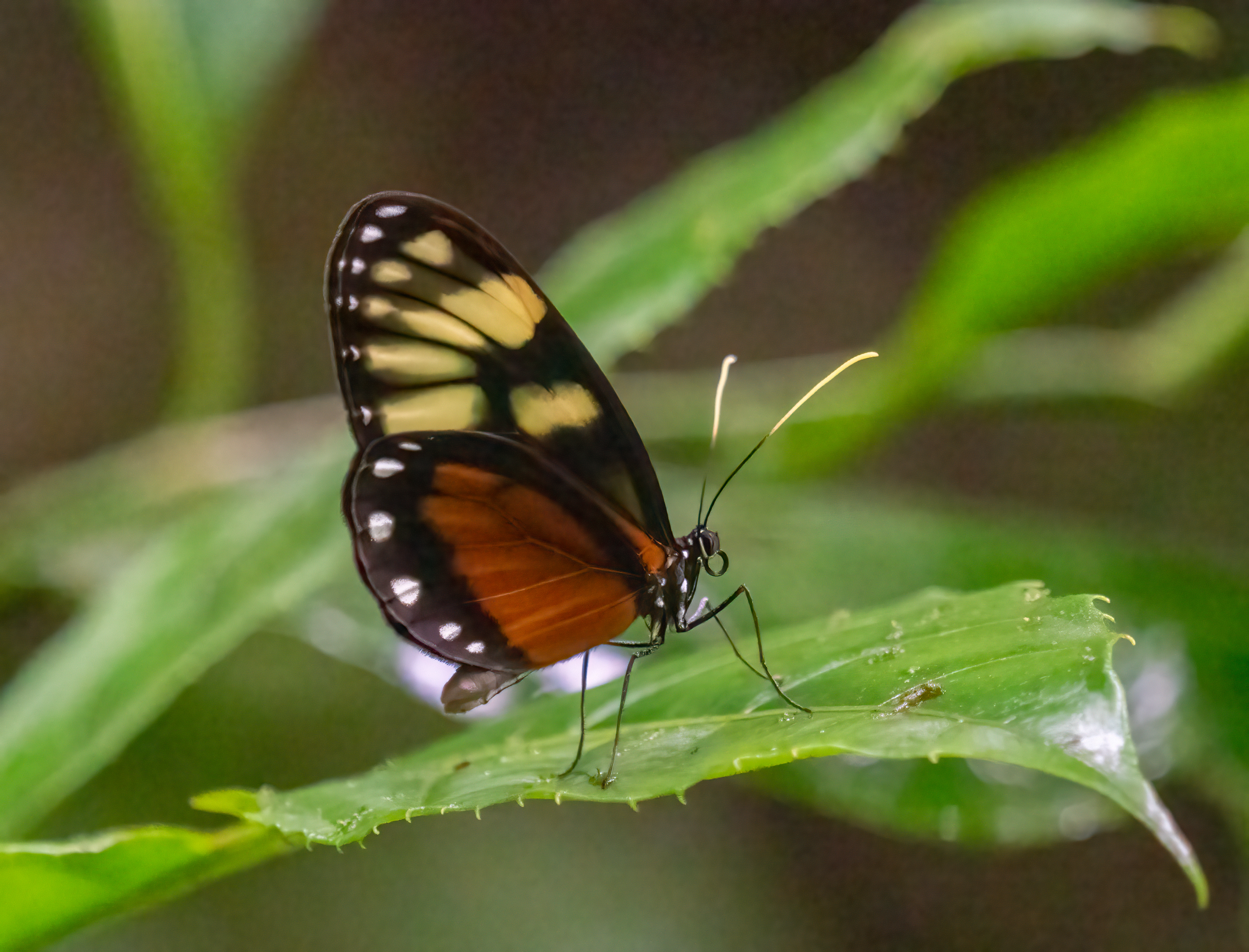
Godyris zavaleta in Costa Rica

Godyris zavaleta, the Zavaleta glasswing, is a species of butterfly of the family Nymphalidae. It is found from Costa Rica to southern Peru. The habitat consists of lowland and mid-elevation rainforests at altitudes up to 900 meters.

Adults visit the flowers of Epidendrum panniculatum. Adult males sequester pyrrolizidine alkaloids from Heliotropium, Tournefourtia, Myosotis, Eupatorium, Neomiranda and Senecio species, making the species toxic to deter predation by birds.

The larvae feed on Solanum species (including S. brenesii), but have also been recorded feeding on Cestrum nocturnum.

== Subspecies ==
- G. z. zavaleta (Colombia)
- G. z. baudoensis Vitale & Rodriguez, 2004 (Colombia)
- G. z. caesiopicta (Niepelt, 1915) (Costa Rica, Panama)
- G. z. eutelina Brévignon, 1993 (Guyanas)
- G. z. gonussa (Hewitson, 1856) (Colombia)
- G. z. huallaga Fox, 1941 (Peru)
- G. z. matronalis (Weymer, 1883) (Ecuador)
- G. z. petersii (Dewitz, 1877) (Colombia)
- G. z. rosata Vitale & Rodriguez, 2004 (Ecuador)
- G. z. sosunga (Reakirt, [1866]) (Honduras)
- G. z. telesilla (Hewitson, 1863) (Ecuador)
- G. z. zygia (Godman & Salvin, 1877) (Costa Rica to Panama)
