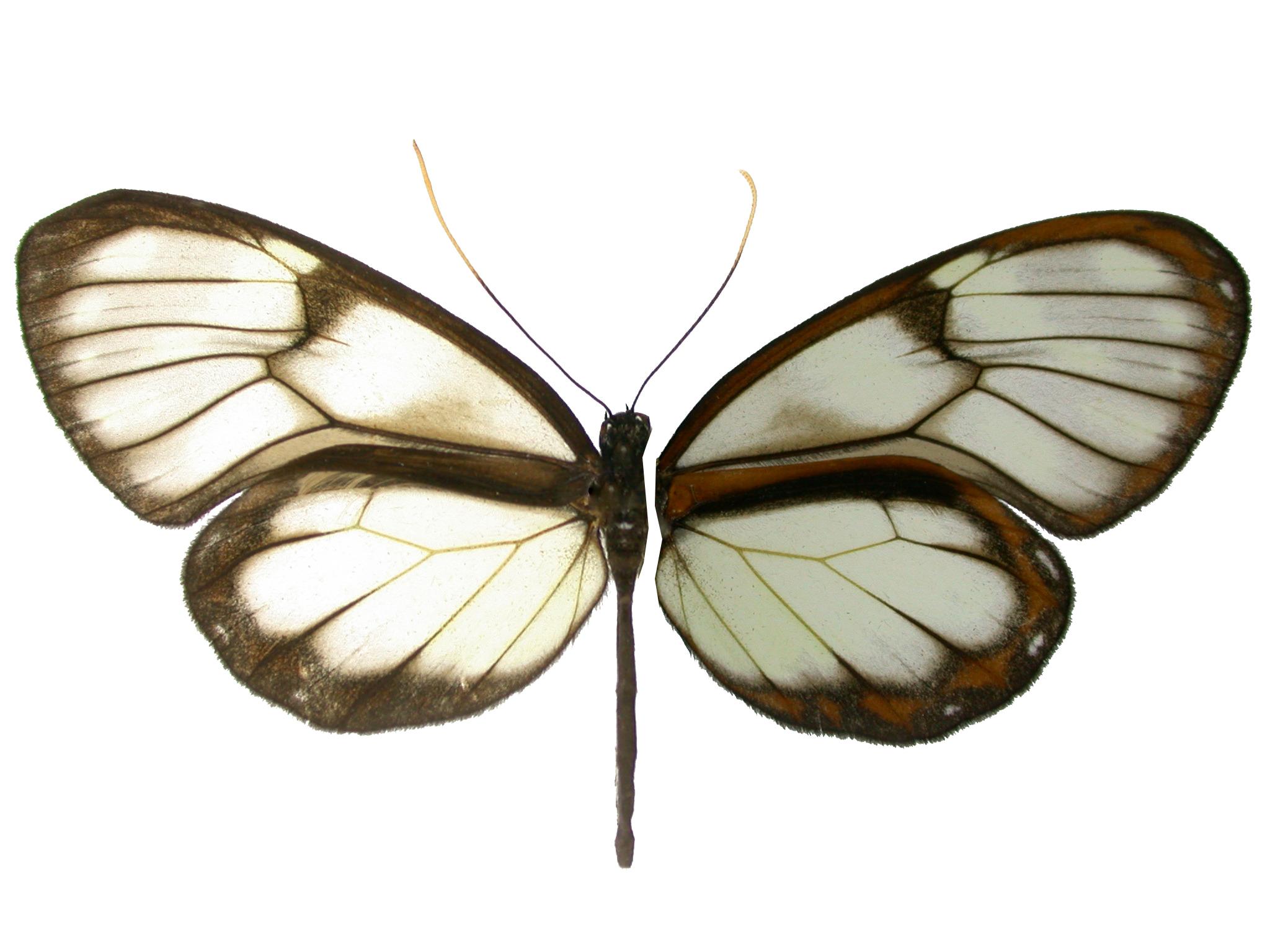
- Godyris zavaleta

Scientific classification
- Domain: Eukaryota
- Kingdom: Animalia
- Phylum: Arthropoda
- Class: Insecta
- Order: Lepidoptera
- Family: Nymphalidae
- Tribe: Ithomiini
- Genus: Godyris; Boisduval, 1870

Species
- See text

Synonyms
- Dismenitis Haensch, 1903; Dygoris Fox, 1945

= Godyris =

Genus of brush-footed butterflies

Godyris is a genus of clearwing (ithomiine) butterflies, named by Jean Baptiste Boisduval in 1870. They are in the brush-footed butterfly family, Nymphalidae.

== Species ==
Arranged alphabetically:

- Godyris cleomella (Hewitson, 1874)
- Godyris crinippa (Hewitson, 1874)
- Godyris dircenna (C. & R. Felder, [1865])
- Godyris duillia (Hewitson, 1854)
- Godyris kedema (Hewitson, 1855)
- Godyris lauta (Haensch, 1910)
- Godyris mantura (Hewitson, 1876)
- Godyris nepos (Weymer, 1875)
- Godyris nero (Hewitson, 1855)
- Godyris nubilosa Brabant, 2004
- Godyris panthyale (C. & R. Felder, 1862)
- Godyris sappho (Haensch, 1910)
- Godyris zavaleta (Hewitson, 1855)
