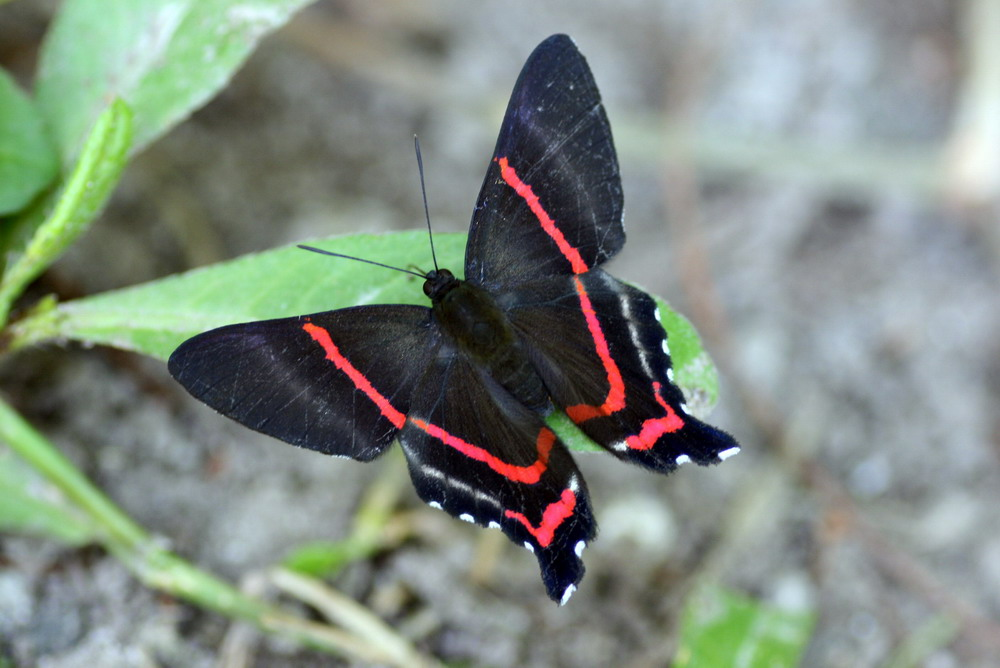
- Ancyluris aulestes

Scientific classification
- Domain: Eukaryota
- Kingdom: Animalia
- Phylum: Arthropoda
- Class: Insecta
- Order: Lepidoptera
- Family: Riodinidae
- Subfamily: Riodininae
- Tribe: Riodinini
- Genus: Ancyluris; Hübner, 1819

Species
- See text

Synonyms
- Melibaea Saunders, 1859 (preocc. Forbes, 1838)

= Ancyluris =

Genus of butterflies

Ancyluris is a butterfly genus in the family Riodinidae. They are resident in the Neotropics.

== Species list ==
- Ancyluris aristodorus (Morisse, 1838) French Guiana, Ecuador
- Ancyluris aulestes (Cramer, 1777) French Guiana, Guyana, Suriname, Bolivia, Colombia, Ecuador, Brazil, Peru
  - A. a. aulestes Suriname, Brazil, Peru
  - A. a. eryxo (Saunders, 1859) Bolivia Peru
  - A. a. jocularis Stichel, 1909 Colombia, Ecuador
  - A. a. pandama (Saunders, 1850) Brazil
- Ancyluris colubra (Saunders, 1859) Venezuela, Brazil, Peru
- Ancyluris etias (Saunders, 1859) Bolivia, Suriname, Peru
  - A. e. etias Peru
  - A. e. gracilis Stichel, 1910 Suriname
  - A. e. mendita (Druce, 1904) Bolivia
- Ancyluris formosissima (Hewitson, 1870) Ecuador, Peru
  - A. f. formosissima Ecuador
  - A. f. venerabilis Stichel, 1916 Peru
- Ancyluris inca (Saunders, 1850) Mexico, Panama, Colombia, Ecuador, Bolivia, Peru
  - A. i. inca Mexico Panama
  - A. i. cacica (C. & R. Felder, 1865) Colombia, Peru
  - A. i. formosa (Hewitson, 1870) Ecuador
  - A. i. huascar (Saunders, 1859) Colombia, Ecuador
  - A. i. miranda (Hewitson, 1874) Bolivia, Peru
  - A. i. pulchra (Hewitson, 1870) Ecuador
- Ancyluris jurgensenii (Saunders, 1850) Mexico, Panama, Colombia
  - A. j. jurgensenii Mexico, Panama
  - A. j. atahualpa (Saunders, 1859) Colombia
- Ancyluris meliboeus (Fabricius, 1777)
  - A. m. meliboeus French Guiana, Suriname, Brazil, Peru
  - A. m. euaemon Stichel, 1910 Colombia, Bolivia, Peru
  - A. m. julia (Saunders, 1850) Brazil
- Ancyluris melior Stichel, 1910 Brazil, Peru
- Ancyluris miniola (Bates, 1868) Brazil
- Ancyluris mira (Hewitson, 1874) Colombia, Ecuador, Bolivia, Peru
  - A. m. mira Bolivia, Peru
  - A. m. furia Stichel, 1925 Colombia, Ecuador
  - A. m. thaumasia Stichel, 1910 Bolivia
- Ancyluris paramba D'Abrera, 1994 Ecuador
- Ancyluris paetula Stichel, 1916 Peru
- Ancyluris rubrofilum Stichel, 1909 Bolivia
- Ancyluris tedea (Cramer, 1777) French Guiana, Guyana, Suriname, Bolivia, Peru
  - A. t. tedea Suriname
  - A. t. silvicultrix Stichel, 1909 Bolivia, Peru
