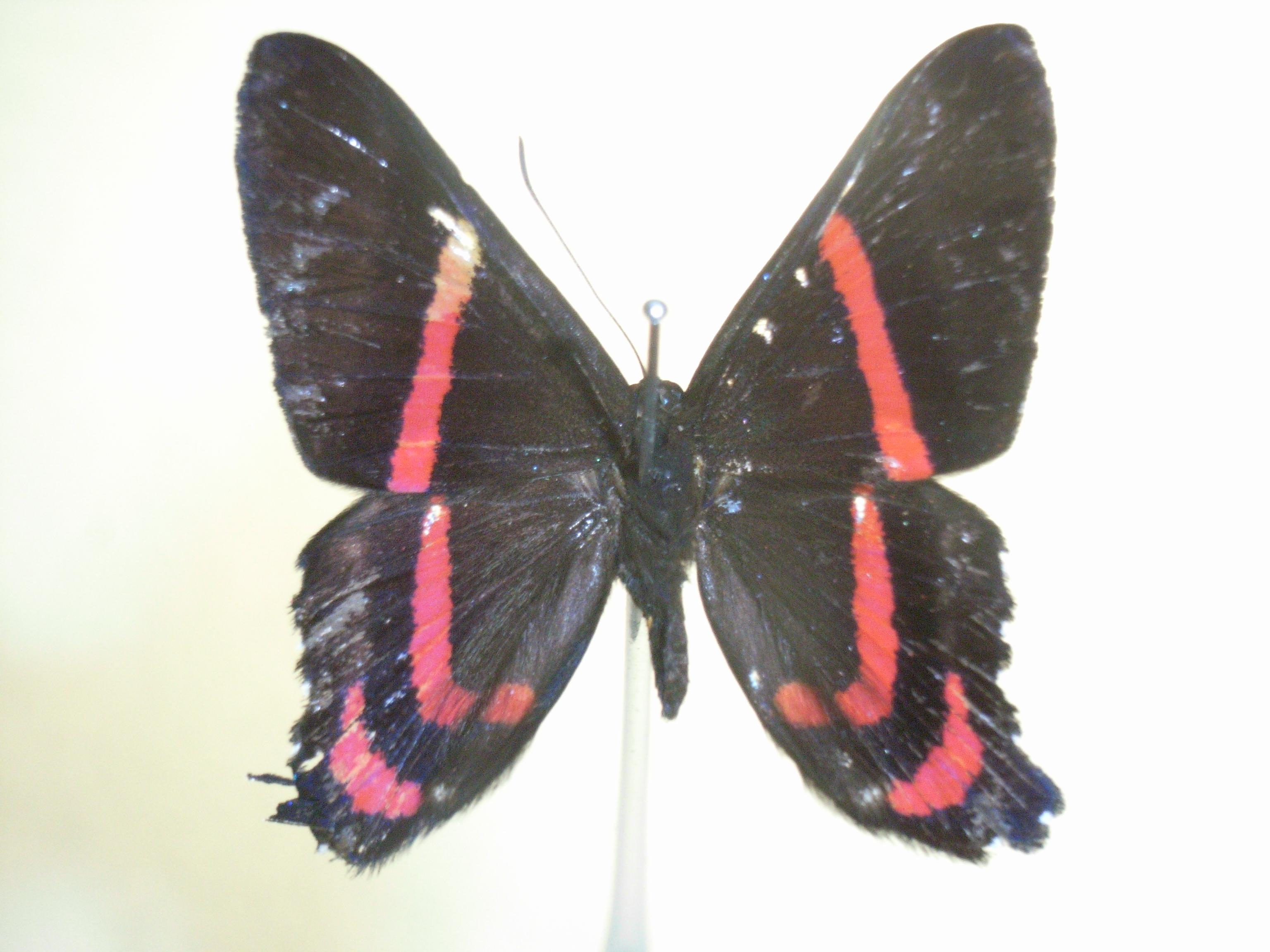

Scientific classification
- Kingdom: Animalia
- Phylum: Arthropoda
- Class: Insecta
- Order: Lepidoptera
- Family: Riodinidae
- Genus: Ancyluris
- Species: A. meliboeus

Binomial name
- Ancyluris meliboeus (Fabricius, 1777)

Synonyms
- Papilio meliboeus Fabricius, 1777; Papilio pyretus Cramer, [1777]; Ancyluris pyrete Hübner, [1819]; Ancyluris meliboeus phonia Stichel, 1909; Ancyluris eudaemon Stichel, 1910

= Ancyluris meliboeus =

Meliboeus swordtail

Species of butterfly

Ancyluris meliboeus (meliboeus swordtail) is a butterfly of the family Riodinidae. It is found in Suriname, Brazil, Colombia, Bolivia and Peru.

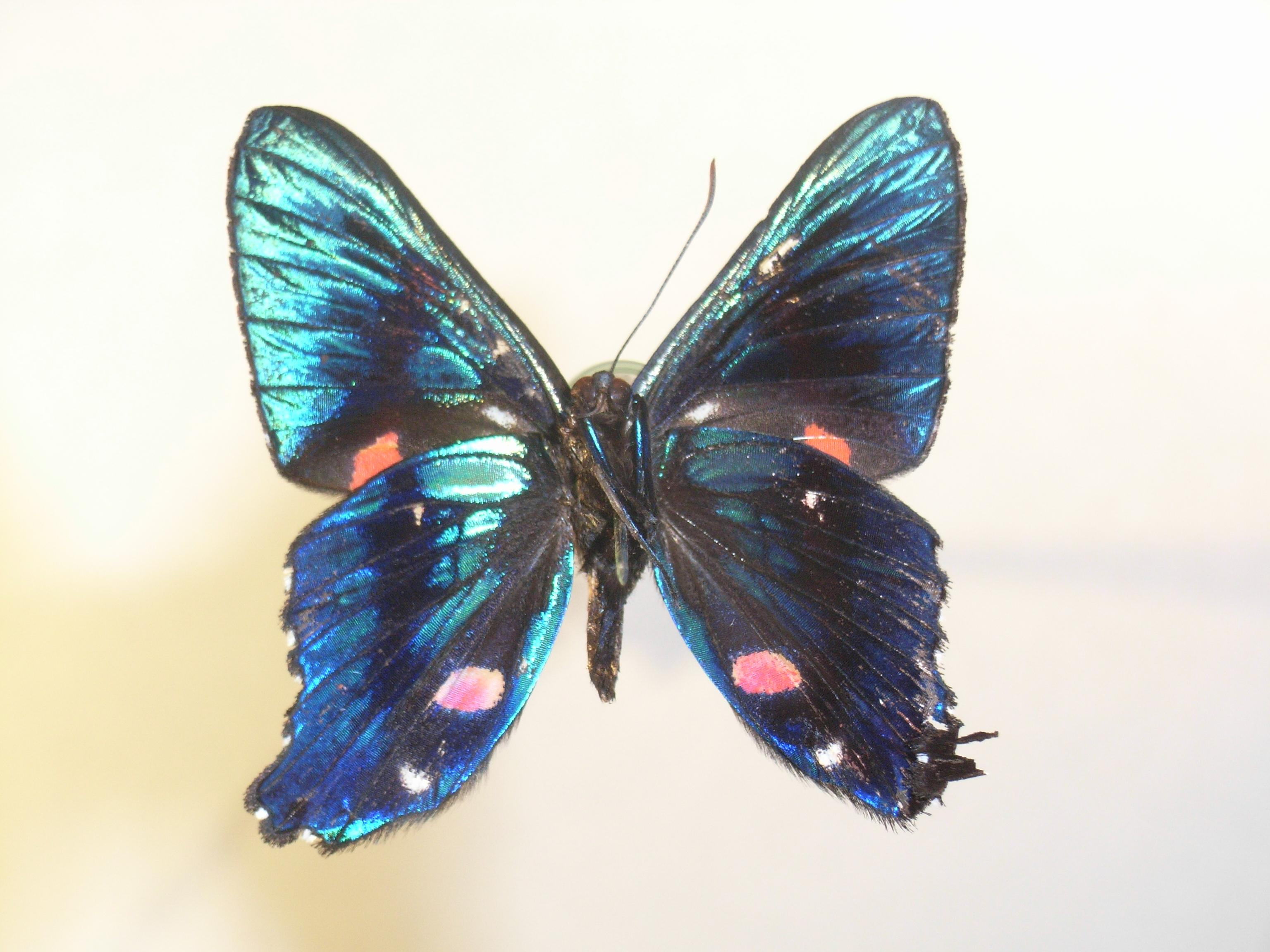
Underside

The wingspan is about 40 mm.

== Subspecies ==
- Ancyluris meliboeus meliboeus (Surinam, Brazil (Amazonas), Peru)
- Ancyluris meliboeus euaemon (Peru, Colombia, Bolivia)
- Ancyluris meliboeus julia (Brazil)
