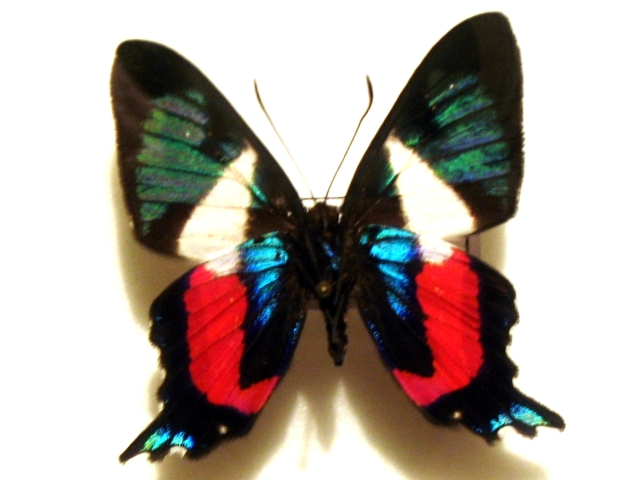
- Ancyluris formosissima, male
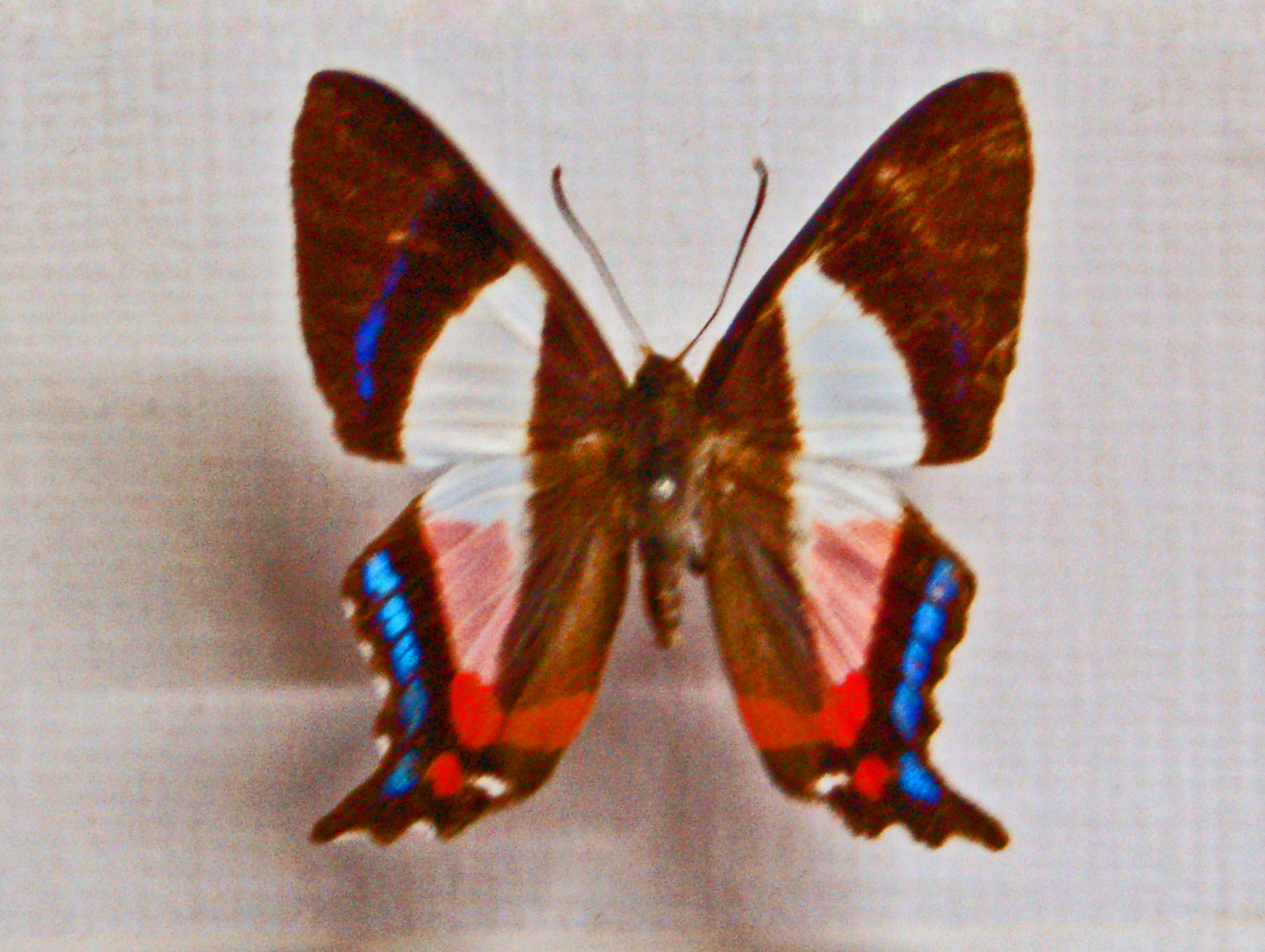
- Ancyluris formosissima venerabilis from Peru at National Museum (Prague)

Scientific classification
- Domain: Eukaryota
- Kingdom: Animalia
- Phylum: Arthropoda
- Class: Insecta
- Order: Lepidoptera
- Family: Riodinidae
- Genus: Ancyluris
- Species: A. formosissima

Binomial name
- Ancyluris formosissima (Hewitson, 1870)

Synonyms
- Erycina formosissima Hewitson, 1870

= Ancyluris formosissima =

Species of butterfly

Ancyluris formosissima is a butterfly of the family Riodinidae.

== Description ==
The wingspan of Ancyluris formosissima is about 38–45 millimetres (1.5–1.8 in). The upper sides of the forewings are dark brown with a blue-green band, while the base is white and brown. The hind wings are white, pink and brown, with a brilliant blue-green marginal band and a small red area. At the edge of the hind wings there is a short tail. In South America, this butterfly is called a "living treasure" (the Latin name formosissima of this species, means “very beautiful”) and it is also called the Italian flag butterfly. It flies in August and September.

== Distribution ==
This species is present in tropical rainforests forests of South America, mainly in Ecuador, Peru and Bolivia. The subspecies Ancyluris formosissima venerabilis can be found at an elevation up to 3,000 metres (9,800 ft) above sea level.

== Subspecies ==
- Ancyluris formosissima formosissima (Hewitson, 1870) (Ecuador)
- Ancyluris formosissima venerabilis Stichel, 1916 (Peru)
