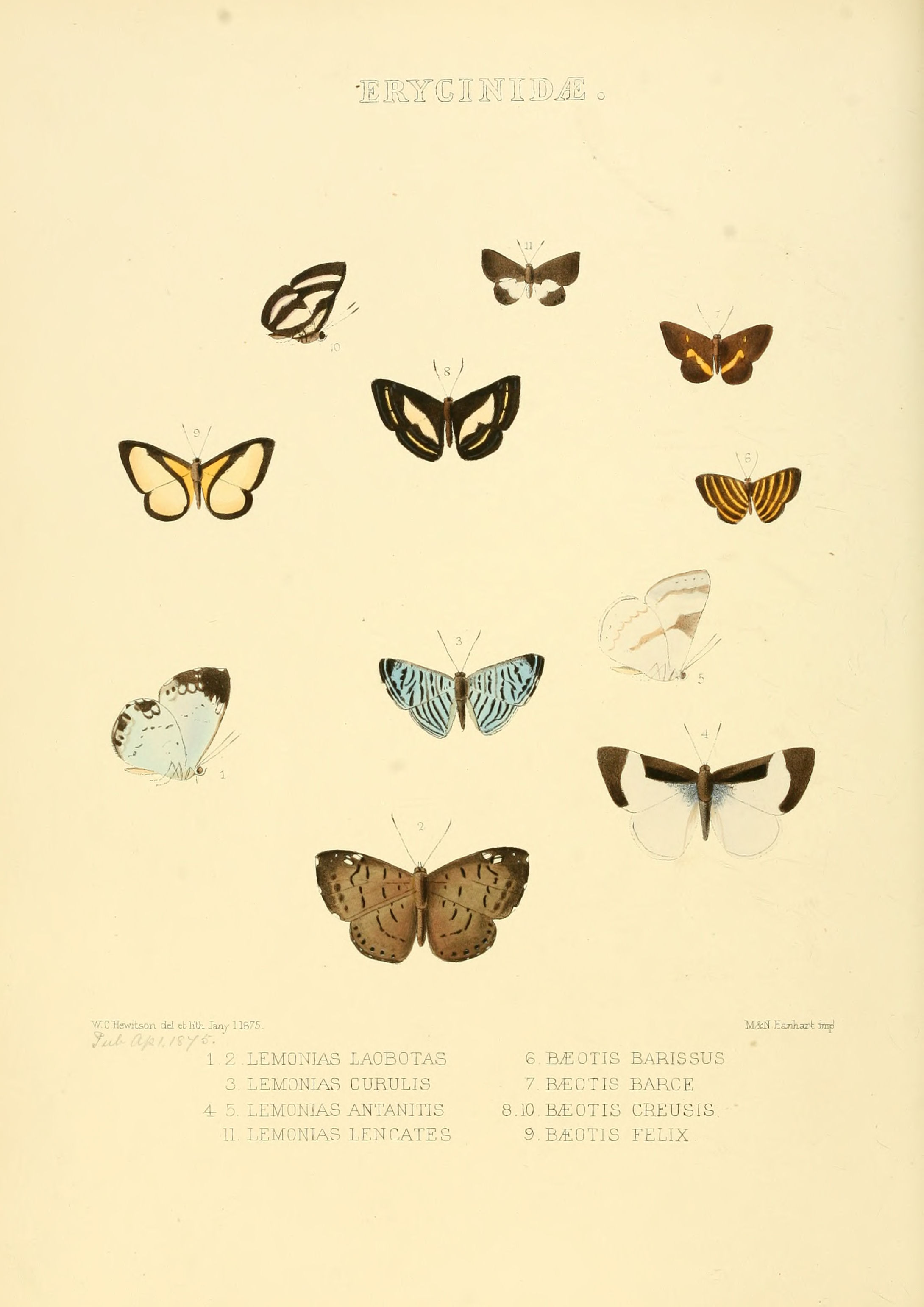
- Bæotis barce. Fig. 7., Bæotis creusis Figs. 8, 10, Bæotis felix Fig. 9.

Scientific classification
- Kingdom: Animalia
- Phylum: Arthropoda
- Class: Insecta
- Order: Lepidoptera
- Family: Riodinidae
- Subfamily: Riodininae
- Tribe: Riodinini
- Genus: Baeotis; Hübner, 1819

Species
- See text

= Baeotis =

Genus of butterflies

Baeotis is a butterfly genus in the family Riodinidae. They are resident in the Americas. Baeotis are tiny (25–40 mm.), black and yellow, sometimes also white and black butterflies flying about in the sunshine during day-time, with a delicate body, a somewhat projecting apex of the forewing and an extraordinarily short cell of the hindwing, which is not even half as large as the cell of the forewing.

== Species list ==
- Baeotis attali Hall & Willmott, 1998 Ecuador.
- Baeotis bacaenis Hewitson, 1874 Ecuador, Bolivia, Peru.yellow basal stripe, very thin submarginal, the median area of both wings forms a white, conjoint oval
- Baeotis bacaenita Schaus, 1902 Peru.yellow median area narrowed, particularly in its costal part of the forewing, but otherwise it is allied to nesaea.
- Baeotis barce Hewitson, 1875 Guyane, Mexico, Honduras.yellow median band is present only on the hindwings, whereas on the forewings it is obsolete except a tiny median spot and a faint beginning at the inner margin.
- Baeotis capreolus Stichel, 1910 Guyane, Colombia.fusiform distal spots are coherent with the yellow median band by means of a broad pedicle.
- Baeotis cephissa (Hewitson, 1875) Brazil.
- Baeotis choroniensis Lichy, 1946 Venezuela.
- Baeotis creusis Hewitson, 1874 Bolivia, Peru.median stripe white, above and below tapering and slightly bent like an S.
- Baeotis elegantula Hopffer, 1874
- Baeotis euprepes (Bates, 1868) Guyane, Bolivia, Brazil.
- Baeotis felix Hewitson, 1874 Ecuador, Bolivia.White with a broad black border, the lemon-coloured base of both wings separated from the white ground-colour by a black stripe (from the middle of the costa of the forewing to the middle of the inner margin on the hindwing.
- Baeotis hisbon (Cramer, [1775]) Guyane Brazil.
- Baeotis johannae Sharpe, 1890 Brazil. wing contour differs; pale-yellow median band running broadly through the dull blackish wing.
- Baeotis kadenii (C. & R. Felder, 1861) Venezuela, Colombia. white markings and a diagnostic orange-red postdiscal on the forewing.
- Baeotis macularia (Boisduval, 1870) Mexico to Colombia.
- Baeotis melanis Hübner, [1831] Brazil.
- Baeotis nesaea Godman & Salvin, 1889 Panama, Costa Rica, Ecuador, Peru.broad black margin traversed by a yellow thin stripe running between 2 metallic lines.
- Baeotis prima (Bates, 1868) Guyane, Brazil 3 yellow transverse stripes; the first runs along the inner margin of the hindwing, the middle stripe is oblique, the subapical one fine. On the under surface one yellow stripe in addition and the outer one in the anal part of the hindwing forked.
- Baeotis staudingeri D'Abrera, 1994 Peru.
- Baeotis sulphurea (R. Felder, 1869) Mexico, Venezuela, Guatemala, Costa Rica, Ecuador, Colombia.
- Baeotis zonata R. Felder, 1869 Mexico, Honduras, Guatemala, Ecuador, Colombia.yellow stripes widened, particularly in the female, and behind the (shortened) outermost stripe of the forewing, which is mostly fusiform, a small yellow spot in the anal angle of the forewing.
