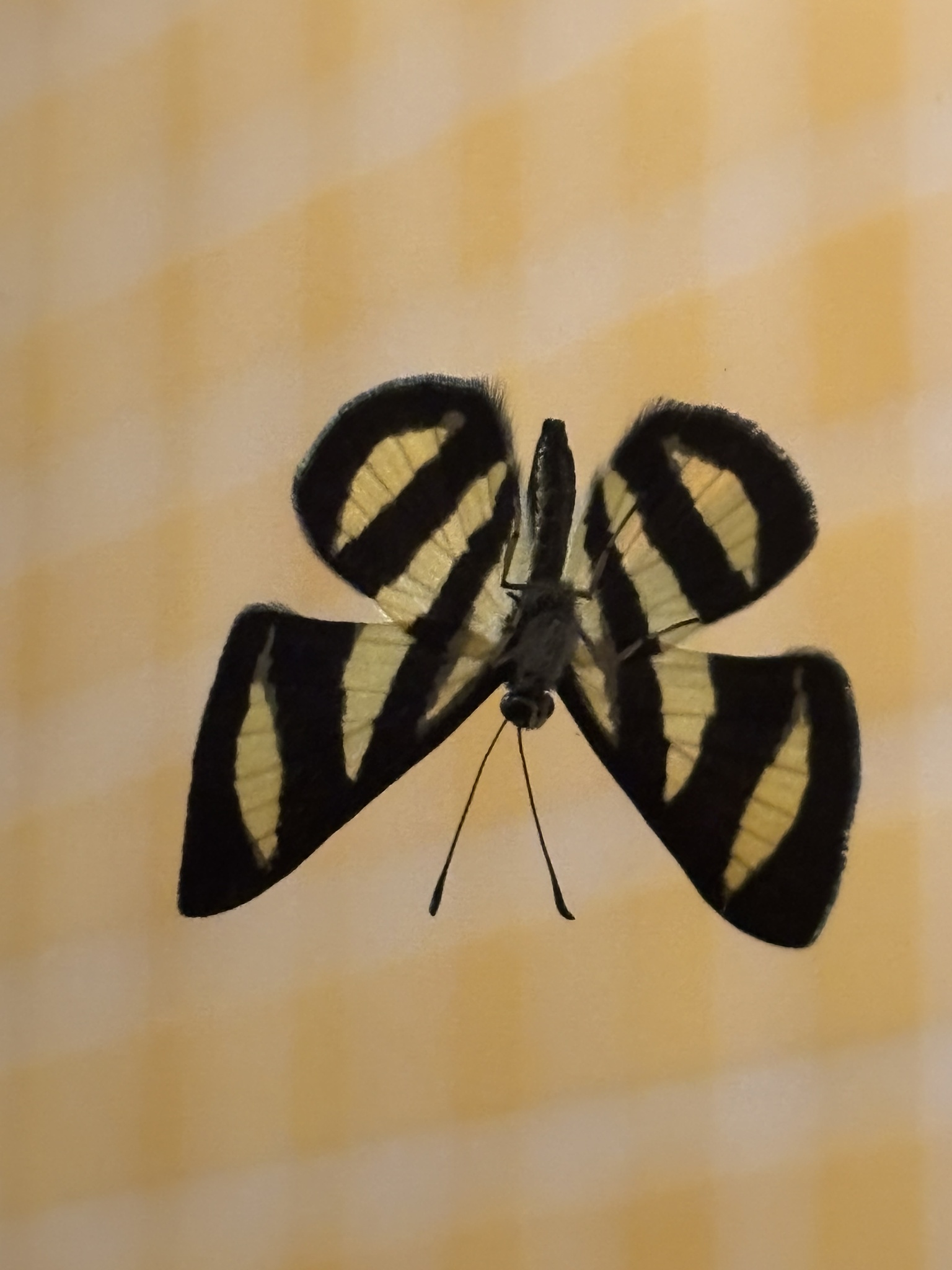

Scientific classification
- Kingdom: Animalia
- Phylum: Arthropoda
- Class: Insecta
- Order: Lepidoptera
- Family: Riodinidae
- Genus: Baeotis
- Species: B. hisbon

Binomial name
- Baeotis hisbon Cramer, 1775

Synonyms
- Papillio hisbon

= Baeotis hisbon =

Species of butterfly

Baeotis hisbon is a species of butterfly in the family Riodinidae. It was described by Pieter Cramer in 1775. It is found in French Guiana and Brazil.

== Description ==
The underside is practically similar to the upperside except for the absence of a green silvery stripe and spots on the underside.

== Subspecies ==
Two subspecies are recognized-

- Baeotis hisbon hisbon (Cramer, 1775)
- Baeotis hisbon disjuncta (Brévignon, 1998)
