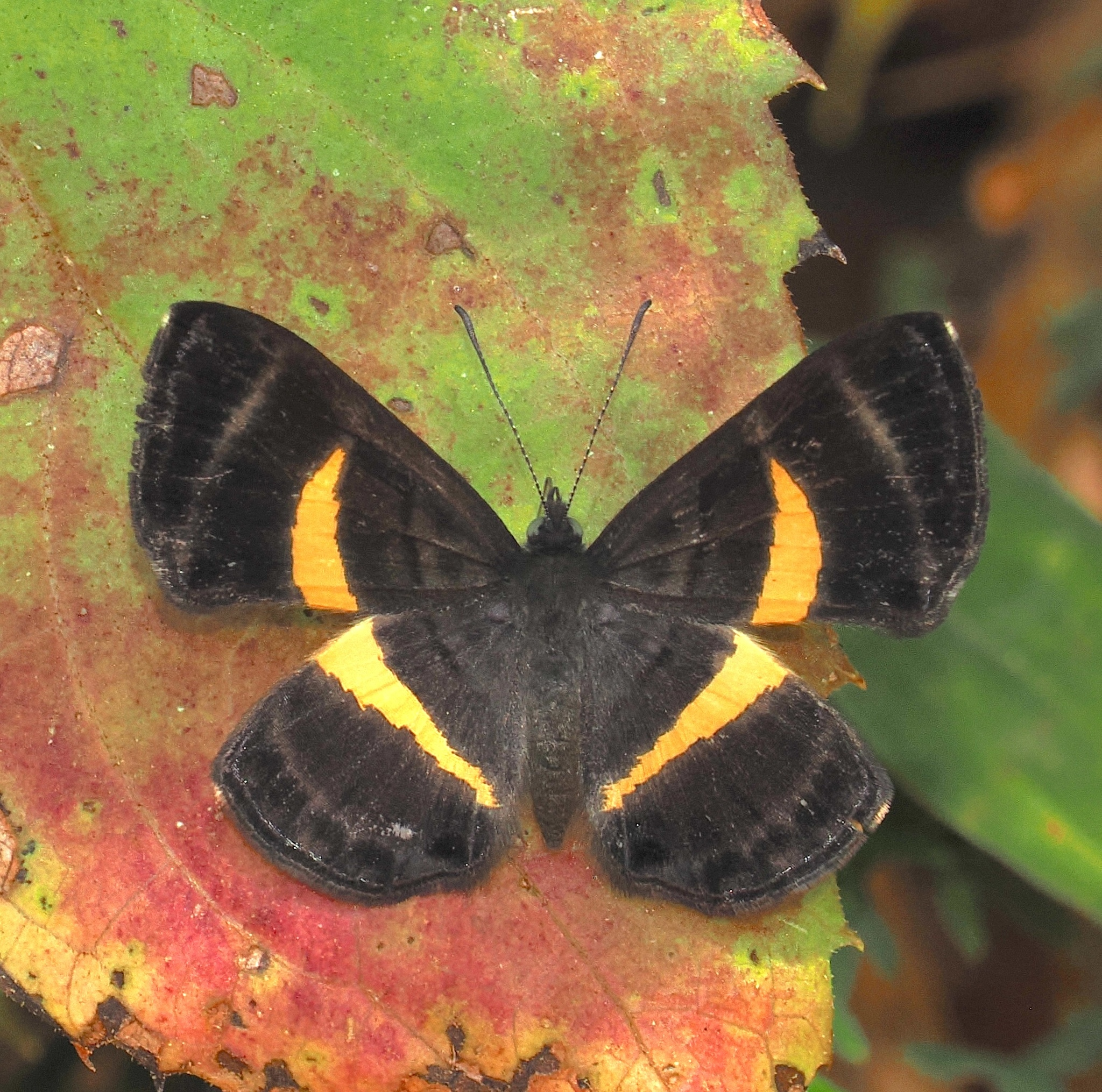

Scientific classification
- Kingdom: Animalia
- Phylum: Arthropoda
- Clade: Pancrustacea
- Class: Insecta
- Order: Lepidoptera
- Family: Riodinidae
- Genus: Baeotis
- Species: B. melanis

Binomial name
- Baeotis melanis Hübner, 1831

= Baeotis melanis =

Species of butterfly

Baeotis melanis is a species of butterfly in the family Riodinidae. It was described by Jacob Hübner in 1831. It is found in Brazil.

== Description ==
The upperside is dark black with two to four yellow stripes. The underside is similar but has larger peach-coloured stripes.
