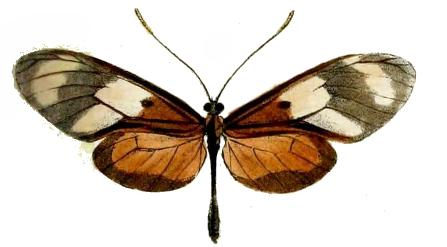
- Callithomia lenea

Scientific classification
- Domain: Eukaryota
- Kingdom: Animalia
- Phylum: Arthropoda
- Class: Insecta
- Order: Lepidoptera
- Family: Nymphalidae
- Tribe: Ithomiini
- Genus: Callithomia; Bates, 1862

Type species
- Callithomia alexirrhoe Bates, 1862

Species
- See text

Synonyms
- Cleodis Boisduval, 1870; Epithomia Godman & Salvin, [1879]; Corbulis Boisduval, 1870; Leithomia Masters, 1973

= Callithomia =

Genus of brush-footed butterflies

Callithomia is a genus of clearwing (ithomiine) butterflies, named by Henry Walter Bates in 1862. They are in the brush-footed butterfly family, Nymphalidae.

== Species ==
Arranged alphabetically:

- Callithomia alexirrhoe Bates, 1862
- Callithomia hezia (Hewitson, [1854])
- Callithomia lenea (Cramer, [1779])
