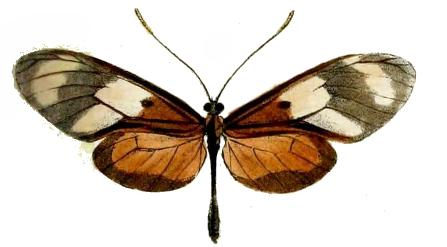
- Callithomia lenea agrippina

Scientific classification
- Kingdom: Animalia
- Phylum: Arthropoda
- Class: Insecta
- Order: Lepidoptera
- Family: Nymphalidae
- Genus: Callithomia
- Species: C. lenea

Binomial name
- Callithomia lenea (Cramer, [1779])

Synonyms
- Papilio lenea Cramer, [1779]; Dircenna lenea; Papilio melanida Cramer, 1779; Dircenna zoelo Bates, 1862; Dircenna elvira Weymer, 1899; Ithomia drogheda Weeks, 1906; Leithomia skinneri Masters, 1973; Callithomia juruaensis d'Almeida, 1958; Callithomia foxi Masters, 1970; Ithomia hulda Herrich-Schäffer, 1865; Dircenna epidero ab. signata Haensch, 1909; Ithomia agrippina Hewitson, [1863]; Dircenna callipero Bates, 1863; Ithomia balboa Bates, 1863; Corbulis euphane Boisduval, 1870; Corbulis neobule Boisduval, 1870; Epithomia callipero; Epithomia agrippina; Corbulis agrippina; Corbulis callipero; Epithomia alpho f. nikita Haensch, 1909; Epithomia alpho; Callithomia viridipuncta Kaye, 1918; Callithomia viridipuncta ab. confluens Kaye, 1918; Callithomia zingiber Fox, 1945; Callithomia lauta Fox, 1945; Dircenna obfuscata Butler, 1873; Ithomia methonella Herrich-Schäffer, 1865; Dircenna amphidero Poulton, 1898; Dircenna rufa Forbes, 1942

= Callithomia lenea =

Species of butterfly

Callithomia lenea is a species of butterfly of the family Nymphalidae. It is found in Central and South America.

== Subspecies ==
- Callithomia lenea lenea (Surinam, French Guiana, Venezuela)
- Callithomia lenea zelie (Guérin-Méneville, [1844]) (Bolivia, Peru, Brazil: Acre)
- Callithomia lenea xantho (C. & R. Felder, 1860) (Brazil: Bahia)
- Callithomia lenea epidero (Bates, 1862) (Brazil: Pará)
- Callithomia lenea agrippina (Hewitson, 1863) (Colombia, Panama)
- Callithomia lenea alpho (C. & R. Felder, 1865) (Venezuela)
- Callithomia lenea pulcheria (Hewitson, 1870) (Ecuador)
- Callithomia lenea obfuscata Butler, 1873 (Brazil: Amazonas)
- Callithomia lenea methonella (Weymer, 1875) (Brazil: Santa Catarina), Paraguay)
- Callithomia lenea fumantis (Haensch, 1909) (Colombia)
- Callithomia lenea siparia (Kaye, 1922) (Trinidad)
- Callithomia lenea inturna (Fox, 1941) (Peru)
- Callithomia lenea travassosi d'Almeida, 1958 (Brazil: Mato Grosso)

In addition, there are three unnamed subspecies from Venezuela.
