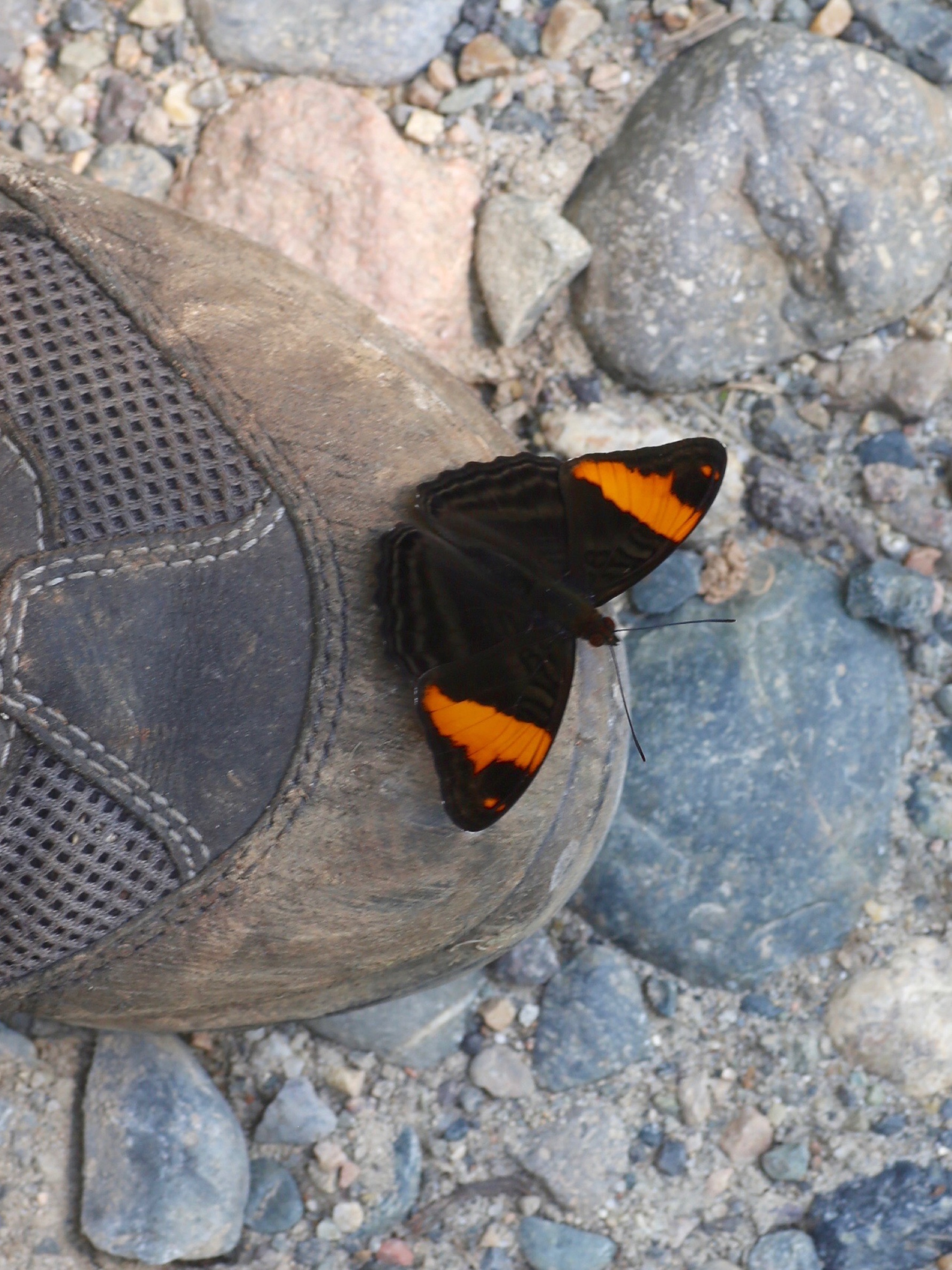

Scientific classification
- Domain: Eukaryota
- Kingdom: Animalia
- Phylum: Arthropoda
- Class: Insecta
- Order: Lepidoptera
- Family: Nymphalidae
- Genus: Adelpha
- Species: A. boreas

Binomial name
- Adelpha boreas (Butler, 1866)

Synonyms
- Heterochroa boreas Butler, [1866]; Heterochroa tizona C. & R. Felder, [1867]; Adelpha tizona tizonides Fruhstorfer, 1908; Adelpha verenda Fruhstorfer, 1913; Adelpha boreas opheltes Fruhstorfer, 1915

= Adelpha boreas =

Species of butterfly

Adelpha boreas, the gaudy sister or solitary sister, is a butterfly of the family Nymphalidae. It was described by Arthur Gardiner Butler in 1866. It is found from Costa Rica to Bolivia. The habitat consists of primary and disturbed rainforests and cloudforests at altitudes between 200 and 1,200 meters.

The wingspan is about 47 mm. Adults have been observed imbibing moisture from damp ground.

The larvae feed on Satyria species. Young larvae feed on the leaf tips, constructing a chain of frass along the midrib. Full-grown larvae have the appearance of a mossy twig.

== Subspecies ==
- Adelpha boreas boreas (Costa Rica, Panama, Venezuela, Colombia, Ecuador, Peru, Bolivia)
- Adelpha boreas kayei Hall, 1939 (Guyana)
