= Celerio =

Celerio may refer to:

- Levi Celerio, a Filipino composer and lyricist
- Celerio Reef, the Filipino name for Swallow Reef in the Spratly Islands of the South China Sea
- Suzuki Celerio, a city car

== Lepidoptera ==
- A synonym of the moth genus Hyles (moth), examples:
  - Celerio euphorbiae
  - Celerio galii
- Heterochroa celerio, the celerio sister, a butterfly
- Hippotion celerio, the vine hawk-moth or silver-striped hawk-moth
