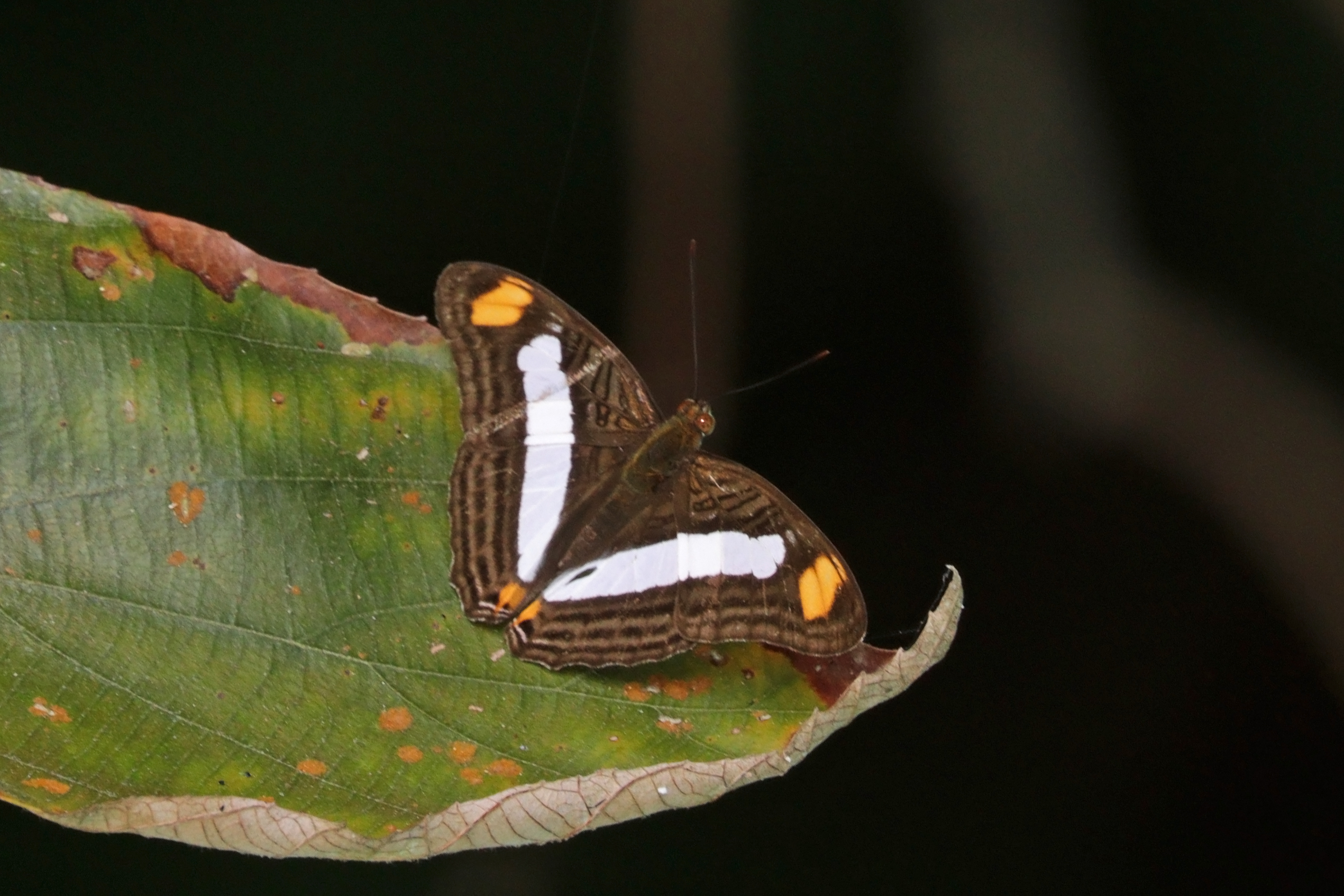
- In Panama

Scientific classification
- Kingdom: Animalia
- Phylum: Arthropoda
- Clade: Pancrustacea
- Class: Insecta
- Order: Lepidoptera
- Family: Nymphalidae
- Genus: Adelpha
- Species: A. basiloides

Binomial name
- Adelpha basiloides H. Bates, 1865

= Adelpha basiloides =

Species of butterfly

Adelpha basiloides, the spot-celled sister, is a species of butterfly in the family Nymphalidae. It is found in North and Central America.
