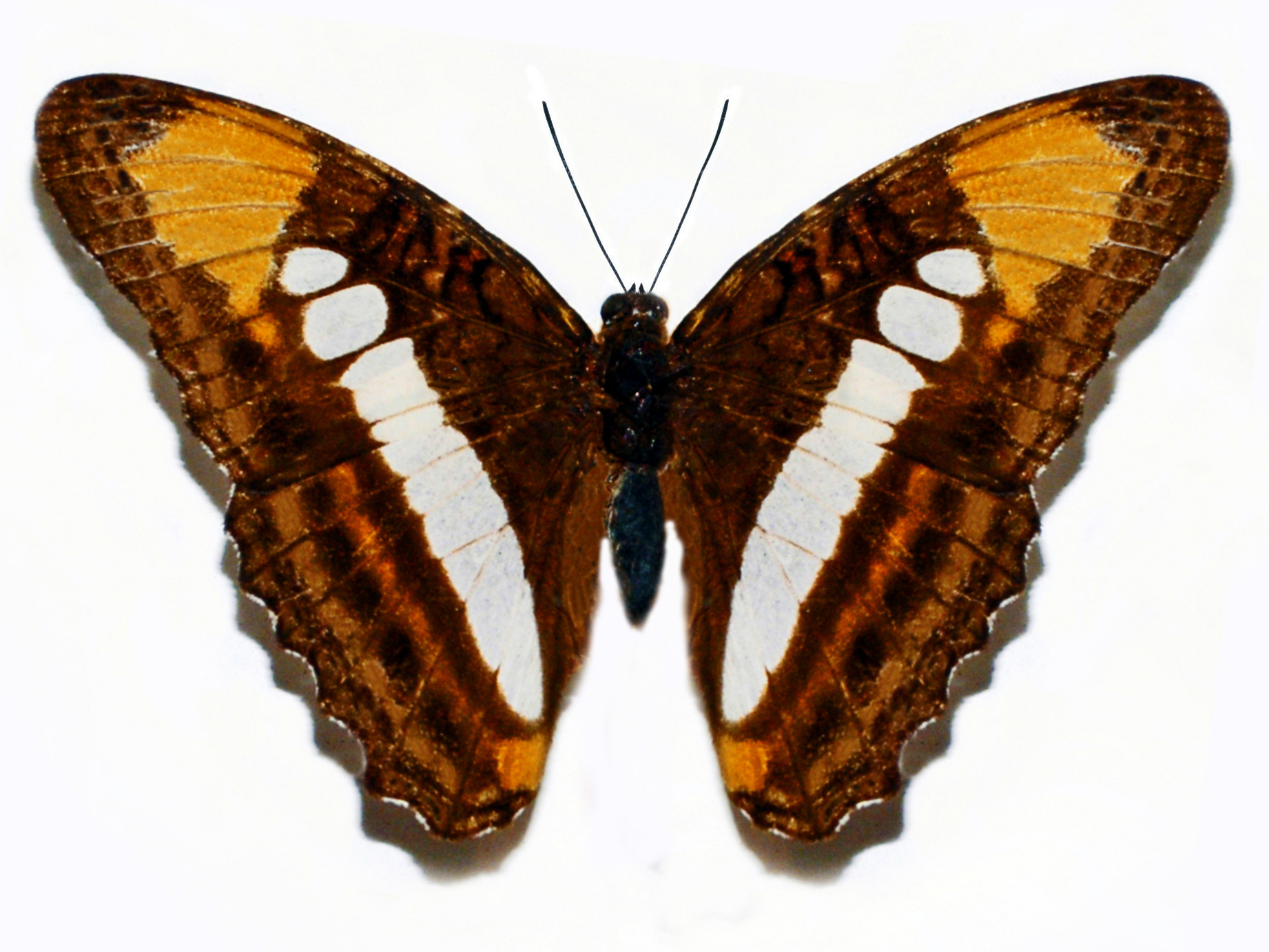

Scientific classification
- Domain: Eukaryota
- Kingdom: Animalia
- Phylum: Arthropoda
- Class: Insecta
- Order: Lepidoptera
- Family: Nymphalidae
- Genus: Adelpha
- Species: A. erotia

Binomial name
- Adelpha erotia (Hewitson, 1847)

Synonyms
- Hererochroa erotia Hewitson, 1847; Heterochroa lerna Hewitson, 1847; Heterochroa aeolia C. & R. Felder, [1867]; Adelpha permagna Fruhstorfer, 1913; Adelpha archidona Fruhstorfer, 1913; Adelpha leonina Fruhstorfer, 1913; Adelpha erotia faebina Martin, [1923]; Heterochroa caphira Hewitson, 1869; Adelpha deleta Fruhstorfer, 1913

= Adelpha erotia =

Erotia sister

Species of butterfly

Adelpha erotia, the Erotia sister, is a butterfly of the family Nymphalidae. It was described by William Chapman Hewitson in 1847.

== Description ==
Adelpha erotia has a wingspan of about 53 millimetres (2.1 in). The wings of these butterflies have a brown ground colour with a characteristic blackish marbled pattern and a broad white band on the forewings. In the subapical area of the forewing there are large orange markings. The hindwings have a similar pattern, with a broad white median band.

== Distribution and habitat ==
This species can be found from Mexico to Peru and Bolivia.

== Subspecies ==
- Adelpha erotia erotia (Nicaragua to Panama, Colombia, Ecuador, Peru, Bolivia, Guyana)
- Adelpha erotia caphira (Hewitson, 1869) (Venezuela)

== Bibliography ==
- A. Aiello Adelpha erotia erotia Form "Lerna" (Nymphalidae): Exploring a Corner of the Puzzle, Journal of the Lepidopterists' Society
