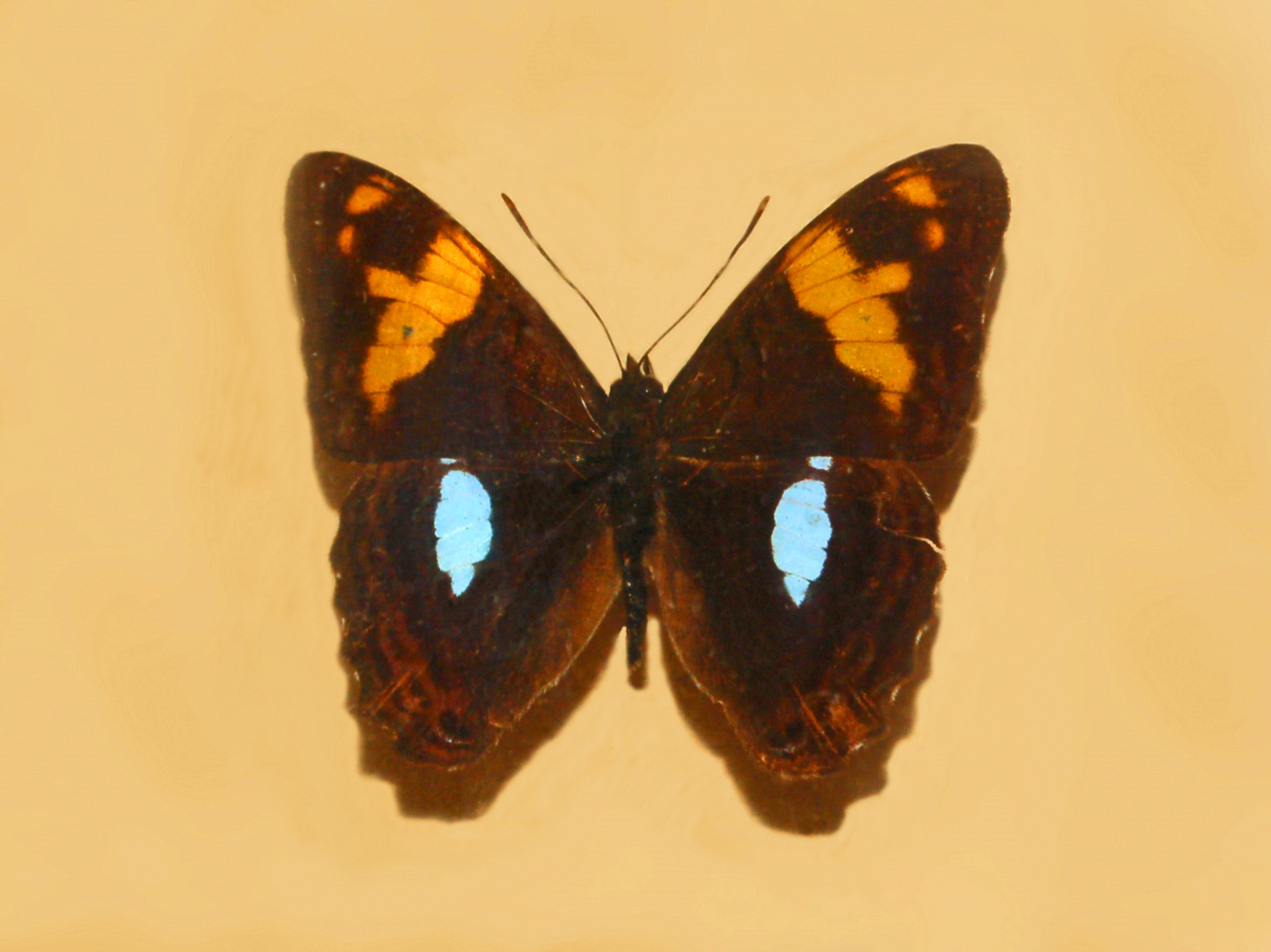
- From Colombia

Scientific classification
- Domain: Eukaryota
- Kingdom: Animalia
- Phylum: Arthropoda
- Class: Insecta
- Order: Lepidoptera
- Family: Nymphalidae
- Genus: Adelpha
- Species: A. justina

Binomial name
- Adelpha justina (C. & R. Felder, 1861)

Synonyms
- Heterochroa justina C. & R. Felder, 1861; Adelpha praevalida Fruhstorfer, 1915; Adelpha justina praevalida Fruhstorfer, 1915; Adelpha valentina ophidusa Martin, [1923]; Adelpha valentina ozolis Martin, [1923]; Adelpha valentina thyrea Martin, [1923]; Adelpha justina justinella f. maira Fruhstorfer, 1915

= Adelpha justina =

Species of butterfly

Adelpha justina is a species of butterfly of the family Nymphalidae.

== Description ==
Adelpha justina has a wingspan reaching about 42 millimetres (1.7 in). The uppersides of the wings are generally brown, with an orange band crossing the forewings and a large white spot or band in the hindwings. The undersides are quite similar to the uppersides, with paler colours.

== Distribution ==
This species occurs from Guatemala to Peru, in Venezuela and in Colombia, at elevations of 600 to 1900 m above sea level.

== Subspecies ==
- A. j. justina (Colombia)
- A. j. justinella Fruhstorfer, 1907 (Venezuela)
- A. j. valentina Fruhstorfer, 1915 (Colombia, Bolivia, Ecuador, Peru)
- A. j. maira Orellana, 1996 (Venezuela)
- A. j. inesae Orellana, 1996 (Venezuela)
