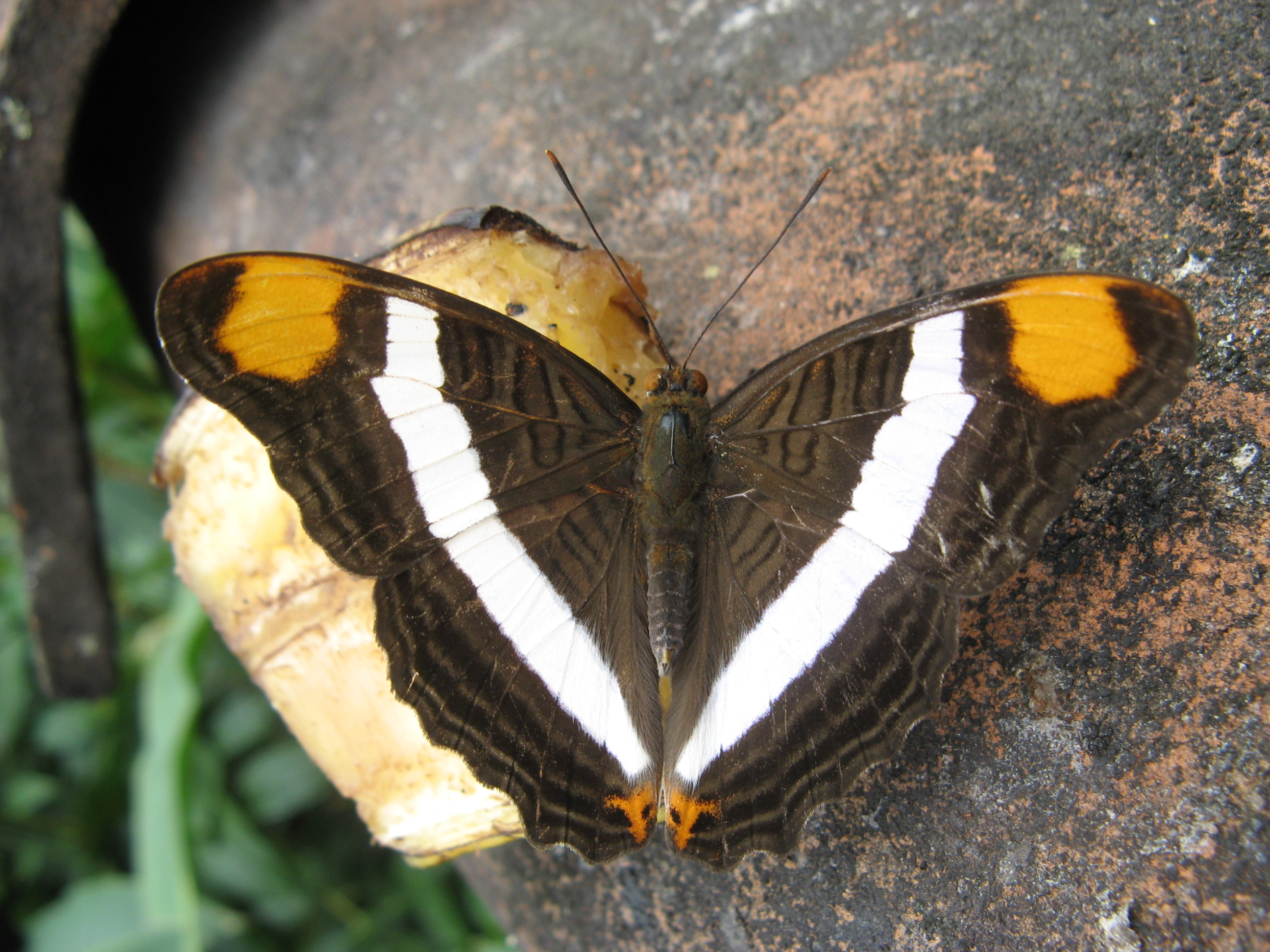
- Sucking on a banana top

Scientific classification
- Domain: Eukaryota
- Kingdom: Animalia
- Phylum: Arthropoda
- Class: Insecta
- Order: Lepidoptera
- Family: Nymphalidae
- Genus: Adelpha
- Species: A. fessonia

Binomial name
- Adelpha fessonia Hewitson, 1847

= Adelpha fessonia =

Species of butterfly

Adelpha fessonia, the band-celled sister or Mexican sister, is a species of butterfly of the family Nymphalidae. It is found in Panama north through Central America to Mexico. It is a periodic resident in the lower Rio Grande Valley, Texas.

The wingspan is 56–70 mm.

Larvae in Texas and northeastern Mexico feed on Celtis lindheimeri. Adults feed on nectar from flowers such as Cordia, Croton, and Baccharis. They also feed on decaying fruit.
