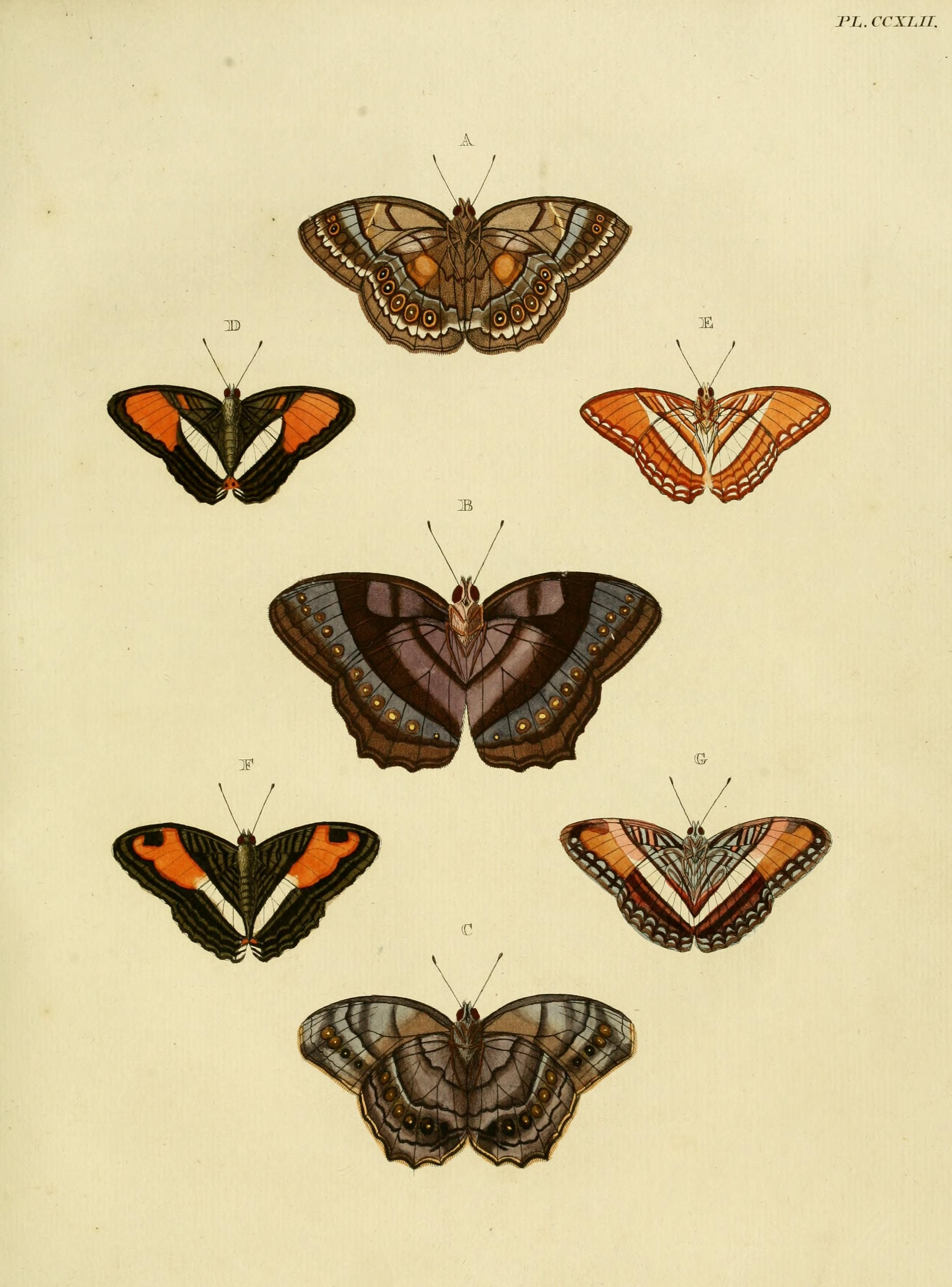
- In Pieter Cramer and Caspar Stoll's Uitlandsche Kapellen

Scientific classification
- Domain: Eukaryota
- Kingdom: Animalia
- Phylum: Arthropoda
- Class: Insecta
- Order: Lepidoptera
- Family: Nymphalidae
- Genus: Adelpha
- Species: A. cocala

Binomial name
- Adelpha cocala (Cramer, 1779)

Synonyms
- Papilio cocala Cramer, [1779]; Heterochroa urraca C. & R. Felder, 1862; Adelpha urracina Fruhstorfer, 1913; Adelpha saparua Fruhstorfer, 1913; Adelpha cocala lorzina Fruhstorfer, 1915; Heterochroa lorzae Boisduval, 1870; Adelpha cocalina Fruhstorfer, 1913; Adelpha cocalina Fruhstorfer, 1915; Adelpha fufia Fruhstorfer, 1913; Adelpha cocala fufina Fruhstorfer, 1915; Adelpha cocala riola ab. chlide d'Almeida, 1931

= Adelpha cocala =

Species of butterfly

Adelpha cocala, the cocala sister or orange-washed sister, is a butterfly of the family Nymphalidae. It was described by Pieter Cramer in 1779. It is found from Honduras to Panama, Guatemala, Venezuela, Colombia, Suriname, Peru, Bolivia and Brazil.

The wingspan is about 50 mm.

The larvae feed on Pentagonia, Psychotria, Calycophyllum, Chomelia, Uncaria and Genipa species.

== Subspecies ==
- Adelpha cocala cocala (Venezuela, Colombia, Surinam, Peru, Bolivia, Brazil: Mato Grosso)
- Adelpha cocala caninia Fruhstorfer, 1915 (Brazil: Santa Catarina, São Paulo)
- Adelpha cocala didia Fruhstorfer, 1915 (Brazil: Espírito Santo, Rio de Janeiro)
- Adelpha cocala lorzae (Boisduval, 1870) (Honduras to Panama, Guatemala, Colombia, Ecuador)
- Adelpha cocala orellanae Neild, 1996 (Venezuela)
- Adelpha cocala riola Fruhstorfer, 1915 (Brazil)
