= Adelpha radiata =

Scientific classification
- Domain: Eukaryota
- Kingdom: Animalia
- Phylum: Arthropoda
- Class: Insecta
- Order: Lepidoptera
- Family: Nymphalidae
- Genus: Adelpha
- Species: A. radiata

Binomial name
- Adelpha radiata Fruhstorfer, 1915

Species of butterfly

Adelpha radiata, the striated sister, is a butterfly of the family Nymphalidae. It was described by Hans Fruhstorfer in 1915. It is found from Costa Rica and Panama to Ecuador, Venezuela, French Guiana and Brazil.

== Subspecies ==
- A. r. radiata (Brazil: Rio de Janeiro to Santa Catharina)
- A. r. aiellae Willmott & Hall, 1999 (Panama to western Ecuador)
- A. r. explicator Willmott & Hall, 1999 (eastern Ecuador)
- A. r. gilletella Brévignon, 1995 (French Guiana)
- A. r. myrlea Fruhstorfer, 1915 (Brazil: Espirito Santo to Rio de Janeiro)
- A. r. romeroi Willmott & Neild, 2003 (Venezuela)
