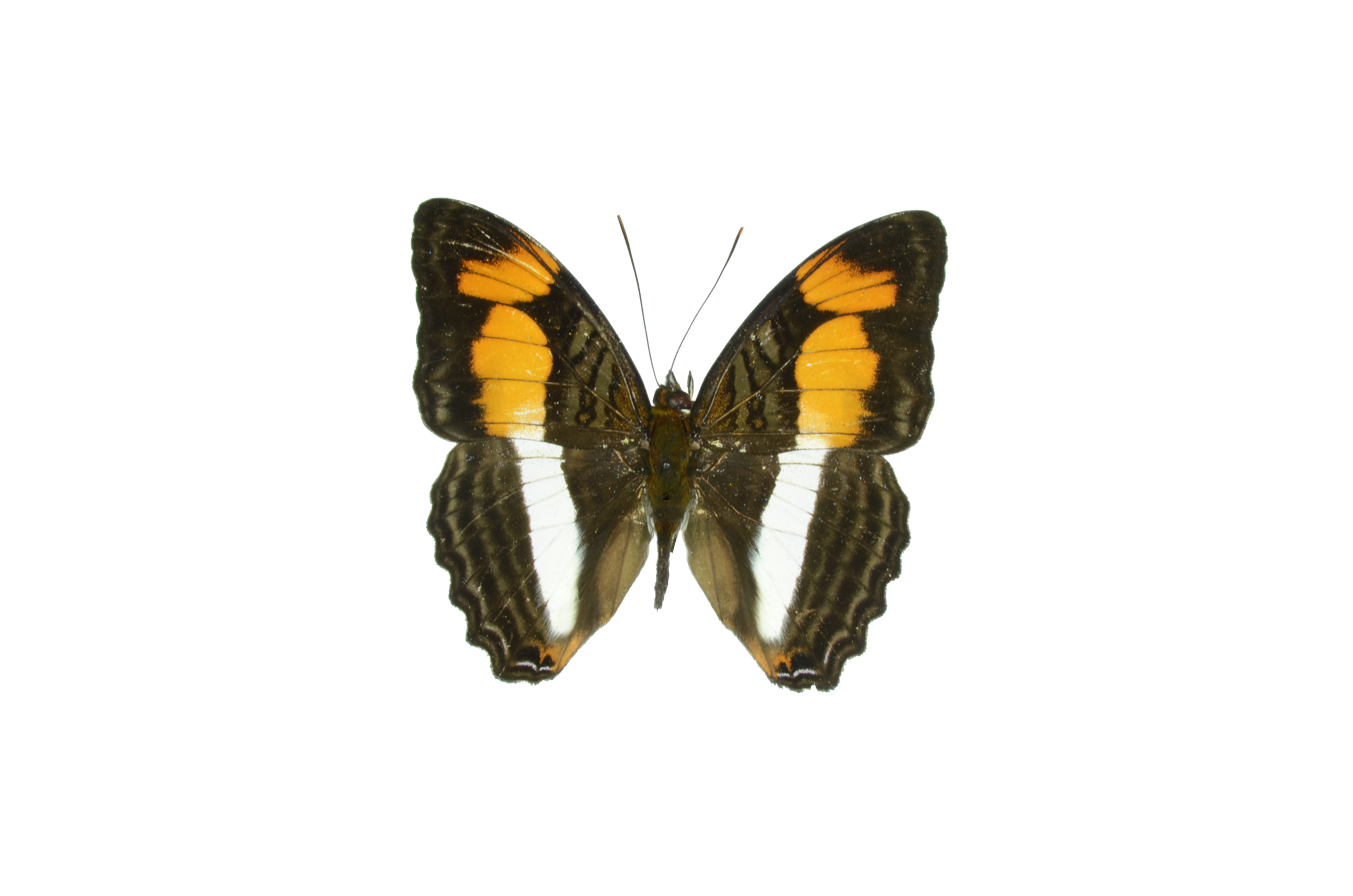
- Dorsal View
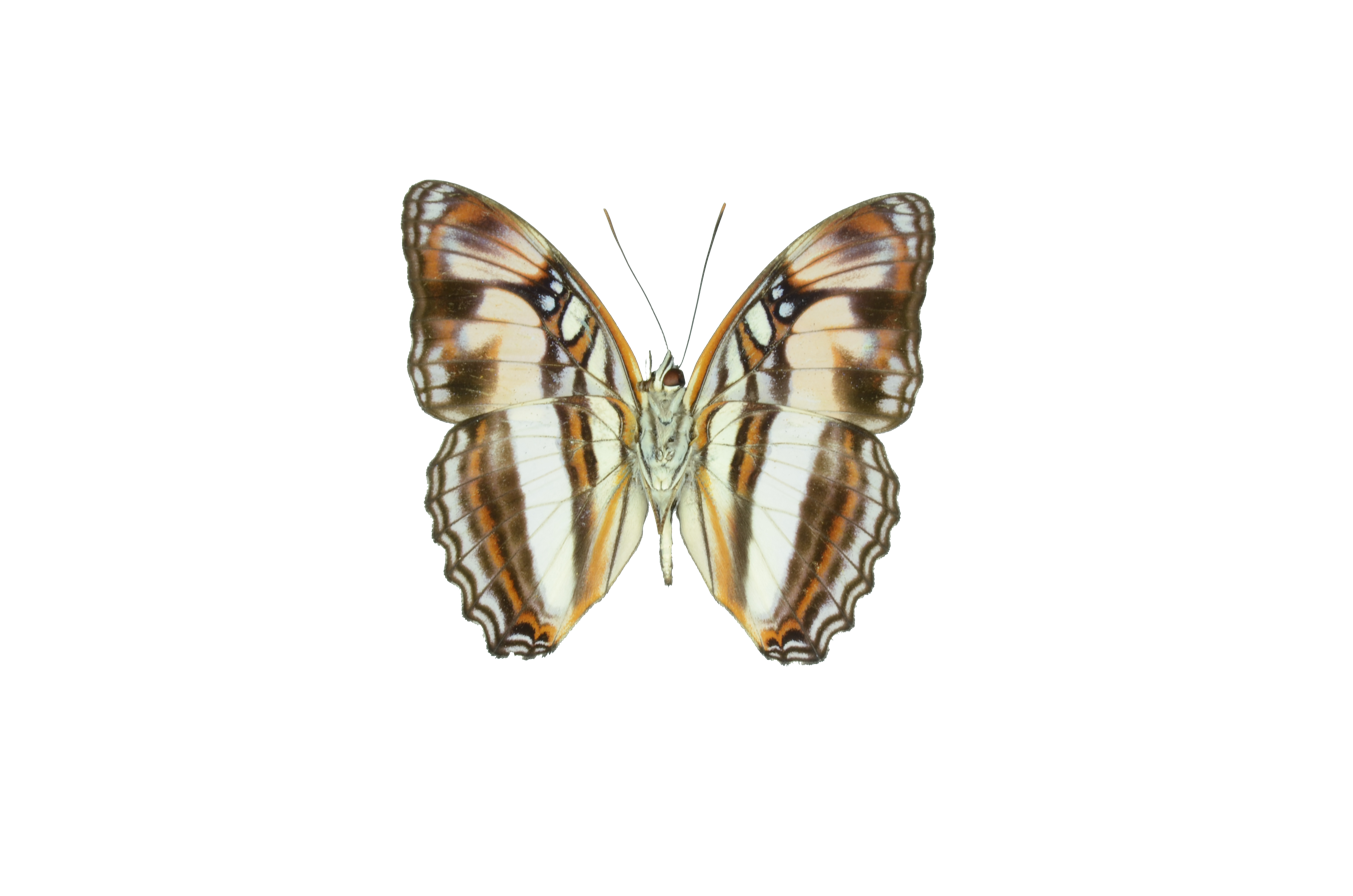
- Ventral View

Scientific classification
- Domain: Eukaryota
- Kingdom: Animalia
- Phylum: Arthropoda
- Class: Insecta
- Order: Lepidoptera
- Family: Nymphalidae
- Genus: Adelpha
- Species: A. melona

Binomial name
- Adelpha melona (Hewitson, 1847)

Synonyms
- Heterochroa melona Hewitson, 1847; Heterochroa arete Ménétries, 1857; Adelpha arete cibyra Fruhstorfer, 1915; Adelpha melona meridionalis Fruhstorfer, 1915; Adelpha biedermanni Fruhstorfer, 1915; Adelpha melona nonsecta Kaye, 1925

= Adelpha melona =

Melona sister

Species of butterfly

Adelpha melona, the Melona sister, is a species of butterfly of the family Nymphalidae. It is found in Central and South America.

The wingspan is about 50 mm.

== Subspecies ==
- A. m. melona (Brazil (Pará))
- A. m. deborah Weeks, 1901 (Colombia)
- A. m. leucocoma Fruhstorfer, 1915 (Brazil (Amazonas), Trinidad)
- A. m. pseudarete Fruhstorfer, 1915
- A. m. neildi Willmott, 2003 (Panama)
