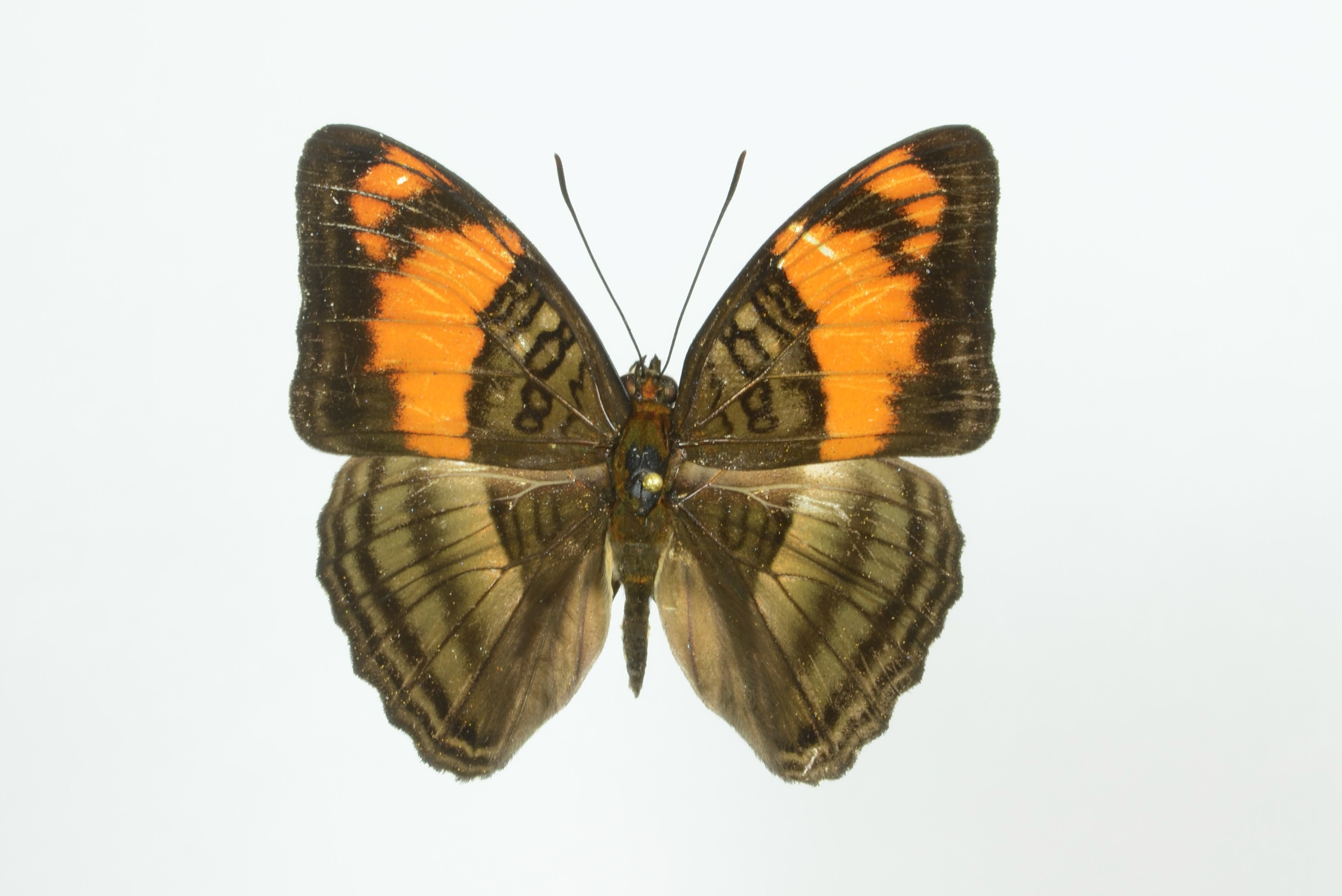

Scientific classification
- Domain: Eukaryota
- Kingdom: Animalia
- Phylum: Arthropoda
- Class: Insecta
- Order: Lepidoptera
- Family: Nymphalidae
- Genus: Adelpha
- Species: A. mesentina

Binomial name
- Adelpha mesentina Cramer, 1777

Synonyms
- Papilio mesentina Cramer, 1777; Adelpha mesentina var. chancha Staudinger, 1886

= Adelpha mesentina =

Mesentina sister

Species of butterfly

Adelpha mesentina, the mesentina sister, is a species of butterfly of the family Nymphalidae. It is found in the eastern Andes from Venezuela to Bolivia and also on the Guiana Shield and throughout the central and western Amazon basin.

The wingspan is about 54 mm.
