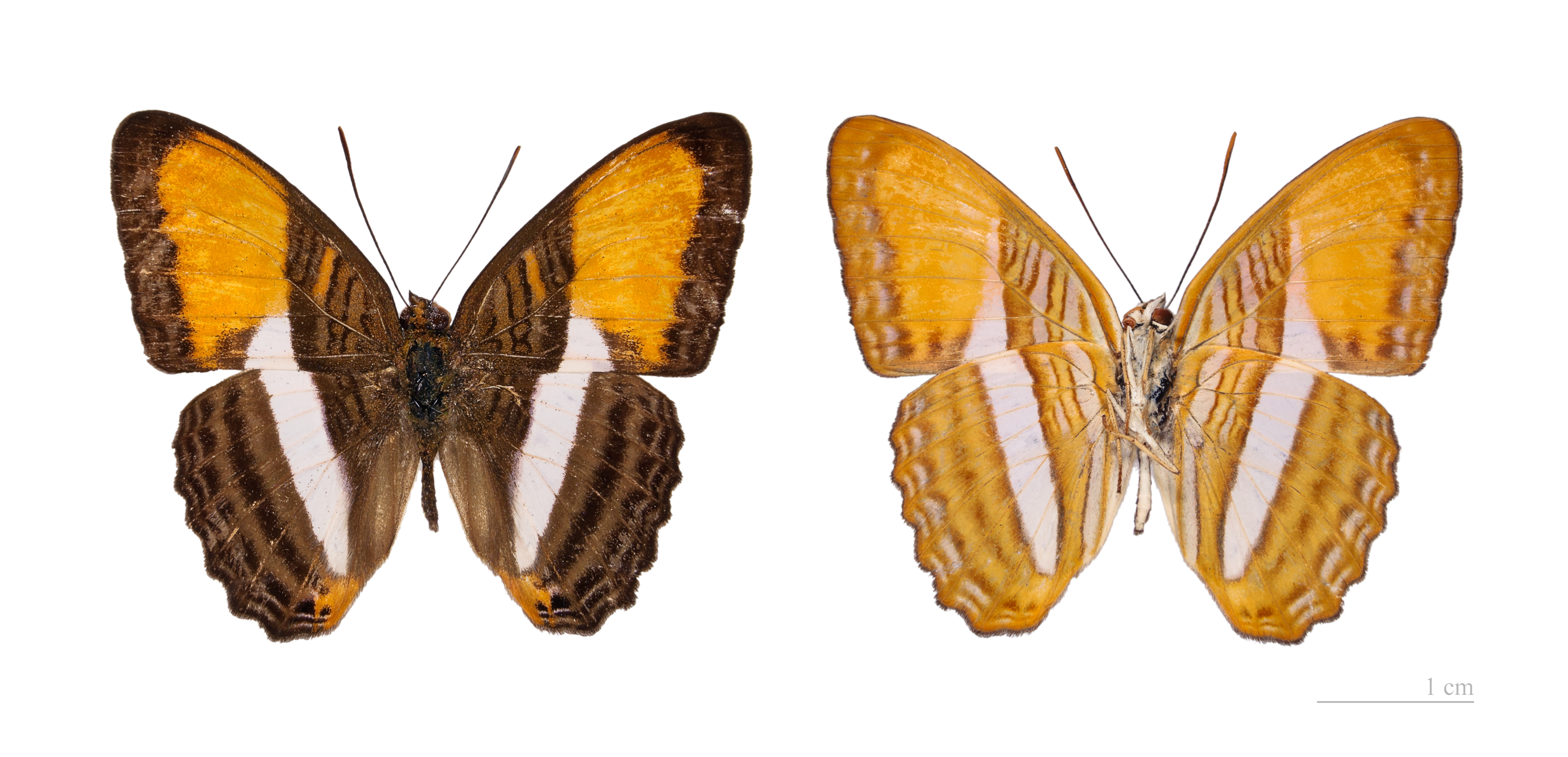

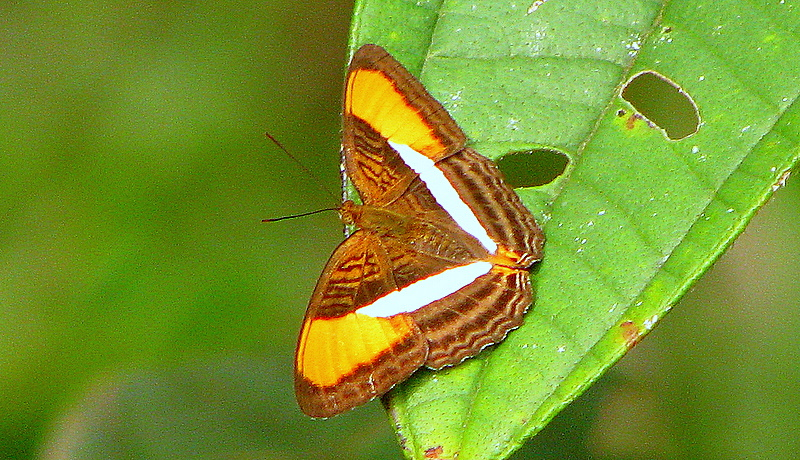

Scientific classification
- Kingdom: Animalia
- Phylum: Arthropoda
- Class: Insecta
- Order: Lepidoptera
- Family: Nymphalidae
- Genus: Adelpha
- Species: A. cytherea

Binomial name
- Adelpha cytherea (Linnaeus, 1758)

Synonyms
- Papilio cytherea Linnaeus, 1758; Papilio eleus Linnaeus, 1758; Papilio elaea Müller, 1774; Adelpha lanilla Fruhstorfer, 1913; Adelpha lanilla Fruhstorfer, 1915; Heterochroa aea C. & R. Felder, [1867]; Adelpha cytherea herennia Fruhstorfer, 1915; Adelpha cytherea daguana Fruhstorfer, 1913; Adelpha daguana Fruhstorfer, 1915; Adelpha tarratia Fruhstorfer, 1913; Adelpha tarratia Fruhstorfer, 1915; Adelpha cytherea despoliata Fruhstorfer, 1915; Heterochroa olbia C. & R. Felder, [1867]; Adelpa nahua Grose-Smith, 1898; Adelpha wernickei Röber, 1923

= Adelpha cytherea =

Smooth-banded sister

Species of butterfly

Adelpha cytherea, the smooth-banded sister, is a species of butterfly of the family Nymphalidae. It is found in Central and South America.

== Subspecies ==
- A. c. cytherea (Peru, Bolivia)
- A. c. aea (C. & R. Felder, [1867]) (Brazil: Espírito Santo, Rio de Janeiro)
- A. c. daguana Fruhstorfer, 1913 (Ecuador, Colombia)
- A. c. insularis Fruhstorfer, 1913 (Trinidad)
- A. c. marcia Fruhstorfer, 1913 (Honduras and Guatemala to Colombia)
- A. c. nahua Grose-Smith, 1898 (Venezuela, Colombia)
- A. c. olbia (C. & R. Felder, [1867]) (Colombia)
