= Adelpha nea =

Nea sister

Scientific classification
- Kingdom: Animalia
- Phylum: Arthropoda
- Class: Insecta
- Order: Lepidoptera
- Family: Nymphalidae
- Genus: Adelpha
- Species: A. nea

Binomial name
- Adelpha nea (Hewitson, 1847)

Synonyms
- Heterochroa nea Hewitson, 1847; Adelpha sentia Godman & Salvin, [1884]

Species of butterfly

Adelpha nea, the Nea sister, is a butterfly of the family Nymphalidae. It was described by William Chapman Hewitson in 1847. It is found from south-eastern Mexico, Belize and Costa Rica to Venezuela and southern Peru, the Guianas and Amazonian Brazil.

The larvae feed on Miconia species.

== Subspecies ==
- Adelpha nea nea (Costa Rica to Venezuela, southern Peru, the Guianas, Amazonian Brazil)
- Adelpha nea sentia Godman & Salvin, [1884] (south-eastern Mexico, Belize)
