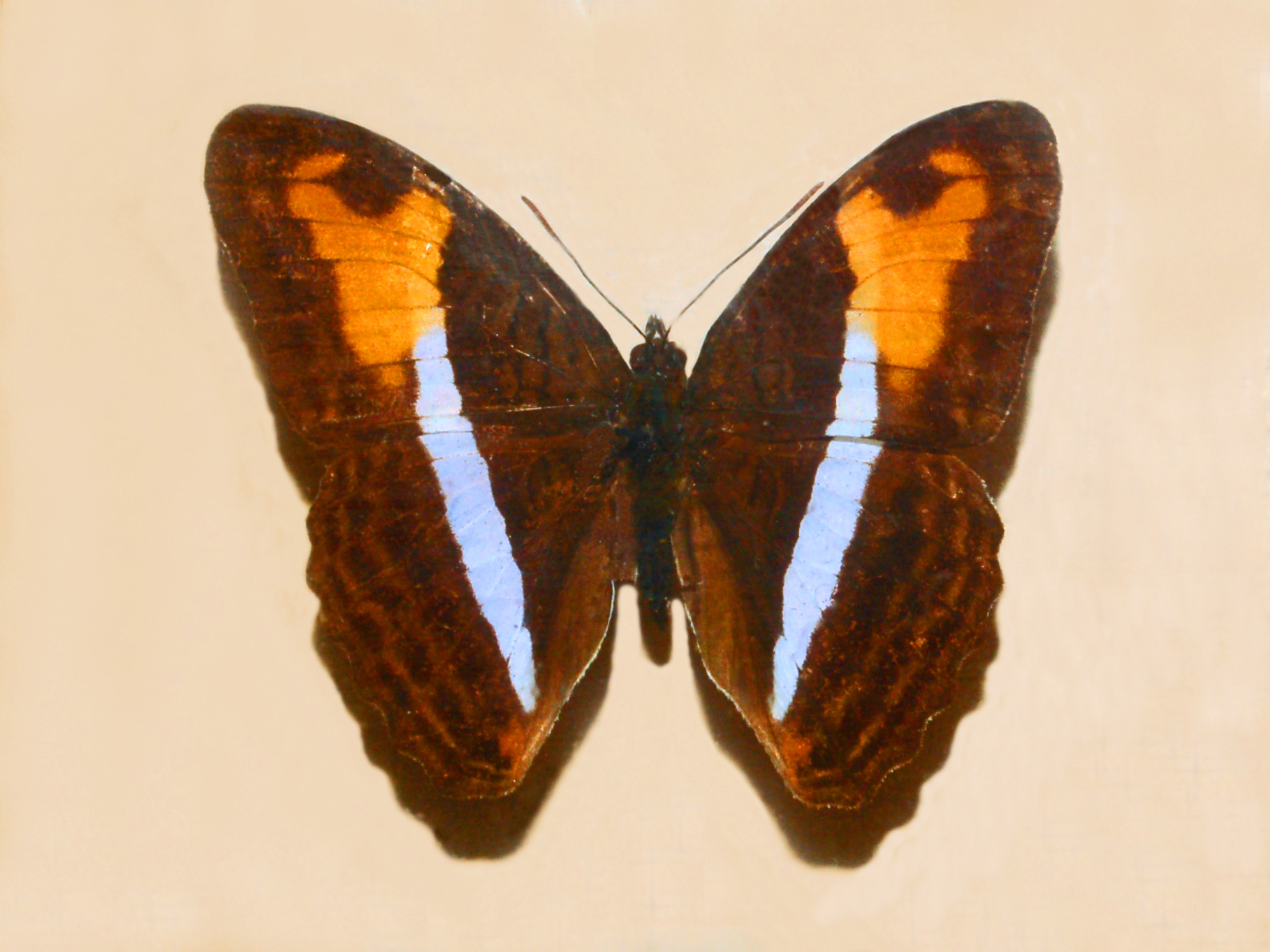
- From Brazil

Scientific classification
- Domain: Eukaryota
- Kingdom: Animalia
- Phylum: Arthropoda
- Class: Insecta
- Order: Lepidoptera
- Family: Nymphalidae
- Genus: Adelpha
- Species: A. plesaure

Binomial name
- Adelpha plesaure Hübner, 1823

Synonyms
- Adelpha plesaure Hübner, 1823; Adelpha heredia Fruhstorfer, 1915; Adelpha antoniae Fruhstorfer, 1915; Adelpha plesaure Hübner, [1819] (nom. nud.); Adelpha plesaure hereida Fruhstorfer, 1915; Adelpha plesaure antoniae Fruhstorfer, 1915; Heterochroa euboea C. & R. Felder, [1867]; Adelpha phliassa bartolme Fruhstorfer, 1915; Adelpha phliassa implicata Fruhstorfer, 1915; Adelpha plesaure cerachates Fruhstorfer, 1915; Adelpha plesaure sirona Fruhstorfer, 1915

= Adelpha plesaure =

Species of butterfly

Adelpha plesaure, the pleasure sister, is a species of butterfly of the family Nymphalidae.

== Description ==
Adelpha plesaure has a wingspan reaching about 48 millimetres (1.9 in). The uppersides of the wings are generally deep brown. The anterior wings have a large orange patch, while the hindwings are crossed by a broad white band. The undersides are pale chocolate colour, crossed by several white bands, with brown edges.

== Distribution ==
This species can be found in Guyana, Bolivia and Brazil.

== Subspecies ==
- A. p. plesaure (Brazil)
- A. p. phliassa (Godart, 1824) (French Guiana, Suriname, Brazil, Peru, Bolivia)
- A. p. pseudomalea Hall, 1938 (Venezuela)
- A. p. symona Kaye, 1925 (Trinidad)
