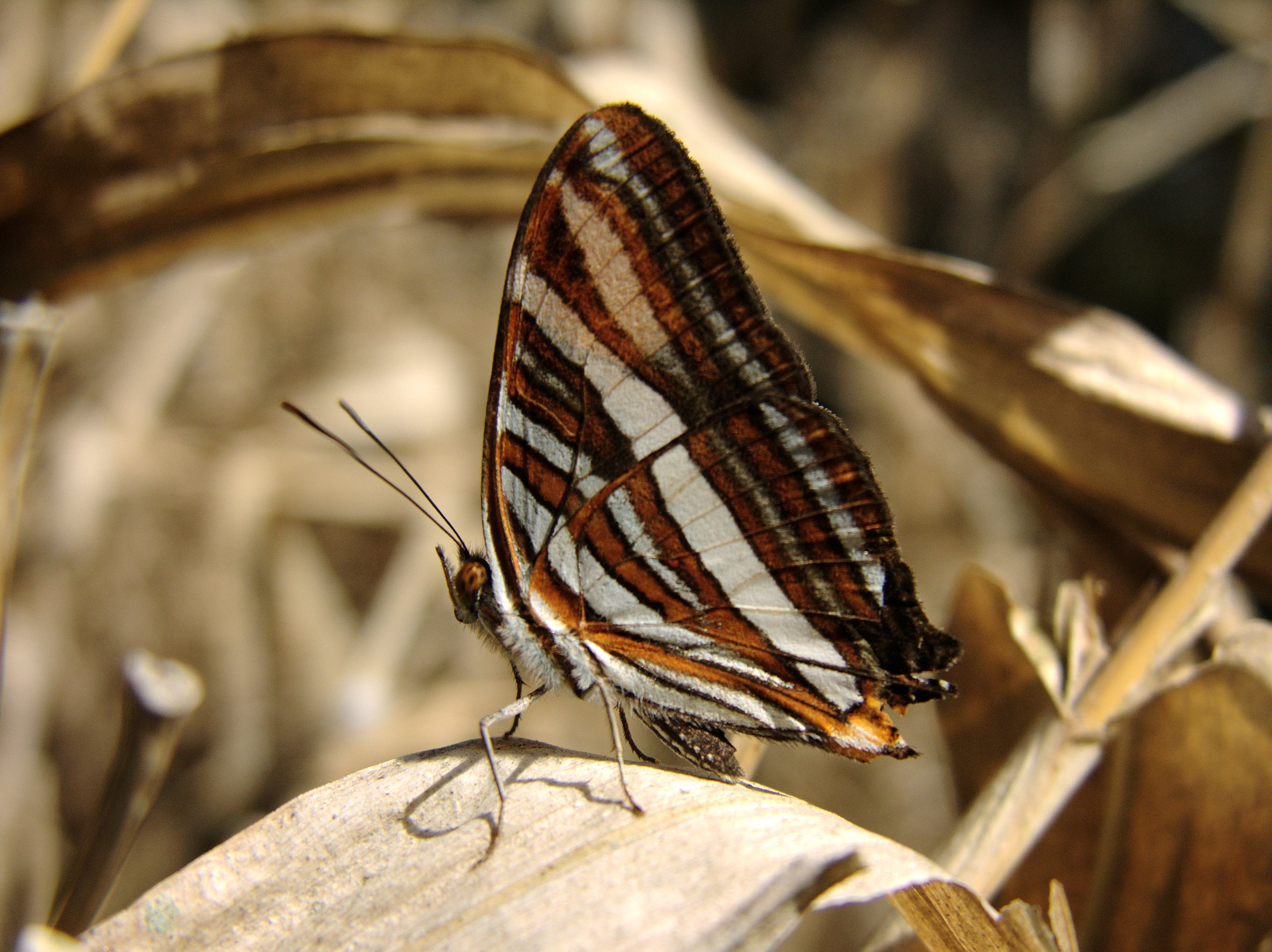

Scientific classification
- Domain: Eukaryota
- Kingdom: Animalia
- Phylum: Arthropoda
- Class: Insecta
- Order: Lepidoptera
- Family: Nymphalidae
- Genus: Adelpha
- Species: A. syma

Binomial name
- Adelpha syma (Godart, [1824])

Synonyms
- Nymphalis syma Godart, [1824]; Adelpha pravitas Fruhstorfer, 1913

= Adelpha syma =

Syma sister

Species of butterfly

Adelpha syma, the Syma sister, is a species of butterfly of the family Nymphalidae. It is found in South America, including Paraguay, Argentina, and Brazil.

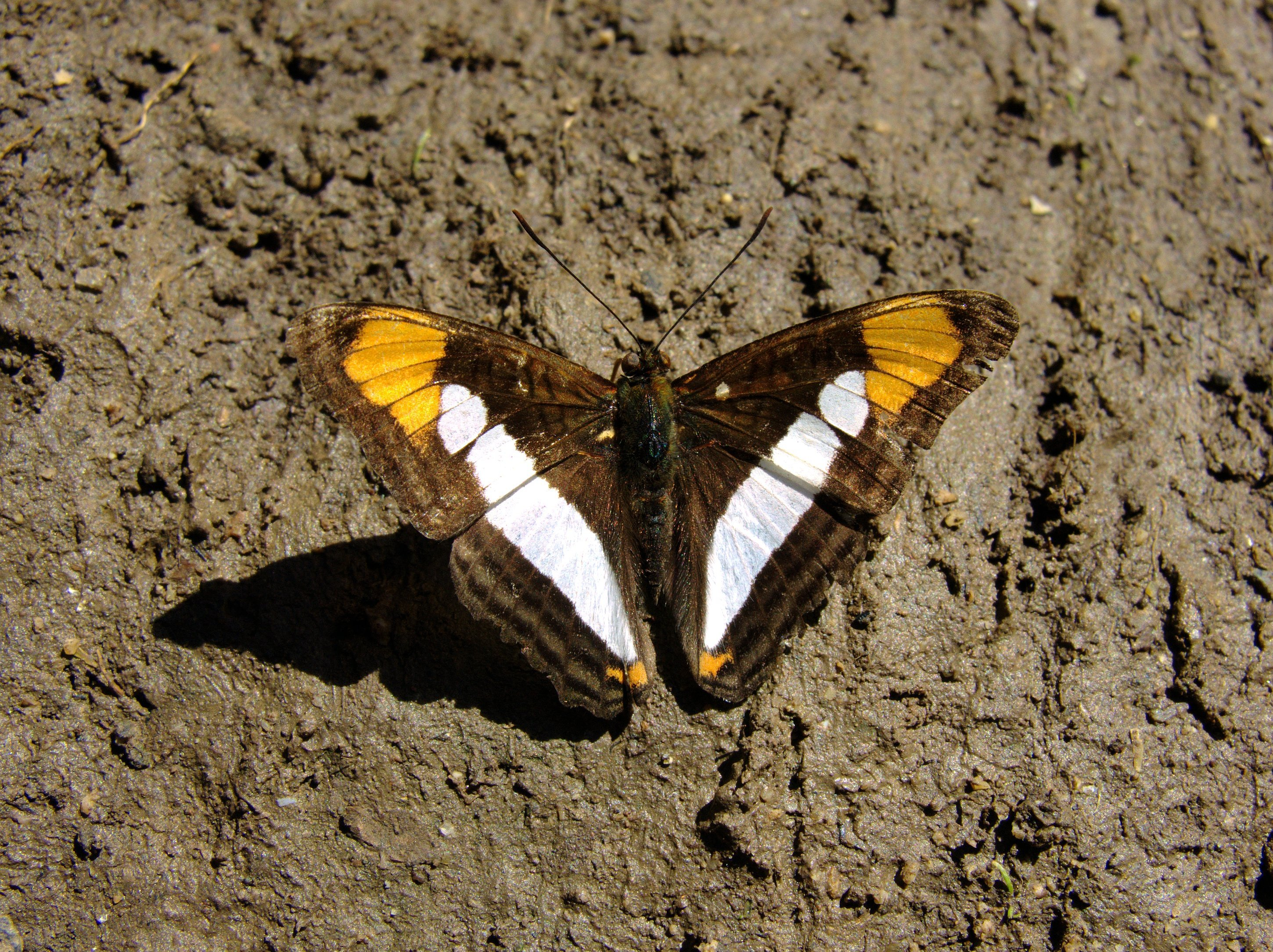

The wingspan is about 50 mm.

Larvae feed on Rubus brasiliensis and Rubus rosifolius.
