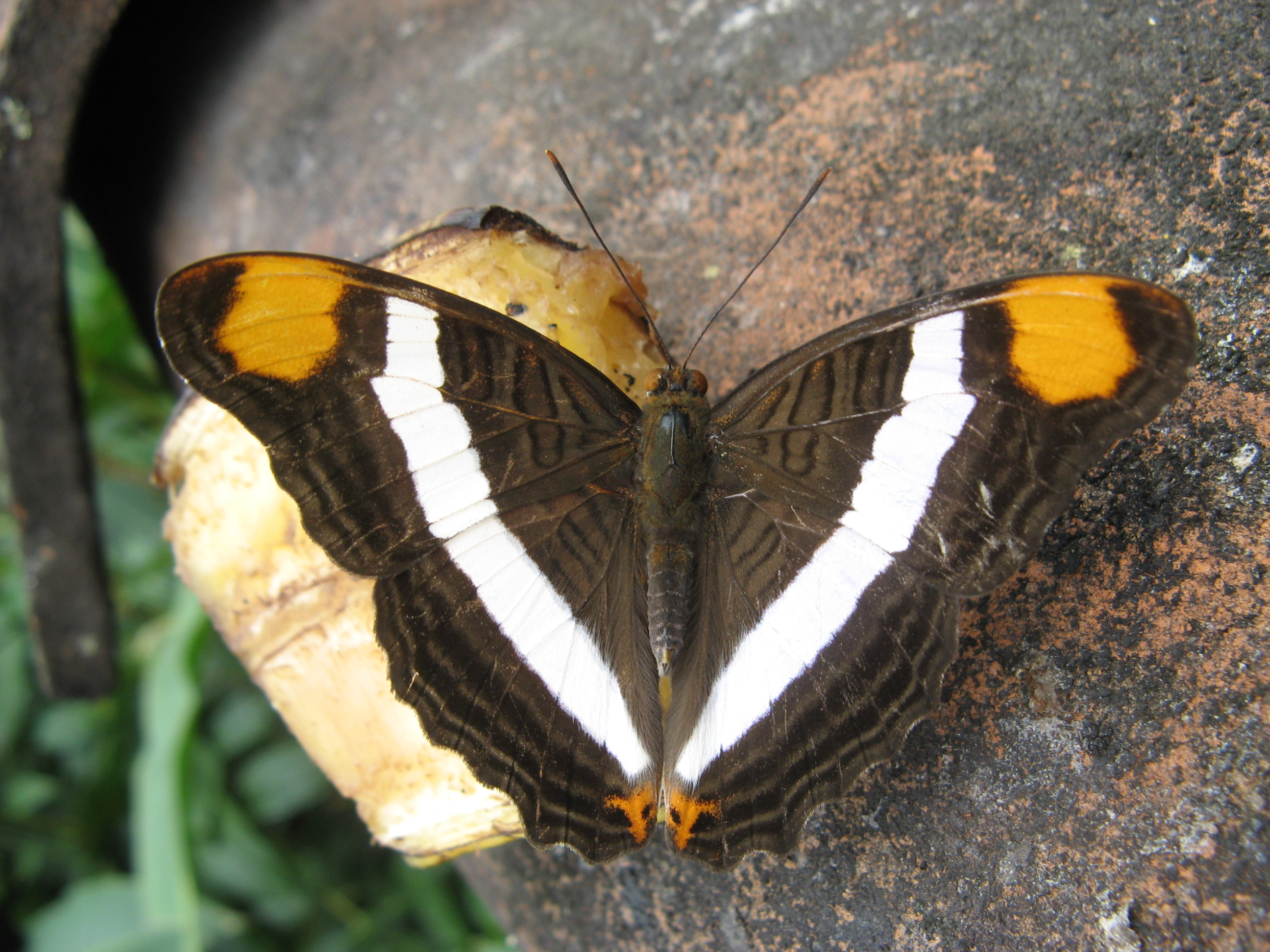
- Band-celled sister (A. fessonia)

Scientific classification
- Kingdom: Animalia
- Phylum: Arthropoda
- Clade: Pancrustacea
- Class: Insecta
- Order: Lepidoptera
- Family: Nymphalidae
- Tribe: Limenitidini
- Genus: Adelpha; Hübner, 1819

Species
- See text

Synonyms
- Heterochroa Boisduval, [1836]

= Adelpha =

Genus of brush-footed butterflies

Adelpha is a genus of brush-footed butterflies found from the southern United States and Mexico to South America. They are commonly known as sisters, due to the white markings on their wings, which resemble a nun's habit. This genus is sometimes included with the admiral butterflies (Limenitis).

== Species ==
Listed alphabetically within species group:

The alala species group:

- Adelpha alala (Hewitson, 1847) – Alala sister
- Adelpha aricia (Hewitson, 1847)
- Adelpha corcyra (Hewitson, 1847)
- Adelpha donysa (Hewitson, 1847) – montane sister
- Adelpha pithys (Bates, 1864) – pithys sister
- Adelpha tracta (Butler, 1872) – tracta sister

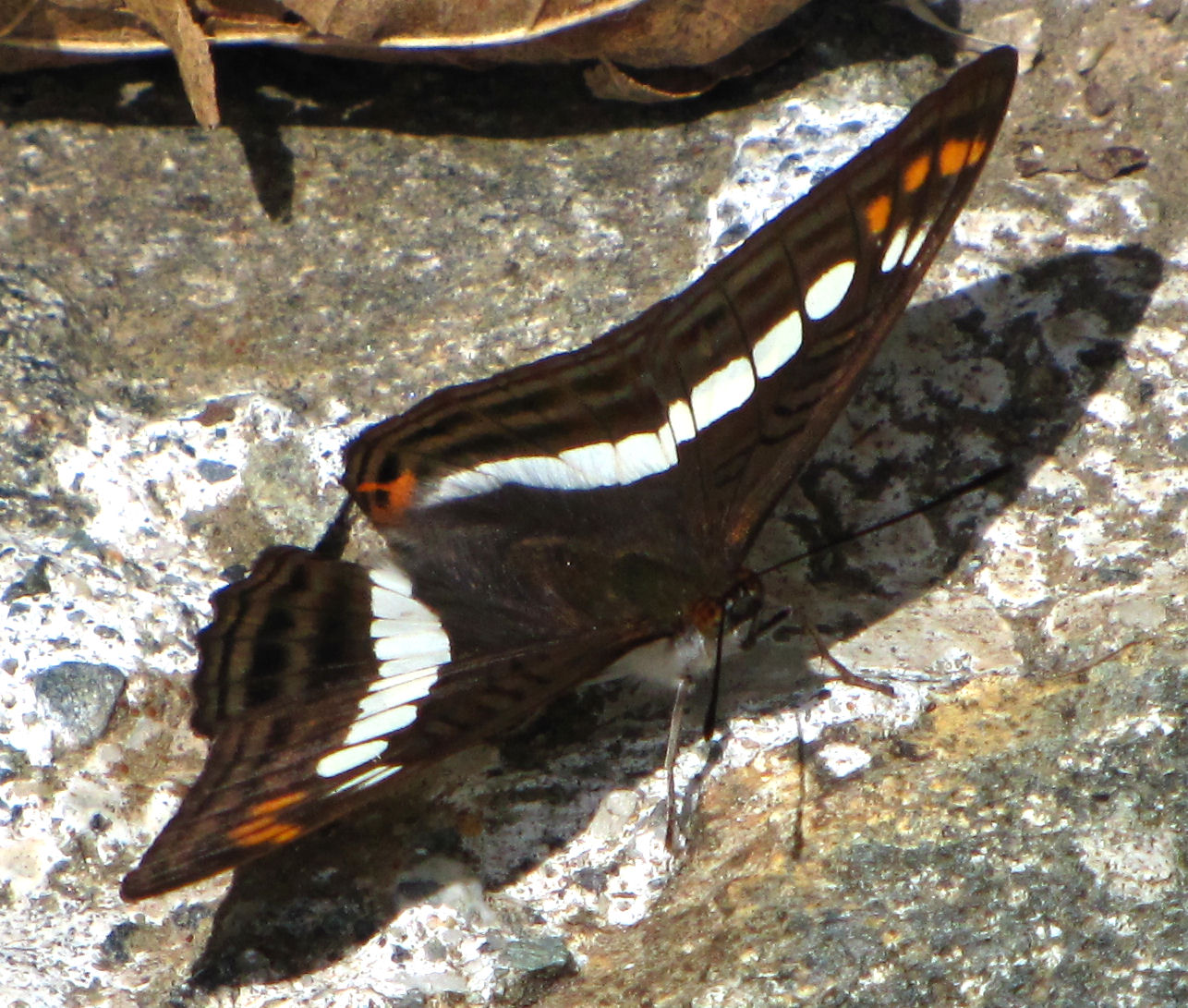
Adelpha alala

The capucinus species group:

- Adelpha barnesia Schaus, 1902 – Barnes' sister
- Adelpha capucinus (Walch, 1775) – capycinus sister
- Adelpha epizygis Fruhstorfer, 1915
- Adelpha fabricia Fruhstorfer, 1913

The cocala species group:

- Adelpha argentea Willmott & Hall, 1995
- Adelpha boreas (Butler, 1866) – gaudy sister
- Adelpha cocala (Cramer, 1779) – cocala sister, orange-washed sister
- Adelpha coryneta (Hewitson, 1874)
- Adelpha erymanthis Godman & Salvin, 1884 – Godman's sister
- Adelpha felderi (Boisduval, 1870) – rusty sister, Felder's sister
- Adelpha irmina (Doubleday, 1848) – Irmina sister
- Adelpha jordani (Fruhstorfer, 1913) – Jordan's sister
- Adelpha justina (C. & R. Felder, 1861)
- Adelpha lamasi Willmott & Hall, 1999
- Adelpha leucophthalma (Latreille, 1809) – Veracruz sister
- Adelpha levona Steinhauser & Miller, 1977
- Adelpha milleri Beutelspacher, 1976 – cloistered sister
- Adelpha olynthia (C. & R. Felder, 1867) – Olynthia sister
- Adelpha rothschildi Fruhstorfer, 1913
- Adelpha salus Hall, 1935 – lost sister
- Adelpha saundersii (Hewitson, 1867) – Saunder's sister
- Adelpha shuara Willmott & Hall, 1995
- Adelpha sichaeus (Butler, 1866)
- Adelpha stilesiana DeVries & Chacón, 1982
- Adelpha zina (Hewitson, 1867) – Zina sister

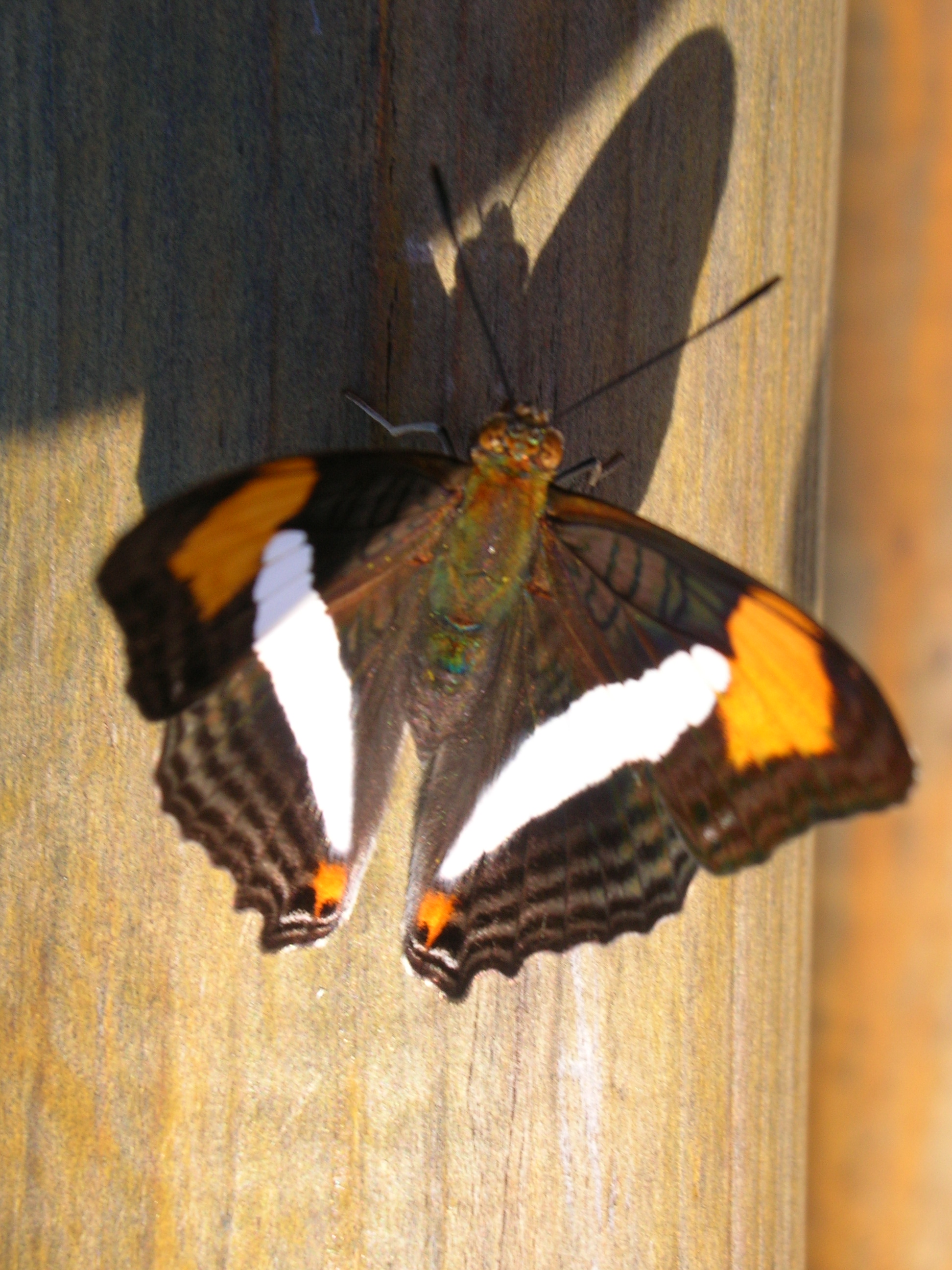
Adelpha thessalia

The iphiclus species group:

- Adelpha abyla (Hewitson, 1850) – Jamaican sister
- Adelpha basiloides (Bates, 1865) – spot-celled sister
- Adelpha calliphane Fruhstorfer, 1915
- Adelpha falcipennis Fruhstorfer, 1915
- Adelpha gavina Fruhstorfer, 1915
- Adelpha iphicleola (Bates, 1864) – confusing sister
- Adelpha iphiclus (Linnaeus, 1758) – pointed sister
- Adelpha mythra (Godart, 1824) – Mythra sister
- Adelpha plesaure Hübner, 1823 – pleasure sister
- Adelpha poltius Hall, 1938
- Adelpha thessalia (C. & R. Felder, 1867) – Thessalia sister
- Adelpha thoasa (Hewitson, 1850) – thoasa sister

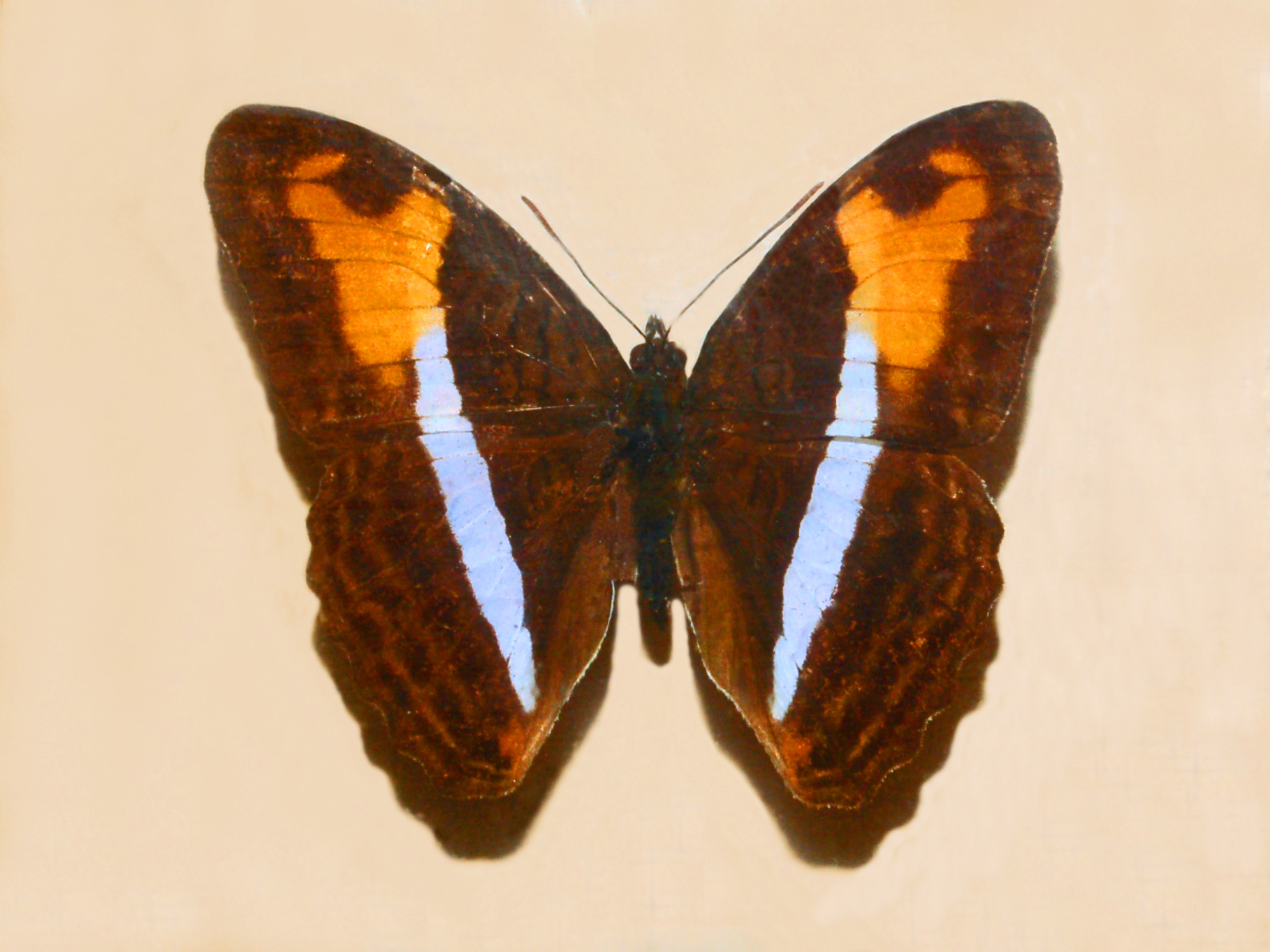
Adelpha plesaure

The phylaca species group:

- Adelpha erotia (Hewitson, 1847) – stitched sister
- Adelpha lycorias (Godart, 1824) – rayed sister
- Adelpha mesentina (Cramer, 1777) – mesentina sister
- Adelpha phylaca (Bates, 1866) – Cecropia sister
- Adelpha messana (C. & R. Felder, 1867) – Messana or Thesprotia sister

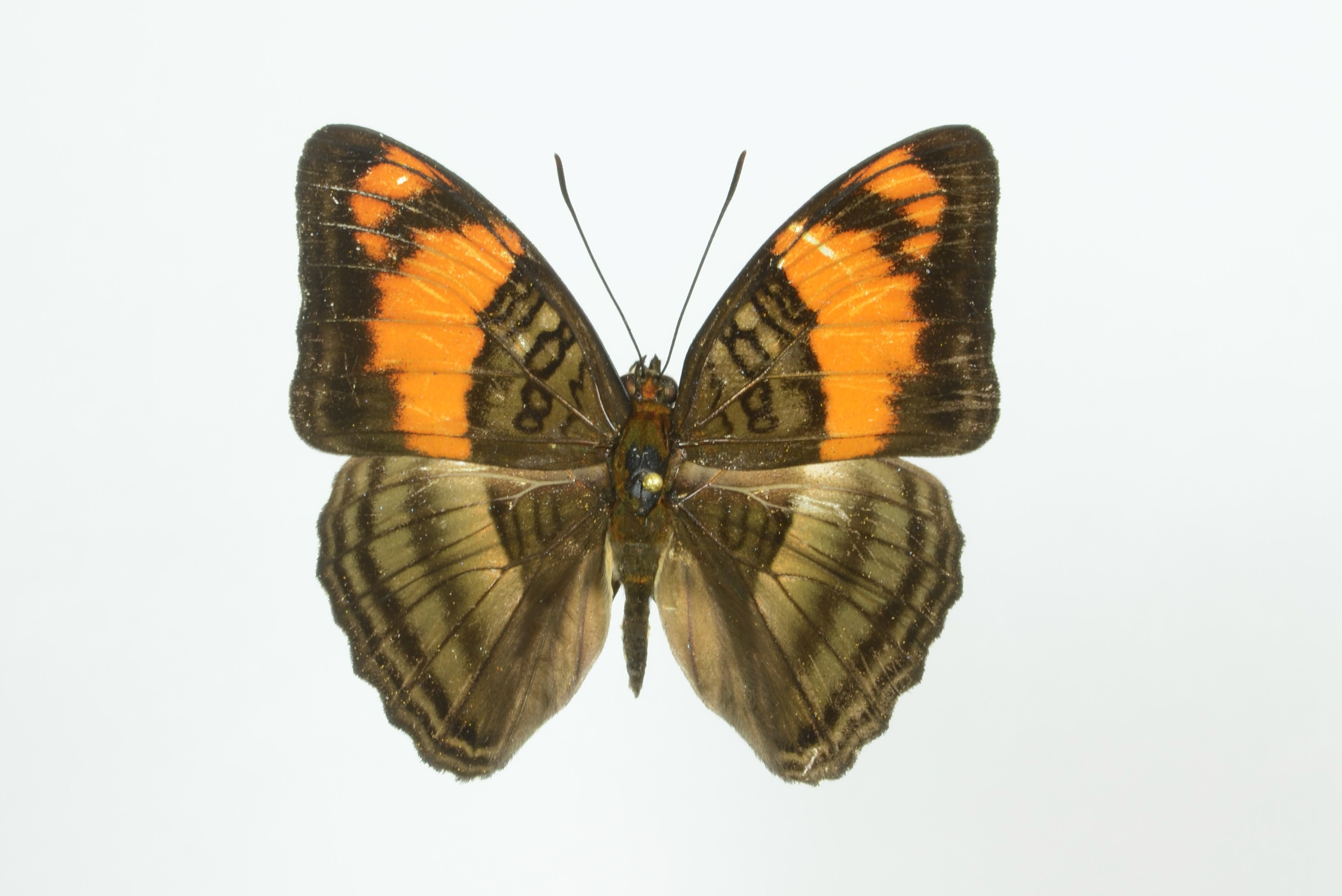
A. mesentina

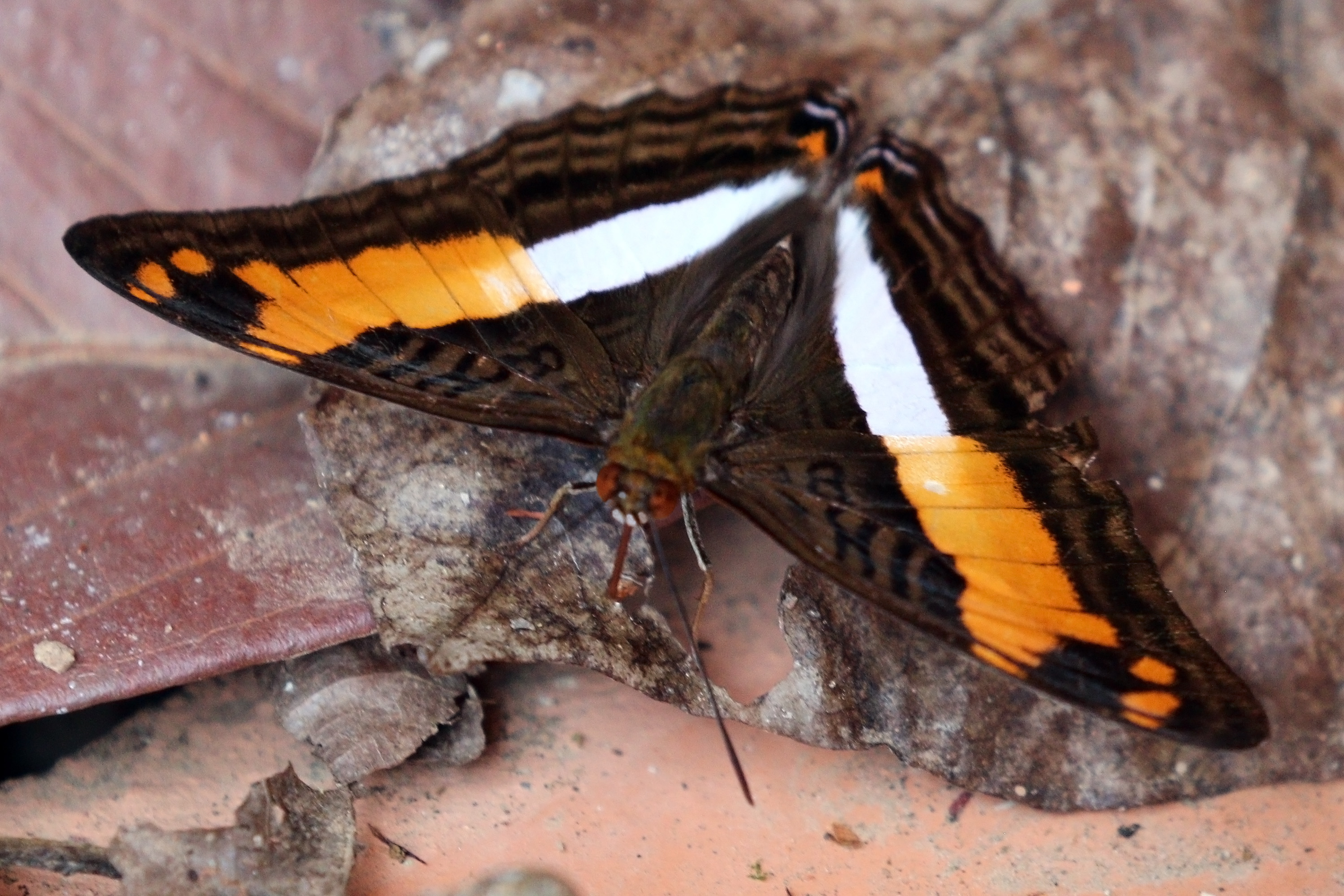
A. messana delphicola Southern Amazon, Brazil

The serpa species group:

- Adelpha bredowii Geyer, 1837 – Bredow's sister
- Adelpha californica (Butler, 1865) – California sister
- Adelpha diocles Godman & Salvin, 1878 – tailed sister
- Adelpha eulalia E. Doubleday, 1848) – Arizona sister
- Adelpha herbita Weymer, 1907
- Adelpha hyas (Doyère, 1840)
- Adelpha nea (Hewitson, 1847) – Nea sister
- Adelpha paraena (Bates, 1865) – Massilia sister, Bates' sister
- Adelpha paroeca (Bates, 1864) – eyed sister
- Adelpha radiata Fruhstorfer, 1915 – striated sister
- Adelpha seriphia (C. & R. Felder, 1867) – dentate sister
- Adelpha serpa (Boisduval, 1836) – celerio sister, celadon sister
- Adelpha zea (Hewitson, 1850) – Zea sister

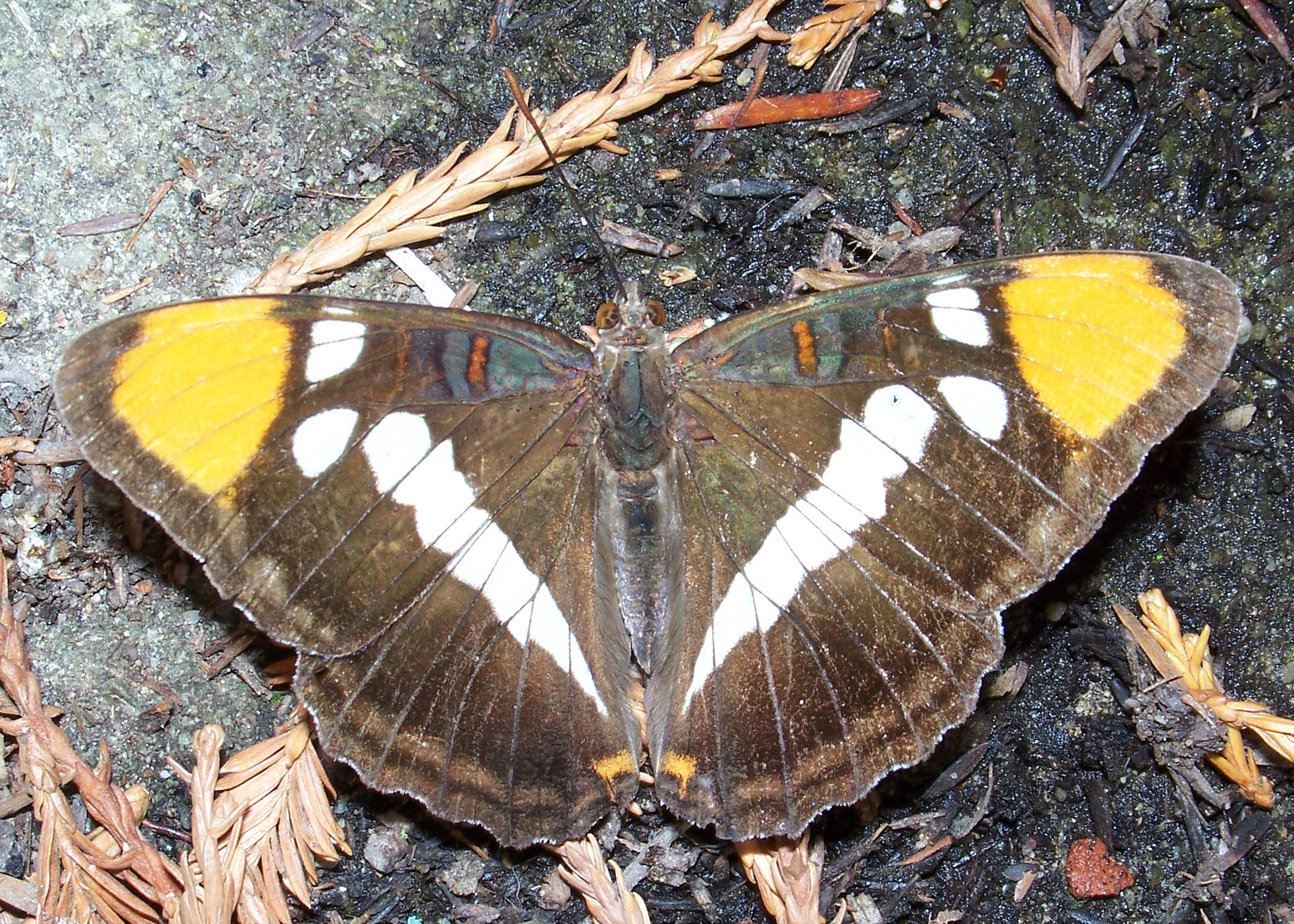
Adelpha californica

Ungrouped:

- Adelpha abia (Hewitson, 1850)
- Adelpha amazona Austin & Jasinski, 1999
- Adelpha atlantica Willmott, 2003
- Adelpha attica (C. & R. Felder, 1867) – Attica sister
- Adelpha boeotia (C. & R. Felder, 1867) – Felder's sister
- Adelpha cytherea (Linnaeus, 1758) – smooth-banded sister
- Adelpha demialba (Butler, 1872) – white-spotted sister
- Adelpha delinita Fruhstorfer, 1913 – Fruhstorfer's Sister or delineated sister
- Adelpha diazi Beutelspacher, 1975 – Diaz's sister
- Adelpha ethelda (Hewitson, 1867) – silver-banded sister
- Adelpha epione (Godart, 1824) – white-barred sister
- Adelpha fessonia (Hewitson, 1847) – Mexican sister, band-celled sister
- Adelpha gelania (Godart, 1824) – Antillean sister
- Adelpha heraclea (C. & R. Felder, 1867) – Heraclea sister
- Adelpha hesterbergi Willmott & Hall, 1999
- Adelpha leuceria (Druce, 1874) – orange-striped sister
- Adelpha leucerioides Beutelspacher, 1975 – Veracruz sister
- Adelpha malea (C. & R. Felder, 1861) – Venezuelan sister
- Adelpha melona (Hewitson, 1847) – Mellona sister
- Adelpha naxia (C. & R. Felder, 1867) – Naxia sister, three-part sister
- Adelpha pollina Fruhstorfer, 1915
- Adelpha salmoneus (Butler, 1866) – golden-banded sister
- Adelpha syma (Godart, 1824) – Syma sister
- Adelpha viola Fruhstorfer, 1913
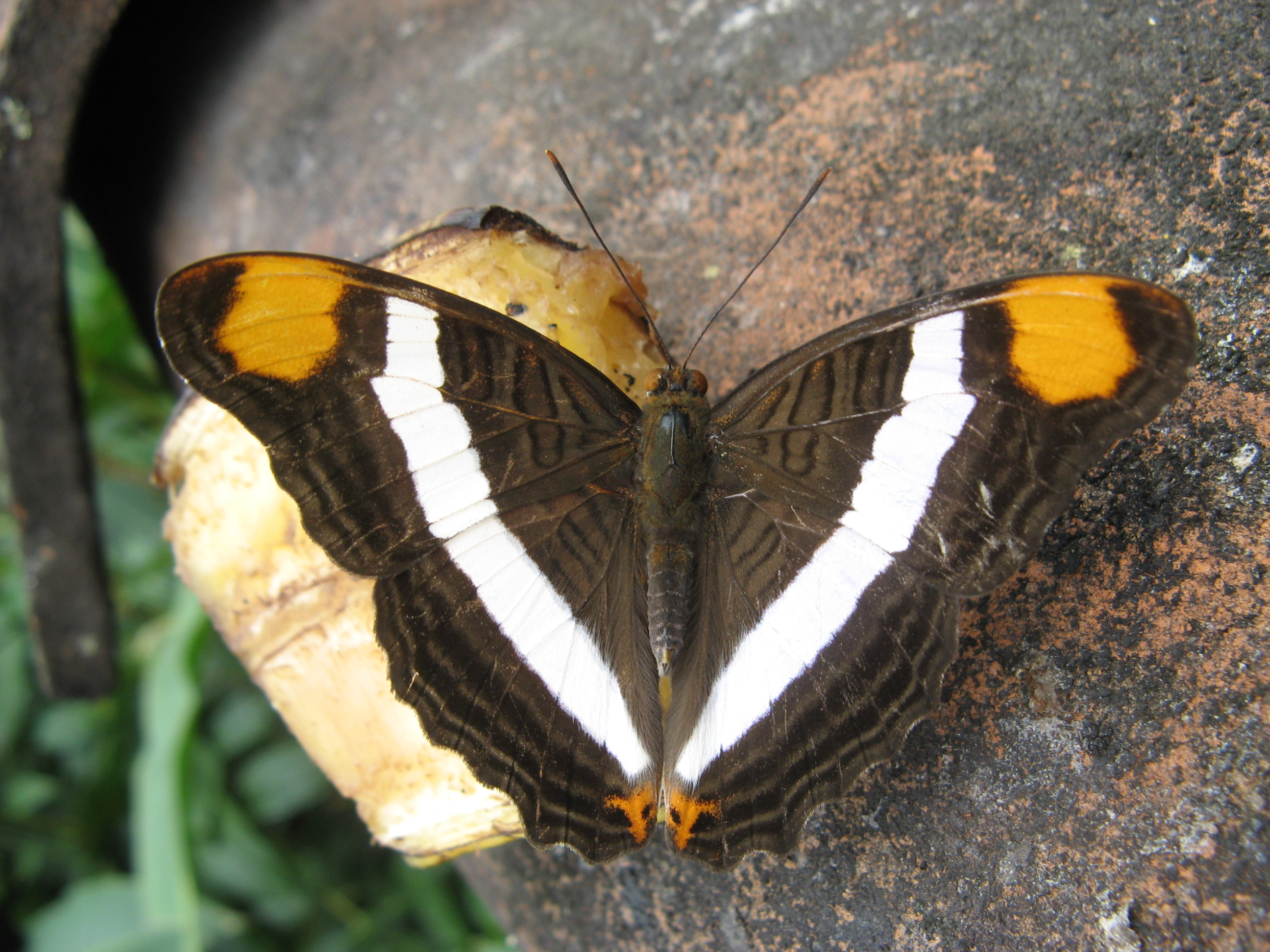
Adelpha fessonia

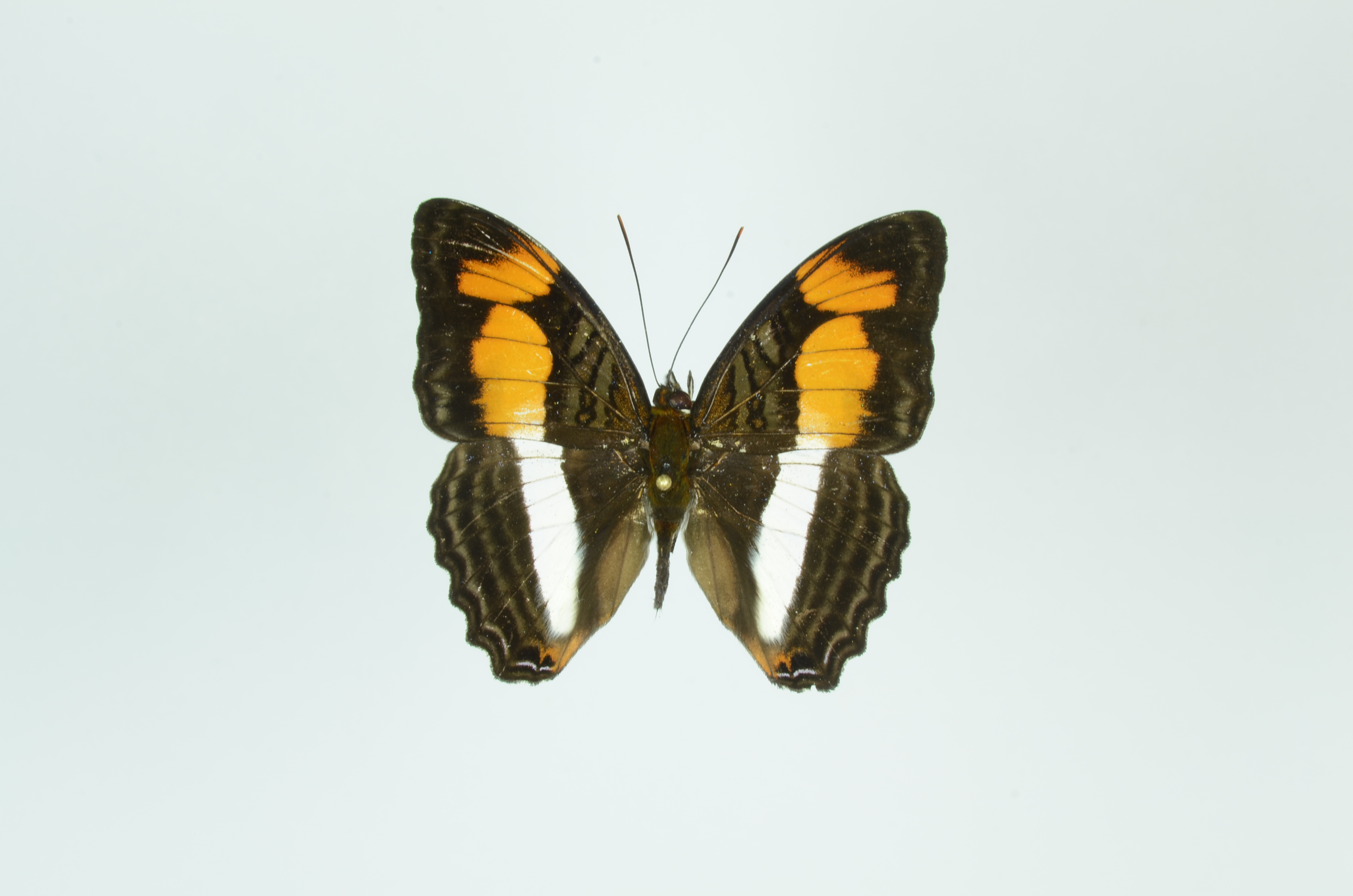
Adelpha melona

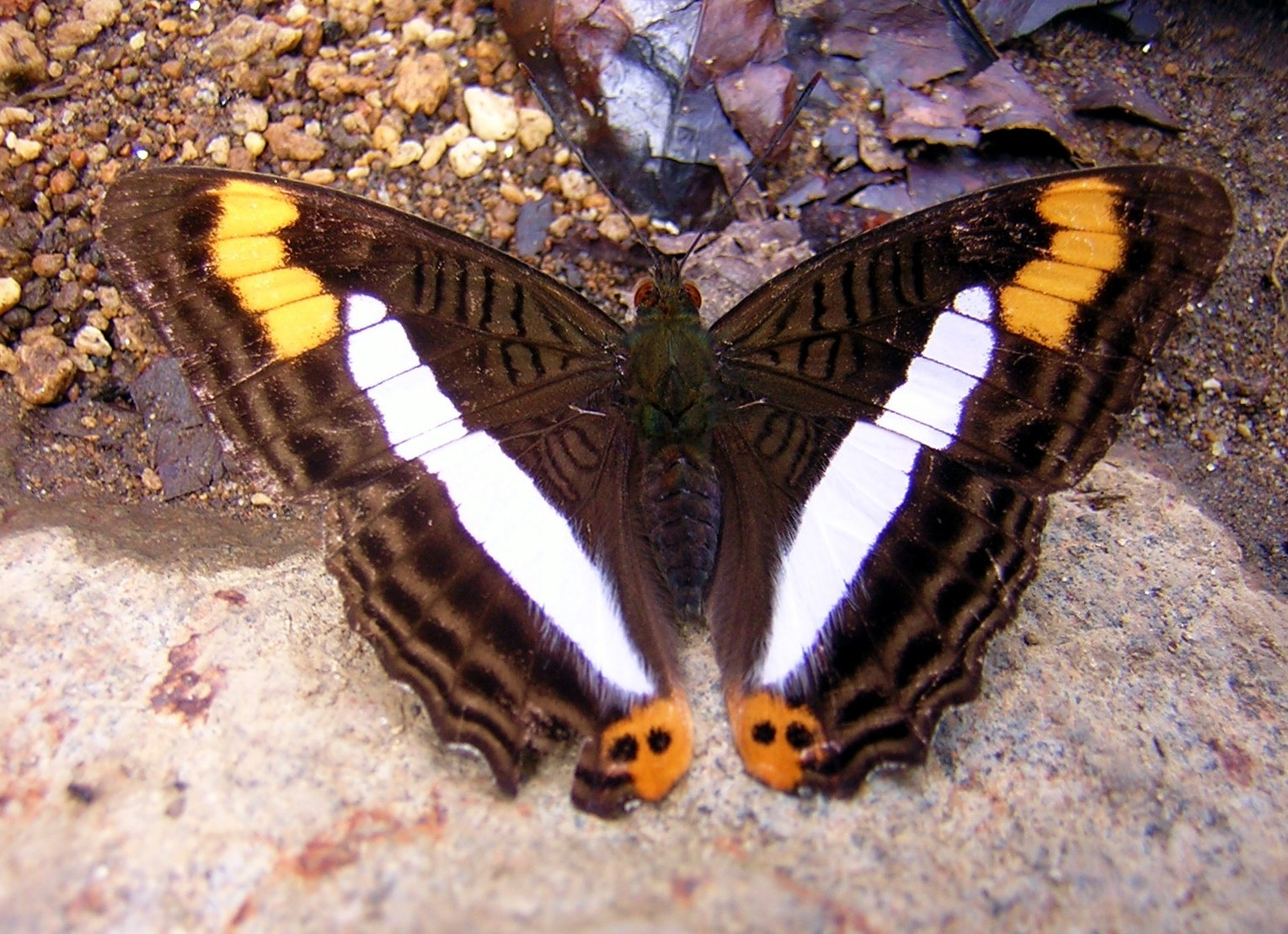
Adelpha syma

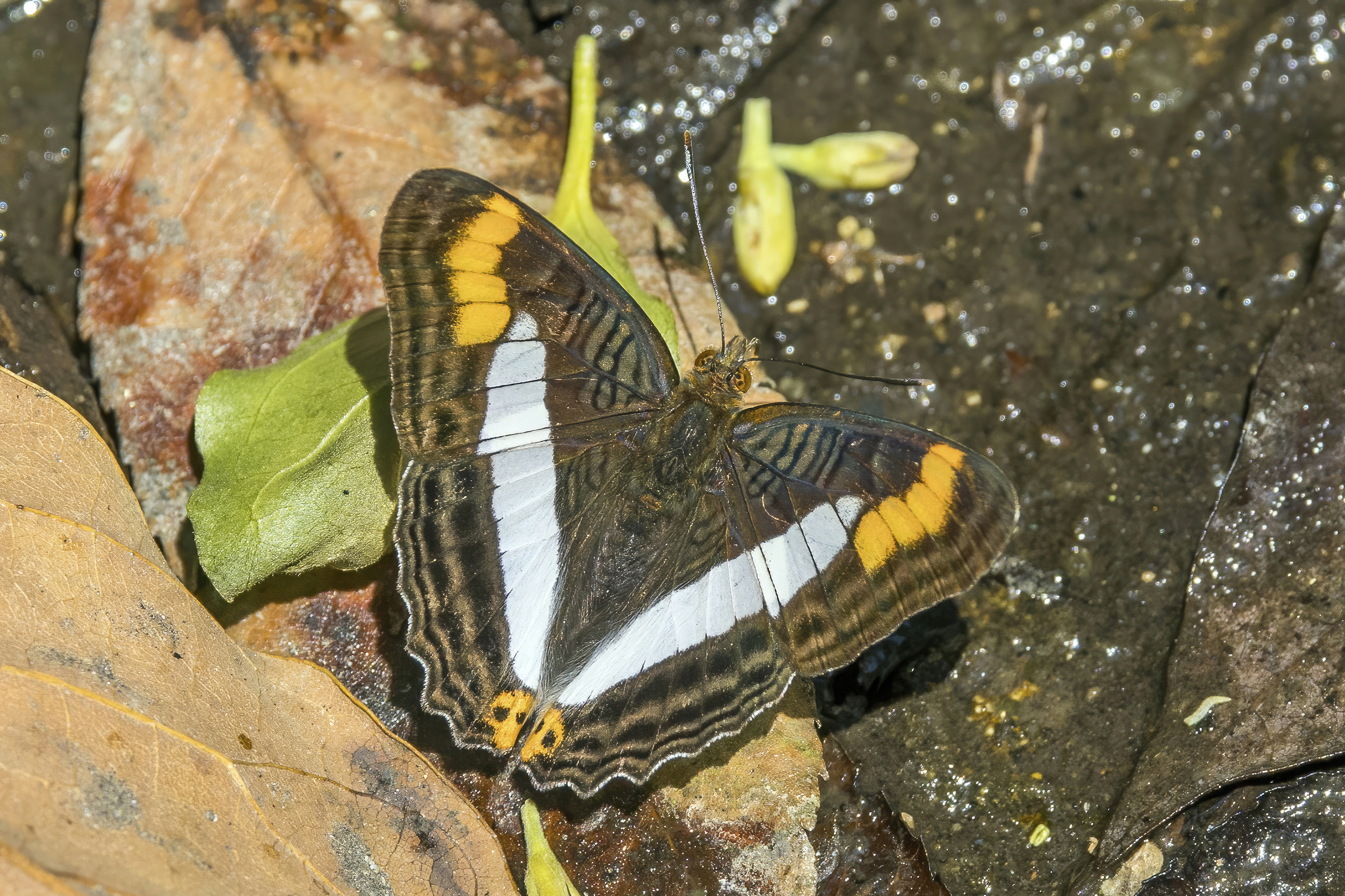
Montane sister (Adelpha donysa), Guatemala

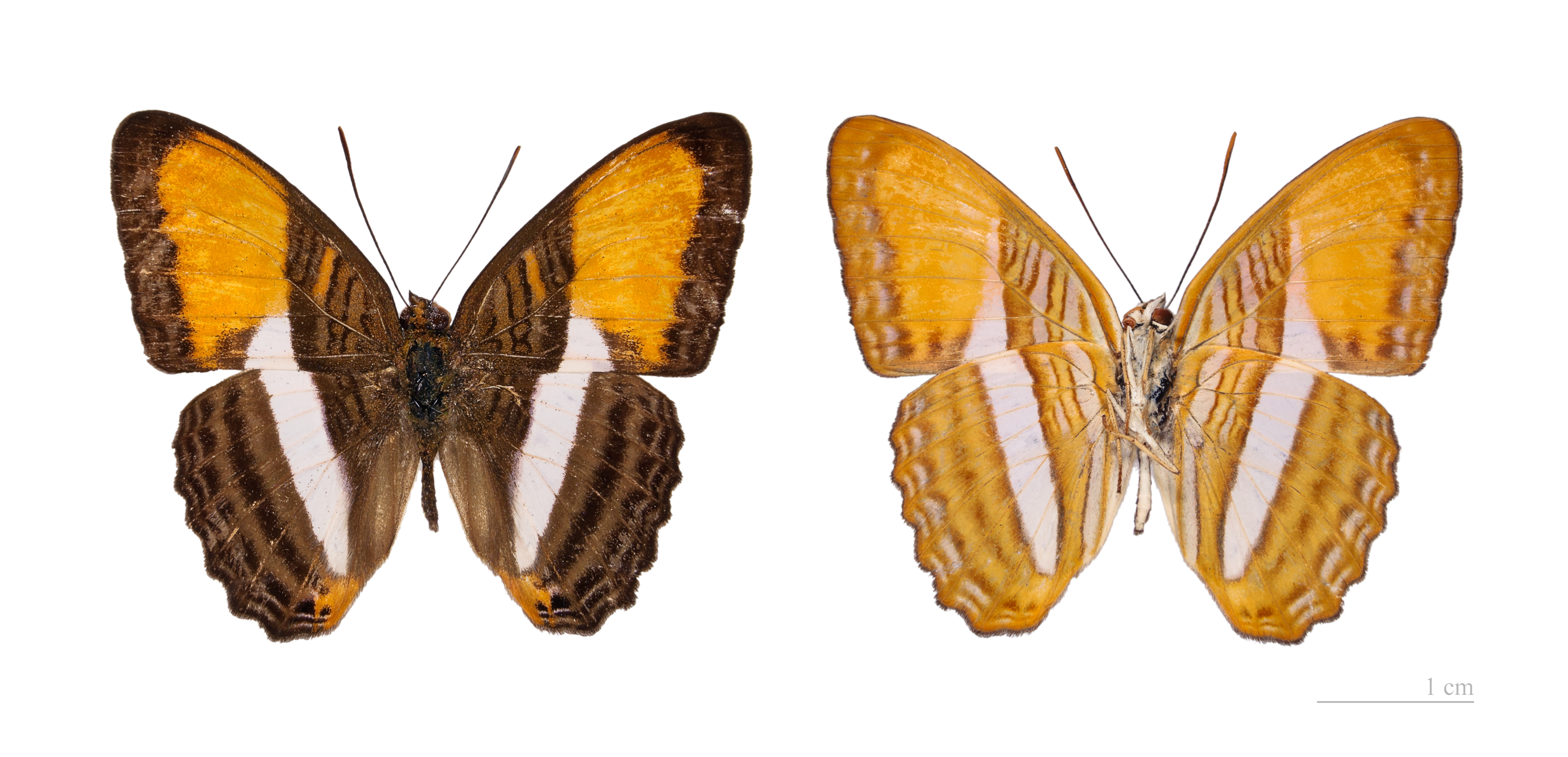
Adelpha cytherea - MHNT

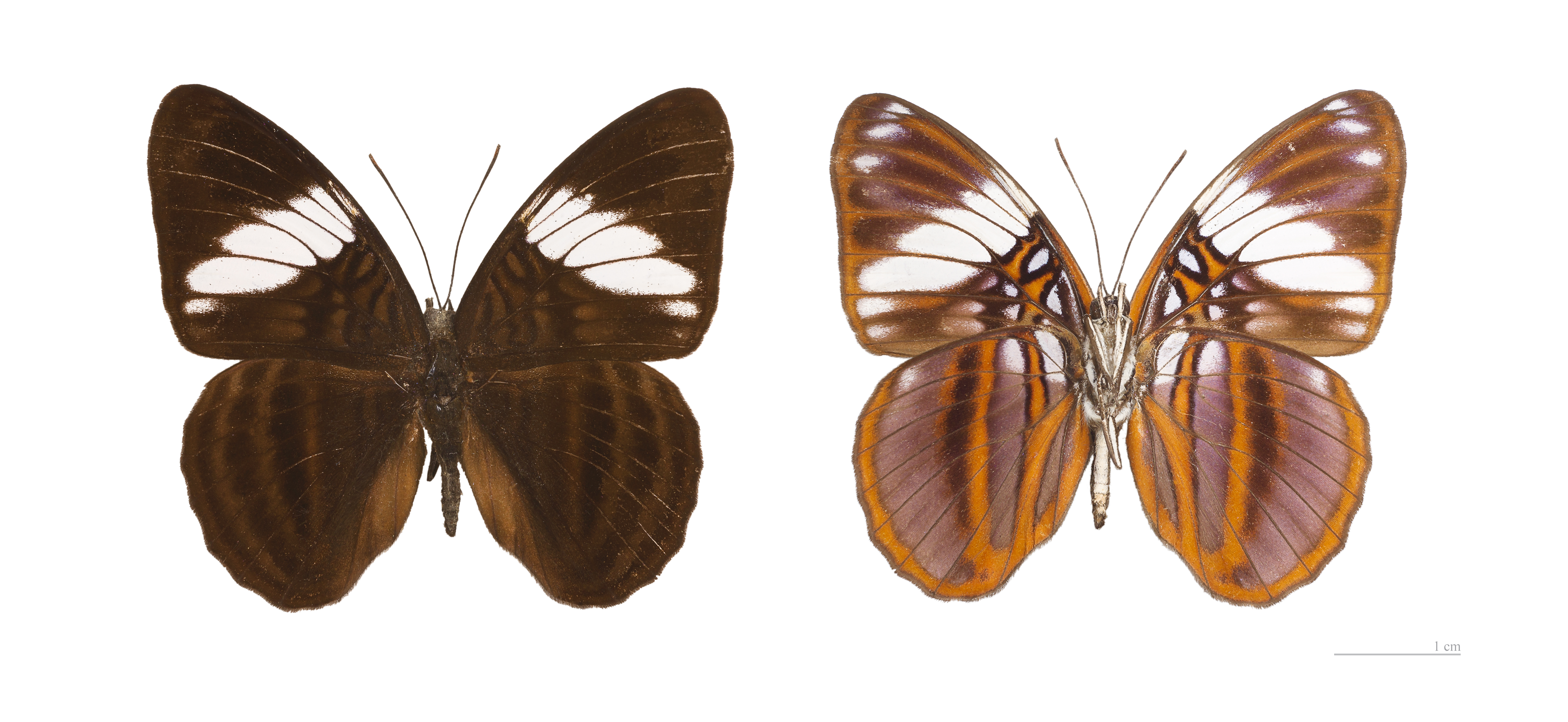
Adelpha epione - MHNT

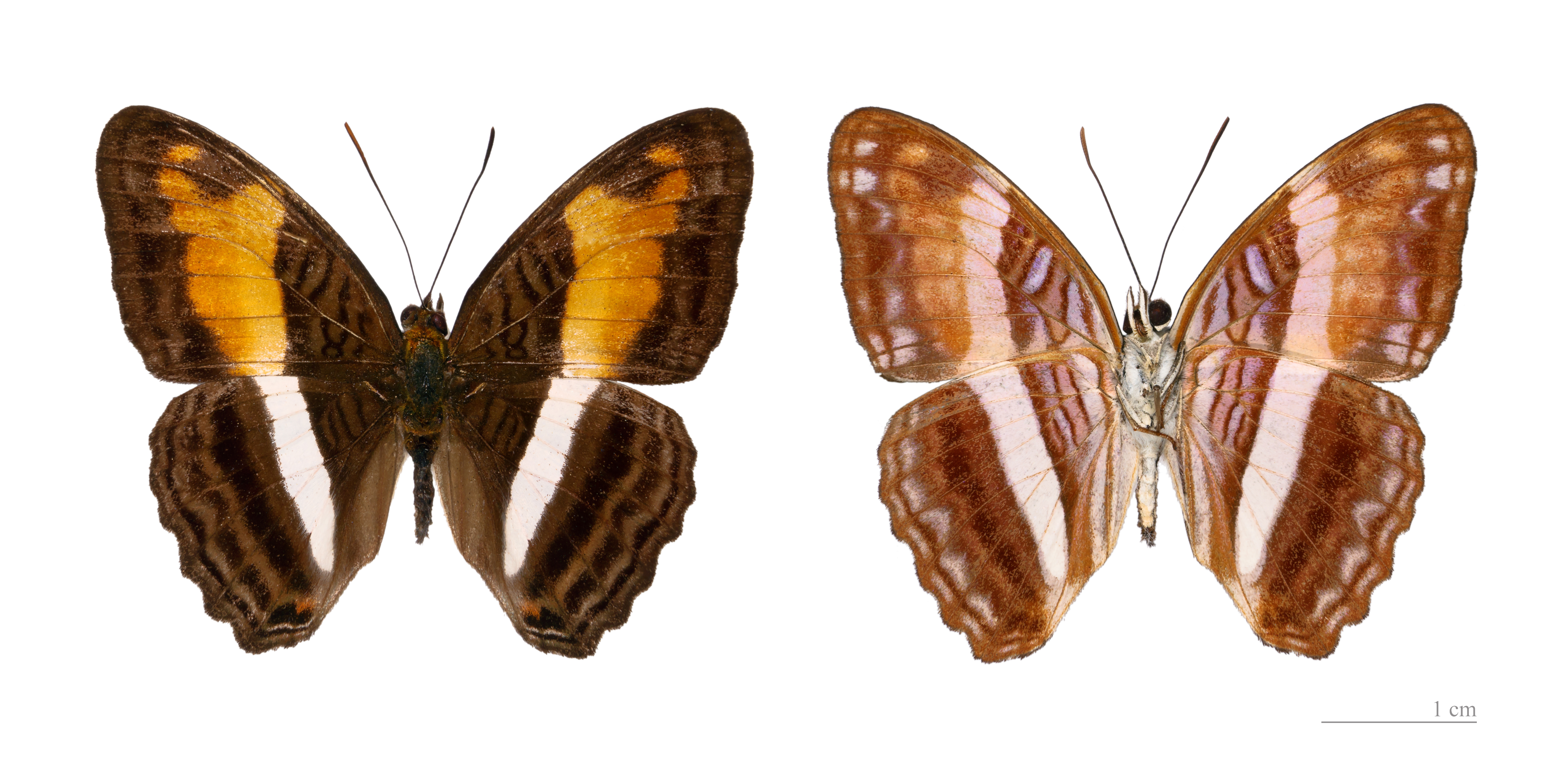
Adelpha viola - MHNT

== See also ==
- Doxocopa - A genus of butterflies whose females closely resemble Adelpha species
