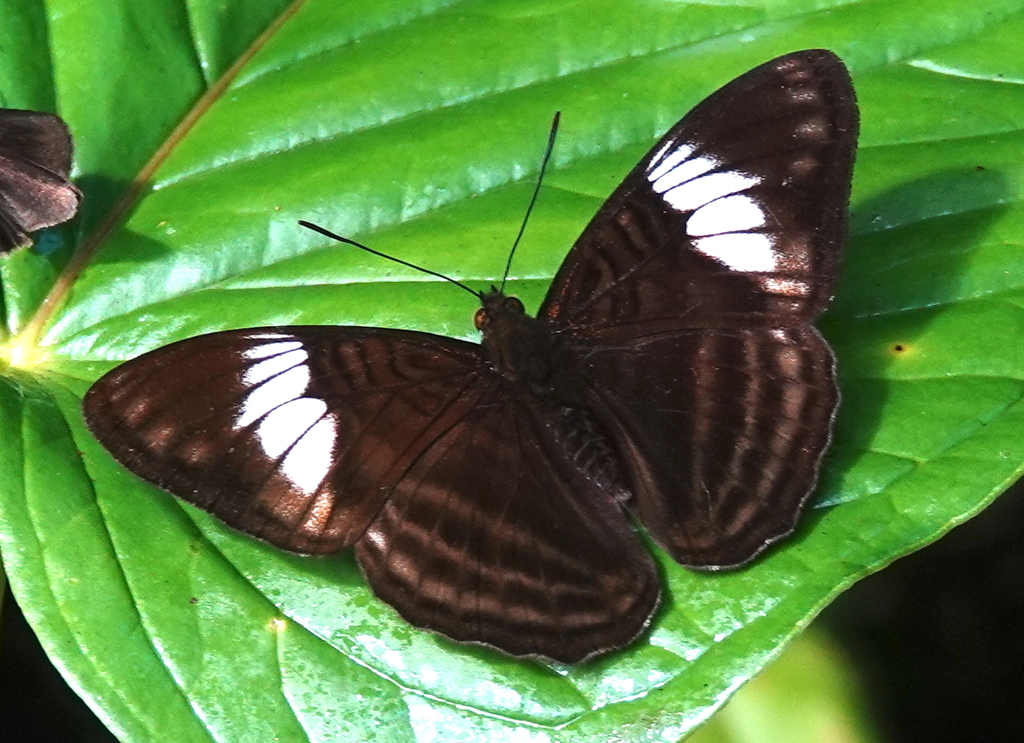

Scientific classification
- Kingdom: Animalia
- Phylum: Arthropoda
- Clade: Pancrustacea
- Class: Insecta
- Order: Lepidoptera
- Family: Nymphalidae
- Genus: Adelpha
- Species: A. ethelda

Binomial name
- Adelpha ethelda (Hewitson, 1867)

Synonyms
- Heterochroa ethelda Hewitson, 1867; Heterochroa zalmona Hewitson, 1871; Adelpha sophax Godman & Salvin, 1878; Adelpha eponina volupis Fruhstorfer, 1915

= Adelpha ethelda =

Species of butterfly

Adelpha ethelda, the Ethelda sister, is a butterfly of the family Nymphalidae. It was described by William Chapman Hewitson in 1867. It is found from Mexico to Ecuador. The habitat consists of pre-montane rainforests and cloud forests at altitudes ranging from 400 to 2,000 meters.

The wingspan is 34–37 mm. Adult males have been recorded imbibing mineralised moisture from damp soil, boulders, sandy river beaches or from aphid secretions on foliage.

Larvae have been recorded feeding on Sabicea aspera.

== Subspecies ==
- A. e. ethelda (Ecuador)
- A. e. eponina Staudinger, 1886 (Colombia)
- A. e. galbao Brévignon, 1995 (French Guiana)
- A. e. sophax Godman & Salvin, 1878 (Costa Rica, Panama)
- A. e. zalmona (Hewitson, 1871) (Costa Rica, Panama, Colombia)
