= Adelpha pollina =

Scientific classification
- Domain: Eukaryota
- Kingdom: Animalia
- Phylum: Arthropoda
- Class: Insecta
- Order: Lepidoptera
- Family: Nymphalidae
- Genus: Adelpha
- Species: A. pollina

Binomial name
- Adelpha pollina Fruhstorfer, 1915

Synonyms
- Adelpha erotia erotia f. uta Fruhstorfer, 1915

Species of butterfly

Adelpha pollina is a butterfly of the family Nymphalidae. It was described by Hans Fruhstorfer in 1915. It is found from Honduras to Panama, French Guiana and Bolivia.

The wingspan is about 45 mm.
