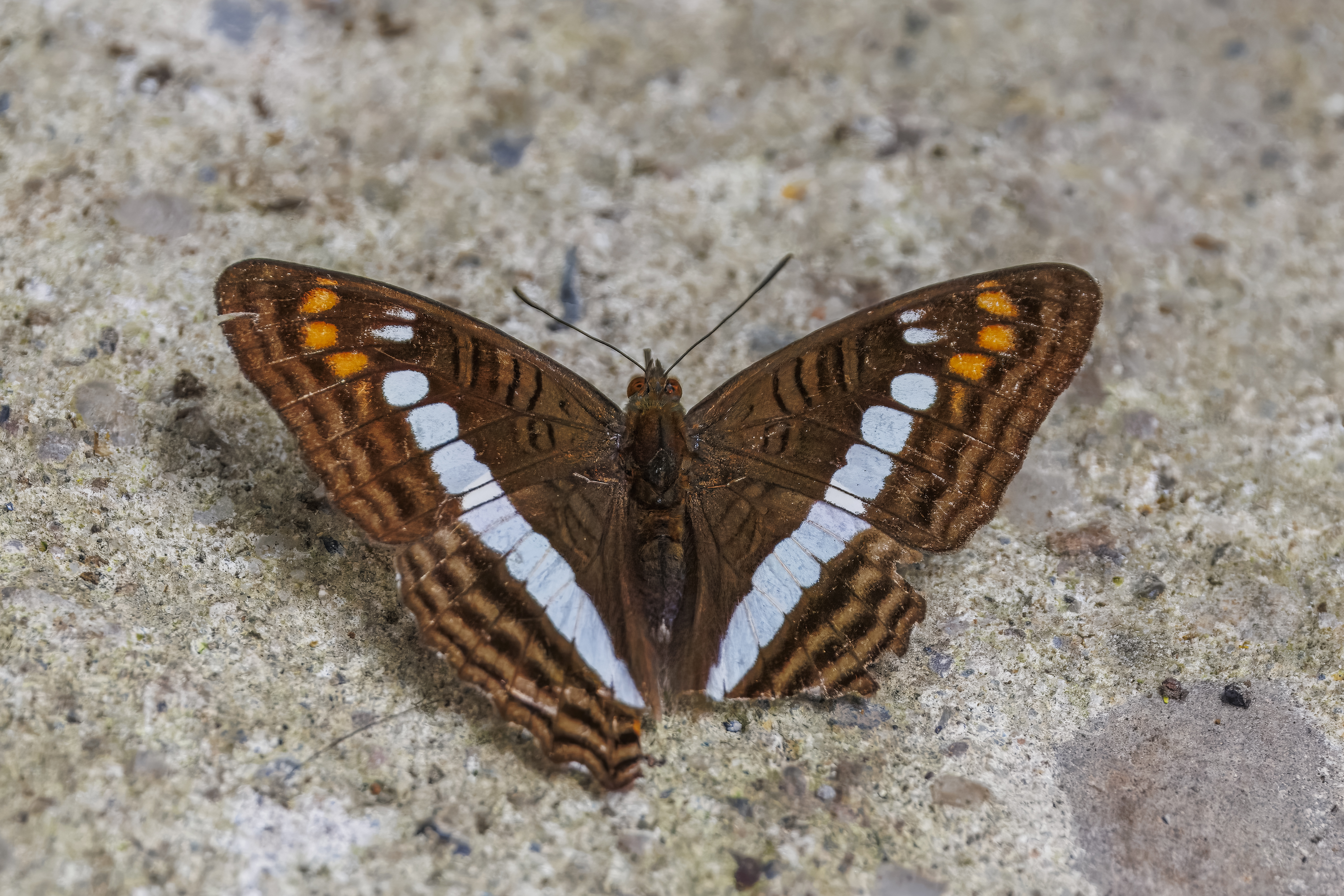
- A. a. negra, in Ecuador
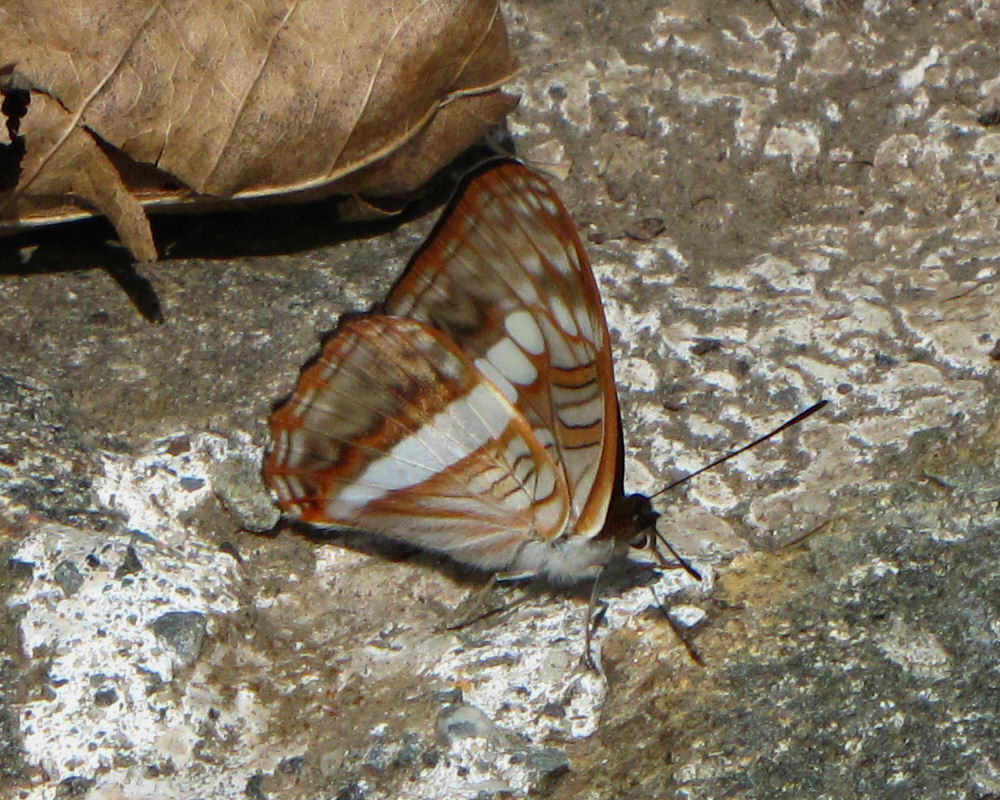
- in Colombia

Scientific classification
- Domain: Eukaryota
- Kingdom: Animalia
- Phylum: Arthropoda
- Class: Insecta
- Order: Lepidoptera
- Family: Nymphalidae
- Genus: Adelpha
- Species: A. alala

Binomial name
- Adelpha alala (Hewitson, 1847)

Synonyms
- Heterochroa alala Hewitson, 1847; Heterochroa alala var. negra C. & R. Felder, 1862; Adelpha ehrhardi Neuburger, 1907; Adelpha alala cora Fruhstorfer, 1907; Adelpha alala albifida Fruhstorfer, 1907; Adelpha alala fillo Fruhstorfer, 1907; Adelpha negrina Fruhstorfer, 1913; Adelpha alala completa f. praecaria Fruhstorfer, 1915; Adelpha alala privigna Fruhstorfer, 1915; Adelpha alala alala f. titia Fruhstorfer, 1915

= Adelpha alala =

Alala sister

Species of butterfly

Adelpha alala, the Alala sister, is a species of butterfly of the family Nymphalidae. It is found in South America.

== Subspecies ==
Listed alphabetically:

- A. a. alala
- A. a. completa Fruhstorfer, 1907
- A. a. negra (C. & R. Felder, 1862)
- A. a. titia Fruhstorfer, 1915
