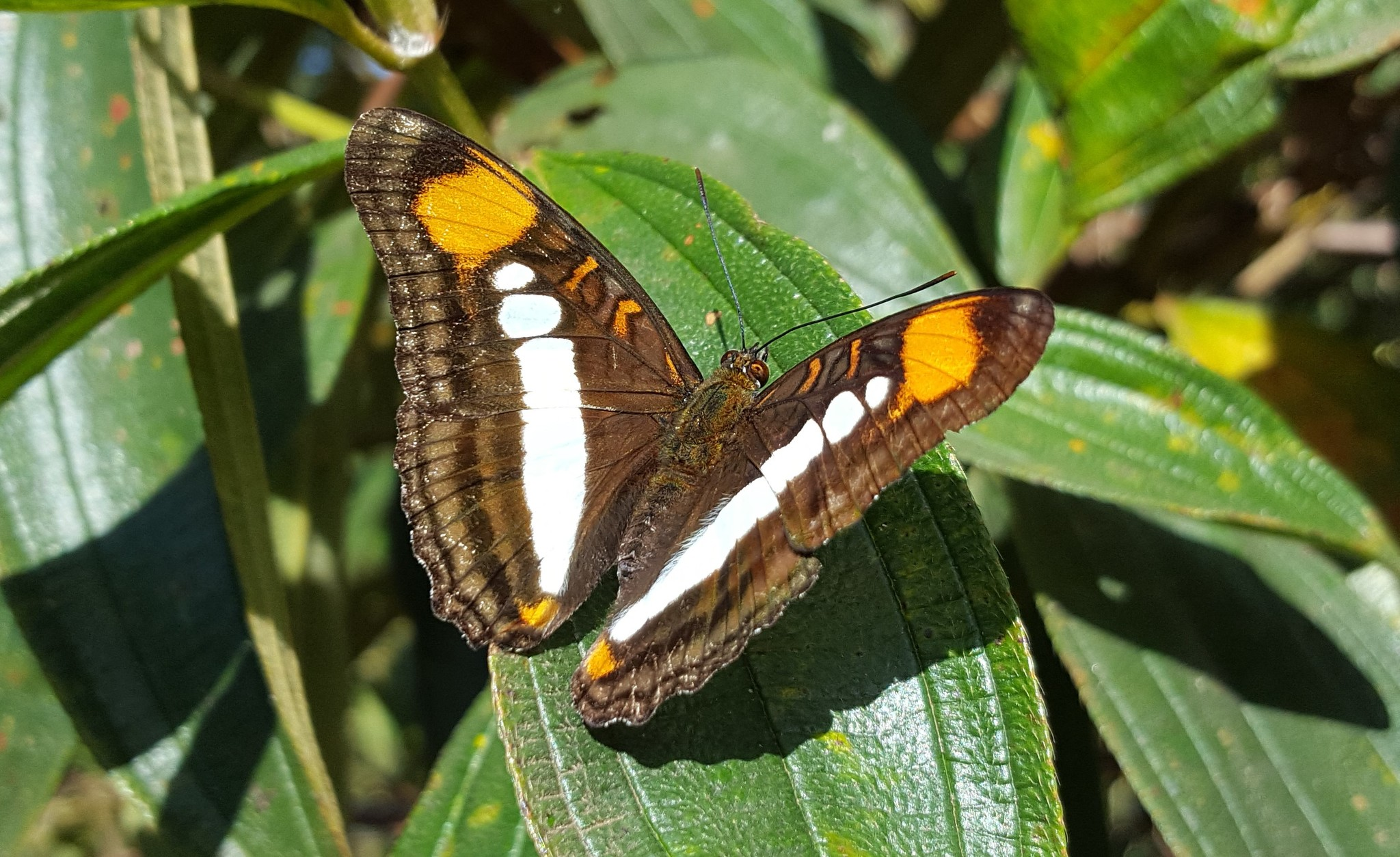
- A. serpa observed in Brazil in 2018

Scientific classification
- Kingdom: Animalia
- Phylum: Arthropoda
- Clade: Pancrustacea
- Class: Insecta
- Order: Lepidoptera
- Family: Nymphalidae
- Genus: Adelpha
- Species: A. serpa

Binomial name
- Adelpha serpa (Boisduval, [1836])

Synonyms
- Heterochroa serpa Boisduval, [1836]; Adelpha damon Fruhstorfer, 1913; Adelpha serpa f. ornamenta Fruhstorfer, 1915; Heterochroa celerio Bates, 1864; Adelpha phintias Fruhstorfer, 1913; Adelpha diademeta Fruhstorfer, 1913; Adelpha serpa f. timehri Hall, 1938; Adelpha celerio florea Brévignon, 1995

= Adelpha serpa =

Celerio sister

Species of butterfly

Adelpha serpa, the celerio sister, is a species of butterfly in the family Nymphalidae. It was described by Jean Baptiste Boisduval in 1836. It is found from Mexico to Brazil. The habitat consists of rainforests and cloudforests at elevations ranging from 300 to 2,000 meters.

The butterfly is 50–55 mm.

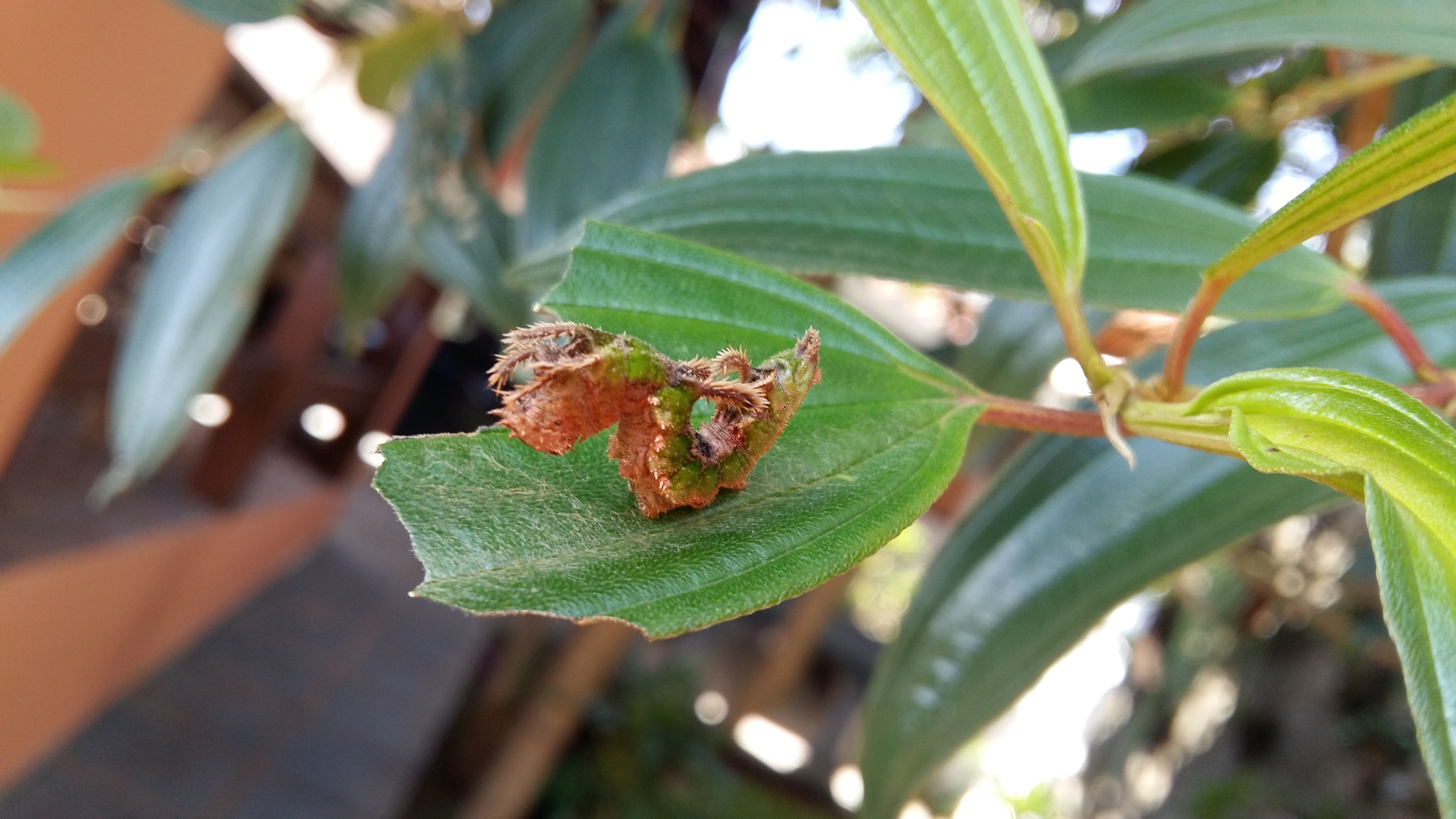
Larva of Adelpha serpa.

Larvae have been recorded feeding on Miconia multispicata, Conostegia subcrustulata, Sabicea species and Warszewiczia coccinea.

== Subspecies ==
- A. s. serpa (south-eastern Brazil to Paraguay, north-eastern Argentina)
- A. s. celerio (Bates, 1864) (Guatemala, Mexico to north-western Venezuela)
- A. s. diadochus Fruhstorfer, 1915 (Peru, Guyana, French Guiana, Brazil: Pará)
- A. s. duiliae Fruhstorfer, 1913 (western Ecuador)
