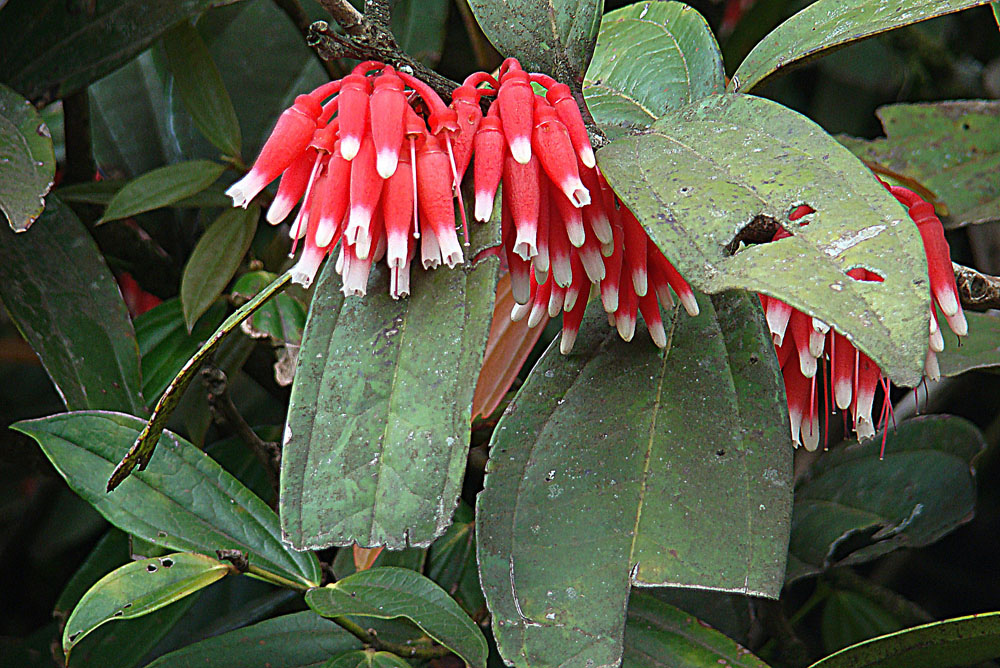
- Satyria warszewiczii

Scientific classification
- Kingdom: Plantae
- Clade: Embryophytes
- Clade: Tracheophytes
- Clade: Angiosperms
- Clade: Eudicots
- Clade: Asterids
- Order: Ericales
- Family: Ericaceae
- Subfamily: Vaccinioideae
- Tribe: Vaccinieae
- Genus: Satyria; Klotzsch

Type species
- Satyria warszewiczii

Species
- See text.

Synonyms
- Riedelia Meisn.

= Satyria =

Genus of flowering plants

Satyria is a genus of flowering plants in the blueberry tribe Vaccinieae, family Ericaceae, native to southern Mexico, Central America, and northern South America. It is closely related to Cavendishia.

== Species ==
As of September 2020, accepted species included:

Image	Scientific name	Distribution
	Satyria allenii A.C.Sm.	Costa Rica to Panama
	Satyria arborea A.C.Sm.	Colombia (Antioquia)
	Satyria boliviana Luteyn	W. & central Bolivia
	Satyria bracteolosa A.C.Sm.	W. Colombia
	Satyria breviflora Hoerold	Colombia (Antioquia, Boyacá, Caldas, Cauca, Cundinamarca, Quindío, Tolima)
	Satyria carnosiflora Lanj.	Guyana, Suriname, Venezuela
	Satyria cerander (Dunal) A.C.Sm.	North Brazil, French Guiana, Suriname
	Satyria dolichantha A.C.Sm.	Colombia
	Satyria grandifolia Hoerold	Colombia to Ecuador
	Satyria latifolia A.C.Sm.	Colombia
	Satyria leptantha A.C.Sm.	W. Colombia
	Satyria leucostoma Sleumer	Ecuador, Peru
	Satyria meiantha Donn.Sm.	Belize, Costa Rica, Guatemala, Honduras, Mexico (Veracruz, Chiapas), Nicaragua
	Satyria minutiflora A.C.Sm.	W. Colombia
	Satyria neglecta A.C.Sm.	W. Bolivia
	Satyria nitida A.C.Sm.	Venezuela
	Satyria orquidiensis Pedraza	Colombia
	Satyria panurensis (Benth. ex Meisn.) Hook.f. ex Nied.	North Brazil, Colombia, Costa Rica, Ecuador, French Guiana, Guatemala, Guyana, Honduras, the Gulf of Mexico, Mexico, Nicaragua, Panama, Peru, Venezuela
	Satyria pilosa A.C.Sm.	Colombia
	Satyria polyantha A.C.Sm.	Peru
	Satyria pterocalyx Pedraza	Colombia
	Satyria toroi A.C.Sm.	Colombia
	Satyria vargasii A.C.Sm.	Peru
	Satyria ventricosa Luteyn	Panama
	Satyria warszewiczii Klotzsch	Belize, Costa Rica, Guatemala, Honduras, Mexico, Nicaragua, Panama
