= List of butterflies of French Guiana =

Location of French Guiana

This is a list of butterflies of French Guiana. About 850 species are known from French Guiana.

== Papilionidae ==
=== Papilioninae ===
- Battus belus (Cramer, [1777])
- Battus lycidas (Cramer, [1777])
- Battus polydamas (Linnaeus, 1758)
- Eurytides callias (Rothschild & Jordan, 1906)
- Eurytides dolicaon (Cramer, [1775])
- Mimoides ariarathes (Esper, 1788)
- Mimoides pausanias (Hewitson, 1852)
- Papilio androgeus Cramer, [1775]
- Papilio anchisiades Esper, 1788
- Papilio chiansiades Westwood, 1872
- Papilio garleppi Staudinger, 1892
- Papilio menatius (Hübner, [1819])
- Papilio neyi Niepelt, 1909
- Papilio thoas Linnaeus, 1771
- Papilio torquatus Cramer, [1777]
- Parides aeneas (Linnaeus, 1758) (Parides aeneas lucasi)
- Parides anchises (Linnaeus, 1758)
- Parides chabrias (Hewitson, 1852) (Parides chabrias ygdrasilla)
- Parides coelus (Boisduval, 1836)
- Parides echemon (Hübner, [1813]) (Parides echemon ercheteles)
- Parides lysander (Cramer, [1775])
- Parides mithras (Grose-Smith, 1902)
- Parides neophilus (Geyer, 1837)
- Parides panthonus (Cramer, [1780]) (Parides panthonus barbotini)
- Parides phosphorus (Bates, 1861)
- Parides sesostris (Cramer, [1779])
- Parides vertumnus (Cramer, [1779])
- Protesilaus molops (Rothschild & Jordan, 1906)
- Protesilaus protesilaus (Linnaeus, 1758)

== Riodinidae ==
- Adelotypa penthea (Cramer, [1777])
- Adelotypa wia Brévignon & Gallard, 1992
- Alesa amesis (Cramer, 1777)
- Alesa rothschildi (Seitz, [1917])
- Alesa telephae (Boisduval, 1836)
- Amarynthis meneria (Cramer, [1776])
- Ancyluris aristodorus (Morisse, 1838)
- Ancyluris aulestes (Cramer, 1777)
- Ancyluris meliboeus (Fabricius, 1777)
- Ancyluris tedea (Cramer, 1777)
- Anteros aurigans Gallard & Brévignon, 1989
- Archaeonympha drepana (Bates, 1868)
- Archaeonympha urichi (Vane-Wright, 1994)
- Argyrogrammana alstonii (Smart, 1979)
- Argyrogrammana chicomendesi Gallard, 1995
- Argyrogrammana denisi Gallard, 1995
- Argyrogrammana glaucopis (Bates, 1868)
- Argyrogrammana johannismarci Brévignon, 1995
- Argyrogrammana nurtia (Stichel, 1911)
- Argyrogrammana placibilis (Stichel, 1910)
- Argyrogrammana physis (Stichel, 1911)
- Argyrogrammana praestigiosa (Stichel, 1929)
- Argyrogrammana occidentalis (Godman & Salvin, [1886])
- Argyrogrammana rameli (Stichle, 1930)
- Argyrogrammana sebastiani Brévignon, 1995
- Argyrogrammana stilbe (Godart, [1824])
- Argyrogrammana sublimis Brévignon & Gallard, 1995
- Argyrogrammana talboti Brévignon & Gallard, 1998
- Argyrogrammana trochilia (Westwood, 1851)
- Argyrogrammana venilia (Bates, 1868)
- Aricoris zachaeus (Fabricius, 1798)
- Baeotis barce Hewitson, 1875
- Baeotis capreolus Stichel, 1910
- Baeotis euprepes (Bates, 1868)
- Baeotis hisbon (Cramer, [1775])
- Baeotis prima (Bates, 1868)
- Callistium cleadas (Hewitson, [1866])
- Calospila antonii Brévignon, 1995
- Calospila apotheta (Bates, 1868)
- Calospila emylius (Cramer, 1775)
- Calospila fannia (Godman, 1903)
- Calospila gallardi Brévignon, 1995
- Calospila gyges (Stichel, 1911)
- Calospila maeonoides (Godman, 1903)
- Calospila rhodope (Hewitson, 1853)
- Calospila satyroides (Lathy, 1932)
- Calospila thara (Hewitson, [1858])
- Calospila zeanger (Stoll, [1790])
- Calydna cabira Hewitson, 1854
- Calydna caieta Hewitson, 1854
- Calydna stolata Brévignon, 1998
- Calydna thersander (Stoll, [1780])
- Calydna venusta Godman & Salvin, [1886]
- Chalodeta chaonitis (Hewitson, [1866])
- Chalodeta chitinosa Hall, 2002
- Chamaelimnas briola Bates, 1868
- Chorinea amazon (Saunders, 1859)
- Chorinea batesii (Saunders, 1859)
- Chorinea octauius (Fabricius, 1787)
- Colaciticus johnstoni (Dannatt, 1904)
- Comphotis irroratum (Godman, 1903)
- Cremna actoris (Cramer, [1776])
- Cremna alector (Geyer, 1837)
- Dachetola pione (Bates, 1868)
- Detritivora cleonus (Stoll, [1782])
- Detritivora gallardi (Hall & Harvey, 2001)
- Dysmathia costalis Bates, 1868
- Dysmathia portia Bates, [1868]
- Emesis lucinda (Cramer, [1775])
- Esthemopsis crystallina Brévignon & Gallard, 1992
- Eurybia cyclopia Stichel, 1910
- Eurybia dardus (Fabricius, 1787)
- Eurybia juturna C. & R. Felder, 1865
- Euselasia arbas (Stoll, 1781)
- Euselasia bilineata Lathy, 1926
- Euselasia cafusa (Bates, 1868)
- Euselasia cuprea Lathy, 1926
- Euselasia euboea (Hewitson, [1853])
- Euselasia euodias (Hewitson, 1856)
- Euselasia euoras (Hewitson, [1855])
- Euselasia euryone (Hewitson, 1856)
- Euselasia eustola Stichel, 1919
- Euselasia eutychus (Hewitson, 1856)
- Euselasia fayneli Gallard, 2006
- Euselasia gelanor (Stoll, 1780)
- Euselasia ignitus Stichel, 1924
- Euselasia inini Brévignon, 1996
- Euselasia kartopus Stichel, 1919
- Euselasia lisias (Cramer, [1777])
- Euselasia manoa Brévignon, 1996
- Euselasia midas (Fabricius, 1775)
- Euselasia opalescens (Hewitson, [1855])
- Euselasia orfita (Cramer, 1777)
- Euselasia phedica (Boisduval, [1836])
- Euselasia phelina (Druce, 1878)
- Euselasia praecipua Stichel, 1924
- Euselasia rubrocilia Lathy, 1926
- Euselasia saulina Brévignon, 1996
- Euselasia scotinosa Stichel, 1930
- Euselasia teleclus (Stoll, 1787)
- Euselasia urites (Hewitson, [1853])
- Euselasia uzita (Hewitson, [1853])
- Euselasia venezolana Seitz, 1913
- Euselasia violetta (Bates, 1868)
- Euselasia waponaka Brévignon, 1996
- Euselasia zena (Hewitson, 1860)
- Helicopis cupido (Linnaeus, 1758)
- Helicopis endymiaena (Hübner, [1819])
- Hermathena candidata Hewitson, 1874
- Hyphilaria anthias (Hewitson, 1874)
- Hyphilaria nicia Hübner, [1819]
- Hyphilaria parthenis (Westwood, 1851)
- Ithomeis aurantiaca Bates, 1862
- Ithomiola floralis C. & R. Felder, [1865]
- Juditha azan (Westwood, [1851])
- Juditha dorilis (Bates, 1866)
- Juditha odites (Cramer, [1775])
- Lasaia agesilas (Latreille, 1809)
- Lasaia lalannei Gallard, 2008
- Lasaia oileus Godman, 1903
- Lemonias egaensis (Butler, 1867)
- Lemonias zygia Hübner, [1807]
- Leucochimona icare (Hübner, [1819])
- Leucochimona lagora (Herrich-Schäffer, [1853])
- Livendula aminias (Hewitson, 1863)
- Livendula balista (Hewitson, 1863)
- Livendula jasonhalli (Brévignon & Gallard, 1999)
- Livendula leucocyana (Geyer, 1837)
- Melanis aegates (Hewitson, 1874)
- Melanis electron (Fabricius, 1793)
- Menander coruscans (Butler, 1867)
- Menander hebrus (Cramer, [1775])
- Menander menander (Stoll, [1780])
- Menander thalassicus Brévignon & Gallard, 1992
- Mesene bomilcar (Stoll, 1790)
- Mesene epaphus (Stoll, 1780)
- Mesene monostigma (Erichson, [1849])
- Mesene nepticula Möschler, 1877
- Mesene patawa Brévignon, 1995
- Mesene phareus (Cramer, [1777])
- Mesene silaris Godman & Salvin, 1878
- Mesophthalma idotea Westwood, [1851]
- Mesosemia ackeryi Brévignon, 1997
- Mesosemia antaerice Hewitson, 1859
- Mesosemia ephyne (Cramer, 1776)
- Mesosemia epidius Hewitson, 1859
- Mesosemia esmeralda Gallard & Brévignon, 1989
- Mesosemia eumene (Cramer, 1776)
- Mesosemia inconspicua Lathy, 1932
- Mesosemia melaene Hewitson, 1859
- Mesosemia menoetes Hewitson, 1859
- Mesosemia metope Hewitson, 1859
- Mesosemia minutula Gallard, 1996
- Mesosemia naiadella Stichel, 1909
- Mesosemia nympharena Stichel, 1909
- Mesosemia orbona Godman, 1903
- Mesosemia sifia (Boisduval, 1836)
- Mesosemia teulem Brévignon, 1995
- Metacharis lucius (Fabricius, 1793)
- Monethe albertus C. & R. Felder, 1862
- Mycastor nealces (Hewitson, 1871)
- Napaea beltiana (Bates, 1867)
- Napaea eucharila (Bates, 1867)
- Napaea gynaecomorpha Hall, Harvey & Gallard, 2005
- Napaea nepos (Fabricius, 1793)
- Napaea orpheus (Westwood, 1851)
- Napaea sylva (Möschler, 1877)
- Notheme erota (Cramer, [1780])
- Nymphidium acherois (Boisduval, 1836)
- Nymphidium baeotia Hewitson, [1853]
- Nymphidium cachrus (Fabricius, 1787)
- Nymphidium callaghani Brévignon, 1999
- Nymphidium caricae (Linnaeus, 1758)
- Nymphidium colleti Gallard, 2008
- Nymphidium guyanensis Gallard & Brévignon, 1989
- Nymphidium hermieri Gallard, 2008
- Nymphidium lisimon (Stoll, 1790)
- Nymphidium manicorensis Callaghan, 1985
- Nymphidium mantus (Cramer, 1775)
- Nymphidium menalcus (Stoll, 1782)
- Pachythone lateritia Bates, 1868
- Panara phereclus (Linnaeus, 1758)
- Panaropsis semiota (Bates, 1868)
- Panaropsis thyatira (Hewitson, [1853])
- Pandemos pasiphae (Cramer, [1775])
- Perophthalma tullius (Fabricius, 1787)
- Pheles atricolor (Butler, 1871)
- Pheles heliconides Herrich-Schäffer, [1858]
- Pirascca arbuscula (Möschler, 1883)
- Pirascca interrupta (Lathy, 1932)
- Pirascca sticheli (Lathy, 1932)
- Pirascca tyriotes (Godman & Salvin, 1878)
- Riodina lysippus (Linnaeus, 1758)
- Rodinia calphurnia (Saunders, 1850)
- Roeberella flocculus Brévignon & Gallard, 1993
- Sarota acanthoides (Herrich-Schäffer, [1853])
- Sarota chrysus (Stoll, [1782])
- Sarota gamelia Godman & Salvin, [1886]
- Sarota miranda Brévignon, 1998
- Setabis epitus (Cramer, [1780])
- Setabis lagus (Cramer, [1777])
- Semomesia alyattes Zikán, 1952
- Semomesia capanea (Cramer, 1779)
- Semomesia cecilae Gallard, 1997
- Semomesia nesti (Hewitson, 1858)
- Stalachtis calliope (Linnaeus, 1758)
- Stalachtis euterpe (Linnaeus, 1758)
- Stalachtis phaedusa (Hübner, [1813])
- Symmachia accusatrix Westwood, 1851
- Symmachia basilissa (Bates, 1868)
- Symmachia calligrapha Hewitson, 1867
- Symmachia calliste Hewitson, 1867
- Symmachia emeralda Hall & Harvey, 2002
- Symmachia estellina Gallard, 2008
- Symmachia falcistriga Stichel, 1910
- Symmachia hippea Herrich-Schäffer, [1853]
- Symmachia juratrix Westwood, 1851
- Symmachia leena Hewitson, 1870
- Symmachia leopardinum (C. & R. Felder, [1865])
- Symmachia multesima Stichel, 1910
- Symmachia miron Grose-Smith, 1898
- Symmachia norina Hewitson, 1867
- Symmachia pardalis Hewitson, 1867
- Symmachia poirieri, Gallard, 2009
- Symmachia probetor (Stoll, [1782])
- Symmachia rosanti Gallard, 2008
- Symmachia stigmosissima Stichel, 1910
- Symmachia technema Stichel, 1910
- Symmachia threissa Hewitson, 1870
- Symmachia triangularis (Thieme, 1907)
- Symmachia tricolor Hewitson, 1867
- Symmachia tigrina Hewitson, 1867
- Symmachia virgatula Stichel, 1910
- Synargis abaris (Cramer, 1776)
- Synargis agle (Hewitson, [1853])
- Synargis calyce (C. & R. Felder, 1862)
- Synargis chaonia (Hewitson, [1853])
- Synargis fenestrella (Lathy, 1932)
- Synargis galena (Bates, 1868)
- Synargis orestessa Hübner, [1819]
- Synargis phliasus (Clerck, 1764)
- Synargis tytia (Cramer, [1777])
- Themone pais (Hübner, [1820])
- Theope amicitiae Hall, Gallard & Brévignon, 1998
- Theope archimedes (Fabricius, 1793)
- Theope aureonitens Bates, 1868
- Theope barea Godman & Salvin, 1878
- Theope batesi Hall, 1998
- Theope brevignoni Gallard, 1996
- Theope caroli Brevignon, 2011
- Theope christiani Hall & Willmott, 1999
- Theope christophi rorota Brevignon, 2011
- Theope discus Bates, 1868
- Theope ebera Brevignon, 2011
- Theope ernestinae Brevignon, 2011
- Theope eudocia Westwood, 1851
- Theope eurygonina Bates, 1868
- Theope excelsa Bates, 1868
- Theope fayneli Gallard, 2002
- Theope fernandezi Brevignon, 2011
- Theope foliolum Brevignon, 2011
- Theope foliorum Bates, 1868
- Theope fracisi Brevignon, 2010
- Theope galionicus Gallard & Brévignon, 1989
- Theope guillaumei Gallard, 1996
- Theope janus Bates, 1867
- Theope johannispetreus Brevignon, 2010
- Theope lampropteryx Bates, 1868
- Theope leucanthe Bates, 1868
- Theope lichyi Brevignon, 2011
- Theope lycaenina Bates, 1868
- Theope martinae Brevignon, 2011
- Theope minialba Gallard, 2006
- Theope mundula Stichel, 1926
- Theope nobilis Bates, 1868
- Theope nycteis (Westwood, 1851)
- Theope orphana (Stichel, 1911)
- Theope palambala Gallard, 2009
- Theope pedias Herrich-Schäffer, [1853]
- Theope phaeo Prittwiz, 1865
- Theope philotes (Westwood, 1851)
- Theope pieridoides C. & R. Felder, 1865
- Theope rochambellus Brevignon, 2010
- Theope saphir Brevignon, 2009
- Theope sericea Bates, 1868
- Theope sobrina Bates, 1868
- Theope sticheli Hall, 1998
- Theope terambus (Godart, [1824])
- Theope tetrastigmoides Hall, 2008
- Theope thootes Hewitson, 1860
- Theope virgilius (Fabricius, 1793)
- Theope wallacei Hall, 1998
- Theope zafaran Brevignon, 2011
- Thisbe molela (Hewitson, 1865)
- Xenandra helius (Cramer, 1779)
- Xynias lithosina (Bates, 1868)
- Zelotaea alba Gallard & Brévignon, 1989
- Zelotaea suffusca Brévignon & Gallard, 1993

== Pieridae ==
=== Coliadinae ===
- Anteos menippe (Hübner, [1818])
- Aphrissa fluminensis (d'Almeida, 1921)
- Eurema agave (Cramer, 1775)
- Eurema daira (Godart, 1819)
- Eurema elathea (Cramer, [1777])
- Eurema mexicana (Boisduval, 1836)
- Eurema venusta (Boisduval, 1836)
- Phoebis neocypris (Hübner, [1823])
- Phoebis philea (Linnaeus, 1763)
- Phoebis sennae (Linnaeus, 1758)

=== Dismorphiinae ===
- Dismorphia amphione (Cramer, [1779])
- Dismorphia crisia (Drury, [1782])
- Dismorphia theucharila (Doubleday, 1848)
- Dismorphia zathoe (Hewitson, [1858])
- Enantia aloikea Brévignon, 1993
- Moschoneura pinthous (Linnaeus, 1758)
- Patia orise (Boisduval, [1836])

=== Pierinae ===
- Appias drusilla (Cramer, [1777])
- Archonias brassolis (Fabricius, 1777)
- Ascia monuste (Linnaeus, 1764)
- Hesperocharis nera (Hewitson, 1852)
- Itaballia demophile (Linnaeus, 1758)
- Perrhybris pamela (Stoll, [1780])

== Lycaenidae ==
=== Polyommatinae ===
- Leptotes cassius (Cramer, [1775])
- Leptotes marina (Reakirt, 1868)

=== Theclinae ===
- Arawacus aetolus Sultzer, 1776
- Arcas imperialis (Cramer, [1775])
- Atlides inachus (Cramer, [1775])
- Arumecla aruma (Hewitson, 1877)
- Bistonina erema (Hewitson, 1867)
- Brangas getus (Fabricius, 1787)
- Calycopis cerata (Hewitson, 1877)
- Calycopis caesaries (Druce, 1907)
- Calycopis calus (Godart, [1824])
- Calycopis matho (Godman & Salvin, [1887])
- Calycopis puppius (Godman & Salvin, [1887])
- Calycopis xeneta (Hewitson, 1877)
- Celmia anastomosis (Draudt, [1918])
- Celmia color (Druce, 1907)
- Chlorostrymon simaethis (Drury, [1773])
- Contrafacia imma (Prittwitz, 1865)
- Enos falerina (Hewitson, 1867)
- Erora badeta (Hewitson, 1873)
- Evenus batesi (Hewitson, 1865)
- Evenus floralia (Druce, 1907)
- Evenus gabriela (Cramer, 1775)
- Evenus sponsa (Möschler, 1877)
- Exorbaetta metanira (Hewitson, 1867)
- Iaspis thabena (Hewitson, 1868)
- Janthecla leea Venables & Robbins, 1991
- Janthecla malvina (Hewitson, 1867)
- Janthecla sista (Hewitson, 1867)
- Kolana ergina (Hewitson, 1867)
- Kolana ligurina (Hewitson, 1874)
- Lamprospilus badaca (Hewitson, 1868)
- Lamprospilus quadramacula (Austin & Johnson, 1997)
- Laothus numen (Druce, 1907)
- Lathecla latagus (Godman & Salvin, [1887])
- Ministrymon coronta (Hewitson, 1874)
- Nicolaea besidia (Hewitson, 1868)
- Nicolaea fabulla (Hewitson, 1868)
- Oenomaus isabellae Faynel, 2006
- Ostrinotes purpuriticus (Druce, 1907)
- Ostrinotes tarena (Hewitson, 1874)
- Paiwarria telemus (Cramer, [1775])
- Panthiades aeolus (Fabricius, 1775)
- Parrhasius m-album (Boisduval & Le Conte, 1833)
- Parrhasius orgia (Hewitson, 1867)
- Porthecla forasteira Faynel & Moser, 2011
- Porthecla minyia (Hewitson, 1867)
- Strephonota acameda (Hewitson, 1867)
- Strephonota adela (Staudinger, 1888)
- Strephonota ambrax (Westwood, 1852)
- Strephonota bicolorata Faynel, 2003
- Strephonota carteia (Hewitson, 1867)
- Strephonota cyllarissus (Herbst, 1800)
- Strephonota malvania (Hewitson, 1867)
- Strephonota parvipuncta (Lathy, 1926)
- Strephonota porphyritis (Druce, 1907)
- Strephonota sphinx (Fabricius, 1775)
- Strephonota strephon (Fabricius, 1775)
- Strephonota syedra (Hewitson, 1867)
- Strephonota tephraeus (Geyer, 1837)
- Strephonota tyriam (Druce, 1907)
- Strymon megarus (Godart, [1824])
- Symbiopsis nivepunctata (Druce, 1907)
- Theclopsis lydus (Hübner, [1819])
- Thepytus thyrea (Hewitson, 1867)
- Thereus cithonius (Godart, [1824])
- Thereus pedusa (Hewitson, 1867)
- Thereus tiasa (Hewitson, 1869)
- Theritas hemon (Cramer, [1775])
- Theritas triquetra (Hewitson, 1865)
- Theritas viresco (Druce, 1907)
- Thestius pholeus (Cramer, [1777])
- Tmolus venustus (Druce, 1907)
- Trichonis hyacinthus (Cramer, [1775])
- Trichonis immaculata Lathy, 1930

== Nymphalidae ==
=== Apaturinae ===
- Doxocopa agathina (Cramer, [1777])

=== Biblidinae ===
- Antigonis pharsalia (Hewitson, [1852])
- Asterope markii (Hewitson, 1857)
- Callicore astarte (Cramer, 1779)
- Callicore maronensis (Oberthür, 1916)
- Callicore pygas (Godart, [1824])
- Callicore texa (Hewitson, [1855])
- Catonephele acontius (Linnaeus, 1771)
- Catonephele antinoe (Godart, [1824])
- Catonephele numilia (Cramer, 1776)
- Diaethria clymena (Cramer, [1775])
- Dynamine athemon (Linnaeus, 1758)
- Dynamine laugieri (Oberthür, 1916)
- Dynamine pebana Staudinger, [1885]
- Eunica alpais (Godart, [1824])
- Eunica amelia (Cramer, 1777)
- Eunica anna (Cramer, 1780)
- Eunica eurota (Cramer, [1775])
- Eunica orphise (Cramer, [1775])
- Eunica sophonisba (Cramer, 1780)
- Eunica volumna Godart, 1824
- Hamadryas amphinome (Linnaeus, 1767)
- Hamadryas arinome (Lucas, 1853)
- Hamadryas feronia (Linnaeus, 1758)
- Mestra dorcas (Fabricius, 1775)
- Myscelia milloi Oberthür, 1916
- Nessaea batesii (C. & R. Felder, 1860)
- Panacea bleuzeni Plantrou & Attal, 1986
- Paulogramma pyracmon (Godart, [1824])
- Pyrrhogyra amphiro Bates, 1865
- Pyrrhogyra edocla (Doubleday, 1848)
- Pyrrhogyra neaerea (Linnaeus, 1758)
- Pyrrhogyra otolais Bates, 1864
- Pyrrhogyra stratonicus Fruhstorfer, 1908
- Temenis laothoe (Cramer, [1777])
- Vila emilia (Cramer, [1779])

=== Charaxinae ===
- Agrias amydon Hewitson, 1854
- Agrias claudina (Godart, [1824])
- Agrias narcissus Staudinger, [1885]
- Archaeoprepona amphimachus (Fabricius, 1775)
- Archaeoprepona demophon (Linnaeus, 1758)
- Fountainea ryphea (Cramer, [1775])
- Hypna clytemnestra (Cramer, 1777)
- Memphis acidalia (Hübner, [1819])
- Memphis basilia (Stoll, [1780])
- Memphis glauce (C. & R. Felder, 1862)
- Memphis grandis (Druce, 1877)
- Memphis laertes (Cramer, [1775])
- Memphis leonida (Stoll, [1782])
- Memphis moruus (Fabricius, 1775)
- Memphis oenomais (Boisduval, 1870)
- Memphis phantes (Hopffer, 1874)
- Memphis philumena (Doubleday, [1849])
- Memphis pithyusa (R. Felder, 1869)
- Memphis polycarmes (Fabricius, 1775)
- Memphis xenocles (Westwood, 1850)
- Polygrapha xenocrates (Westwood, 1850)
- Prepona dexamenus Hopffer, 1874
- Prepona eugenes Bates, 1865
- Prepona gnorima Bates, 1865
- Prepona laertes (Hübner, [1811])
- Prepona lygia Fruhstorfer, 1904
- Prepona neoterpe Honrath, 1844
- Prepona pheridamas (Cramer, [1777])
- Prepona philipponi Le Moult, 1932
- Prepona pseudomphale Le Moult, 1932
- Prepona pylene Hewitson, 1853
- Prepona werneri Hering, 1925
- Zaretis itys (Cramer, 1777)

=== Cyrestinae ===
- Marpesia orsilochus (Fabricius, 1776)

=== Danainae ===
- Aeria eurimedia (Cramer, [1777])
- Callithomia alexirrhoe Bates, 1862
- Callithomia lenea (Cramer, [1779])
- Ceratinia cayana (Salvin, 1869)
- Ceratinia neso (Hübner, [1806])
- Danaus eresimus (Cramer, [1777])
- Danaus gilippus (Cramer, [1775])
- Danaus plexippus (Linnaeus, 1758)
- Dircenna adina (Hewitson, [1855])
- Dircenna dero (Hübner, 1823)
- Episcada clausina (Hewitson, 1876)
- Forbestra equicola (Cramer, [1780])
- Godyris zavaleta (Hewitson, [1854])
- Hypoleria lavinia (Hewitson, [1855])
- Hyposcada anchiala (Hewitson, 1868)
- Hyposcada illinissa (Hewitson, 1851)
- Hyposcada zarepha (Hewitson, 1869)
- Hypothyris euclea (Godart, 1819)
- Hypothyris fluonia (Hewitson, 1854)
- Hypothyris gemella Fox, 1971
- Hypothyris leprieuri (Feisthamel, 1835)
- Hypothyris ninonia (Hübner, [1806])
- Hypothyris vallonia (Hewitson, [1853])
- Hypothyris xanthostola (Bates, 1862)
- Lycorea pasinuntia (Stoll, [1780])
- Lycorea halia (Hübner, 1816)
- Mcclungia cymo (Hübner, [1806])
- Mechanitis lysimnia (Fabricius, 1793)
- Mechanitis mazaeus Hewitson, 1860
- Mechanitis polymnia (Linnaeus, 1758)
- Melinaea lilis (Doubleday, 1847)
- Melinaea ludovica (Cramer, [1780])
- Melinaea menophilus (Hewitson, [1856])
- Melinaea mnasias (Hewitson, [1856])
- Melinaea mneme (Linnaeus, 1763)
- Melinaea satevis (Doubleday, 1847)
- Methona grandior (Forbes, 1944)
- Methona megisto C. & R. Felder, 1860
- Napeogenes inachia (Hewitson, 1855)
- Napeogenes rhezia (Geyer, [1834])
- Napeogenes sylphis (Guérin-Méneville, [1844])
- Oleria antaxis (Haensch, 1909)
- Oleria astrea (Cramer, [1775])
- Oleria flora (Cramer, 1779)
- Oleria ilerdina (Hewitson, [1858])
- Pseudoscada florula (Hewitson, [1855])
- Pteronymia primula (Bates, 1862)
- Scada reckia (Hübner, [1808])
- Sais rosalia (Cramer, [1779])
- Thyridia psidii (Linnaeus, 1758)
- Tithorea harmonia (Cramer, [1777])

=== Heliconiinae ===
- Actinote thalia (Linnaeus, 1758)
- Agraulis vanillae (Boisduval & Le Conte, 1835)
- Dione juno (Cramer, [1779])
- Eueides aliphera Godart, 1819
- Eueides isabella Cramer, 1781
- Eueides lampeto Bates, 1862
- Eueides libitina Staudinger, 1885
- Eueides lybia Fabricius, 1775
- Eueides tales (Cramer, [1775])
- Eueides vibilia Godart, 1819
- Heliconius antiochus (Linnaeus, 1767)
- Heliconius aoede (Hübner, [1813])
- Heliconius burneyi (Hübner, [1831])
- Heliconius charithonia (Linnaeus, 1767)
- Heliconius demeter Staudinger, [1897]
- Heliconius doris (Linnaeus, 1771)
- Heliconius egeria (Cramer, 1775)
- Heliconius elevatus Nöldner, 1901
- Heliconius erato (Linnaeus, 1764)
- Heliconius ethilla Godart, 1819
- Heliconius hecale (Fabricius, 1775)
- Heliconius lalitae Brévignon, 1996
- Heliconius melpomene (Linnaeus, 1758)
- Heliconius metharme (Erichson, [1849])
- Heliconius numata (Cramer, [1780])
- Heliconius ricini (Linnaeus, 1758)
- Heliconius telesiphe Doubleday, 1874
- Heliconius wallacei Reakirt, 1866
- Heliconius xanthocles Bates, 1862
- Philaethria andrei Brevignon, 2002
- Philaethria pygmalion (Fruhstorfer, 1912)

=== Libytheinae ===
- Libytheana carinenta (Cramer, [1777])

=== Limenitidinae ===
- Adelpha boreas (Butler, [1866])
- Adelpha cocala (Cramer, [1779])
- Adelpha cytherea (Linnaeus, 1758)
- Adelpha erotia (Hewitson, 1847)
- Adelpha ethelda (Hewitson, 1867)
- Adelpha iphiclus (Linnaeus, 1758)
- Adelpha melona (Hewitson, 1847)
- Adelpha nea (Hewitson, 1847)
- Adelpha plesaure Hübner, 1823
- Adelpha pollina Fruhstorfer, 1915
- Adelpha radiata Fruhstorfer, 1915
- Adelpha serpa (Boisduval, [1836])
- Adelpha thesprotia (C. & R. Felder, [1867])

=== Morphinae ===
- Antirrhea ornata (Butler, 1870)
- Antirrhea philoctetes (Linnaeus, 1758)
- Caerois chorinaeus (Fabricius, 1775)
- Caligo euphorbus (C. Felder & R. Felder, 1862)
- Caligo eurilochus (Cramer, [1775])
- Caligo idomeneus (Linnaeus, 1758)
- Caligo teucer (Linnaeus, 1758)
- Catoblepia berecynthia (Cramer, [1777])
- Catoblepia versitincta (Stichel, 1901)
- Catoblepia xanthicles (Godman & Salvin, [1881])
- Catoblepia xanthus (Linnaeus, 1758)
- Dynastor darius (Fabricius, 1775)
- Dynastor macrosiris (Westwood, 1851)
- Morpho achilles (Linnaeus, 1758)
- Morpho adonis (Cramer, 1775), synonym of Morpho marcus
- Morpho deidamia (Hübner, [1819])
- Morpho eugenia Deyrolle, 1860
- Morpho hecuba (Linnaeus, 1771)
- Morpho helenor (Cramer, 1776)
- Morpho marcus (Schaller, 1785)
- Morpho menelaus (Linnaeus, 1758)
- Morpho rhetenor (Cramer, [1775])
- Morpho telemachus (Linnaeus, 1758)
- Opsiphanes cassiae (Linnaeus, 1758)
- Opsiphanes cassina C. & R. Felder, 1862
- Opsiphanes invirae (Hübner, [1808])
- Selenophanes cassiope (Cramer, [1775])

=== Nymphalinae ===
- Anartia amathea (Linnaeus, 1758)
- Anartia jatrophae (Linnaeus, 1763)
- Baeotus aeilus (Stoll, 1780)
- Colobura annulata Willmott, Constantino & Hall, 2001
- Colobura dirce (Linnaeus, 1758)
- Eresia clio (Linnaeus, 1758)
- Eresia erysice (Geyer, 1832)
- Eresia eunice (Hübner, [1807])
- Eresia nauplius (Linnaeus, 1758)
- Eresia perna Hewitson, [1852]
- Historis acheronta (Fabricius, 1775)
- Hypolimnas misippus (Linnaeus, 1764)
- Janatella hera (Cramer, [1779])
- Junonia evarete (Cramer, [1779])
- Junonia genoveva (Cramer, [1780])
- Ortilia liriope (Cramer, [1775])
- Siproeta stelenes (Linnaeus, 1758)
- Tegosa claudina (Eschscholtz, 1821)
- Telenassa fontus (Hall, 1928)

=== Satyrinae ===
- Amiga arnaca (Fabricius, 1776)
- Amphidecta calliomma (C. Felder & R. Felder, 1862)
- Caeruleuptychia brixius (Godart, [1824])
- Caeruleuptychia caerulea (Butler, 1869)
- Caeruleuptychia helios (Weymer, 1911)
- Caeruleuptychia penicillata (Godman, 1905)
- Caeruleuptychia twalela Brévignon, 2005
- Cepheuptychia cephus (Fabricius, 1775)
- Chloreuptychia chlorimene (Hübner, [1819])
- Chloreuptychia herseis (Godart, [1824])
- Chloreuptychia hewitsonii (Butler, 1867)
- Chloreuptychia tolumnia (Cramer, 1777)
- Cissia lesbia (Staudinger, [1886])
- Cissia maripa Brévignon, 2005
- Cissia myncea (Cramer, 1780)
- Cissia penelope (Fabricius, 1775)
- Cissia terrestris (Butler, 1867)
- Cithaerias andromeda (Fabricius, 1775)
- Erichthodes antonina (C. & R. Felder, [1867])
- Euptychia marceli Brévignon, 2005
- Euptychia mollina suzannae Brévignon, 2005
- Euptychia neildi Brévignon, 2005
- Euptychia rufocincta Weymer, 1911
- Euptychia westwoodi muli Brévignon, 2005
- Haetera piera (Linnaeus, 1758)
- Harjesia blanda (Möschler, 1877)
- Harjesia griseola (Weyner, 1910)
- Harjesia gulnare (Butler, 1870) syn Harjesia oreba
- Hermeuptychia hermes (Fabricius, 1775)
- Magneuptychia divergens (Butler, 1867)
- Magneuptychia gera (Hewitson, 1850)
- Magneuptychia harpyia (C. & R. Felder, 1867)
- Magneuptychia iris (C. & R. Felder, 1867)
- Magneuptychia lea (Cramer, [1780])
- Magneuptychia libye (Linnaeus, 1767)
- Magneuptychia modesta (Butler, 1867)
- Magneuptychia murrayae Brévignon, 2005
- Magneuptychia newtoni (A.Hall, 1939)
- Magneuptychia ocypete (Fabricius, 1776)
- Magneuptychia tricolor (Hewitson, 1850)
- Magneuptychia sp.
- Manataria hercyna (Hübner, [1821])
- Megeuptychia antonoe (Cramer, 1775)
- Pareuptychia binocula (Butler, 1869)
- Pareuptychia hervei Brévignon, 2005
- Pareuptychia hesionides deviae Brévignon, 2005
- Pareuptychia lydia (Cramer, 1777)
- Pareuptychia ocirrhoe (Fabricius, 1775)
- Paryphthimoides argulus (Godart, [1824])
- Paryphthimoides undulata (Butler, 1867)
- Pierella astyoche (Erichson, [1849])
- Pierella lamia (Sulzer, 1776)
- Pierella hyalinus (Gmelin, [1790])
- Pierella lena (Linnaeus, 1767)
- Posttaygetis penelea (Cramer, 1775)
- Pseudodebis marpessa (Hewintson, 1862)
- Pseudodebis valentina (Cramer, 1779)
- Splendeuptychia clorimena (Stoll, 1780)
- Splendeuptychia furina (Hewintson, 1862)
- Splendeuptychia itonis (Hewintson, 1862)
- Splendeuptychia purusana ( Aurivillius, 1929)
- Taygetis cleopatra C. Felder and R. Felder, 1862
- Taygetis echo (Cramer, 1775)
- Taygetis laches (Fabricius, 1793)
- Taygetis mermeria Cramer, 1776
- Taygetis oyapock Brévignon, 2007
- Taygetis rufomarginata Staudinger, 1888
- Taygetis thamyra (Cramer, 1779)
- Taygetis virgilia (Cramer, 1776)
- Taygetis zippora (Butler, 1869)
- Taygetomorpha celia (Cramer, 1779)
- Yphthimoides renata (Stoll, 1780)
- Yphthimoides eriphule (Butler, 1867)

== Hesperiidae ==
=== Hesperiinae ===
- Anatrytone barbara (Williams & Bell, 1931)
- Anatrytone sarah Burns, 1994
- Arotis bryna (Evans, 1955)
- Arotis evansi (Mielke, 1972)
- Artines aepitus (Geyer, [1832])
- Atalopedes campestris (Boisduval, 1852)
- Carystoides yenna Evans, 1955
- Carystus hocus Evans, 1955
- Copaeodes jean Evans, 1955
- Corticea lysias (Plötz, 1883)
- Cymaenes alumna (Butler, 1877)
- Cynea anthracinus (Mabille, 1877)
- Cynea cyrus (Plötz, 1882)
- Cynea diluta (Herrich-Schäffer, 1869)
- Cynea robba Evans, 1955
- Enosis iccius Evans, 1955
- Eutychide subpunctata Hayward, 1940
- Lerema ancillaris (Butler, 1877)
- Mnasilus allubita (Butler, 1877)
- Nastra guianae (Lindsey, 1925)
- Orphe vatinius Godman, [1901]
- Orthos trinka Evans, 1955
- Papias ignarus (Bell, 1932)
- Papias phaeomelas (Hübner, [1831])
- Papias phainis Godman, [1900]
- Paracarystys hypargyra (Herrich-Schäffer, 1869)
- Penicula advena (Draudt, 1923)
- Perichares butus (Möschler, 1877)
- Phanes almoda (Hewitson, 1866)
- Phemiades pohli (Bell, 1932)
- Phlebodes campo (Bell, 1947)
- Polites vibex (Geyer, [1832])
- Propertius phineus (Cramer, [1777])
- Quasimellana angra (Evans, 1955)
- Quasimellana eulogius (Plötz, 1883)
- Quasimellana pandora (Hayward, 1940)
- Saliana severus (Mabille, 1895)
- Saliana vixen Evans, 1955
- Saturnus reticulata (Plötz, 1883)
- Saturnus saturnus (Fabricius, 1787)
- Thargella caura (Plötz, 1882)
- Vettius marcus (Fabricius, 1787)
- Vettius phyllus (Cramer, [1777])
- Wallengrenia otho (Smith, 1797)

=== Pyrginae ===
- Aguna coelus (Stoll, [1781])
- Astraptes apastus (Cramer, [1777])
- Augiades crinisus (Cramer, [1780])
- Augiades epimethea (Plötz, 1883)
- Autochton bipunctatus (Gmelin, [1790])
- Autochton itylus Hübner, [1823]
- Autochton neis (Geyer, 1832)
- Bungalotis borax Evans, 1952
- Bungalotis midas (Cramer, [1775])
- Cabirus procas (Cramer, [1777])
- Camptopleura termon (Hopffer, 1874)
- Carrhenes fuscescens (Mabille, 1891)
- Celaenorrhinus shema (Hewitson, 1877)
- Charidia lucaria (Hewitson, 1868)
- Chiomara basigutta (Plötz, 1884)
- Chiomara mithrax (Möschler, 1879)
- Clito clito (Fabricius, 1787)
- Clito littera (Mabille, 1877)
- Drephalys olvina Evans, 1952
- Drephalys oriander (Hewitson, 1867)
- Drephalys talboti (Le Cerf, 1922)
- Dyscophellus euribates (Stoll, [1782])
- Dyscophellus sebaldus (Stoll, [1781])
- Ebrietas evanidus Mabille, 1898
- Ectomis cythna (Hewitson, 1878)
- Entheus gentius (Cramer, 1777)
- Entheus priassus (Linnaeus, 1758)
- Eracon clinias (Mabille, 1878)
- Heliopetes arsalte (Linnaeus, 1758)
- Heliopyrgus domicella (Erichson, 1848)
- Hyalothyrus infernalis (Möschler, 1877)
- Iliana heros (Mabille & Boullet, 1917)
- Milanion hemes (Cramer, [1777])
- Milanion leucaspis (Mabille, 1878)
- Morvina falisca (Hewitson, 1878)
- Narcosius aulina (Evans, 1952)
- Nascus broteas (Cramer, 1780)
- Nascus paulliniae (Sepp, [1842])
- Nisoniades brunneata (Williams & Bell, 1939)
- Nisoniades ephora (Herrich-Schäffer, 1870)
- Nisoniades guianae (Williams & Bell, 1939)
- Nisoniades laurentina (Williams & Bell, 1939)
- Nisoniades macarius (Herrich-Schäffer, 1870)
- Nisoniades mimas (Cramer, [1775])
- Nisoniades rubescens (Möschler, 1877)
- Oileides azines (Hewitson, 1867)
- Oileides fenestratus (Gmelin, [1790])
- Oileides vulpinus Hübner, [1825]
- Onenses kelso Evans, 1953
- Ouleus juxta (Bell, 1934)
- Pachyneuria lista Evans, 1953
- Paramimus scurra (Hübner, [1809])
- Phanus vitreus (Stoll, [1781])
- Phocides polybius (Fabricius, 1793)
- Phocides thermus (Mabille, 1883)
- Plumbago pulverea (Mabille, 1878)
- Polygonus savigny (Latreille, [1824])
- Polythrix auginus (Hewitson, 1867)
- Porphyrogenes sororcula (Mabille & Boullet, 1912)
- Proteides mercurius (Fabricius, 1787)
- Pseudodrephalys hypargus (Mabille, 1891)
- Pyrdalus corbulo (Stoll, [1781])
- Pythonides lerina (Hewitson, 1868)
- Pythonides limaea (Hewitson, 1868)
- Quadrus contubernalis (Mabille, 1883)
- Quadrus deyrollei (Mabille, 1887)
- Sostrata festiva (Erichson, [1849])
- Staphylus incisus (Mabille, 1878)
- Tarsoctenus praecia (Hewitson, [1857])
- Telemiades epicalus Hübner, [1819]
- Telemiades nicomedes (Möschler, 1879)
- Urbanus albimargo (Mabille, 1875)
- Urbanus procne (Plötz, 1880)
- Urbanus simplicius (Stoll, [1790])
- Urbanus teleus (Hübner, 1821)
- Urbanus velinus (Plötz, 1880)
- Urbanus virescens (Mabille, 1877)
- Xenophanes tryxus (Stoll, [1780])

=== Pyrrhopyginae ===
- Aspitha aspitha (Hewitson, [1866])
- Croniades pieria (Hewitson, [1857])
- Jemadia fallax (Mabille, 1878)
- Jemadia gnetus (Fabricius, 1781)
- Jemadia hewitsonii (Mabille, 1878)
- Mysarbia sejanus Hopffer, 1874
- Myscelus assaricus (Cramer, [1779])
- Myscelus pegasus Mabille, 1903
- Myscelus santhilarius (Latreille, [1824])
- Mysoria barcastus (Sepp, [1851])
- Parelbella ahira (Hewitson, [1866])
- Parelbella polyzona (Latreille, [1824])
- Passova glacia Evans, 1951
- Passova passova (Hewitson, [1866])
- Protelbella alburna (Mabille, 1891)
- Pyrrhopyge amyclas (Cramer, 1779)
- Pyrrhopyge amythaon Bell, 1931
- Pyrrhopyge arinas (Cramer, 1777)
- Pyrrhopyge creusae (Bell, 1931)
- Pyrrhopyge evansi Bell, 1947 or Pyrrhopyge phidias evansi
- Pyrrhopyge phidias (Linnaeus, 1758)
- Pyrrhopyge proculus Hopffer, 1874
- Pyrrhopyge sergius Hopffer, 1874
- Pyrrhopyge thericles Mabille, 1891
- Yanguna thelersa (Hewitson, 1866)

== Day-flying moths ==
- Urania leilus (Linnaeus, 1758)

== Sources ==
- Lépidoptères de Guyane, Lépidoptéristes de France, tomes III et IV, ISBN 2-9525440-3-4 and ISBN 2-9525440-4-2

== See also ==
- List of butterflies of the Amazon River basin and the Andes
