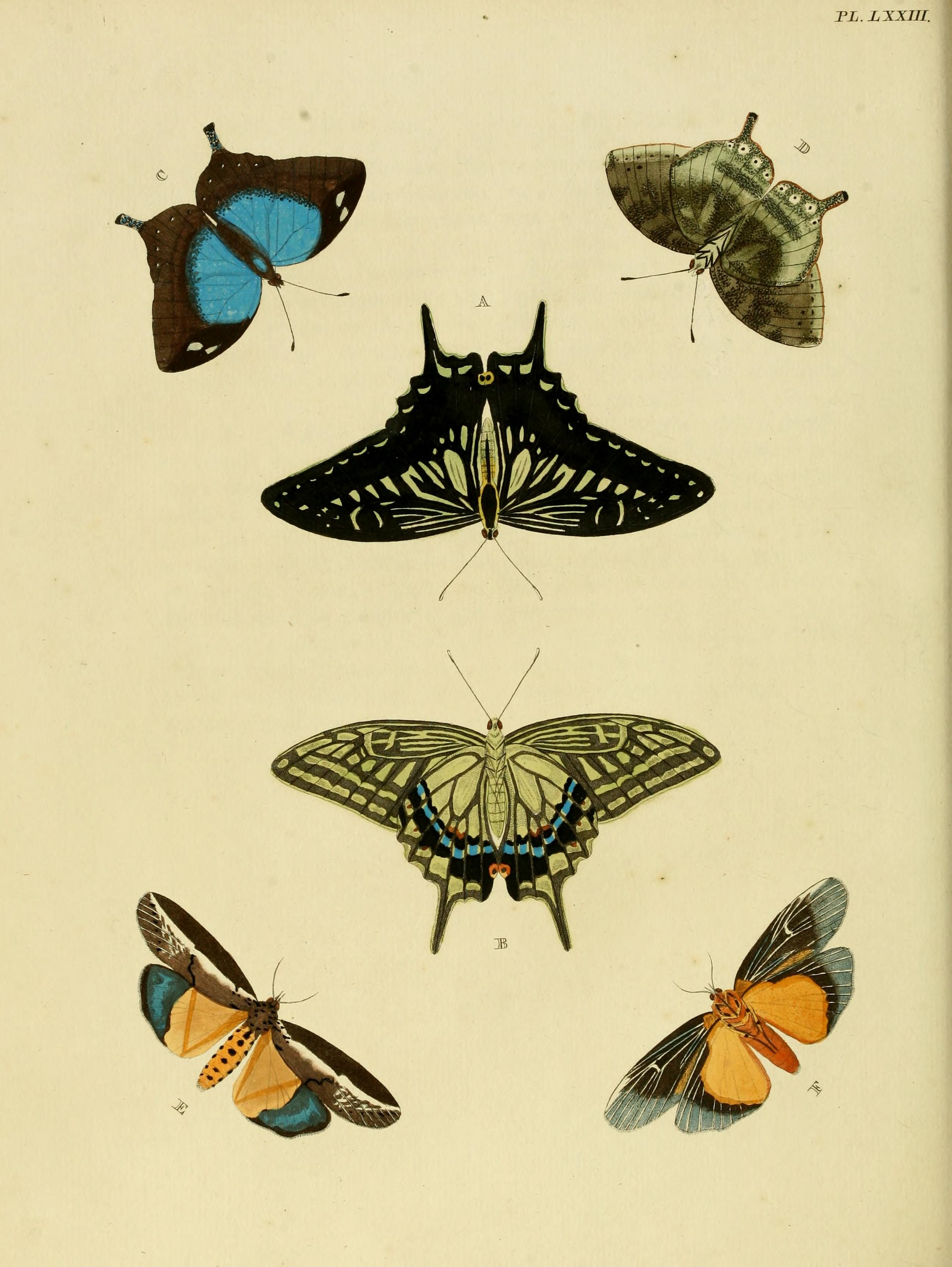

Scientific classification
- Kingdom: Animalia
- Phylum: Arthropoda
- Class: Insecta
- Order: Lepidoptera
- Family: Nymphalidae
- Tribe: Anaeini
- Genus: Memphis
- Species: M. laertes

Binomial name
- Memphis laertes (Cramer, 1775)

Synonyms
- Papilio laertes' Cramer, [1775]; Papilio eribotes Fabricius, 1775; Anaea laërtias Hübner, [1819]; Nymphalis laertia Godart, [1824]; Anaea eribotes halli Kaye, 1914; Anaea testacea Röber, 1916.

= Memphis laertes =

Species of butterfly

Memphis laertes is a species of leafwing found in South America (Trinidad and Tobago, Brazil, Suriname, and Guyana).

Memphis laertes is a butterfly with forewings with a humped costal edge, hooked inner angle, concave inner edge and hind wings each with a tail. The upper side of the wings is very dark brown with a more or less important metallic blue basal part and in the female a white preapical spot on the forewings. The reverse is bright yellow ochre, and simulates a dead leaf. testacea Röber a junior synonym of laertes has on the basal part of all the wings the same violet reflection as porphyrio, from which, however, it differs greatly beneath: the under surface is buff with small brownish and blackish spots; the centre of the hindwings is traversed by a very hazy brownish band; the distal margin is brownish, hazy, from the inner angle to the tail there stand black small spots bordered by a broad whitish one.

== Taxonomy ==
laertes may be a synonym of Memphis moruus.
