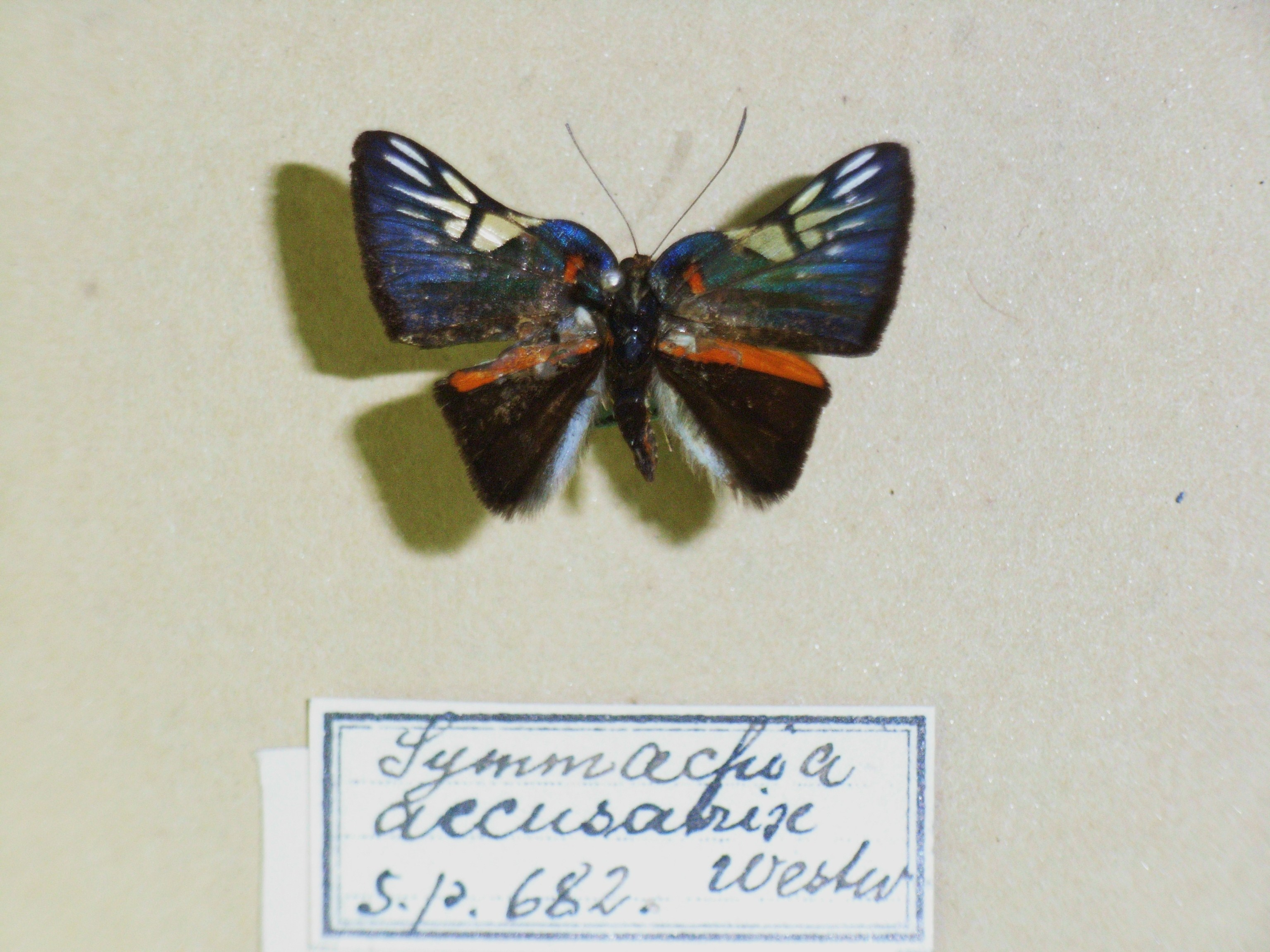

Scientific classification
- Kingdom: Animalia
- Phylum: Arthropoda
- Class: Insecta
- Order: Lepidoptera
- Family: Riodinidae
- Genus: Symmachia
- Species: S. accusatrix

Binomial name
- Symmachia accusatrix Westwood, 1851

= Symmachia accusatrix =

Species of butterfly

Symmachia accusatrix is a butterfly species present in Mexico, Ecuador, Colombia, Brazil and French Guiana.

The forewing is black (female blackish brown) in the costal part very much spotted in white. The female has white and reddish dots in the disc, in the male the costal part of the hindwing is scarlet red. Central America to the Amazon. Rare.

== See also ==
- List of butterflies of French Guiana
- List of Lepidoptera of Honduras
- List of butterflies of Mexico
