= Symmachia falcistriga =

- row g : Symmachia falcistriga

Scientific classification
- Kingdom: Animalia
- Phylum: Arthropoda
- Clade: Pancrustacea
- Class: Insecta
- Order: Lepidoptera
- Family: Riodinidae
- Genus: Symmachia
- Species: S. falcistriga

Binomial name
- Symmachia falcistriga Stichel, 1910

Synonyms
- Symmachia cribrellum Stichel, 1914

Species of butterfly

Symmachia falcistriga is a butterfly species in the family Riodinidae. It is present in Bolivia, Brazil, and French Guiana.

== Subspecies ==
- Symmachia falcistriga falcistriga (Bolivia, Brazil: Amazonas)
- Symmachia falcistriga meyi Brévignon, 1998 (French Guiana)

== See also ==
- List of butterflies of French Guiana
