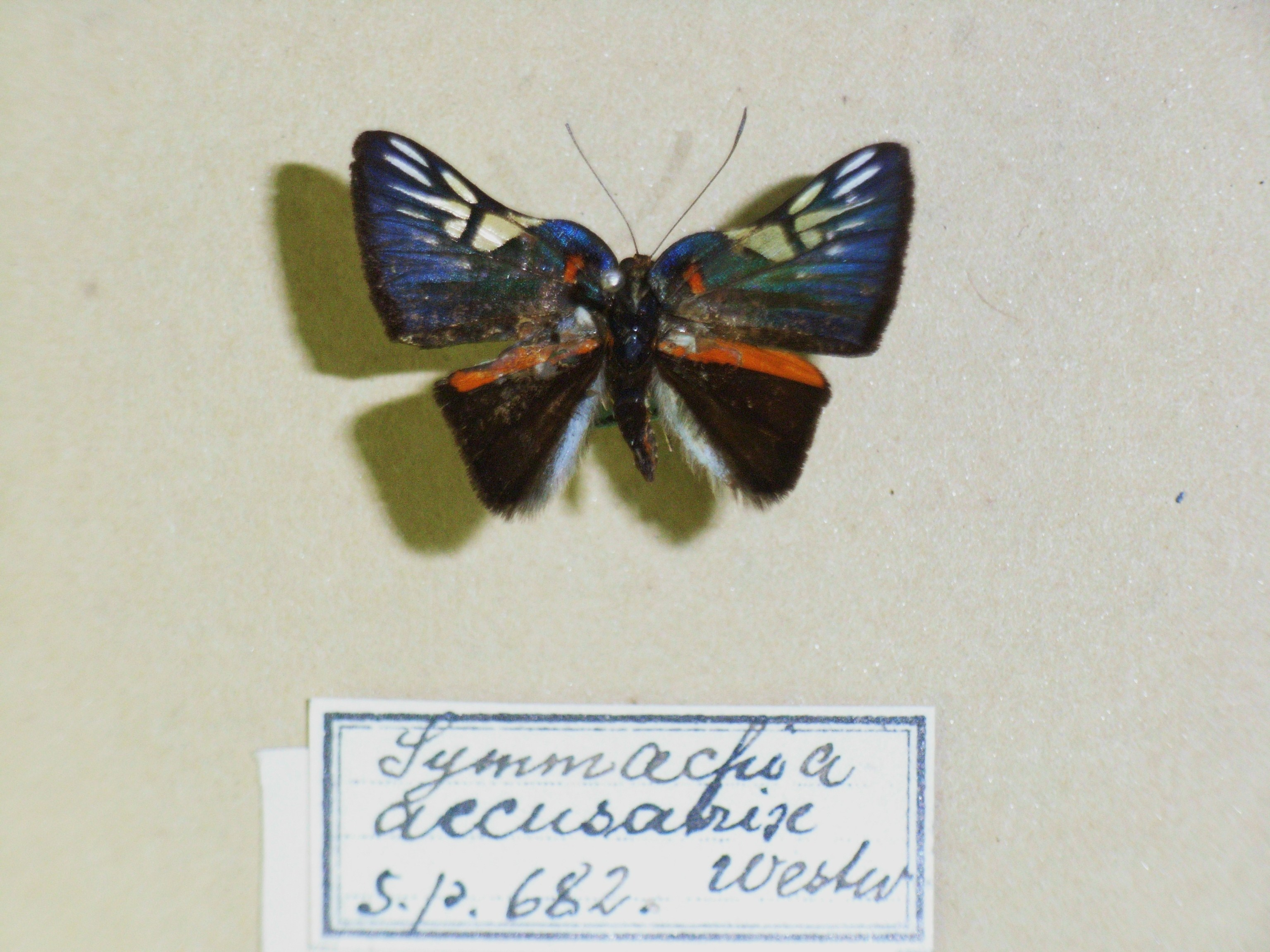
- Symmachia accusatrix

Scientific classification
- Kingdom: Animalia
- Phylum: Arthropoda
- Clade: Pancrustacea
- Class: Insecta
- Order: Lepidoptera
- Family: Riodinidae
- Subfamily: Riodininae
- Tribe: Symmachiini
- Genus: Symmachia; Hübner, [1819]

Synonyms
- Cricosoma C. & R. Felder, [1865]; Synapta C. & R. Felder, 1865 (preocc. Eschscholtz, 1829)

= Symmachia =

Genus of butterflies

Symmachia is a genus in the butterfly family Riodinidae present only in the Neotropical realm.

This genus is distinguished by a strong bulging-out of the costa of the forewing of the males, this characteristic bulge recedes in but few species, presumably owing to a mimetic transformation. This widening of the forewing is accompanied by a peculiar flight resembling that of Thecla, which becomes very conspicuous in the non-mimetic species, whereas in the mimetic species it is replaced by that of the causal originals to which reference is made in the single species, and which may more correctly be eliminated from the genus. They are more closely allied to the Gricosoma than the non-mimetic species, but we shall here give the precedence to the more typical forms. Many Symmachia are great rarities, and they are extremely peculiar in the shape as well as in the colouring. They fly in the day time, not continuously, and rest beneath leaves.

== Species ==
- Symmachia aconia Hewitson, 1876 present in Brazil
- Symmachia accusatrix Westwood, 1851 present in Mexico, Ecuador, Colombia, Brazil and French Guiana
- Symmachia almeidai (Zikán, 1946) present in Brazil
- Symmachia arcuata Hewitson, 1867 present in Brazil
- Symmachia arion (C. & R. Felder, 1865) present in Brazil and Colombia
- Symmachia aurigera (Weeks, 1902) present in Colombia
- Symmachia basilissa (Bates, 1868) present in Brazil and French Guiana
- Symmachia batesi (Staudinger, [1887]) present in Brazil
- Symmachia calderoni Hall & Lamas, 2001 present in Peru
- Symmachia calligrapha Hewitson, 1867 present in Brazil and French Guiana
- Symmachia calliste Hewitson, 1867 present in Brazil, Colombia, Nicaragua and French Guiana
- Symmachia elinas (Rebillard, 1958) present in Brazil
- Symmachia eraste (Bates, 1868) present in Brazil
- Symmachia emeralda Hall & Harvey, 2002 present in Ecuador and French Guiana
- Symmachia estellina present in French Guiana
- Symmachia exigua (Bates, 1868) present in Brazil
- Symmachia falcistriga Stichel, 1910 present in French Guiana, Bolivia and Brazil
- Symmachia fassli Hall & Willmott, 1995 present in Ecuador
- Symmachia fulvicauda Stichel, 1924 present in Brazil
- Symmachia hazelana Hall & Willmott, 1996 present in Ecuador
- Symmachia hetaerina Hewitson, 1867 present in Brazil and Peru
- Symmachia hippea Herrich-Schäffer, [1853] present in French Guiana, Guyana and Suriname
- Symmachia hippodice Godman, 1903 present in Brazil
- Symmachia jugurtha Staudinger, [1887] present in Colombia
- Symmachia juratrix Westwood, 1851 present in Brazil and French Guiana
- Symmachia leena Hewitson, 1870 present in Mexico, Panama, Nicaragua, Colombia, French Guiana and Brazil
- Symmachia leopardinum (C. & R. Felder, 1865) present in Brazil and French Guiana
- Symmachia maeonius Staudinger, 1888 present in Brazil
- Symmachia menetas (Drury, 1782) present in Suriname and Brazil
- Symmachia miron Grose-Smith, 1898 present in French Guiana and Ecuador
- Symmachia multesima Stichel, 1910 present in Colombia and French Guiana
- Symmachia nemesis Le Cerf, 1958 present in Brazil
- Symmachia norina Hewitson, 1867 present in Brazil and French Guiana
- Symmachia pardalia Stichel, 1924 present in Peru
- Symmachia pardalis Hewitson, 1867 present in Brazil and French Guiana
- Symmachia phaedra (Bates, 1868) present in Brazil and Ecuador
- Symmachia poirieri Gallard, 2009 present in French Guiana
- Symmachia praxilla Westwood, 1851 present in Brazil
- Symmachia probetor (Stoll, [1782]) present in Mexico, Nicaragua, Guatemala, Suriname, Guyana, French Guiana and Brazil
- Symmachia rita Staudinger, [1887] synonym of Symmachia norina
- Symmachia rosanti present in French Guiana
- Symmachia rubrica (Stichel, 1929) present in Colombia and Ecuador
- Symmachia rubina Bates, 1866 present in Mexico, Ecuador, Colombia, Bolivia and Brazil
- Symmachia sepyra (Hewitson, 1877) present in Ecuador
- Symmachia splendida (Salazar & Constantino, 1993) present in Colombia
- Symmachia stigmosissima Stichel, 1910 present in Bolivia and French Guiana
- Symmachia suevia Hewitson, 1877 present in Ecuador
- Symmachia technema Stichel, 1910 present in Suriname, French Guiana and Trinidad and Tobago
- Symmachia threissa Hewitson, 1870 present in French Guiana, Colombia and Nicaragua
- Symmachia tigrina Hewitson, 1867 present in Brazil and French Guiana
- Symmachia titiana Hewitson, 1870 present in Ecuador
- Symmachia triangularis (Thieme, 1907) present in Colombia and French Guiana
- Symmachia tricolor Hewitson, 1867 present in Mexico, Guatemala, Peru and French Guiana
- Symmachia virgatula Stichel, 1910 present in Colombia, Trinidad and Tobago and French Guiana
- Symmachia virgaurea Stichel, 1910 present in Colombia
- Symmachia xypete (Hewitson, 1870) present in Nicaragua and Panama
