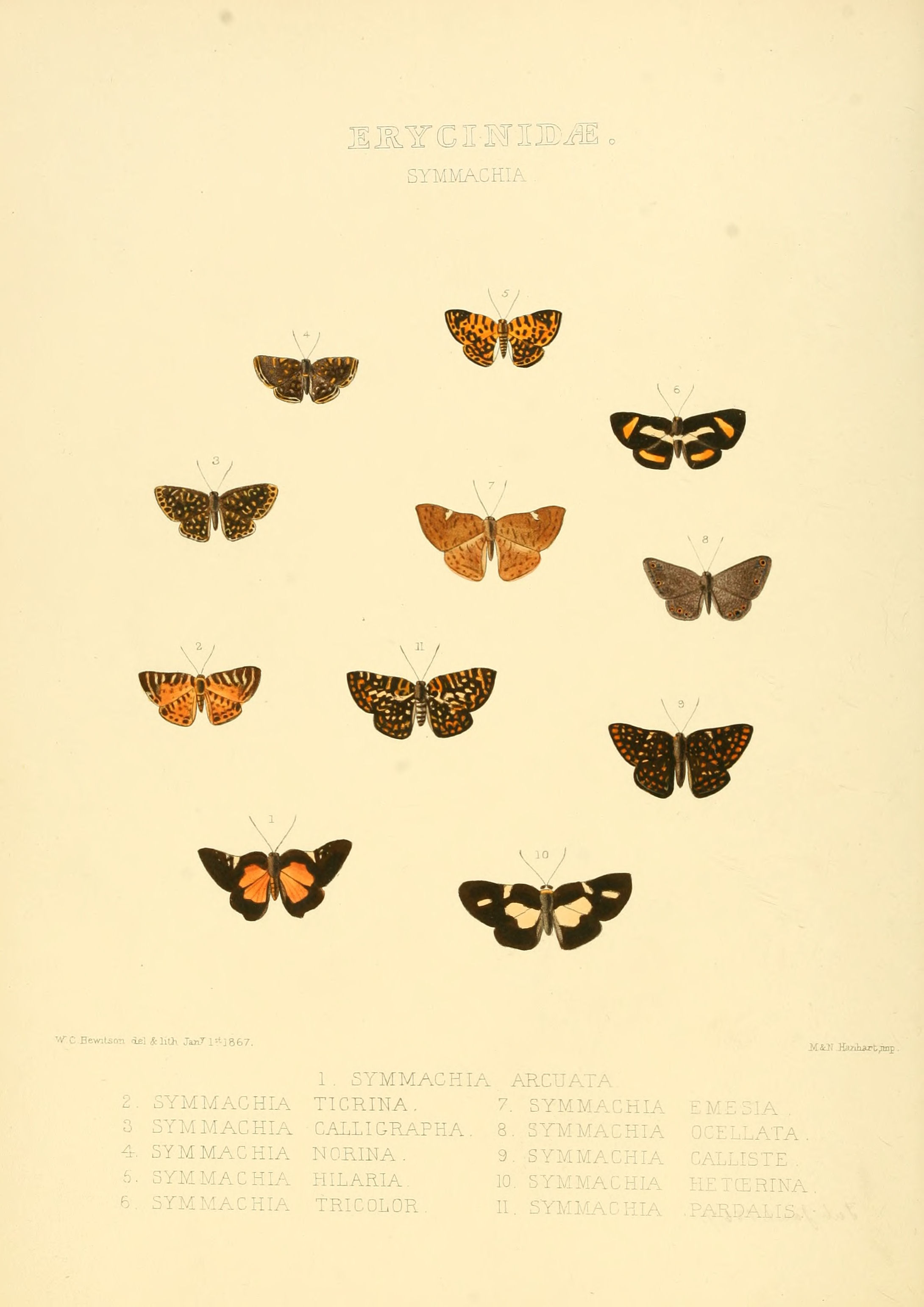
- Figure 9, accepted as Symmachia calliste

Scientific classification
- Domain: Eukaryota
- Kingdom: Animalia
- Phylum: Arthropoda
- Class: Insecta
- Order: Lepidoptera
- Family: Riodinidae
- Genus: Symmachia
- Species: S. calliste

Binomial name
- Symmachia calliste Hewitson, 1867

Synonyms
- Symmachia cleonyma Hewitson, 1870

= Symmachia calliste =

Species of butterfly

Symmachia calliste is a butterfly species of the family Riodinidae. It is present in Colombia, Brazil, Nicaragua and French Guiana.

== See also ==
- List of butterflies of French Guiana
