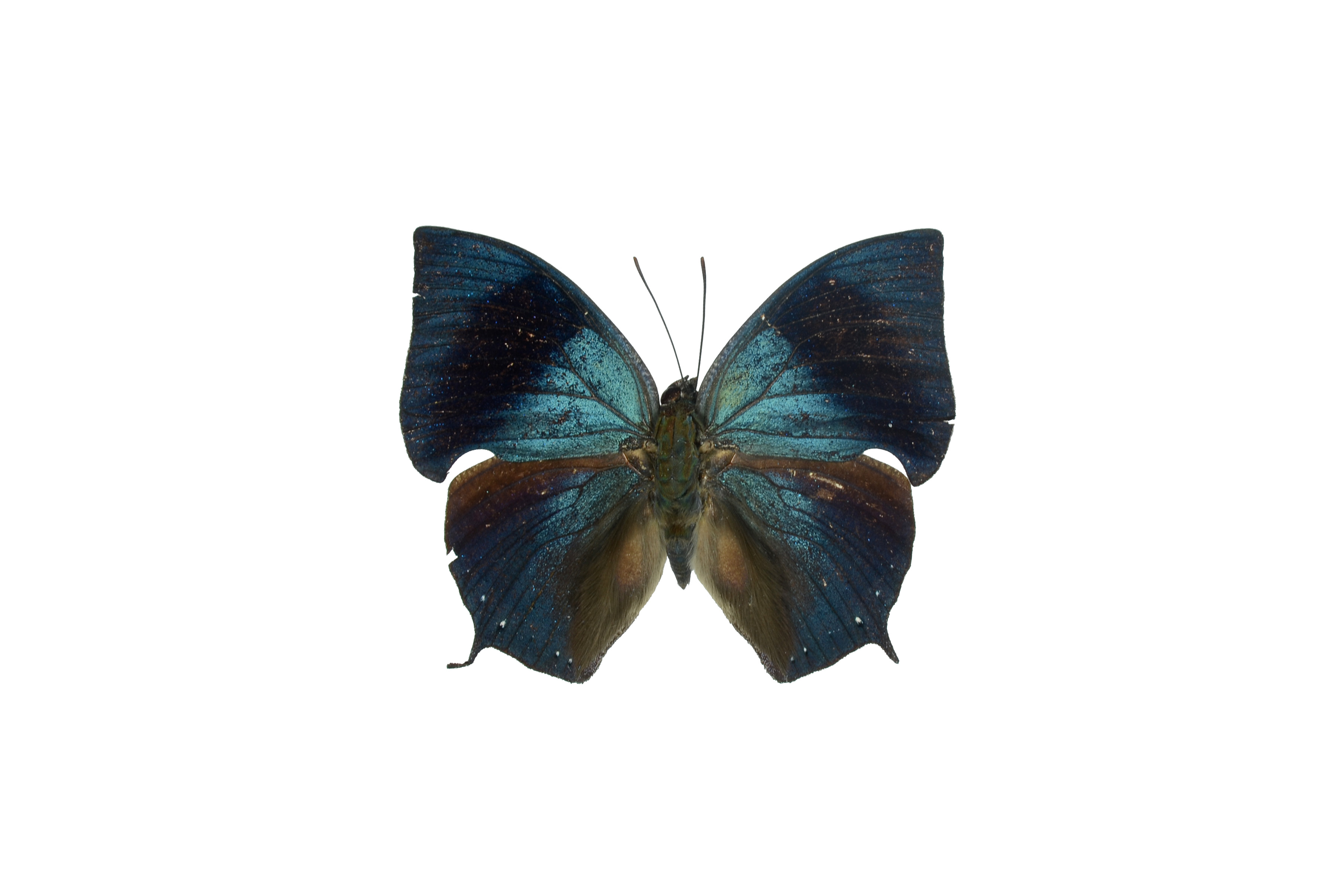

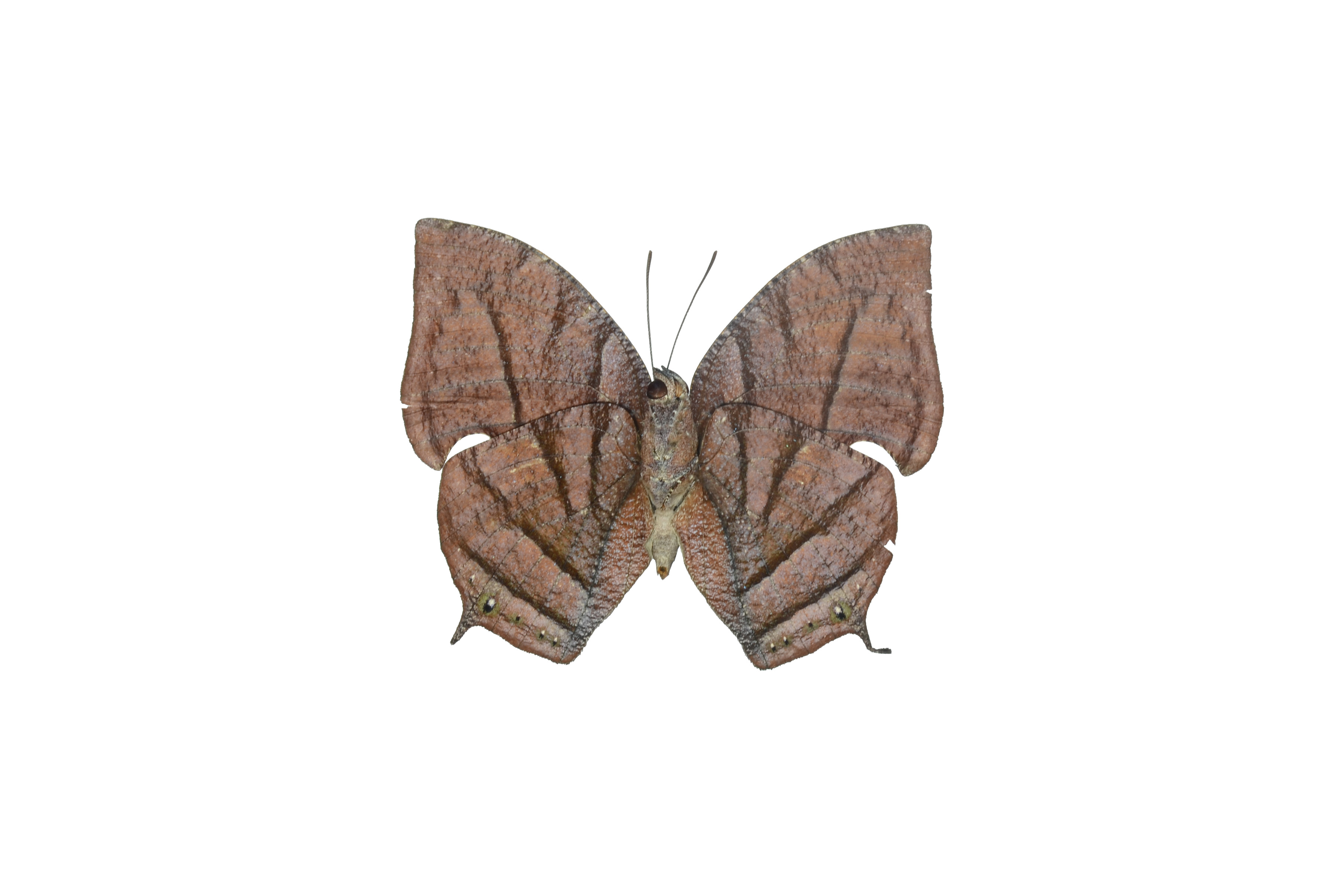

Scientific classification
- Kingdom: Animalia
- Phylum: Arthropoda
- Class: Insecta
- Order: Lepidoptera
- Family: Nymphalidae
- Genus: Memphis
- Species: M. philumena

Binomial name
- Memphis philumena (Doubleday, 1849)

= Memphis philumena =

Species of butterfly

Memphis philumena is a species of leafwing butterfly found in Central and South America (Mexico, Costa Rica, Guatemala, Panama, Colombia, Venezuela, Bolivia, Venezuela, Ecuador, Peru, Brazil, and Guyana).

== Subspecies ==
- Memphis philumena indigotica Salvin, 1869
- Memphis philumena xenica (H.Bates, 1864)

== Description ==
Memphis philumena has a wingspan of 55 mm to 60 mm. The forewings have a humped costal edge, angular apex, hook-like inner angle, and very concave inner edge. Each hindwing bears a tail. The upper part of the male is very dark, almost black with a metallic blue basal part. In females, the forewing is barred by a broad orange band that separates the apex, and the costal edge of the hindwing is marked with orange. The underside is shiny brown and simulates a dead leaf. The under surface of the male resembles entirely that of ates.
