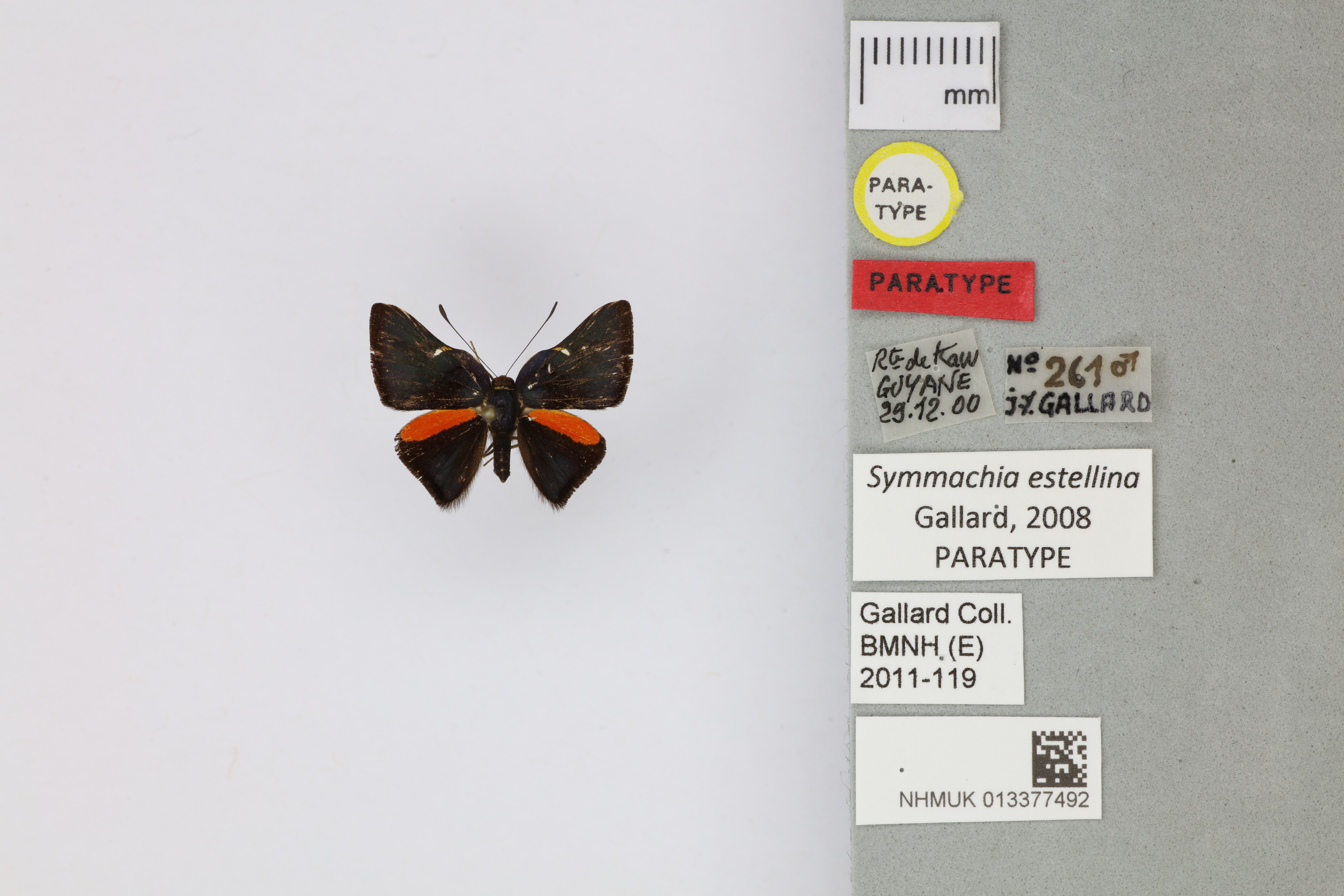

Scientific classification
- Domain: Eukaryota
- Kingdom: Animalia
- Phylum: Arthropoda
- Class: Insecta
- Order: Lepidoptera
- Family: Riodinidae
- Genus: Symmachia
- Species: S. estellina

Binomial name
- Symmachia estellina Gallard, 2008

= Symmachia estellina =

Species of butterfly

Symmachia estellina is a butterfly species in the family Riodinidae. It is present in French Guiana and Brazil.

== See also ==
- List of butterflies of French Guiana
