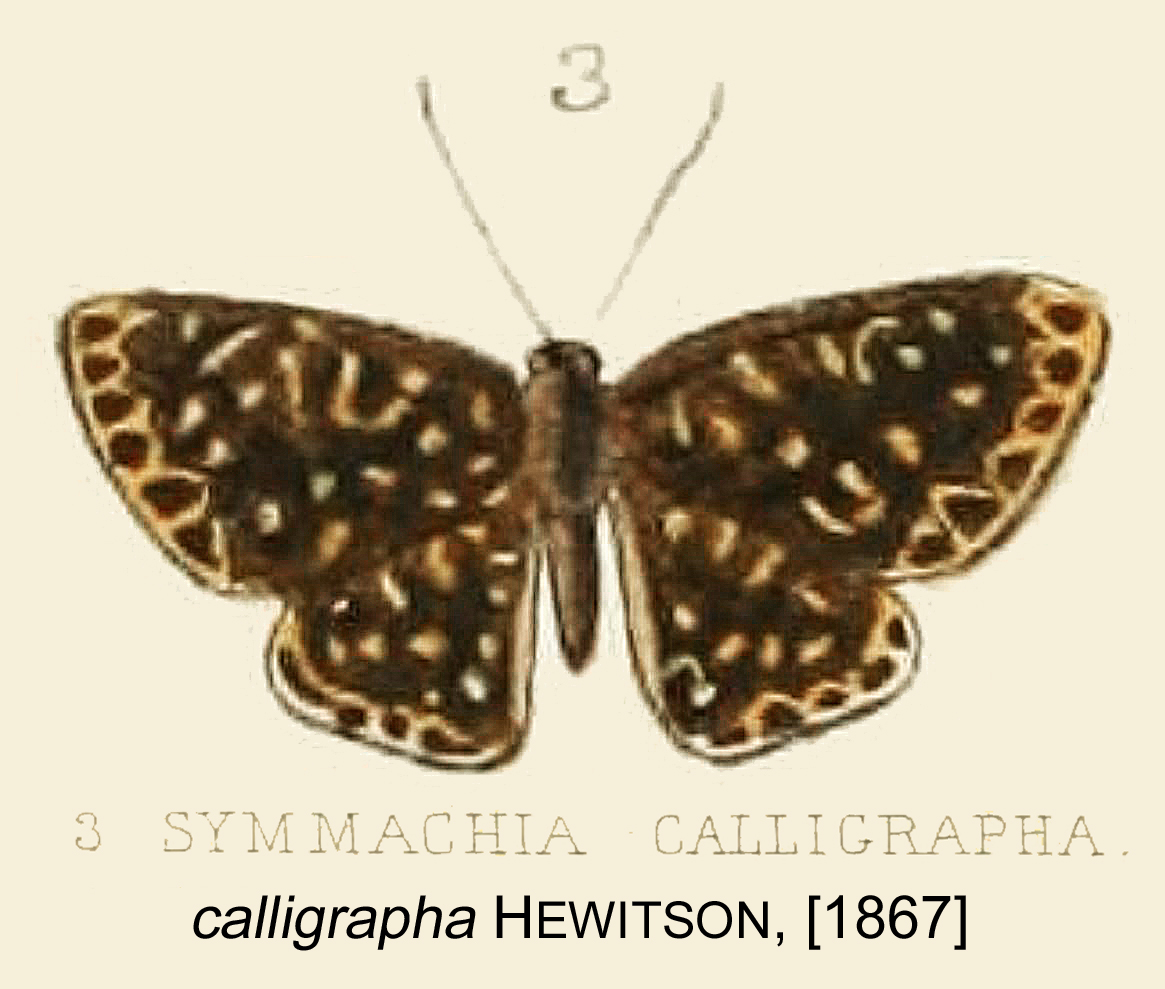

Scientific classification
- Domain: Eukaryota
- Kingdom: Animalia
- Phylum: Arthropoda
- Class: Insecta
- Order: Lepidoptera
- Family: Riodinidae
- Genus: Symmachia
- Species: S. calligrapha

Binomial name
- Symmachia calligrapha Hewitson, 1867

= Symmachia calligrapha =

Species of butterfly

Symmachia calligrapha is a butterfly species of the family Riodinidae. It is present in Brazil (Pará) and French Guiana.

== See also ==
- List of butterflies of French Guiana
