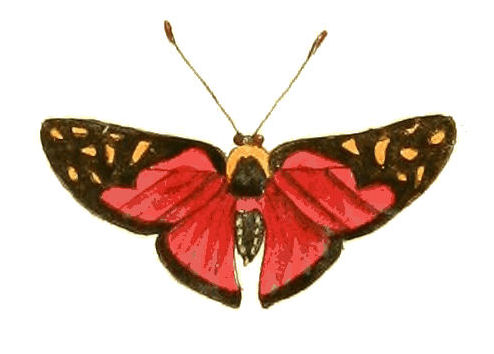
- Illustration by Dru Drury

Scientific classification
- Kingdom: Animalia
- Phylum: Arthropoda
- Class: Insecta
- Order: Lepidoptera
- Family: Riodinidae
- Genus: Symmachia
- Species: S. menetas

Binomial name
- Symmachia menetas (Drury, 1782)

Synonyms
- Papilio menetas Drury, 1782; Hesperia tacitus Fabricius, 1793; Emesis menetis Hübner, [1819]; Symmachia eurina Schaus, 1902; Symmachia menetas pilarius Stichel, 1910

= Symmachia menetas =

Species of butterfly

Symmachia menetas is a species in the butterfly family Riodinidae found in Brazil and Suriname. It was first described by Dru Drury in 1782.

== Description ==
Upperside. Antennae black. Front of the head yellow. Thorax black, with two yellow streaks at the base of the wings. Abdomen dark brown. Half of the superior wings black, beginning at the shoulders, and running to the external edges, on which are seven cream-coloured spots variously shaped. The other half of these wings is scarlet, without any marks. Posterior wings entirely scarlet, edged with black.

Underside. Palpi cream coloured. Breast and abdomen light yellow. Legs black, but underneath pale yellow. Wings coloured as on the upperside. Margins of the wings entire. Wingspan 1 1/4 inches (33 mm).

== Subspecies ==
- Symmachia menetas menetas (Brazil, Suriname)
- Symmachia menetas eurina Schaus, 1902 (Brazil: Paraná, Santa Catarina)
