= Symmachia basilissa =

Scientific classification
- Domain: Eukaryota
- Kingdom: Animalia
- Phylum: Arthropoda
- Class: Insecta
- Order: Lepidoptera
- Family: Riodinidae
- Genus: Symmachia
- Species: S. basilissa

Binomial name
- Symmachia basilissa (Bates, 1868)

Synonyms
- Mesene basilissa Bates, 1868

Species of butterfly

Symmachia basilissa is a butterfly species of the family Riodinidae. It is present in Brazil and French Guiana.

== Subspecies ==
- Symmachia basilissa basilissa (Brazil: Pará)
- Symmachia basilissa paracatuensis Callaghan, 2001 (Brazil: Minas Gerais)

== See also ==
- List of butterflies of French Guiana
