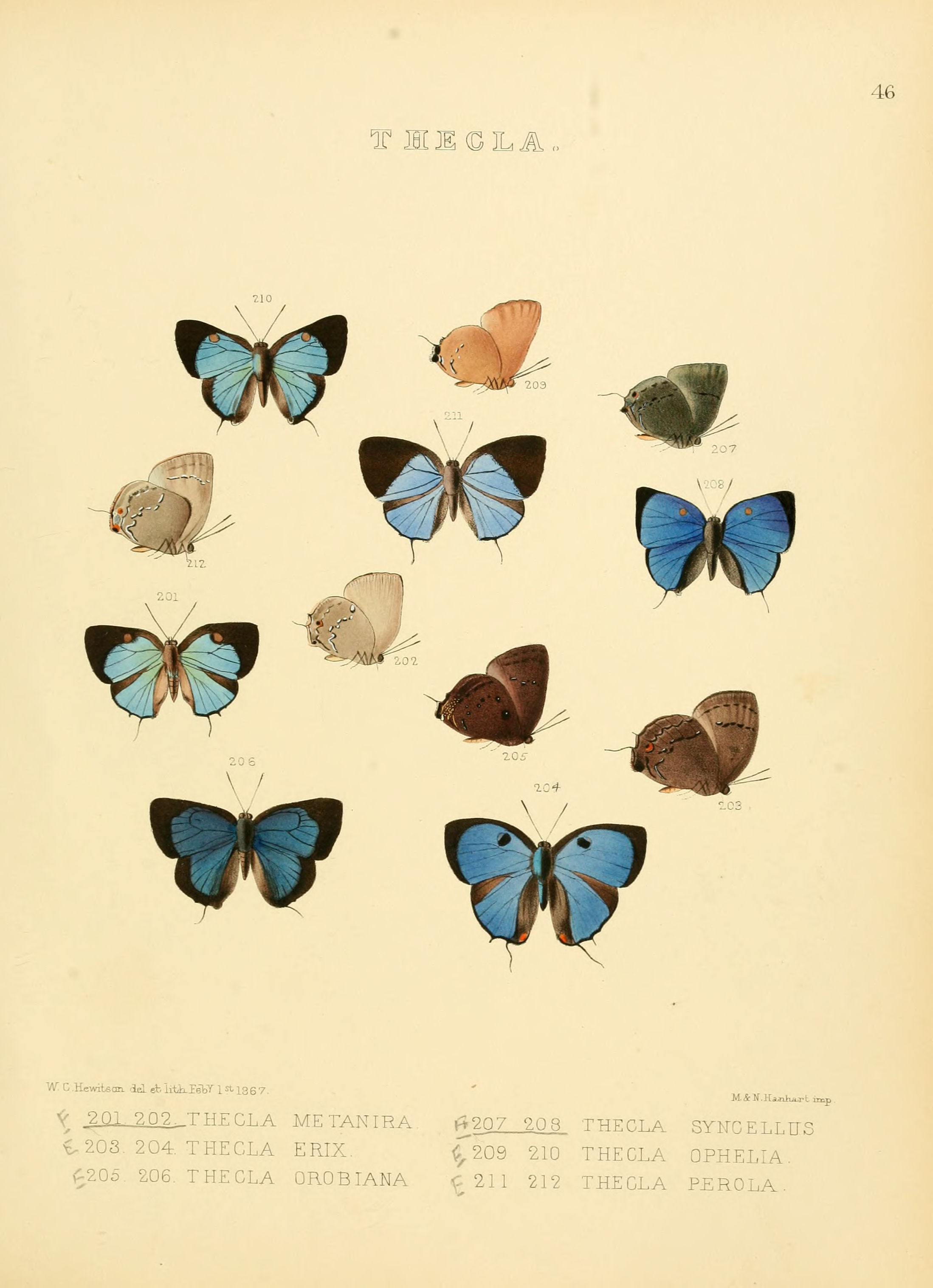
- Exorbaetta metanira, figures 201 and 202

Scientific classification
- Kingdom: Animalia
- Phylum: Arthropoda
- Clade: Pancrustacea
- Class: Insecta
- Order: Lepidoptera
- Family: Lycaenidae
- Tribe: Eumaeini
- Genus: Exorbaetta; Johnson, Austin, Le Crom & Salazar, 1997
- Species: E. metanira

Binomial name
- Exorbaetta metanira (Hewitson, 1867)

= Exorbaetta =

Monotypic butterfly genus in family Lycaenidae

Exorbaetta is a Neotropical genus of butterflies in the family Lycaenidae. The genus is monotypic containing the single species Exorbaetta metanira
