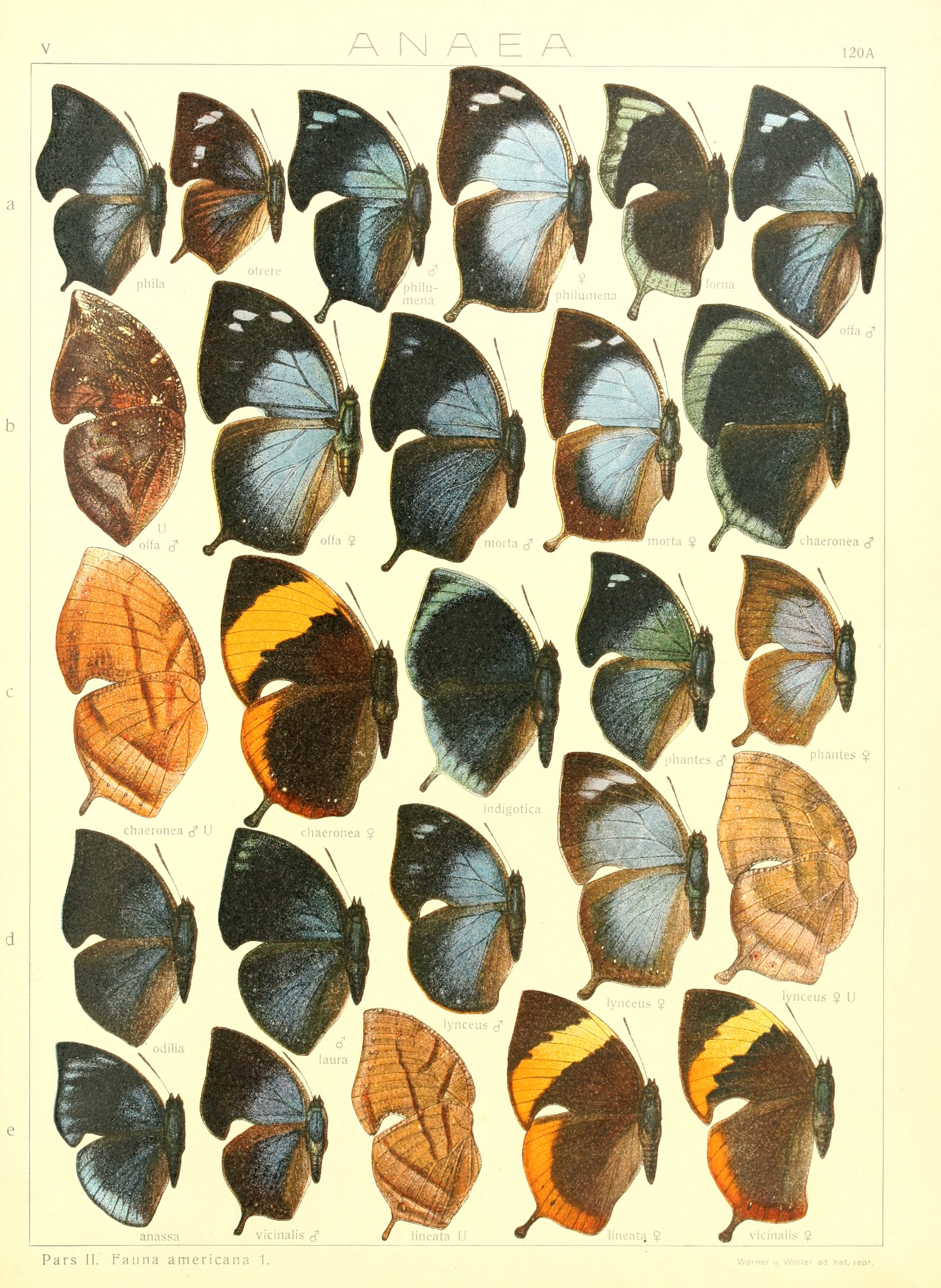
- In Seitz's Macrolepidoptera of the World as odilia (Stoll, 1780) (junior synonym)

Scientific classification
- Kingdom: Animalia
- Phylum: Arthropoda
- Class: Insecta
- Order: Lepidoptera
- Family: Nymphalidae
- Tribe: Anaeini
- Genus: Memphis
- Species: M. polycarmes

Binomial name
- Memphis polycarmes (Fabricius, 1775)

= Memphis polycarmes =

Species of butterfly

Memphis polycarmes is a species of leafwing found in South America (Brazil, Peru, Guyana, Suriname).

Memphis polycarmes is a butterfly with forewings with a humped costal edge, angular apex, almost straight outer edge, hook-shaped inner angle, concave inner edge and hind wings each with a club-shaped tail. The upper side of the male's wings is brown or purple more or less dark with a broad basal metallic blue suffusion, that of the female is brown with a metallic blue basal and in both the forewings and hindwings are bordered by an orange fringe. The reverse side is bright yellow ochre and simulates a dead leaf. Seitz - A. odilia Cr. (= polycarmes F.) (120 Ad, 120 Bd) is a rare species from the Upper Amazon. The. upper surface is lighter or darker, but always unmarked. The under surface exhibits more or less white scaling. The female is above greyish-brown with glossy blue scaling, except dull margins; several indistinct bluish subapical spots. Under surface light greyish-brown with a slight cloudy marking on the hindwings and small white spots at the distal margin of the hindwings.
