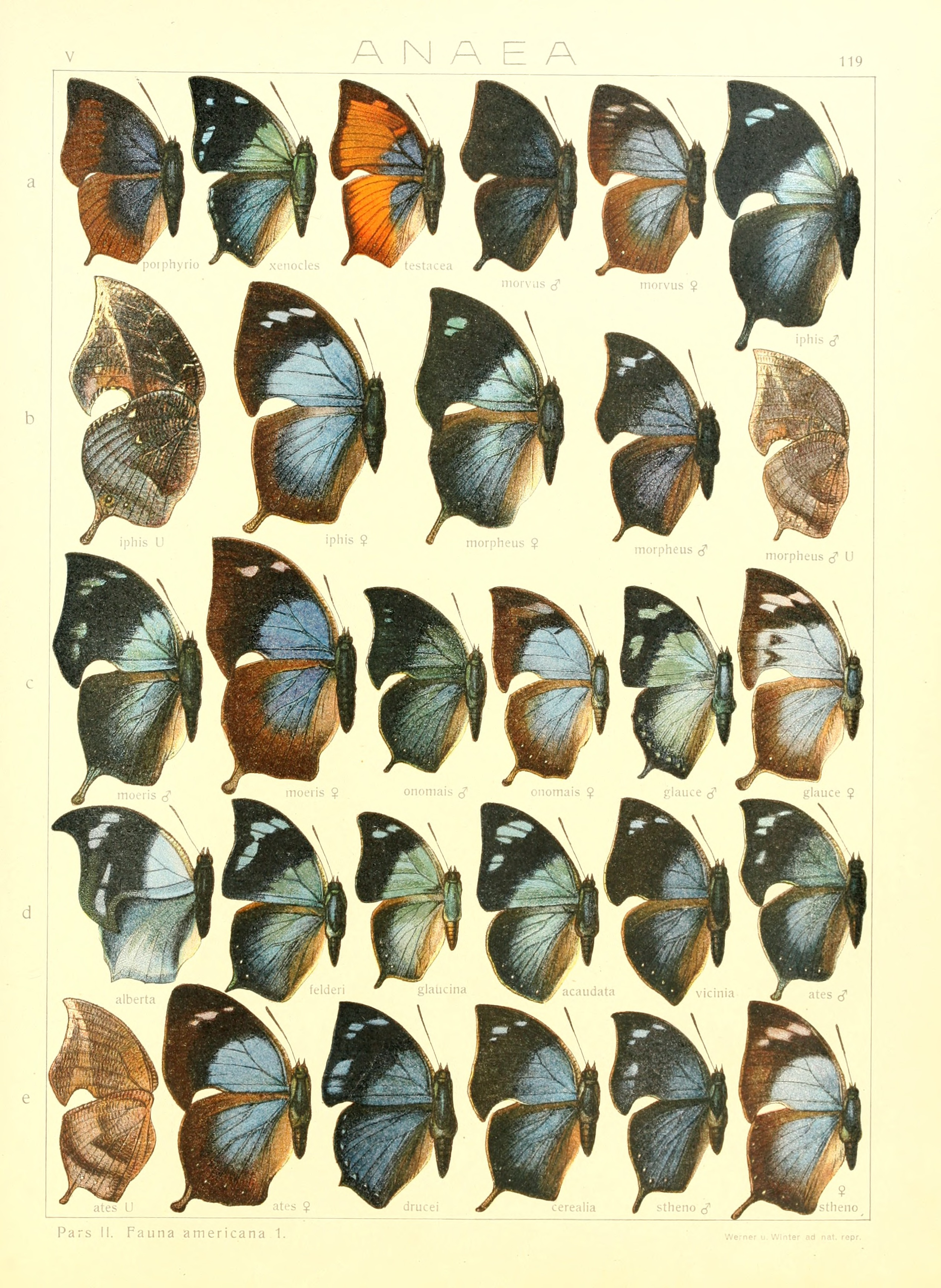

Scientific classification
- Kingdom: Animalia
- Phylum: Arthropoda
- Clade: Pancrustacea
- Class: Insecta
- Order: Lepidoptera
- Family: Nymphalidae
- Tribe: Anaeini
- Genus: Memphis
- Species: M. basilia

Binomial name
- Memphis basilia (Stoll, 1780)

= Memphis basilia =

Species of butterfly

Memphis basilia is a species of leafwing found in South America.

== Subspecies ==
- Memphis basilia basilia; present in Suriname.
- Memphis basilia bella (Comstock, 1961); present in Colombia.
- Memphis basilia drucei (Staudinger, 1887); present in Peru.

It is also found in Guyana.

== Description ==
Memphis basilia is a butterfly with forewings with a humped costal edge, pointed apex, concave outer edge near the apex, concave inner edge and hind wings each with a tail. The upper side of the male's wings is dark blue with a discreet basal metallic blue suffusion and on the forewings a few blue spots near the apex, the female's is light brown with a mauve basal part (light purple). The underside is bright orange mottled with pearly white and simulates a dead leaf.
