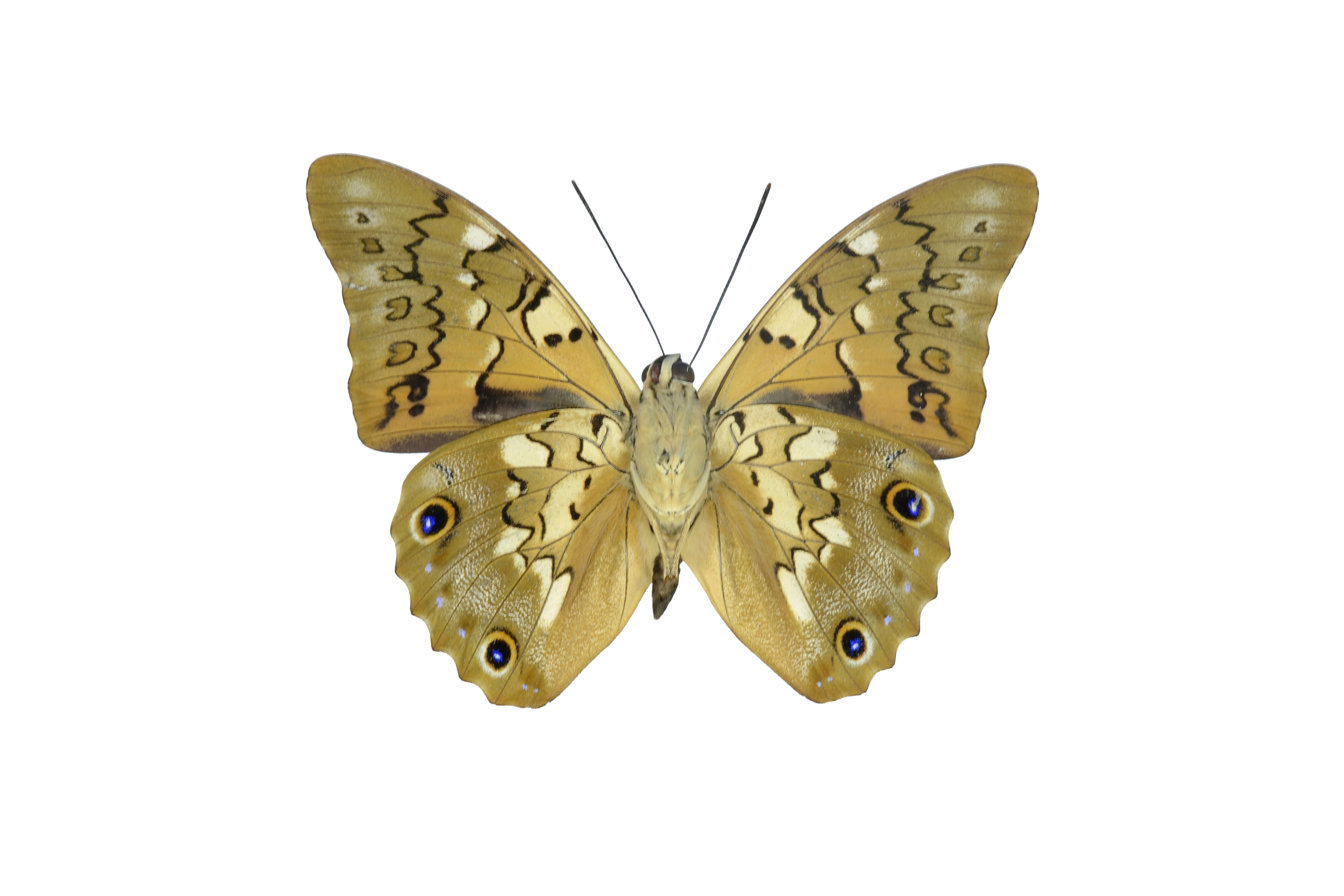

Scientific classification
- Kingdom: Animalia
- Phylum: Arthropoda
- Clade: Pancrustacea
- Class: Insecta
- Order: Lepidoptera
- Family: Nymphalidae
- Genus: Prepona
- Species: P. pylene

Binomial name
- Prepona pylene Hewitson, 1853

Synonyms
- Prepona miranda Staudinger, [1885]; Prepona pylene santina Fruhstorfer, 1897; Prepona pylene proschion Fruhstorfer, 1904; Prepona transiens Fruhstorfer, 1905; Prepona eugenes Bates, 1865; Prepona simois C. & R. Felder, 1867; Prepona eugenes var. ecuadorica Strand, 1921; Prepona eugenes ameinogenes Röber, 1928; Prepona gnorima Bates, 1865; Prepona demophile Westwood, 1850; Prepona demophile C. & R. Felder, 1867; Prepona eugenes argyria Fruhstorfer, 1916; Prepona laertides Staudinger, 1898; Prepona eugenes diluta Fruhstorfer, 1904; Prepona eugenes decorata Fruhstorfer, 1904; Prepona pylene philetas Fruhstorfer, 1904

= Prepona pylene =

Species of butterfly

Prepona pylene, the narrow-banded shoemaker, is a species of butterfly in the family Nymphalidae. It was first described by William Chapman Hewitson in 1853. It is found from Honduras to Paraguay in rainforests at altitudes between 400 and 1,000 meters.

== Subspecies ==
- Prepona pylene pylene (Brazil: Rio de Janeiro, Santa Catarina, Espírito Santo, Rio Grande do Sul)
- Prepona pylene bahiana Fruhstorfer, 1897 (Brazil: Bahia)
- Prepona pylene eugenes Bates, 1865 (Bolivia, Ecuador, Colombia, Brazil: Pará)
- Prepona pylene gnorima Bates, 1865 (Honduras to Colombia)
- Prepona pylene jordani Fruhstorfer, 1905 (Ecuador)
- Prepona pylene laertides Staudinger, 1898 (Bolivia, Paraguay, Brazil: Minas Gerais)
- Prepona pylene philetas Fruhstorfer, 1904 (Honduras)
