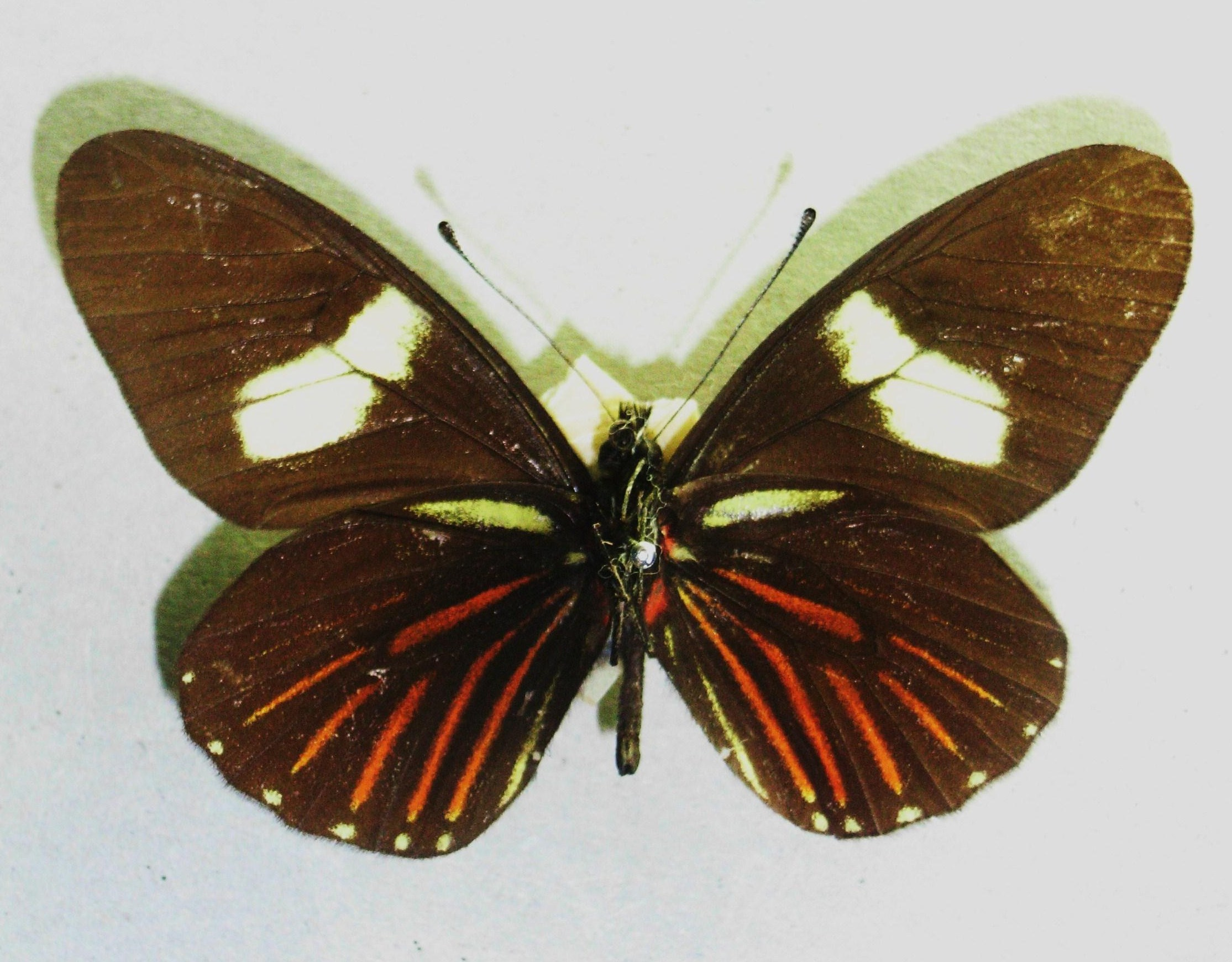
- A. b. negrina

Scientific classification
- Kingdom: Animalia
- Phylum: Arthropoda
- Class: Insecta
- Order: Lepidoptera
- Family: Pieridae
- Genus: Archonias; Hübner, 1825
- Species: A. brassolis

Binomial name
- Archonias brassolis (Fabricius, 1777)

Synonyms
- Genus: Euterpe Swainson, 1831; Clio Herrich-Schäffer, 1858; Species: Papilio brassolis Fabricius, 1777; Papilio bellona Cramer, 1775 (preocc. Fabricius, 1775); Papilio erycinia Cramer, 1777; Heliconia braselis Godart, 1819; Papilio tereas Godart, [1819]; Euterpe terea Swainson, 1831; Priamides julius Hübner, 1823; Archonias marcias Hübner, 1825; Euterpe critias C. & R. Felder, 1859; Euterpe negrina C. & R. Felder, 1862; Archonias bellona hyrnetho Fruhstorfer, 1907; Euterpe approximata Butler, 1873; Archonias approximata Godman & Salvin, [1889]; Archonias cutila Fruhstorfer, 1907

= Archonias =

Cattleheart white

Monotypic butterfly genus in family Pieridae

Archonias is a monotypic genus of butterflies in the family Pieridae. Archonias brassolis, the cattleheart white, is its sole species. It is found from Central America, south through most of South America.

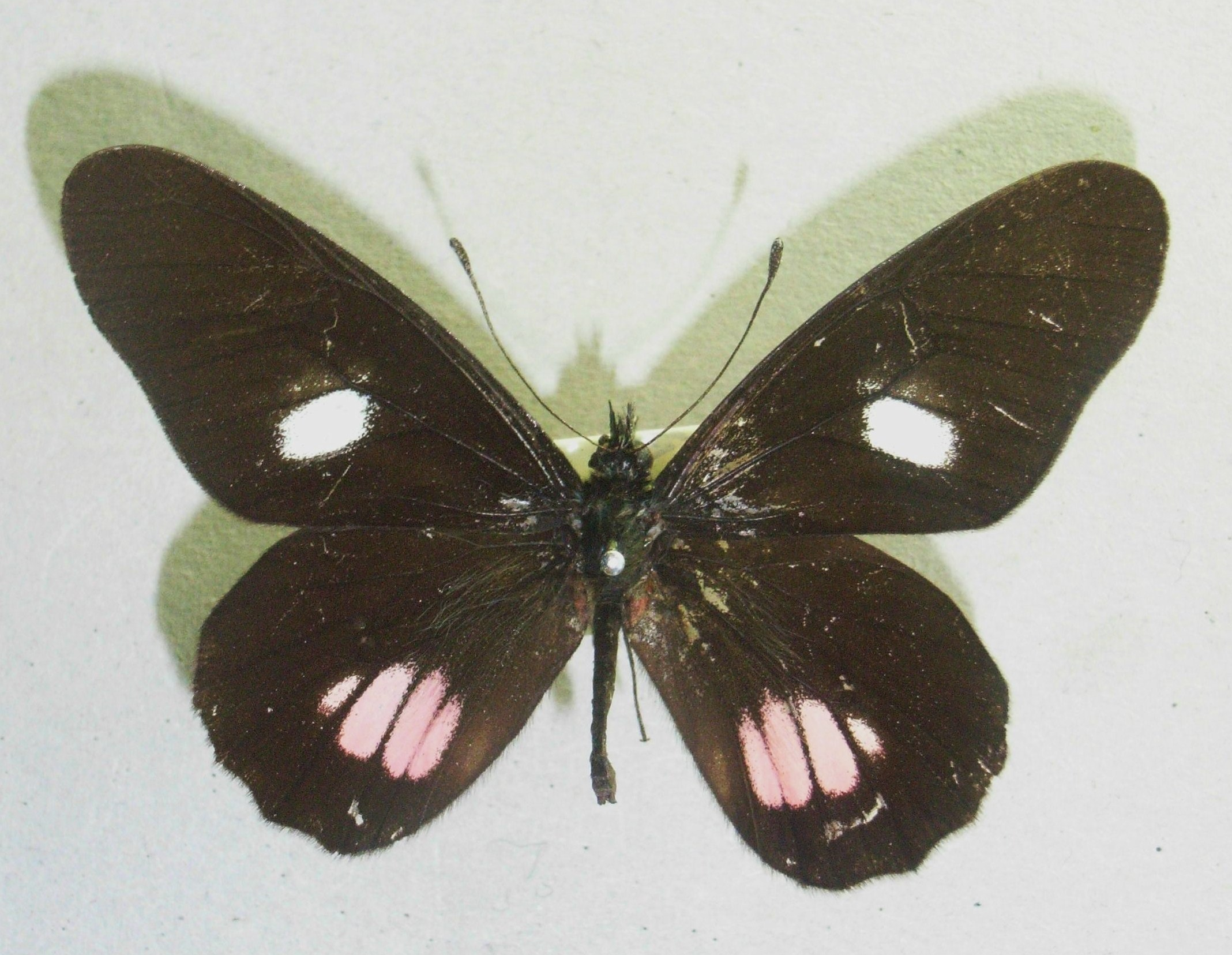
A. b. tereas

The wingspan is 56–65 mm for A. b. rubrosparsa and 31–34 mm for A. b. approximata. Adults of A. b. approximata have been recorded feeding on the nectar of Eupatorium species.

== Subspecies ==
- A. b. approximata (Guatemala, Honduras, Costa Rica, Panama)
- A. b. brassolis (Surinam, Guianas)
- A. b. critias (Venezuela, Colombia)
- A. b. cutila (Ecuador)
- A. b. marcias (Brazil)
- A. b. negrina (Ecuador, Bolivia, Argentina, Peru)
- A. b. nigripennis (Colombia)
- A. b. rosacea (Ecuador, Venezuela)
- A. b. rubrosparsa (Ecuador)
- A. b. tereas (Brazil)

There is also one undescribed subspecies from Colombia.
