= Symmachia emeralda =

Scientific classification
- Domain: Eukaryota
- Kingdom: Animalia
- Phylum: Arthropoda
- Class: Insecta
- Order: Lepidoptera
- Family: Riodinidae
- Genus: Symmachia
- Species: S. emeralda

Binomial name
- Symmachia emeralda Hall et Harvey, 2002

Species of butterfly

Symmachia emeralda is a butterfly species in the family Riodinidae. It is present in Ecuador and French Guiana.
