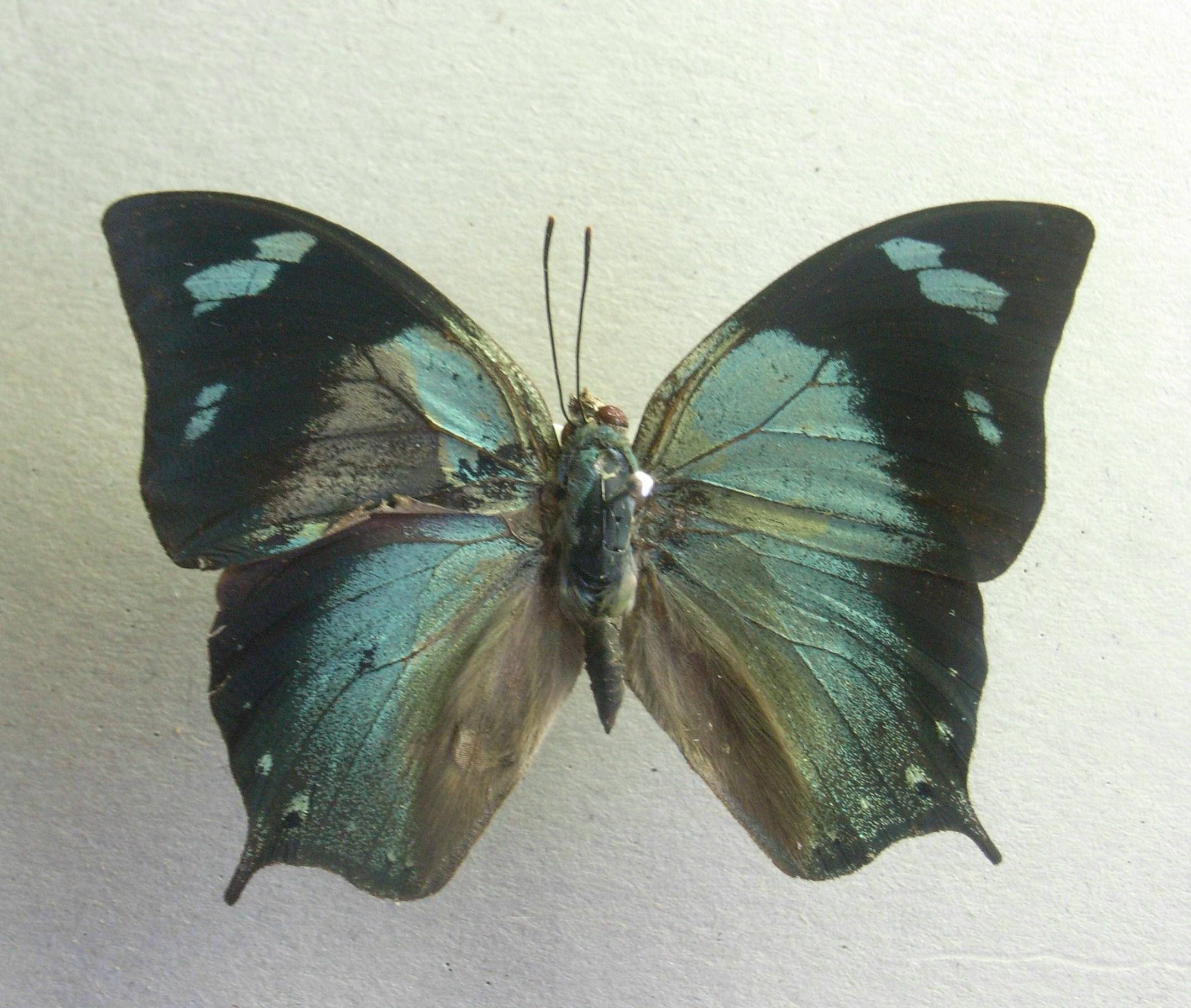

Scientific classification
- Kingdom: Animalia
- Phylum: Arthropoda
- Class: Insecta
- Order: Lepidoptera
- Family: Nymphalidae
- Genus: Memphis
- Species: M. glauce

Binomial name
- Memphis glauce (C. Felder & R. Felder, 1862)

= Memphis glauce =

Species of butterfly

Memphis glauce is a species of leafwing found in South America.

Subspecies are:

- Memphis glauce glauce; present in Peru
- Memphis glauce centralis (Röber, 1916); present in Costa Rica, Honduras, and Panama
- Memphis glauce cicla (Möschler, 1877); present in Suriname and Brazil
- Memphis glauce felderi (Röber, 1916); present in Ecuador

Memphis glauce is a butterfly with a wingspan of about 52 mm, with forewings with a humped costal edge, angular apex, outer edge almost straight. Each hindwing bears a pointed tail. The upper part is blue without the basal part, navy blue almost black from the postdiscal area. The reverse is brown mottled with silver and simulates a dead leaf. The habitat is tropical rainforest below 800 m.

ssp.centralis smaller and more slender with a greatly reduced, green basal colouring, particularly of the hindwings; the under surface is much lighter (grey with a slight reddish shine), less dark markings. ssp. felderi greenish-blue basal area reduced, whereas the submarginal marking of the same colour is more developed. The under surface is lighter, though more contrasting, on the outer part of the hindwings greenish. ssp. cincla inner margin of the forewings is straight. The larger inner half of the wings is above of a light blue silver with a greenish shine; in the dark border there is a small blue, subapical spot; before the small tail of the hindwing there stands a black spot with a blue pupil. The under surface seems likewise to.
