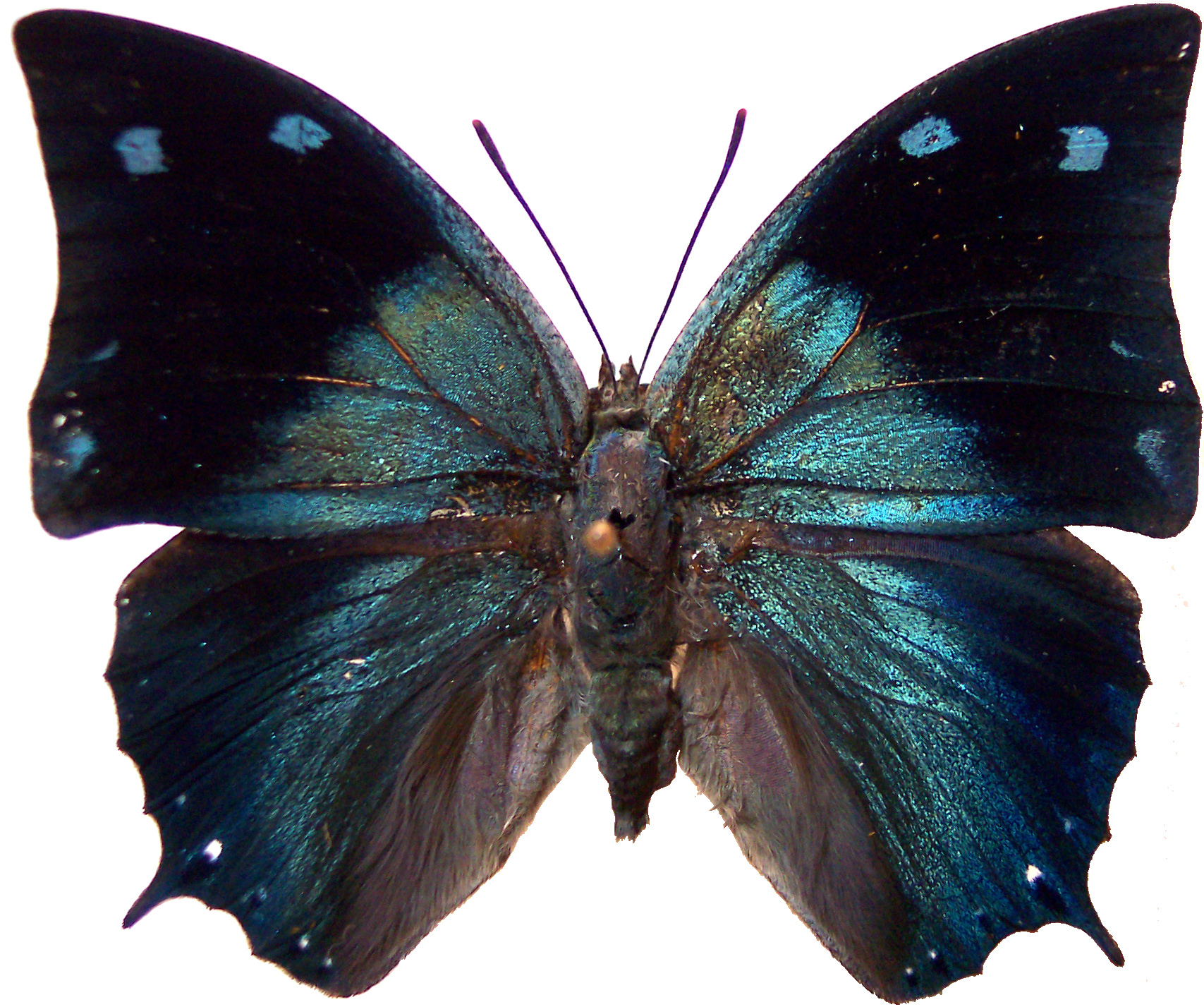

Scientific classification
- Kingdom: Animalia
- Phylum: Arthropoda
- Class: Insecta
- Order: Lepidoptera
- Family: Nymphalidae
- Tribe: Anaeini
- Genus: Memphis
- Species: M. xenocles

Binomial name
- Memphis xenocles (Westwood, 1850)

= Memphis xenocles =

Species of butterfly

Memphis xenocles is a species of leafwing found in South America.

== Subspecies ==
- Memphis xenocles xenocles (Westwood, 1850); present in Colombia, Bolivia, and Guyana
- Memphis xenocles carolina (Comstock, 1961); present in Mexico
- Memphis xenocles fisilis (Hall, 1935); present in Colombia
- Memphis xenocles marginalis (Hall, 1935); present in Brazil

== Description ==
Memphis xenocles is a butterfly with a wingspan of about 52 mm to 60 mm, with forewings with a humped costal edge, angular apex, almost straight outer edge and slightly concave inner edge. Each hindwing bears a tail.

The upper part is navy blue or brown with a metallic blue basal part and a few blue spots on the forewings near the apex.

The underside is brown covered with pearly white and simulates a dead leaf.

Seitz: "A. xenocles Westw. (= xenoclea Stgr.) (119 a) is distributed from Guatemala to Bolivia and Rio de Janeiro and seems to be very common. Here the basal parts of the wings are of an intense metal-blue gloss: the submarginal row of spots on the forewings, however, is irregular, approaches the distal margin at the inner angle and is continued on the hindwings in the shape of obsolete internerval, diffuse spots before the border. Under surface finely, though brightly silvery irrorated. The female has a lighter blue base of the wings and only two white subapical spots of the forewings. — subbrunnescens Stgr. from Bolivia seems to be only an aberrative form being beneath, especially on the hindwings, scaled more in brown."

== Biology ==
The host plants of its caterpillar are Crotons.
