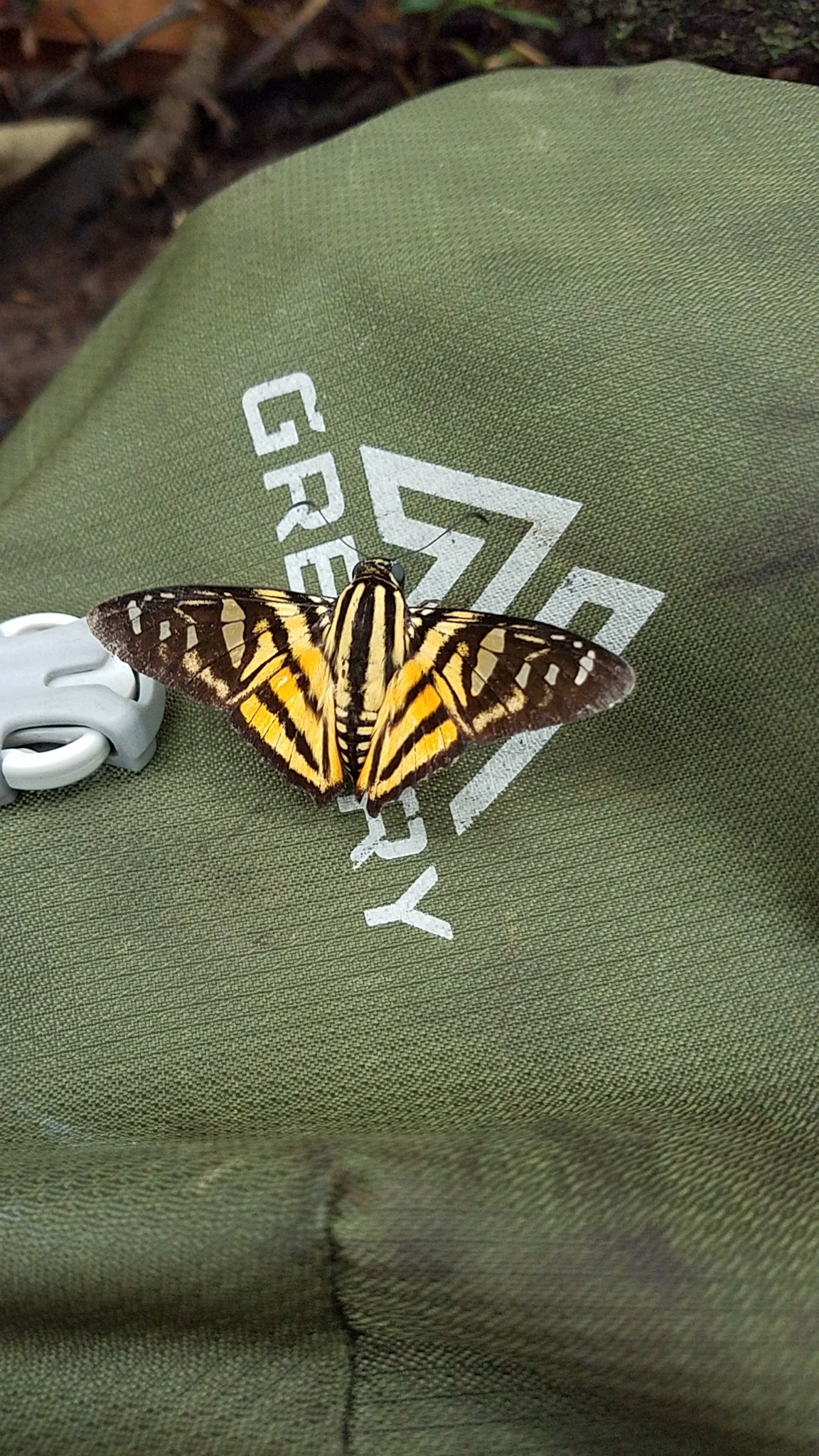

Scientific classification
- Kingdom: Animalia
- Phylum: Arthropoda
- Class: Insecta
- Order: Lepidoptera
- Family: Hesperiidae
- Genus: Croniades; Mabille, 1903
- Species: C. pieria

Binomial name
- Croniades pieria (Hewitson, 1857)

= Croniades =

Genus of butterflies

Croniades is a Neotropical genus of firetips in the family Hesperiidae. The genus is monotypic. The single species is Croniades pieria, found in Bolivia, Brazil and Guyane.
