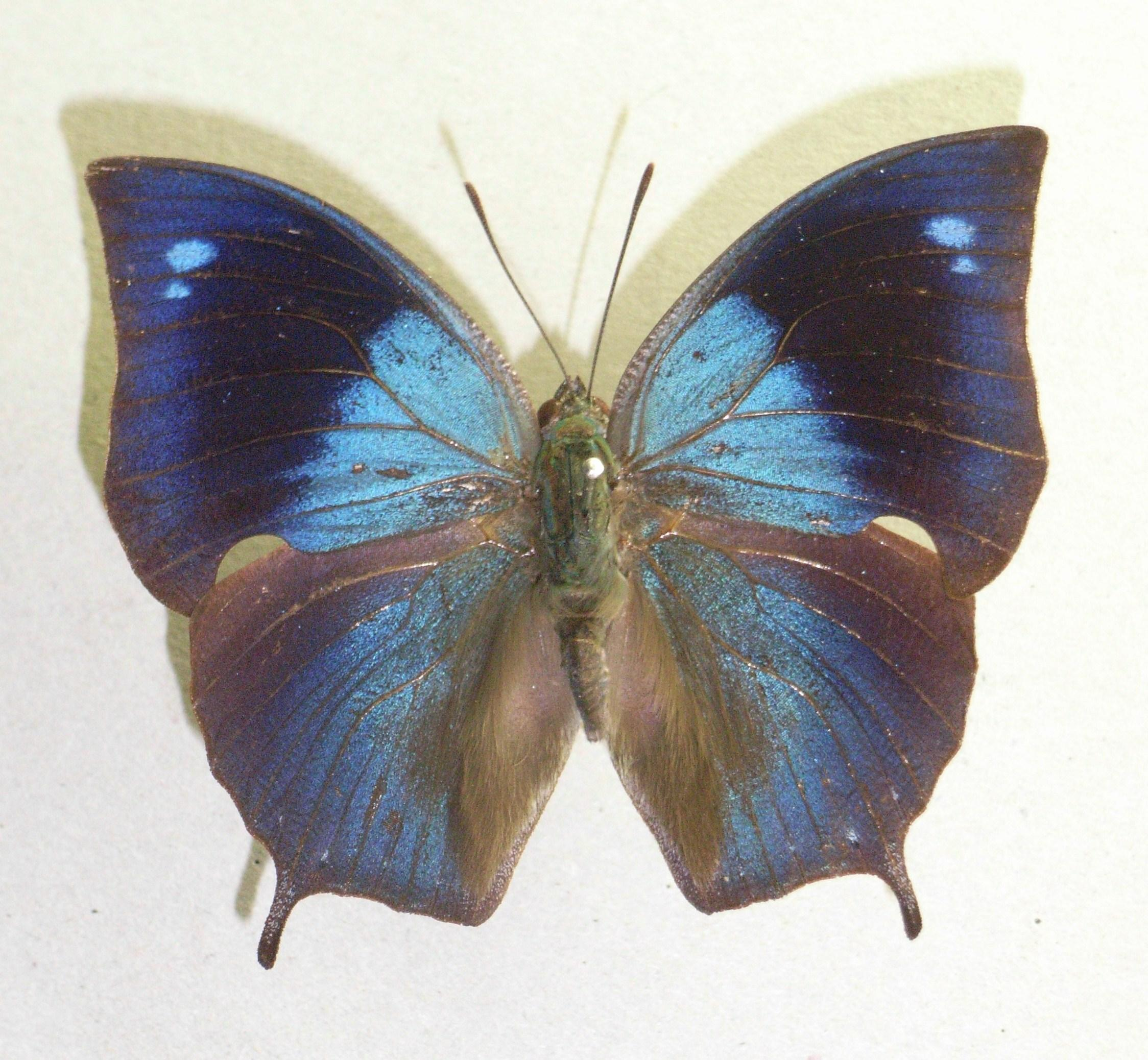

Scientific classification
- Kingdom: Animalia
- Phylum: Arthropoda
- Class: Insecta
- Order: Lepidoptera
- Family: Nymphalidae
- Tribe: Anaeini
- Genus: Memphis
- Species: M. moruus

Binomial name
- Memphis moruus (Fabricius, 1775)

Synonyms
- Memphis moruus (Fabricius, 1775); Papilio moruus Fabricius, 1775; Anaea morvus sic

= Memphis moruus =

Species of butterfly

Memphis moruus is a species of leafwing found in South America.

== Subspecies ==
- Memphis moruus moruus; present in Brazil and French Guiana.
- Memphis moruus boisduvali
- Memphis moruus leonila (Comstock, 1961); present in Ecuador.
- Memphis moruus morpheus (Staudinger, [1886]) present in Brazil.
- Memphis moruus phila (Druce, 1877) present in Colombia and Ecuador.
- Memphis moruus stheno (Prittwitz, 1865) present in Brazil.

== Description ==
Memphis moruus has forewings with a pointed apex and a concave outer edge, and hindwings with a tail. The upper part is metallic blue with a lighter basal part and a darker navy blue to brown distal part. The underside is light brown and simulates a dead leaf.

== Biology ==
The host plants of its caterpillar are Nectandra (Lauraceae) for Memphis moruus boisduvali.
