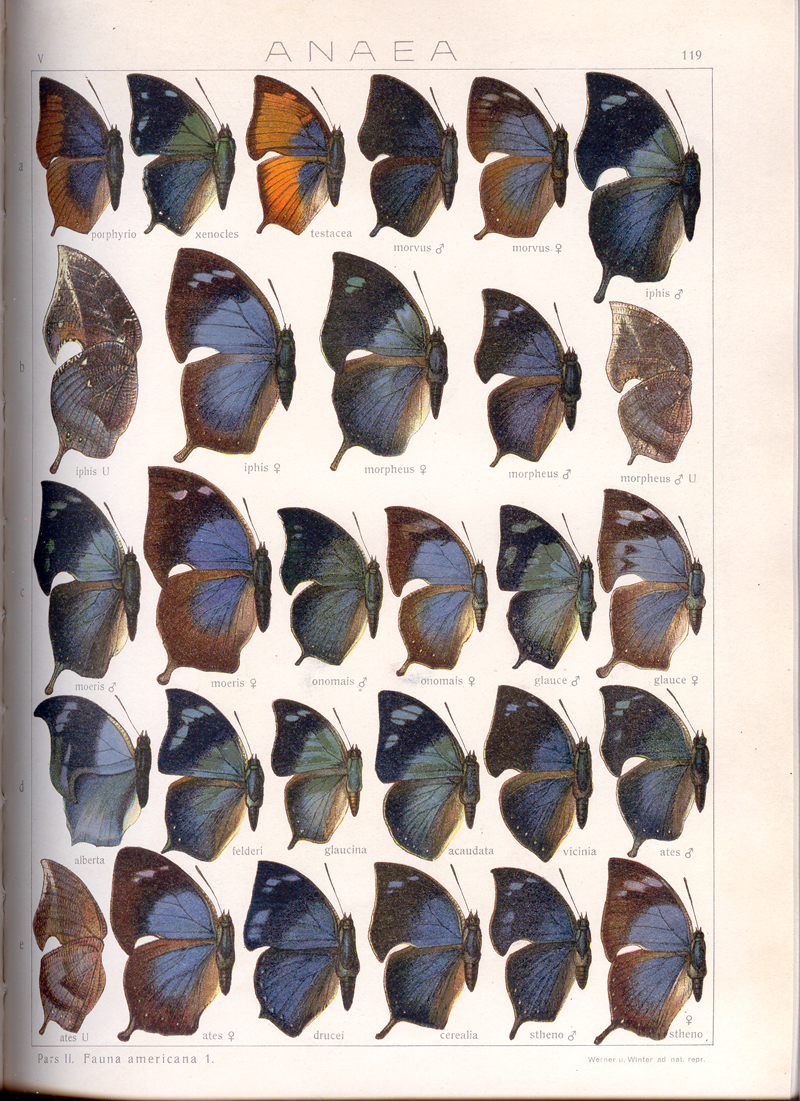
- as porphyrio a

Scientific classification
- Kingdom: Animalia
- Phylum: Arthropoda
- Class: Insecta
- Order: Lepidoptera
- Family: Nymphalidae
- Tribe: Anaeini
- Genus: Memphis
- Species: M. leonida

Binomial name
- Memphis leonida (Stoll, [1782])

Synonyms
- Papilio leonida Stoll, [1782]; Anaea leonida; Paphia porphyrio Bates, 1865

= Memphis leonida =

Species of butterfly

Memphis leonida is a species of leafwing found in South America.

== Subspecies ==
- Memphis leonida leonida present in Peru, Brazil and Suriname.
- Memphis leonida editha (Comstock, 1961) present in Brazil.

== Description ==
Memphis leonida is a butterfly with forewings with a humped costal edge, pointed apex, concave outer edge near the apex, hook-shaped inner angle, concave inner edge and hind wings each with a club-shaped tail. The upper side of the male's wings is more or less dark purple with a broad basal metallic blue suffusion, the female's is brown with a broad basal metallic blue suffusion.The underside is beige to bright orange and simulates a dead leaf. It is characterized by its peculiar colouring of the upper surface. It is very common in the forests of Peru.
