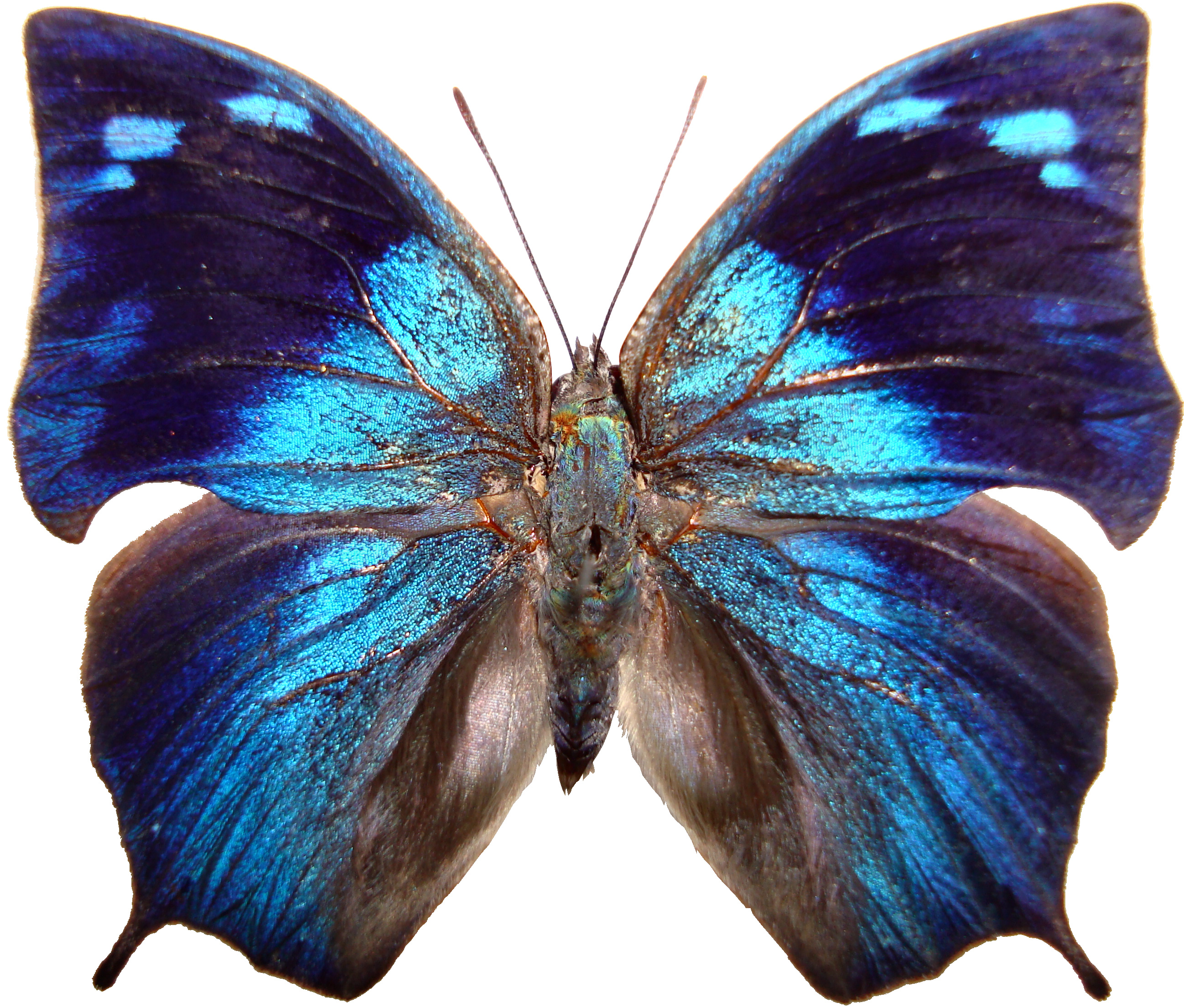

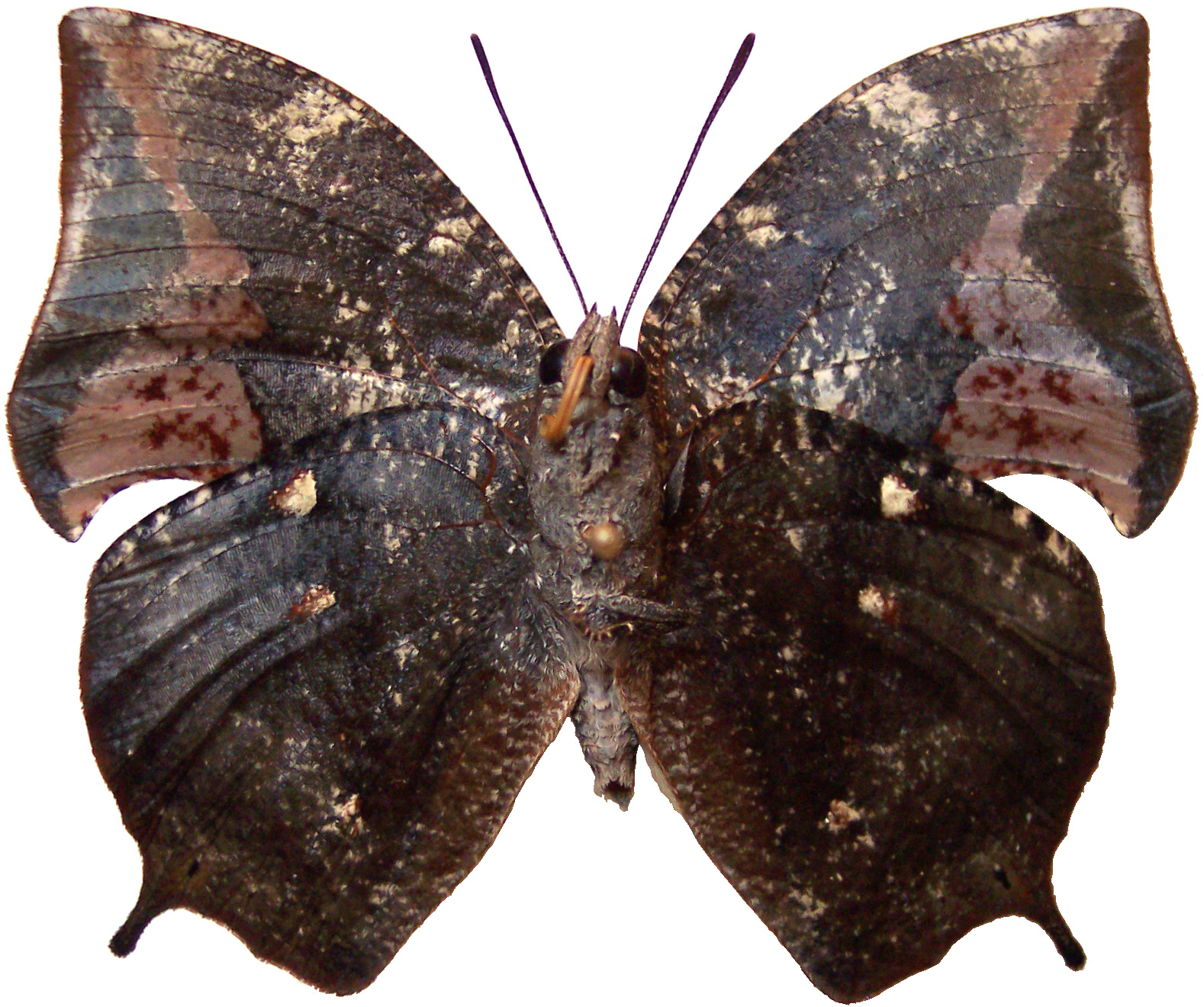

Scientific classification
- Kingdom: Animalia
- Phylum: Arthropoda
- Class: Insecta
- Order: Lepidoptera
- Family: Nymphalidae
- Genus: Memphis
- Species: M. acidalia

Binomial name
- Memphis acidalia (Hübner, [1819])

Synonyms
- Memphis arachne (Cramer, 1775); Papilio arachne Cramer, [1775] preocc.

= Memphis acidalia =

Species of butterfly

Memphis acidalia is a species of leafwing butterfly found in South America.

== Subspecies ==
- Memphis acidalia acidalia, present in Venezuela, Suriname, and Guyana.
- Memphis acidalia memphis (C. & R. Felder, 1867), present in Colombia, Ecuador, Venezuela, Bolivia, and Peru.
- Memphis acidalia victoria (Druce, 1877), present in Brazil.

== Description ==
Memphis acidalia is a butterfly with a wingspan of about 58 mm, with forewings with a humped costal edge, angular apex, hook-like inner angle, concave inner edge and hindwings with a tail. The upper part of the male is metallic blue with a lighter basal part, purplish reflections and a darker navy blue distal part. The upper part of the female is light brown with a metallic light blue basal part. The underside is light brown mottled and simulates a dead leaf. Seitz as A. arachne Cr Shape about like that of morvus, though we cannot ascertain from Cramer's figure whether the inner margin of the forewings is sinuate; nothing is said about this in the description. The hind-wings, except the narrow black border, are entirely green, the forewings green on the basal half, all the wings,however, are traversed by a moderately broad black subbasal band; a large green spot is in the apex of the forewing. The under surface is brown with whitish markings near the base of the hindwings, and all the wings are traversed by a rather broad bluish submarginal band; the under surface is, therefore, rather variegated.

== Biology ==
The host plants of its caterpillar are Euphorbiaceae. Memphis acidalia resides in the various types of rainforests.
