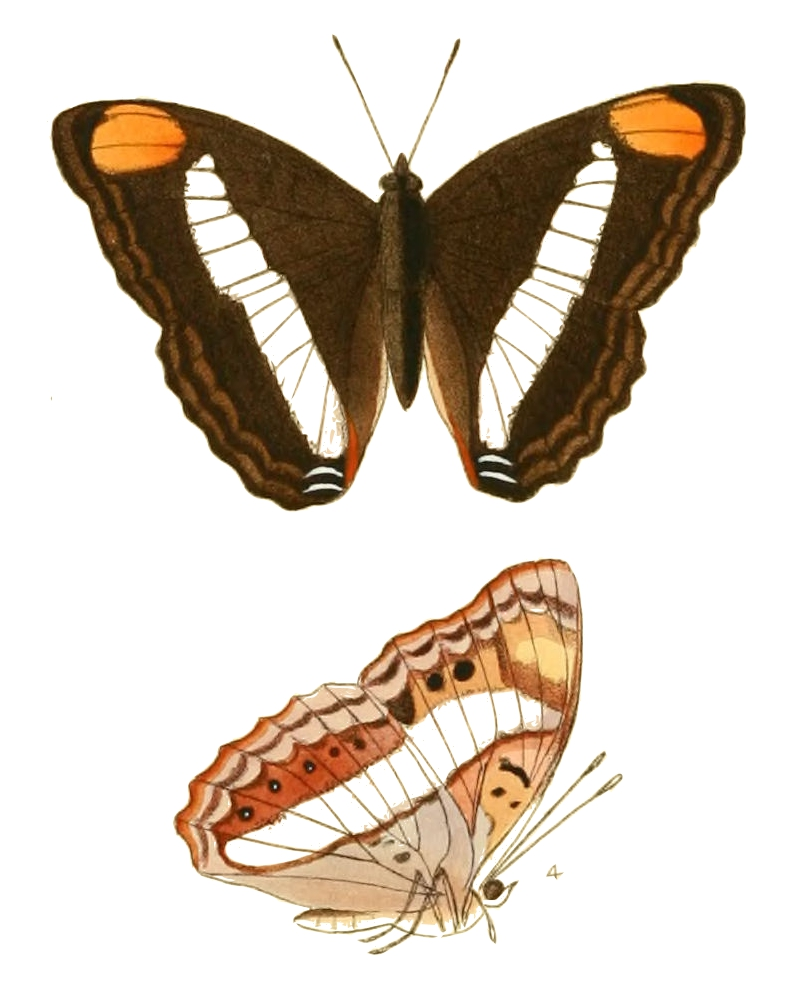
- Female

Scientific classification
- Kingdom: Animalia
- Phylum: Arthropoda
- Clade: Pancrustacea
- Class: Insecta
- Order: Lepidoptera
- Family: Nymphalidae
- Genus: Doxocopa
- Species: D. pavon

Binomial name
- Doxocopa pavon (Latreille, [1809])

Subspecies
- Doxocopa pavon pavon (Latreille, [1809]); Doxocopa pavon theodora (Lucas, 1857)

Synonyms
- Apatura pavonii Hew. ex. Butt., 1874; Apatura theodora Lucas, 1857; Chlorippe mentas Boisduval, 1870; Chlorippe pavonii Godman & Salvin, [1884]; Nymphalis pavon Latreille, [1809]; Chlorippe pavon cuellinia Fruhstorfer, 1907; Chlorippe pavon inumbratus Fruhstorfer, 1907; Chlorippe pavon subtuniformis Röber, 1916

= Doxocopa pavon =

Pavon emperor

Species of butterfly

Doxocopa pavon, the Pavon emperor or Pavon, is a species of butterfly in the family Nymphalidae. They can be found from Paraguay in South America up to Texas in the southern United States. They are generally brown in their overall coloration, with two bands of white straddling the middle of the upper surfaces of the wings, and a patch of orange on the tips of their forewings. The upper surfaces of the wings of the males are overlaid by an iridescent blue-purple sheen. The females of the species closely resemble members of the unrelated genus Adelpha.

The larvae of Doxocopa pavon feed on the leaves of hackberries, while the adults are primarily nectar-feeders.

== Taxonomy ==
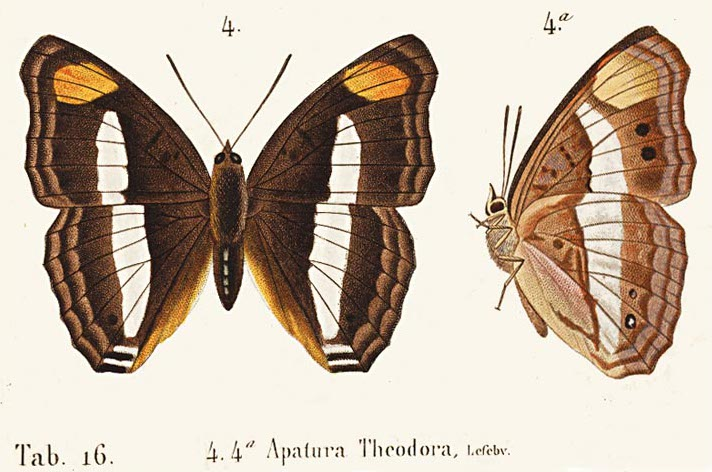
Original illustrations of a female Doxocopa pavon theodora by Hippolyte Lucas (1857)

Doxocopa pavon is classified under the genus Doxocopa of the subfamily Apaturinae (emperors) in the brush-footed butterfly family Nymphalidae. It was originally described as Nymphalis pavon by the French zoologist Pierre André Latreille in 1809. The type specimen was collected from Loja, Ecuador.

Doxocopa pavon is usually divided into two subspecies: Doxocopa pavon theodora and the nominal subspecies Doxocopa pavon pavon. D. p. theodora was originally described by the French entomologist Hippolyte Lucas in 1857 as Apatura theodora. Its type specimen was collected from Fernardina de Jagua, Cuba (now the city of Cienfuegos).

The subspecies was also collected by the French lepidopterist Jean Baptiste Boisduval in 1870 and described as the species Chlorippe mentas. Several other authors also described it under other names. The German entomologist Hans Fruhstorfer described it as [Chlorippe] pavon inumbratus and [Chlorippe] pavon cuellinia in 1907, with specimens collected from Paraguay and Mexico respectively. And in 1916, the German entomologist Julius Röber also named it [Chlorippe] pavon subtuniformis. The latter names are now considered synonyms and are invalid.

Doxocopa pavon are commonly known as the Pavon emperor, or simply Pavon.

== Description ==
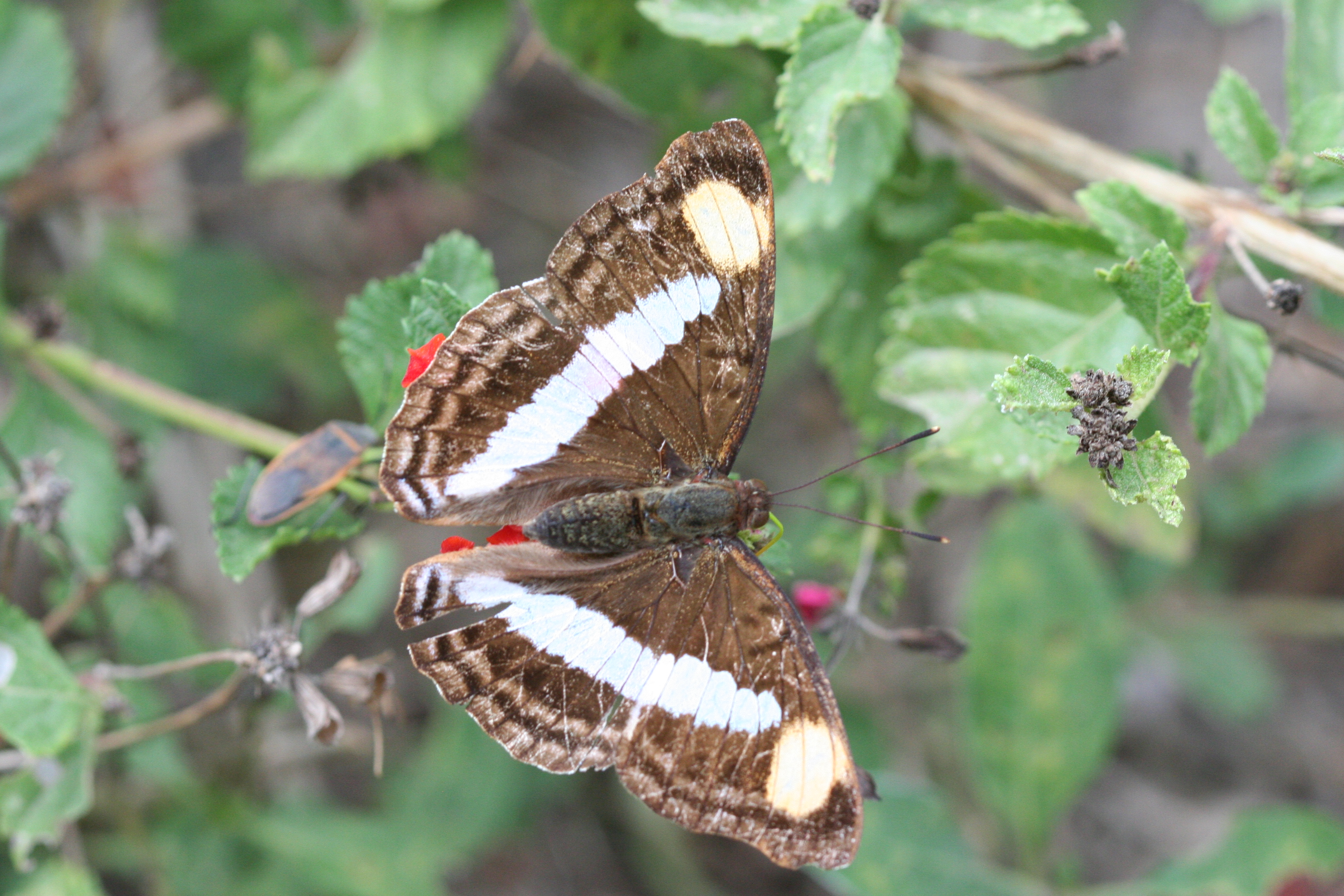
A female from Mission, Texas

Doxocopa pavon have wingspans between 5.6 to 6.9 cm (2.2 to 2.7 in). They are sexually dimorphic, having two distinct forms for the male and female. Both sexes have a small orange patch on the tips of their forewings.

The upper surfaces of the wings of the male of the species are predominantly brown overlaid with a vividly iridescent bluish purple. In the middle of the upper surfaces of both forewings and hindwings is a white band that is usually only barely visible. The undersides of the wings are a pale brown. At the tip of the forewing is a small orange patch.

The female of the species is also predominantly brown on the upper surfaces of the wings, but it lacks the purple coloration of the males. It also has a band of white in the middle of the upper surfaces of both forewings and hindwings. Unlike in the male, this band is very distinct and broad, though it does not touch the front edge of the forewings.

The species closely resembles the silver emperor (Doxocopa laure) but differs in that the undersides of the wings of D. laure are covered in a silvery sheen, while it is a plain pale brown in D. pavon. Both sexes also lack the pointed tips in the hindwings which is present in D. laure. The males of D. laure also have extended forewings with squarish tips and a much larger orange patch than in D. pavon.

The females of D. pavon also closely resemble both sexes of some species of the unrelated genus Adelpha (sisters). Particularly the band-celled sister (Adelpha fessonia), pointed sister (Adelpha iphiclus), Celerio sister (Adelpha serpa), Bredow's sister (Adelpha bredowii), Arizona sister (Adelpha eulalia), and the California sister (Adelpha californica). They can be distinguished from A. fessonia in that the white bands in D. pavon never reach the front edge of their forewings. While the white bands in A. bredowii, A. californica, and A. eulalia are broken into spots on the forward edge of their forewings. Adelpha and Doxocopa are thought to be part of a large mimicry complex, as some members of Adelpha are unpalatable to predators.

== Distribution and habitat ==
This species occurs from Bolivia and Paraguay in South America to northern Mexico in North America. At times, it can also be found in the lower Rio Grande Valley of Texas. The subspecies D. p. theodora has a more limited range, being found in Mexico, Central America, and the Caribbean.

They are generally found in tropical and subtropical forests (including rainforests) at altitudes of about 200 to 1,000 m (660 to 3,280 ft) above sea level.

== Life cycle and ecology ==
The larvae of D. pavon are green with yellow-white dots running along their sides, and an indistinct series of yellow-white blotches on the upper surface. The body tapers strongly towards a pointed tail. The head is green with black eyes and black mandibles. Two white and black stripes on the front also extend up towards the two long, forward-projecting horns. The horns are green with a forked black tip. The larvae feed on the leaves of hackberries (genus Celtis). In the United States, they are usually found on the desert hackberry (Celtis pallida), while in Mexico they can be found on the iguana hackberry (Celtis iguanaea).

The chrysalis is camouflaged as a leaf, similar to that of other members of the subfamily. It is greenish in color, strongly arched, flattened laterally and with ridges running along the abdomen. The adults feed on nectar; including those from the flowers of bocotes (genus Cordia) and rushfoils (genus Croton). They can also be commonly found in sunlit areas in forests engaging in mud-puddling on moist mineral-laden soil or rock, rotting fruit, carrion, or bird droppings. The males are the most often encountered, as they have a habit of perching on trees in full sunlight (especially at midday) waiting for females. Females, however, are more rarely seen as they spend most of their time in the forest canopy.

== Conservation ==
The species is considered secure globally (G5) by NatureServe, though it might be rare near the boundaries of its range.

In Guatemala, the species is listed under the country's local wildlife red list due to low-level hunting by butterfly collectors (averaging at three specimens a month).

== See also ==
- Doxocopa agathina, the Agathina emperor
- Doxocopa laurentia, the turquoise emperor
