= Dannatt =

Dannatt is a surname. Notable people with the surname include:

- Adrian Dannatt, artist, art critic and journalist
- Andy Dannatt, British rugby player
- Richard Dannatt, British Army general and chief of the General Staff
- Trevor Dannatt, English architect
- Walter Dannatt, English entomologist

== See also ==
- Dannatt plates, thick sheets made of electrical conductors, usually copper, positioned around an AC magnetic circuit to help guide magnetic flux
- Dannatt's tiger, a species of butterfly
