= Walter Dannatt =

English entomologist (1863–1940)

Walter Dannatt (1863–21 February 1940) was an English entomologist who specialised in Lepidoptera, amassing a collection of over 18,000 specimens, principally from Jamaica and the Amazon. Dannatt was a natural history dealer and a member of the Entomological Society of London.

He lived in Lee and in Blackheath, both in southeast London (the Dannatt family ran a grocery business in Blackheath). His sister Annie M. Dannatt, who attended the Blackheath School of Art, illustrated butterflies from his collection. Painter George Dannatt and architect Trevor Dannatt were nephews.

== Publications ==
- Dannatt, W., 1904. Descriptions of three new butterflies. The Entomologist 37: 173–174, pl. 7. The three species described are :- Delias hempeli, Doxocopa linda godmani and Parantica dannatti - Dannatt's tiger.
