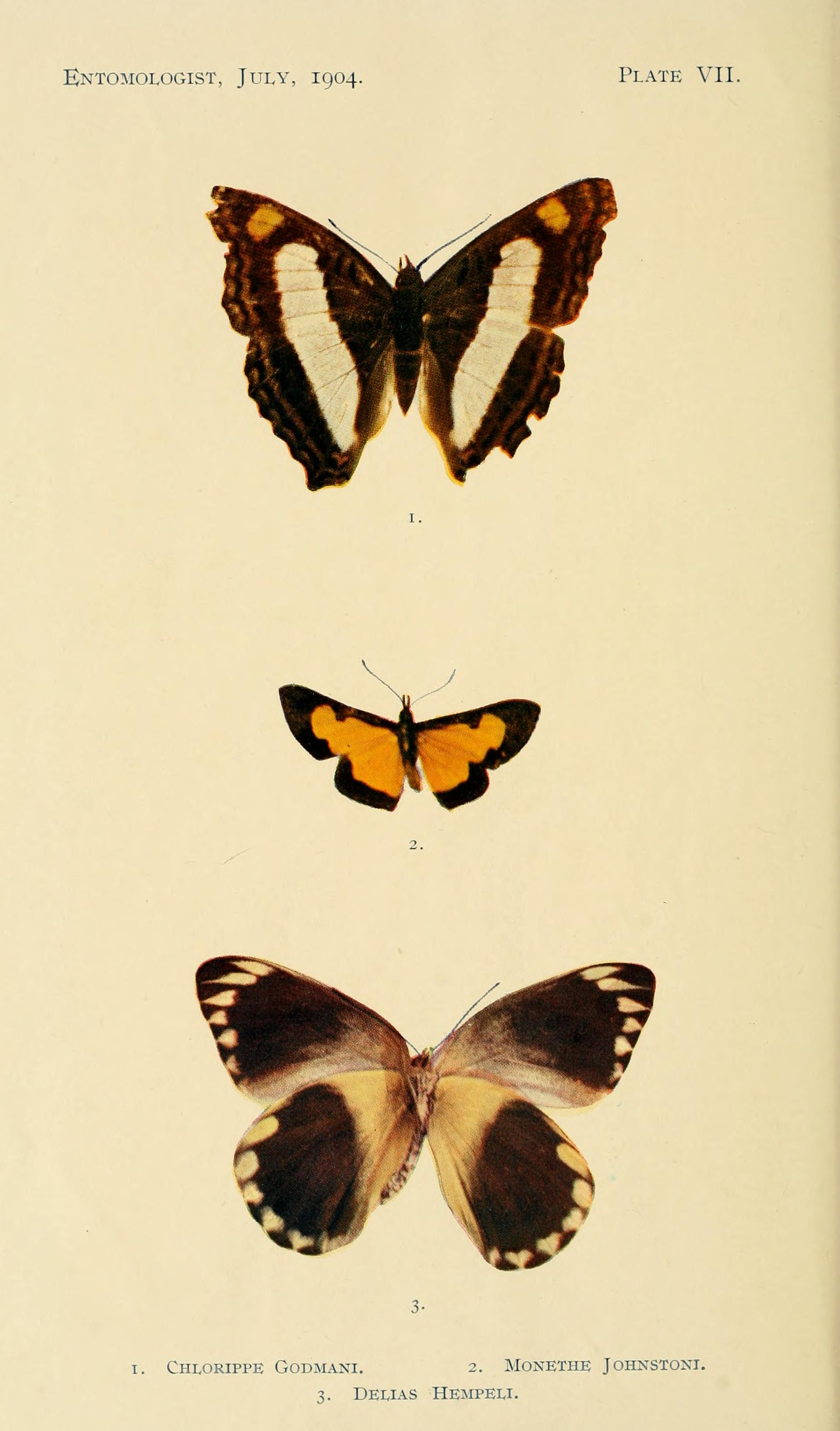
- Illustration in The Entomologist.

Scientific classification
- Kingdom: Animalia
- Phylum: Arthropoda
- Class: Insecta
- Order: Lepidoptera
- Family: Pieridae
- Genus: Delias
- Species: D. hempeli

Binomial name
- Delias hempeli Dannatt, 1904

= Delias hempeli =

Species of butterfly

Delias hempeli is a butterfly in the family Pieridae. It was described by Walter Dannatt as endemic to Halmahera in the Moluccas.

== Description ==
Delius HEMPELI, sp. n. (Pl. VII. fig. 3, under side). Male. Chalky white, with black markings. Fore wings have the lower discocellular black, and a broad black patch beyond it, extending from just below the costa to near the outer margin, terminating at the second vein; its inner edge is diffuse, and from its outer edge the black is continued along the veins, forming five elongated white spots on the outer margin. Hind wings white, powdered beyond the middle with greyish, with four cuneiform spots faintly distinguished. Under side fore wings similar to upper side, but the black has a brownish tinge, and is diffused more or less over the whole of the area, the basal and inner margin being yellow suffused with black. Hind wings black, basal area yellow, extending along the inner margin, where it is powdered with black; marginal spots yellow, the upper two longer than the others. The under side of this species (a male) most nearly resembles the female of Delias candida but the fore wings are much lighter, and the spots on under side of hind wings are reddish and of a different form. Expanse, 73 mm.

Hab. Gilolo. I have much pleasure in naming this species after an American friend, Mr. Adolph Hempel. ]

== Taxonomy ==
Delias hempeli is a member of the nysa species group.
