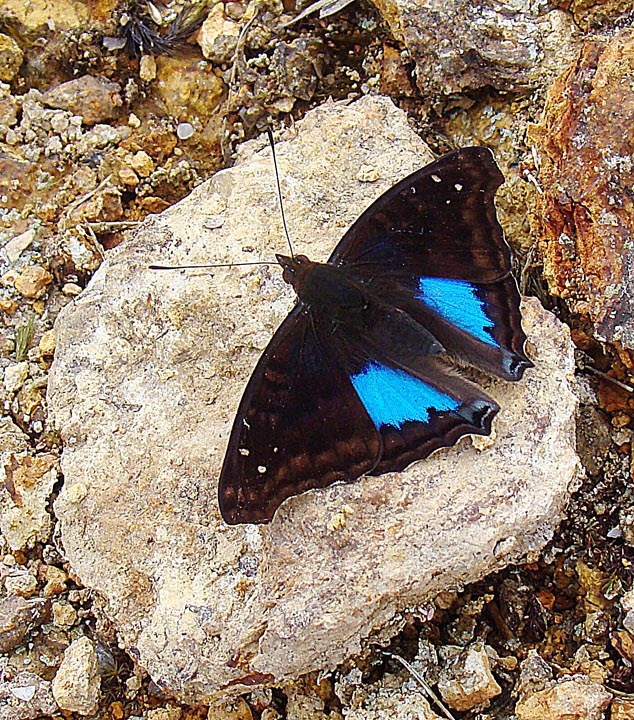
- Male

Scientific classification
- Domain: Eukaryota
- Kingdom: Animalia
- Phylum: Arthropoda
- Class: Insecta
- Order: Lepidoptera
- Family: Nymphalidae
- Genus: Doxocopa
- Species: D. cyane

Binomial name
- Doxocopa cyane (Latreille, 1813)

Synonyms
- List: Nymphalis cyane Latreille, [1813]; Nymphalis cyanippe Godart, [1824]; Apatura lucasii Doubleday, [1849]; Apatura moritziana C. & R. Felder, 1867; Apatura lucasii boliviana Oberthür, 1914; Chlorippe cyane reducta Röber, 1916; Chlorippe burmeisteri Godman & Salvin, [1884]; Chlorippe burmeisteri f. verdemicans Hayward, 1931; Apatura lucasii f. ornata Oberthür, 1914; Doxocopa cyane boliviana f. ornatina Bryk, 1938

= Doxocopa cyane =

Species of butterfly

Doxocopa cyane, the Mexican emperor or cyan emperor, is a species of butterfly of the family Nymphalidae.

== Subspecies ==
Subspecies include:

- Doxocopa cyane burmeisteri (Godman & Salvin, 1884) (Argentina)
- Doxocopa cyane cyane (Latreille, 1813) (Peru, Venezuela, Bolivia)
- Doxocopa cyane mexicana Bryk, 1953 (Mexico, Colombia)
- Doxocopa cyane vespertina Lamas, 1999 (Peru)

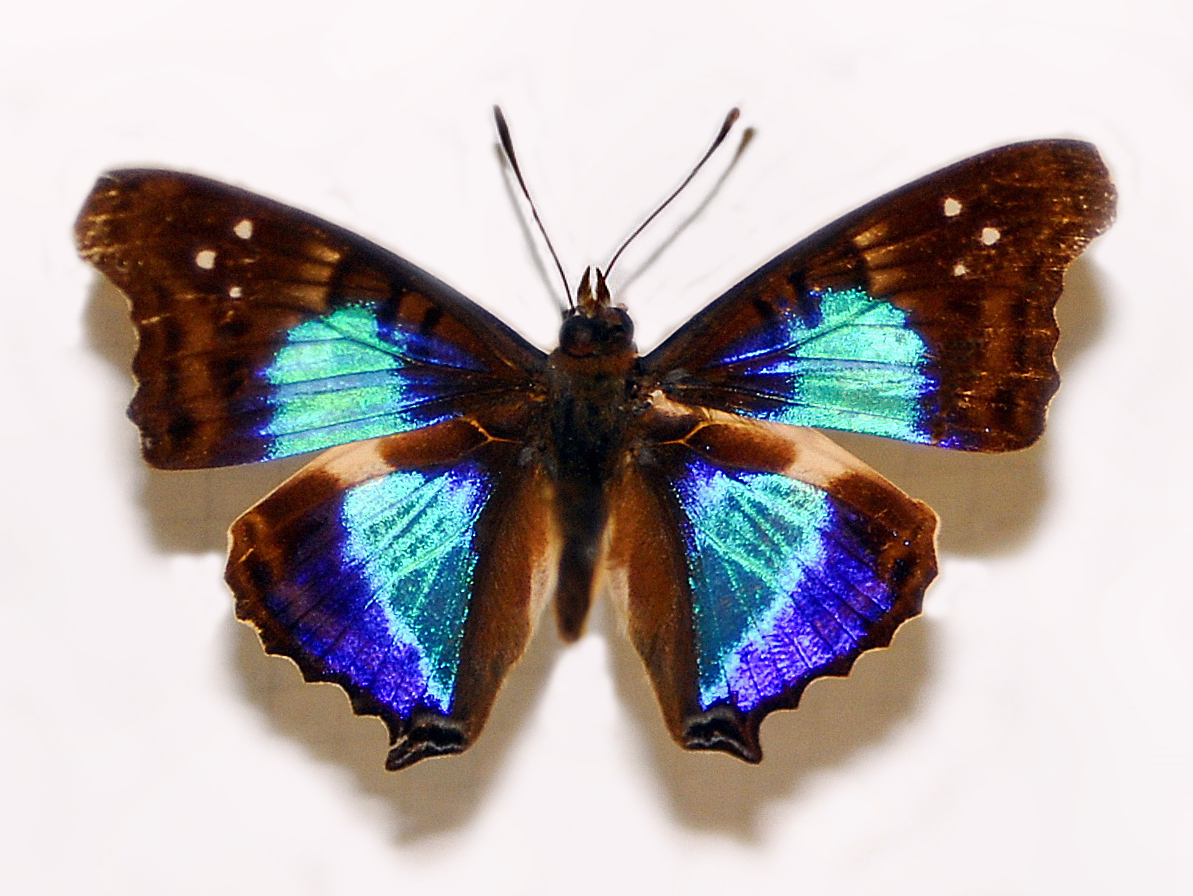
Male museum specimen

== Distribution ==
This species is present in Peru, Venezuela, Bolivia, Argentina, Mexico and Colombia.

== Habitat ==
These butterflies inhabit cloudforest at elevations between about 600–1,800 metres (2,000–5,900 ft) above sea level.

== Description ==
Doxocopa cyane has a wingspan of about 55 millimetres (2.2 in). The color of the wings varies by sex. Males show a brilliant electric-blue iridescence on the upperside of the wings, while the wings of the females lack this iridescence. Females have usually a brown ground color with wide longitudinal bands of orange and white on forewings and hindwings.

== Biology ==
Larvae feed on Celtis spinosa. Males are solitary and territorial. They usually visit wet muddy patches and feed on rotting fruits, dung or carrion. Females mainly inhabit the forest canopy.
