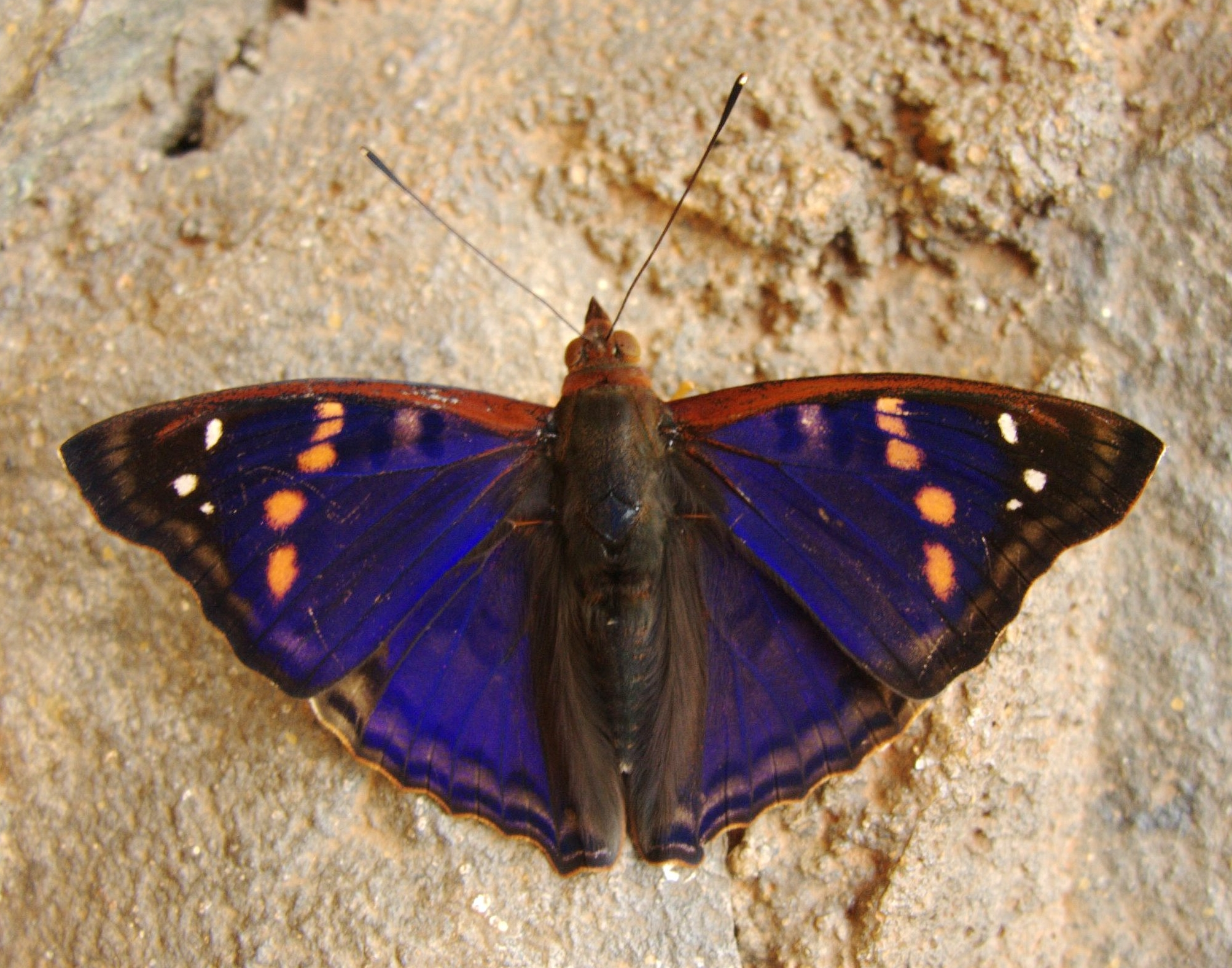
- Doxocopa agathina male
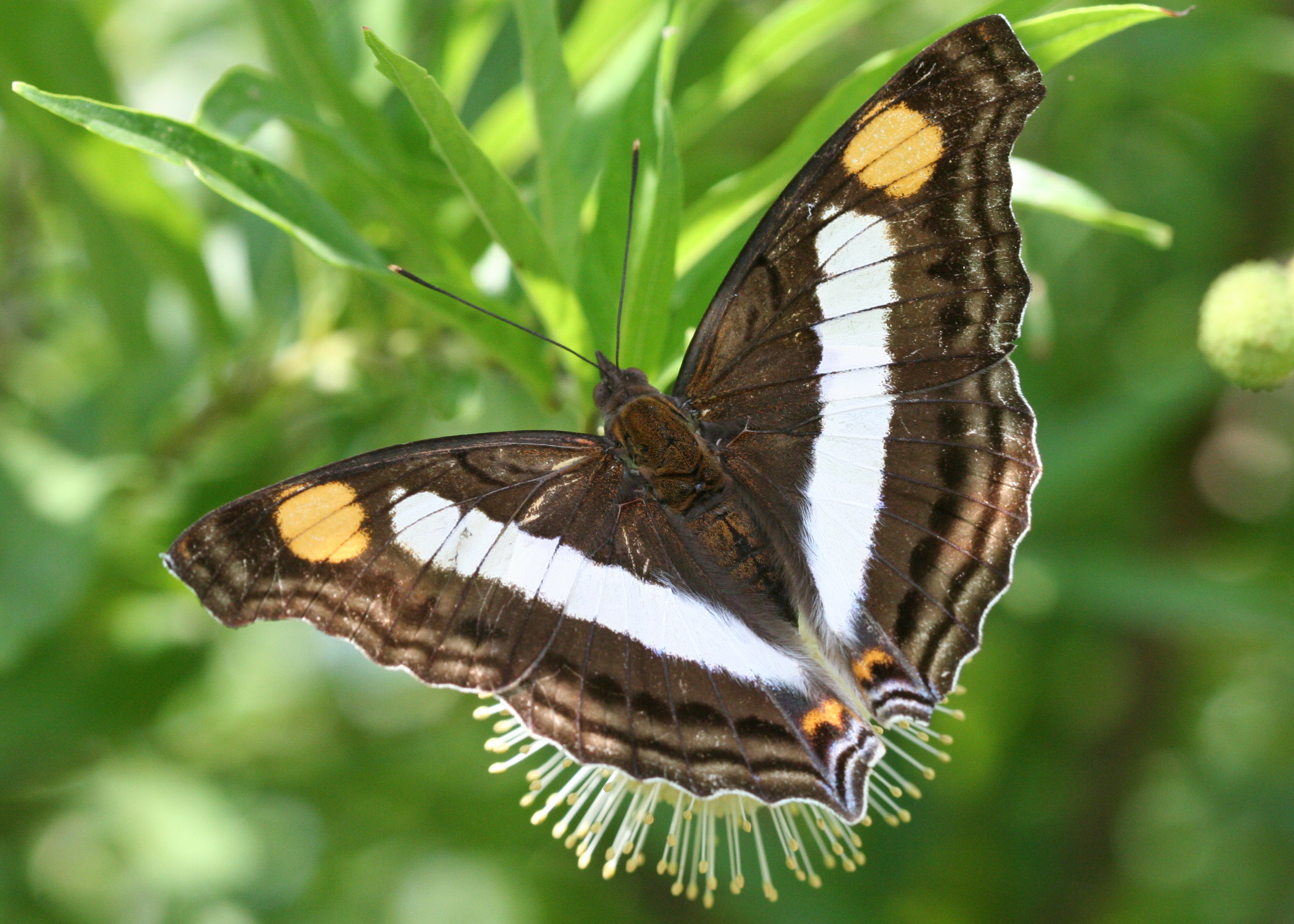
- Doxocopa laurentia female

Scientific classification
- Domain: Eukaryota
- Kingdom: Animalia
- Phylum: Arthropoda
- Class: Insecta
- Order: Lepidoptera
- Family: Nymphalidae
- Subfamily: Apaturinae
- Genus: Doxocopa; Hübner, 1819

= Doxocopa =

Genus of brush-footed butterflies

Doxocopa is a genus of Neotropical butterflies in the family Nymphalidae, subfamily Apaturinae. It includes the following species:

- Doxocopa agathina (Cramer, [1777]) - Agathina emperor
- Doxocopa burmeisteri (Godman & Salvin, [1884])
- Doxocopa callianira (Ménétriés, 1855)
- Doxocopa clothilda (C. Felder & R. Felder, [1867])
- Doxocopa cyane (Latreille, [1813])
- Doxocopa elis (C. Felder & R. Felder, 1861)
- Doxocopa excelsa (Gillott, 1927)
- Doxocopa kallina (Staudinger, 1886)
- Doxocopa lavinia (Butler, 1866)
- Doxocopa laure (Drury, [1773]) - silver emperor
- Doxocopa laurentia (Godart, [1824])
- Doxocopa linda (C. Felder & R. Felder, 1862) - Linda emperor
- Doxocopa pavon (Latreille, [1809]) - Pavon emperor
- Doxocopa plesaurina (Butler & H. Druce, 1872)
- Doxocopa seraphina (Hübner, [1825])
- Doxocopa zalmunna (Butler, 1869)
- Doxocopa zunilda (Godart, [1824])

== Gallery ==
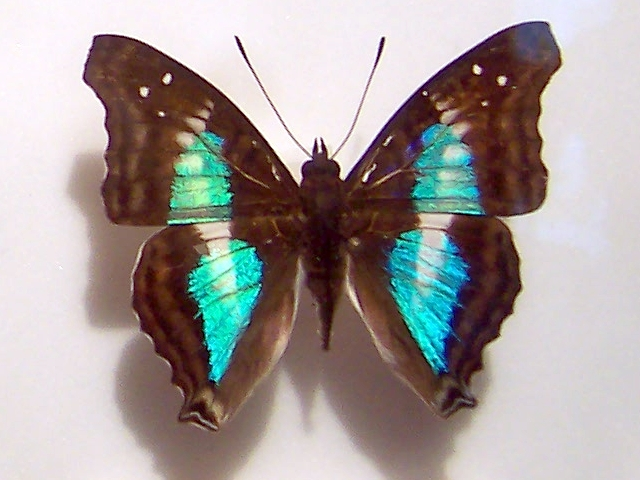
D. lavinia male

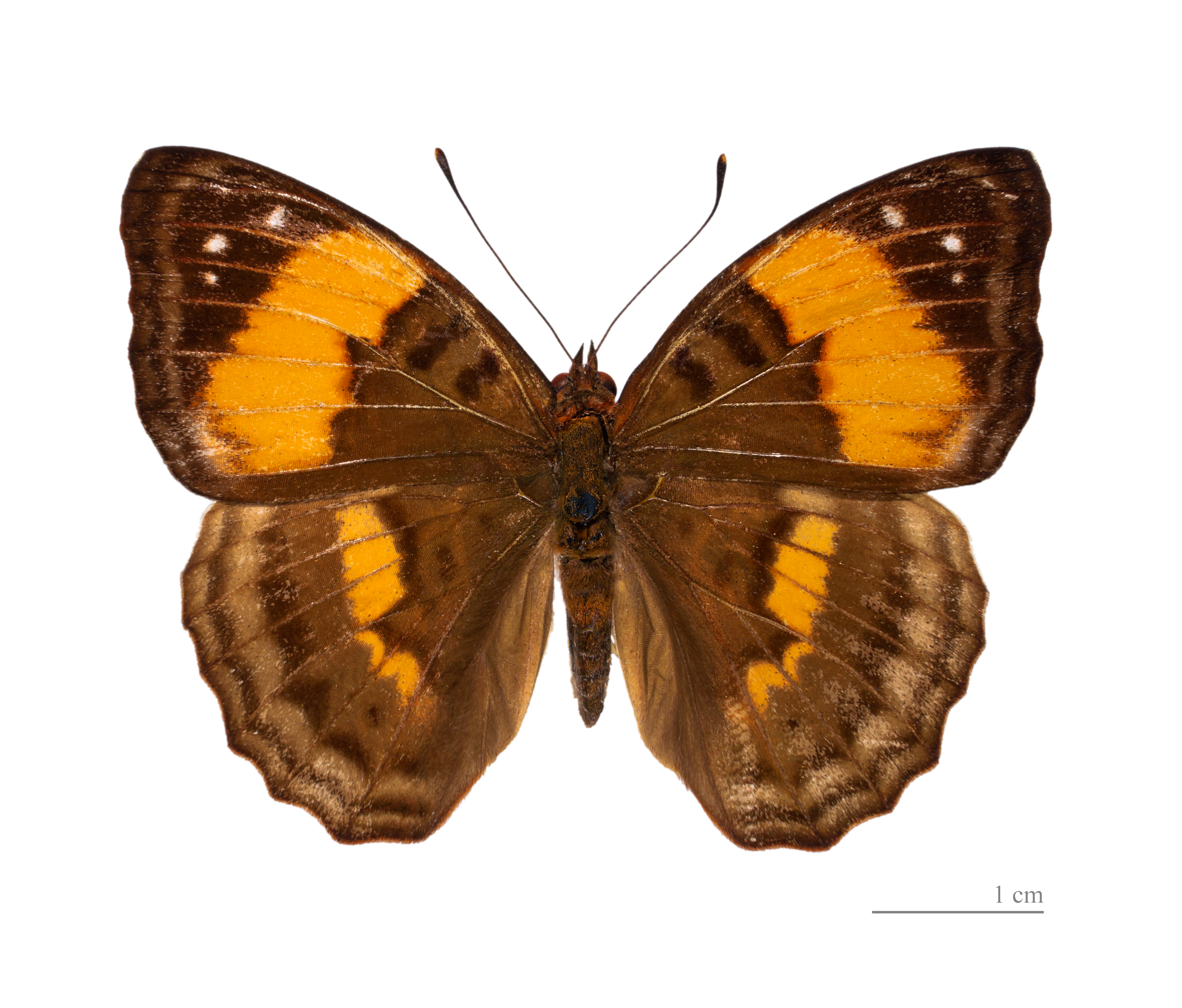
D. agathina female

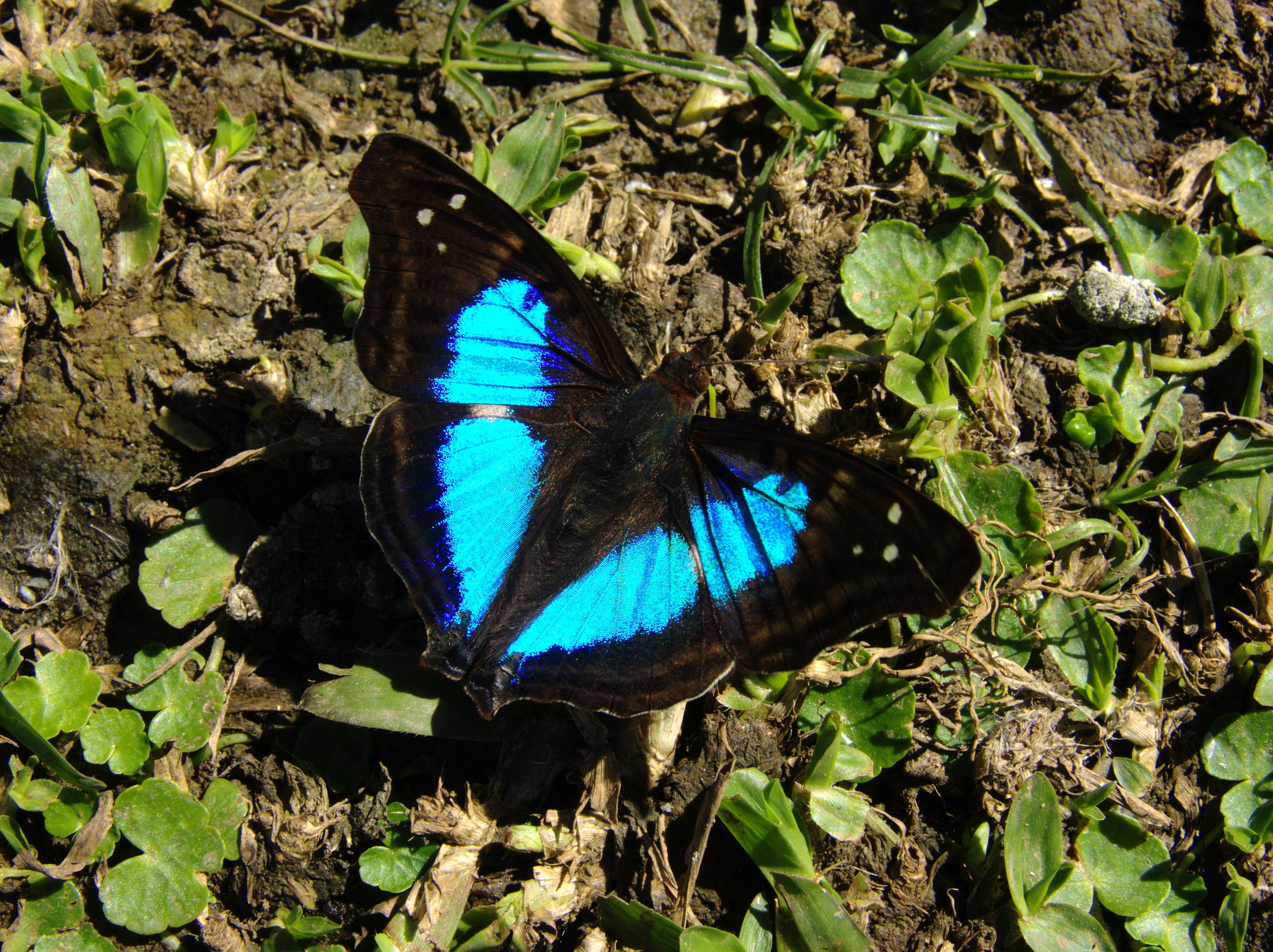
D. laurentia male

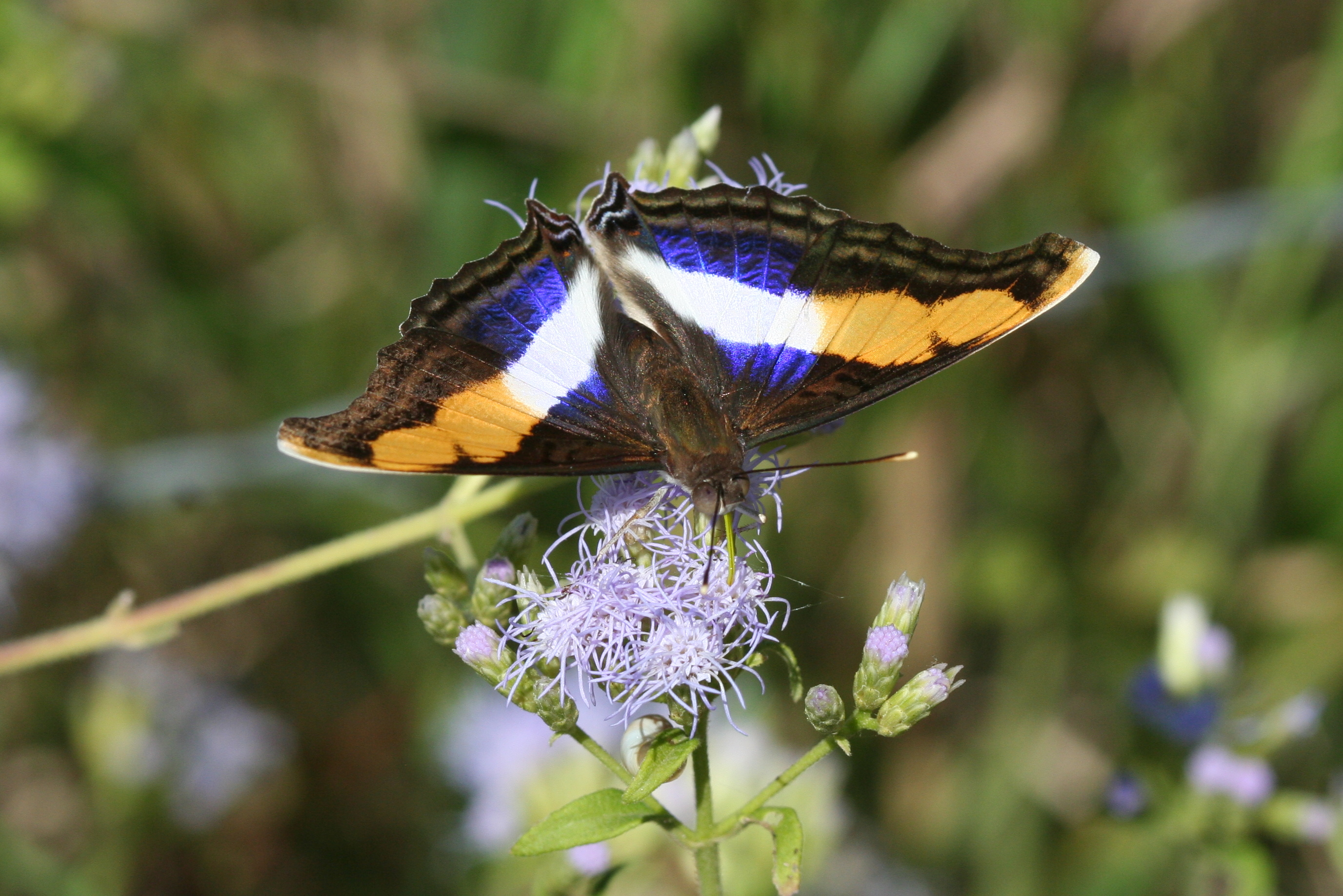
D. laure male

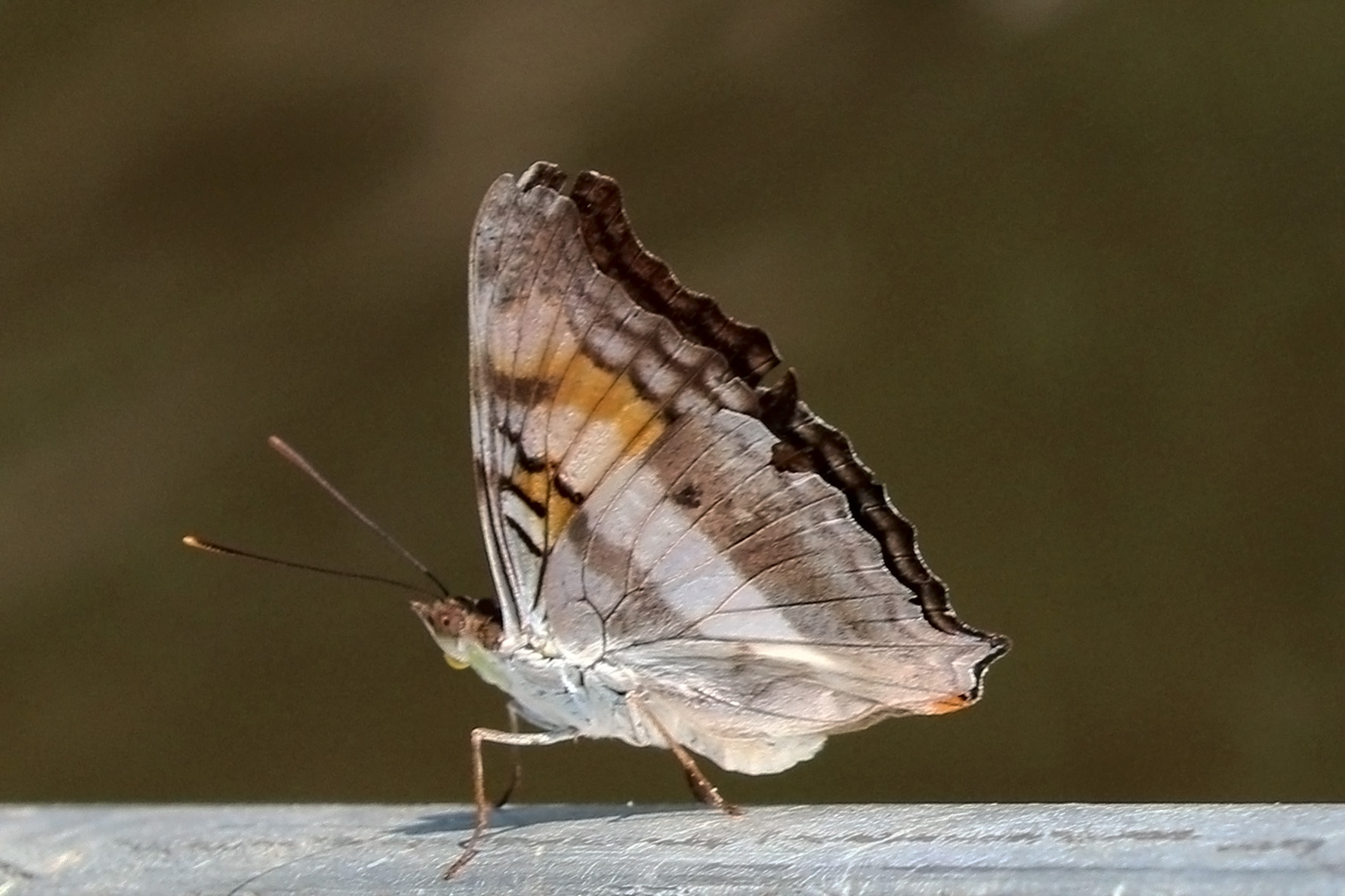
D. linda

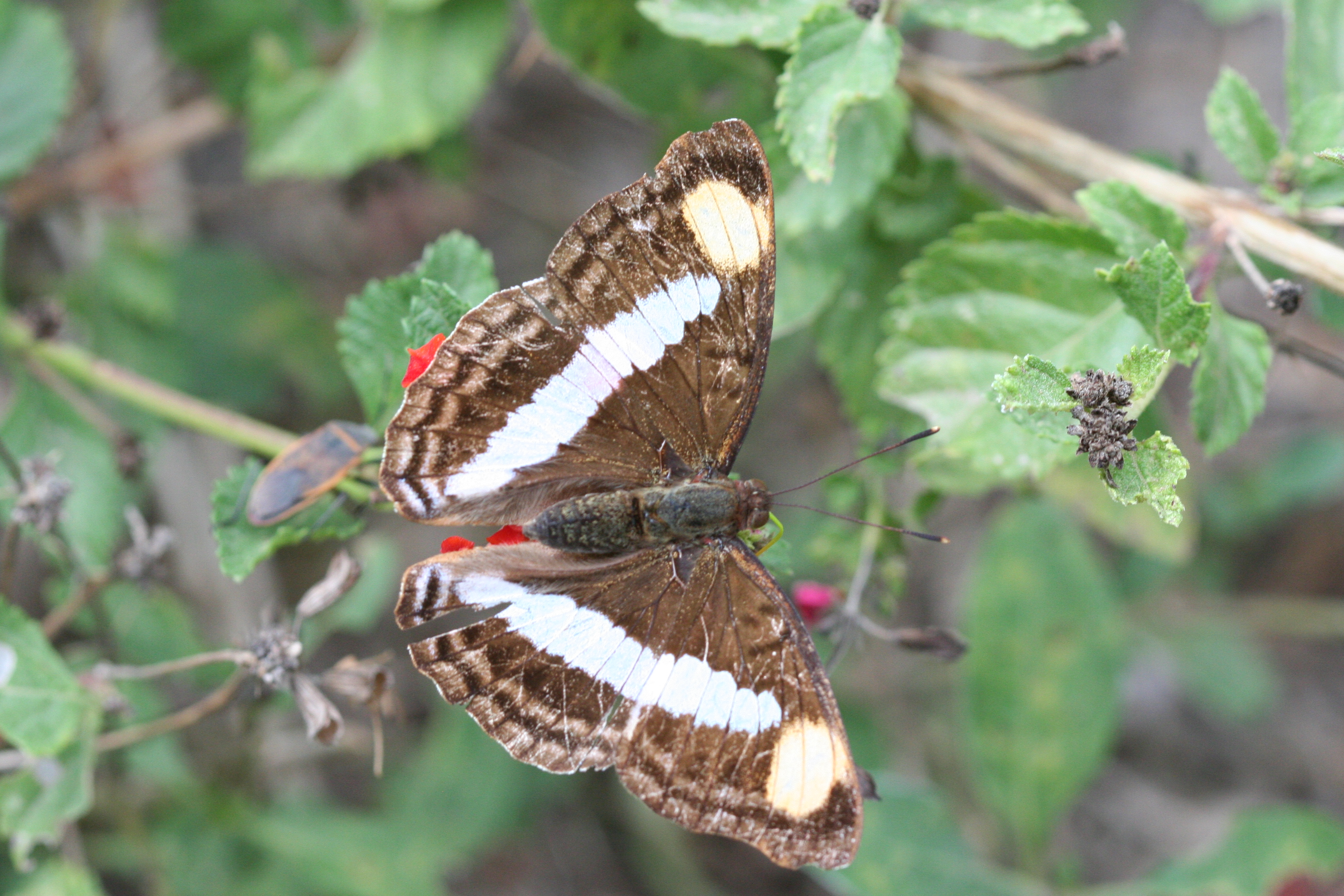
D. pavon female

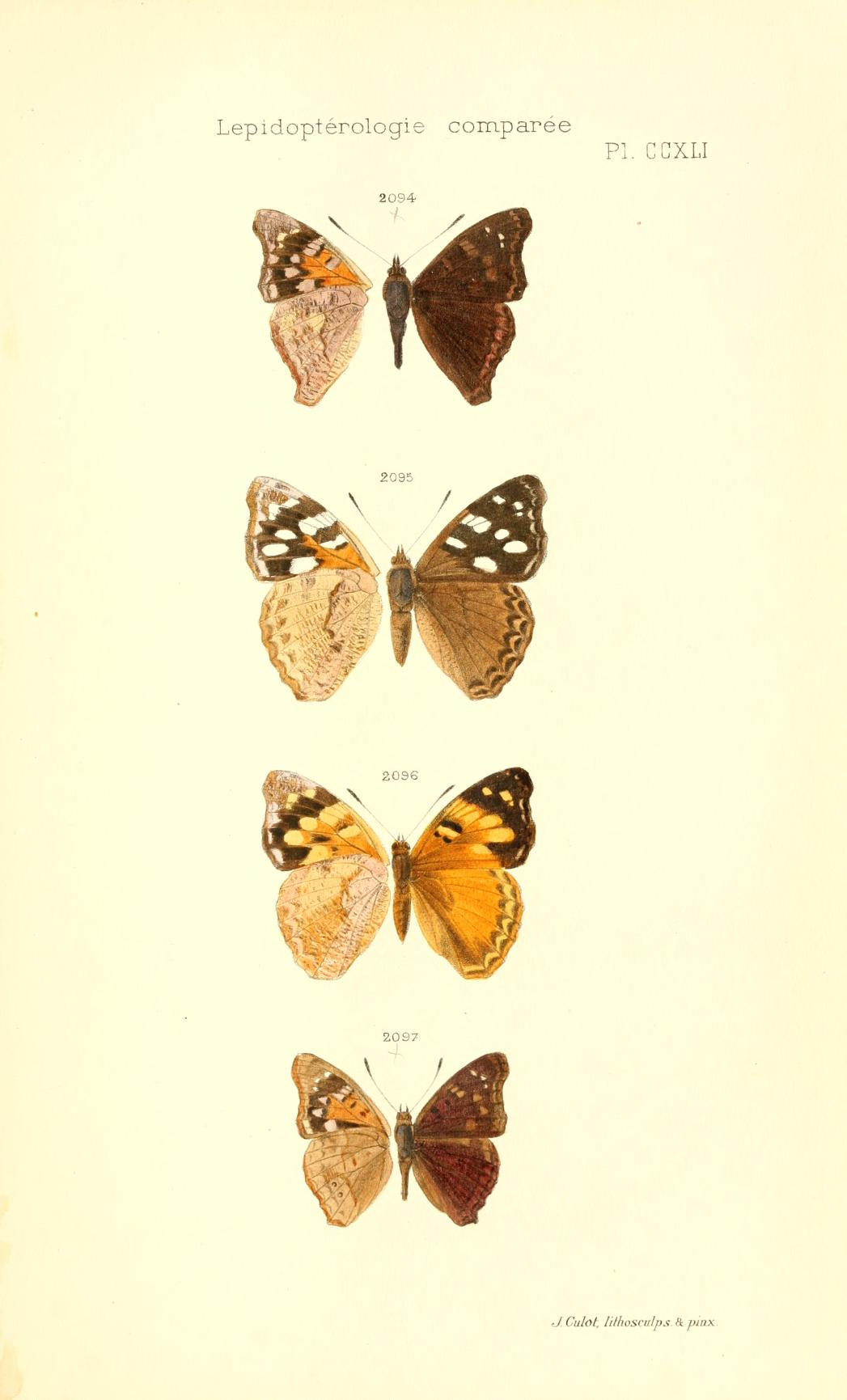
D. zalmunna and D. zunilda

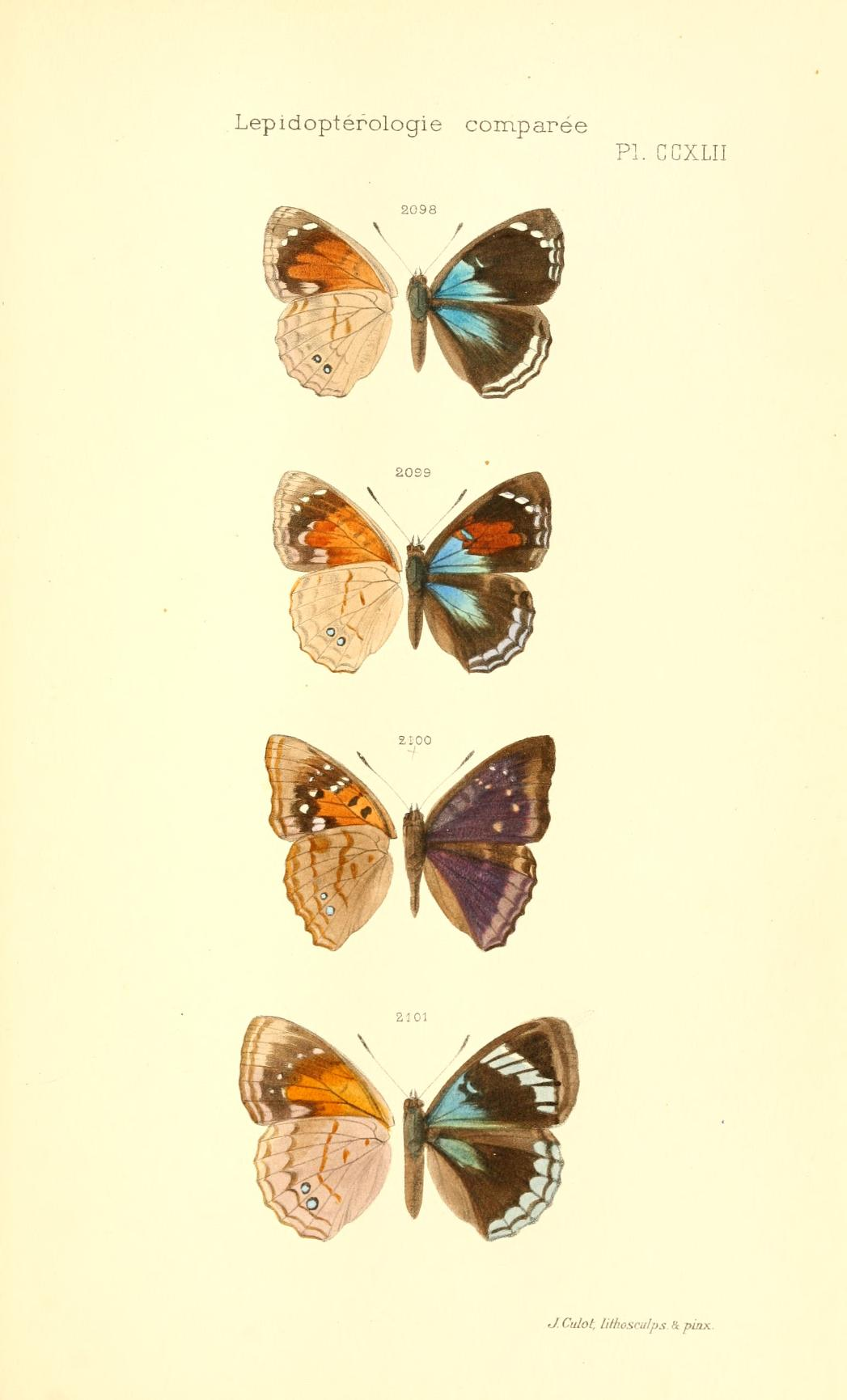
D. zunilda

== See also ==
- Adelpha - a genus of butterflies which closely resemble the females of most species of Doxocopa
