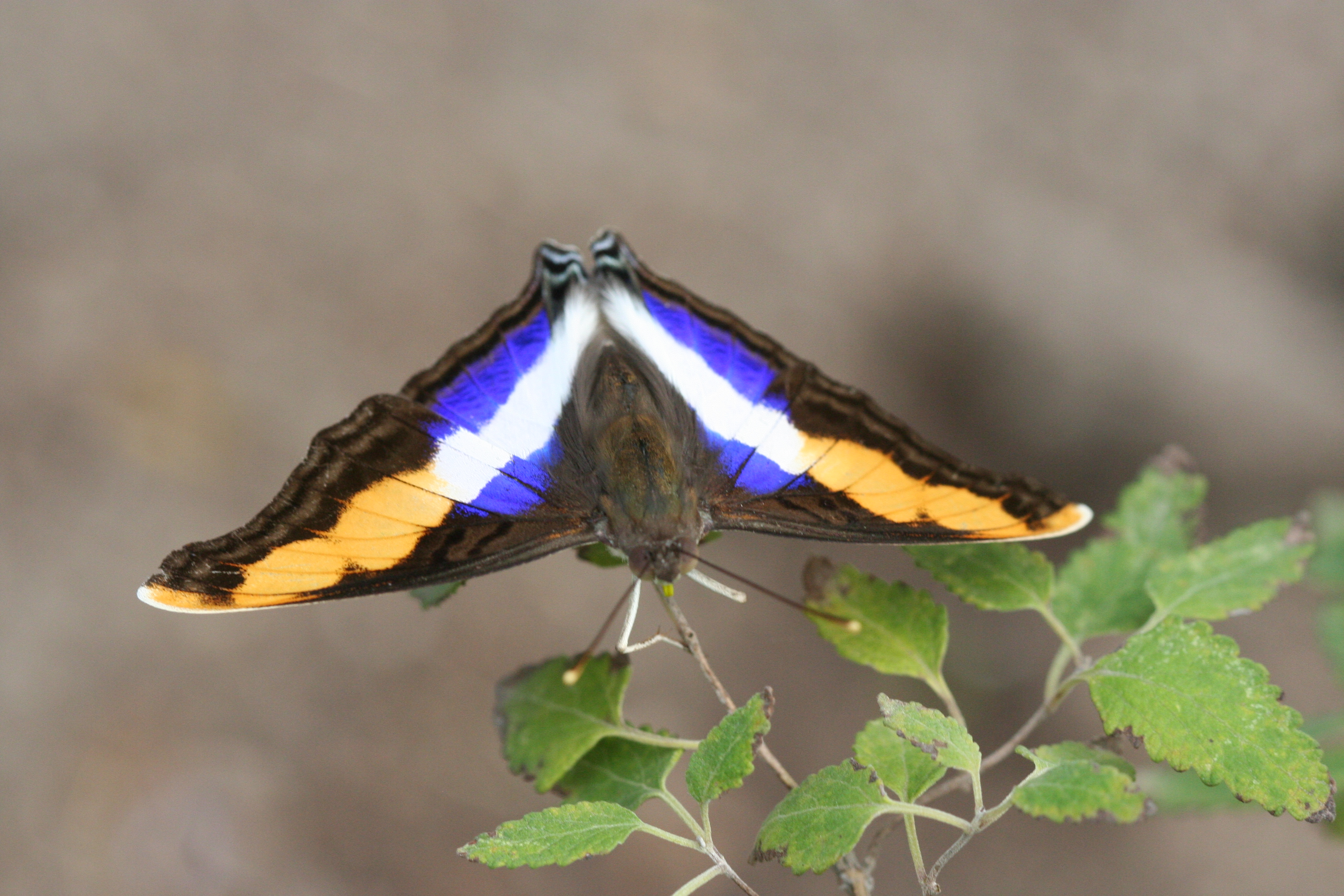
- Male
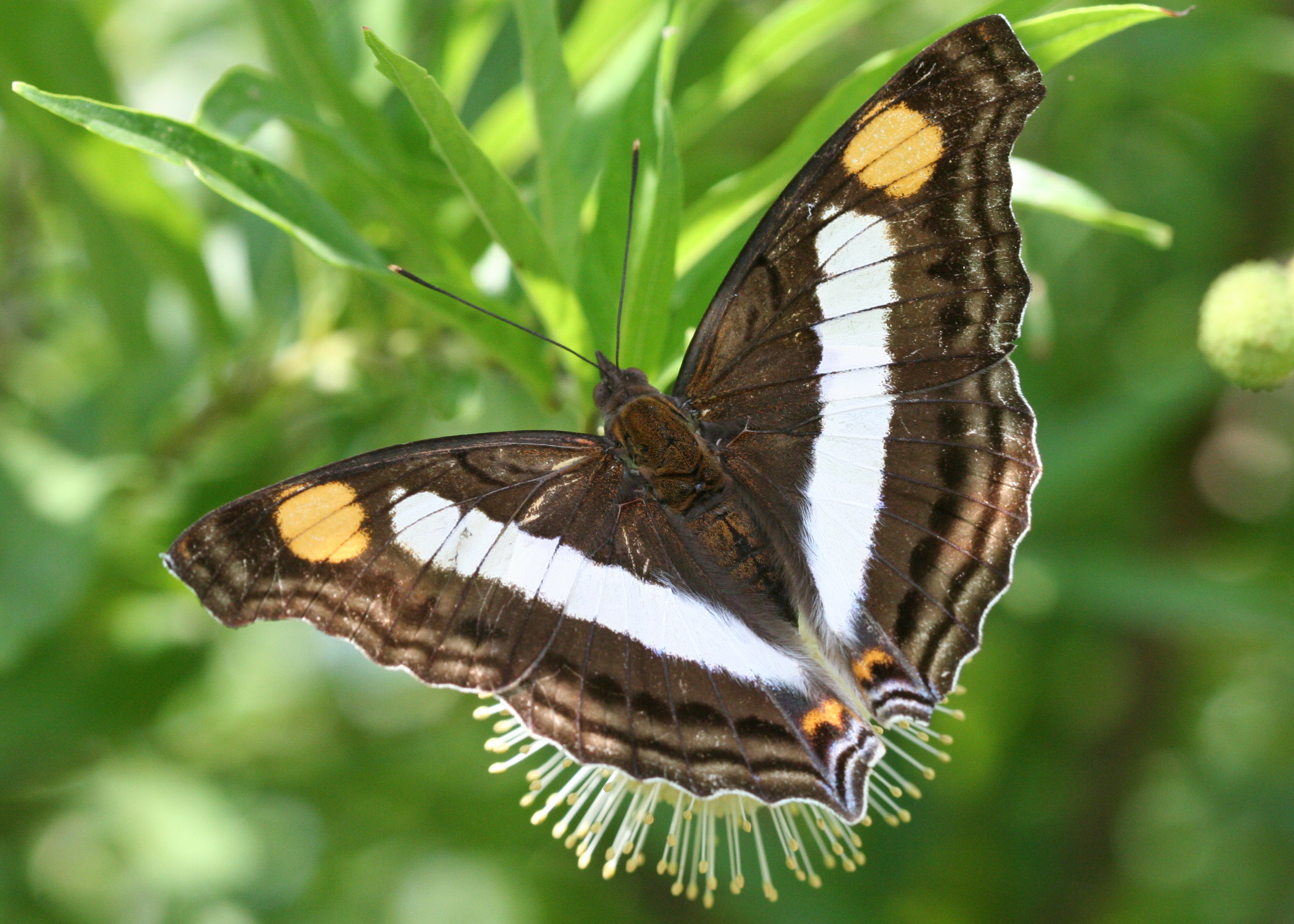
- Female

Scientific classification
- Kingdom: Animalia
- Phylum: Arthropoda
- Class: Insecta
- Order: Lepidoptera
- Family: Nymphalidae
- Genus: Doxocopa
- Species: D. laure

Binomial name
- Doxocopa laure (Drury, 1773)

Synonyms
- Papilio laure Drury, [1773]; Apatura acca C. & R. Felder, [1867]; Catargyria laure mileta f. majugena Fruhstorfer, 1907; Doxocopa linda laurina Bryk, 1938; Catargyria laura Hübner, [1823]; Doxocopa laure fabricii Hall, 1935; Apatura griseldis C. & R. Felder, 1862; Chlorippe laurona Schaus, 1902; Chlorippe acca Boisduval, 1870; Catargyria laure mima Fruhstorfer, 1907; Chlorippi laure lauricola Kaye, 1925

= Doxocopa laure =

Silver emperor

Species of butterfly

Doxocopa laure, the silver emperor, is a species of butterfly of the family Nymphalidae.

== Description ==
Doxocopa laure has a wingspan reaching about 82 millimetres (3.2 in). The upperside of the wing is dark brown with a slight bluey iridescence, with a white central band on the hindwing, and an orange forewing on males. For females, the upperside is dark brown with no iridescence, with a white median band on both wings, ending with a yellow spot at the hindwing leading edge. On both sexes, the underside of the hindwing is greyish with a silver iridescence.

== Distribution ==
This species occurs year-round in Brazil and Mexico, and during July–December in southern North America areas, such as Texas.

== Subspecies ==
- Doxocopa laure laure (Mexico, Honduras, Guatemala)
- Doxocopa laure laura (Hübner, [1823]) (Jamaica)
- Doxocopa laure druryi (Hübner, [1825]) (Cuba)
- Doxocopa laure griseldis (C. & R. Felder, 1862) (Upper Amazon, Peru)
- Doxocopa laure laurona (Schaus, 1902) (Brazil: Rio de Janeiro)
- Doxocopa laure mima (Fruhstorfer, 1907) (Colombia, Trinidad)
