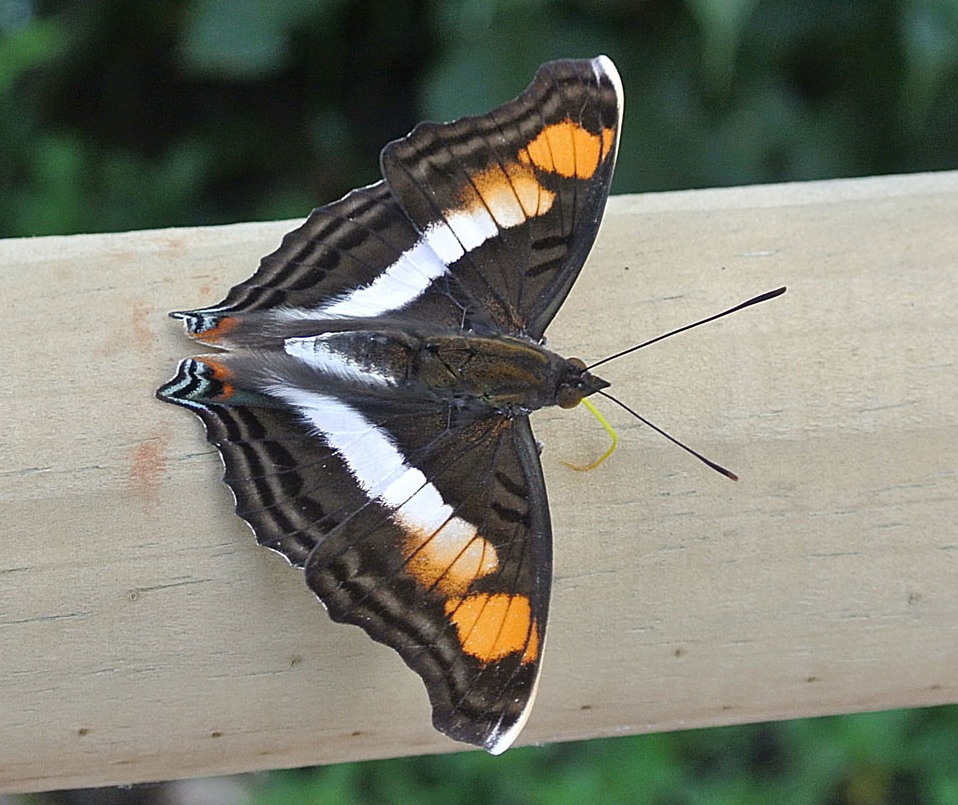

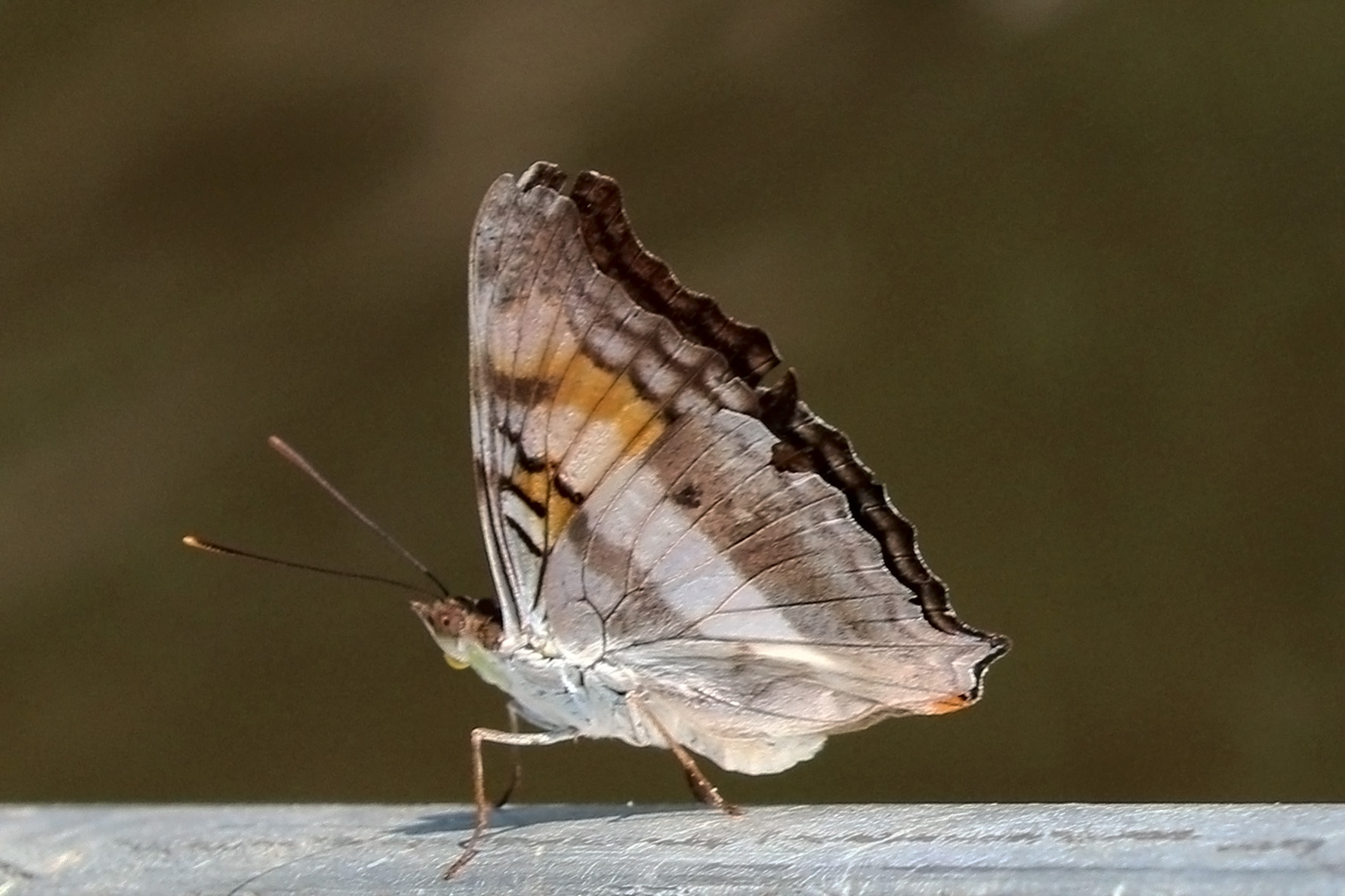
- Dorsal and lateral aspects

Scientific classification
- Domain: Eukaryota
- Kingdom: Animalia
- Phylum: Arthropoda
- Class: Insecta
- Order: Lepidoptera
- Family: Nymphalidae
- Genus: Doxocopa
- Species: D. linda

Binomial name
- Doxocopa linda (C. Felder & R. Felder, 1862)

Synonyms
- Apatura linda C. Felder & R. Felder, 1862; Chlorippe linda Godman & Salvin, [1884]; Apatura selina Bates, 1865; Chlorippe linda mileta Boisduval, 1870; Apatura lauretta Staudinger, 1886; Catargyria selina murrina Fruhstorfer, 1907; Catargyria selina modica Fruhstorfer, 1907; Catargyria linda myia Fruhstorfer, 1907; Catargyria linda nitoris Fruhstorfer, 1907; Catargyria linda geyeri Fruhstorfer, 1907; Catargyria linda paulana Fruhstorfer, 1912; Chlorippe laure f. hübneri Röber, 1916; Apatura plesaurina Butler & H. Druce, 1872; Chlorippe linda godmani Dannatt, 1904

= Doxocopa linda =

Linda's emperor

Species of butterfly

Doxocopa linda, or Linda's emperor, is a species of Neotropical butterfly in the family Nymphalidae and subfamily Apaturinae. It was described by Cajetan Felder and Rudolf Felder in 1862. It is found in Peru, Ecuador and the Brazilian state of Amazonas.

== Subspecies ==
- Doxocopa linda linda (Peru, Ecuador, Brazil: Amazonas)
- Doxocopa linda mileta (Boisduval, 1870) (Paraguay, Brazil: Santa Catarina, Rio Grande do Sul, Espírito Santo, Minas Gerais, Rio de Janeiro, São Paulo)
- Doxocopa linda plesaurina (Butler & H. Druce, 1872) (Costa Rica, Panama)
- Doxocopa linda godmani (Dannatt, 1904) (Venezuela)
- Doxocopa linda carwa Lamas, 1999 (Peru)
