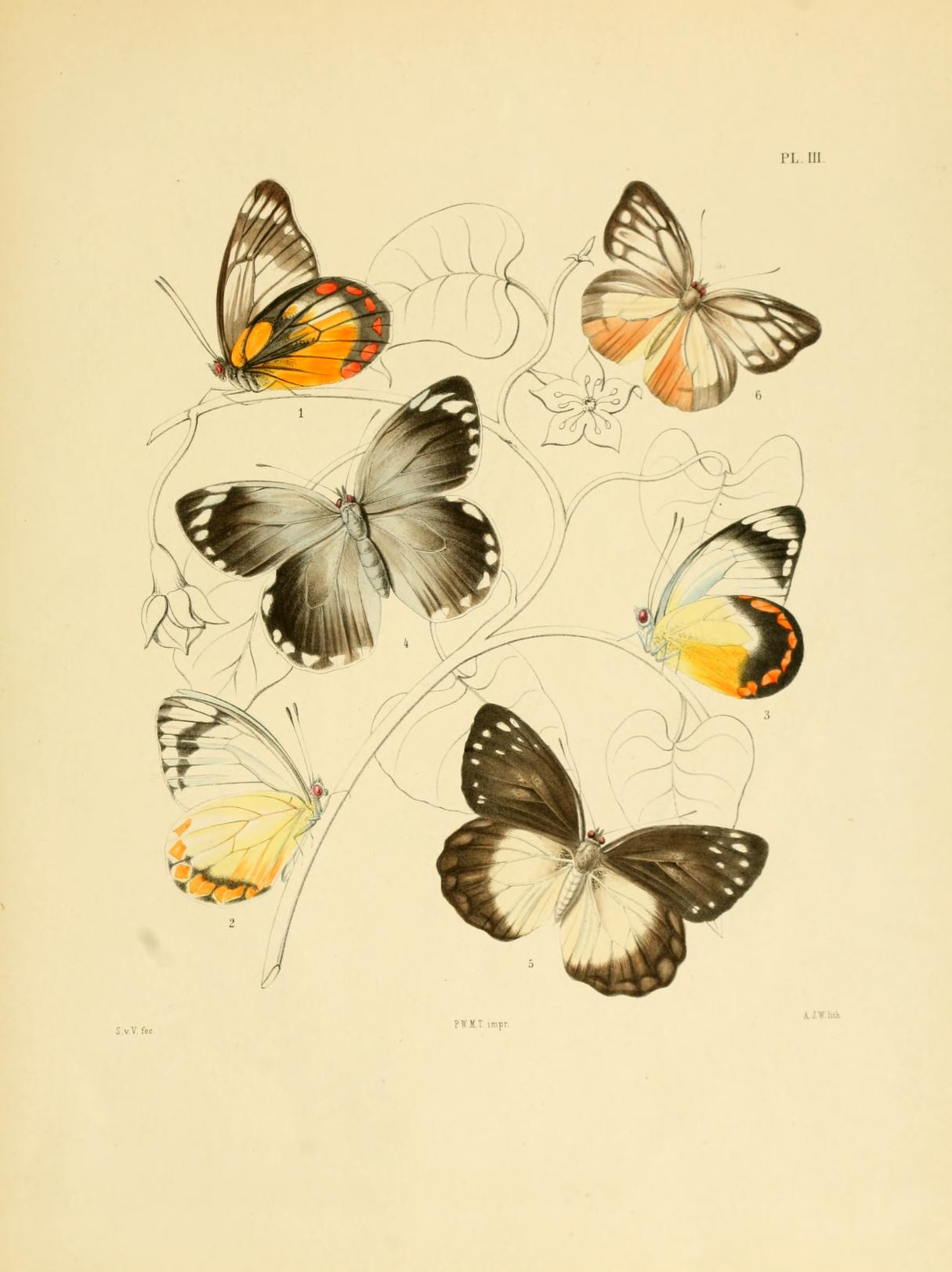
- Delias candida in Vollenhoven Monograph Pieridae

Scientific classification
- Kingdom: Animalia
- Phylum: Arthropoda
- Class: Insecta
- Order: Lepidoptera
- Family: Pieridae
- Genus: Delias
- Species: D. candida

Binomial name
- Delias candida Vollenhoven, 1865

Synonyms
- Pieris candida Vollenhoven, 1865; Pieris herodias Vollenhoven, 1865; Delias candida antissa Fruhstorfer, 1913; Delias candida teuthrania Fruhstorfer, 1913

= Delias candida =

Species of butterfly

Delias candida is a butterfly in the family Pieridae. It was described by Samuel Constantinus Snellen van Vollenhoven in 1865. It is found in the Australasian realm (Moluccas).

== Description ==
With D. candida Voll. (55 b) begins the series of species peculiar to the Moluccas; candida has entirely white upper surface to both wings, through which, however, the black and yellow markings of the under surface are distinctly visible. Sexual dimorphism is very prominent in all the Moluccan species, compare the entirely black-grey female which only bears white submarginal spots. The underside hears brighter colours; the proximal half of the wings is yellowish grey, the distal half black, the forewing bears white submarginal lunules and the hindwing dark ochre-coloured ones. Batjan, Obi. Not rare.

== Subspecies ==
- Delias candida candida (Bachan, Kasiruta, Mandioli, Obi)
- Delias candida herodias Vollenhoven, 1865 (Halmahera)
- Delias candida morotaiensis Morita, 1993 (Morotai)

== Taxonomy ==
candida is a member of the Delias isse species group.
