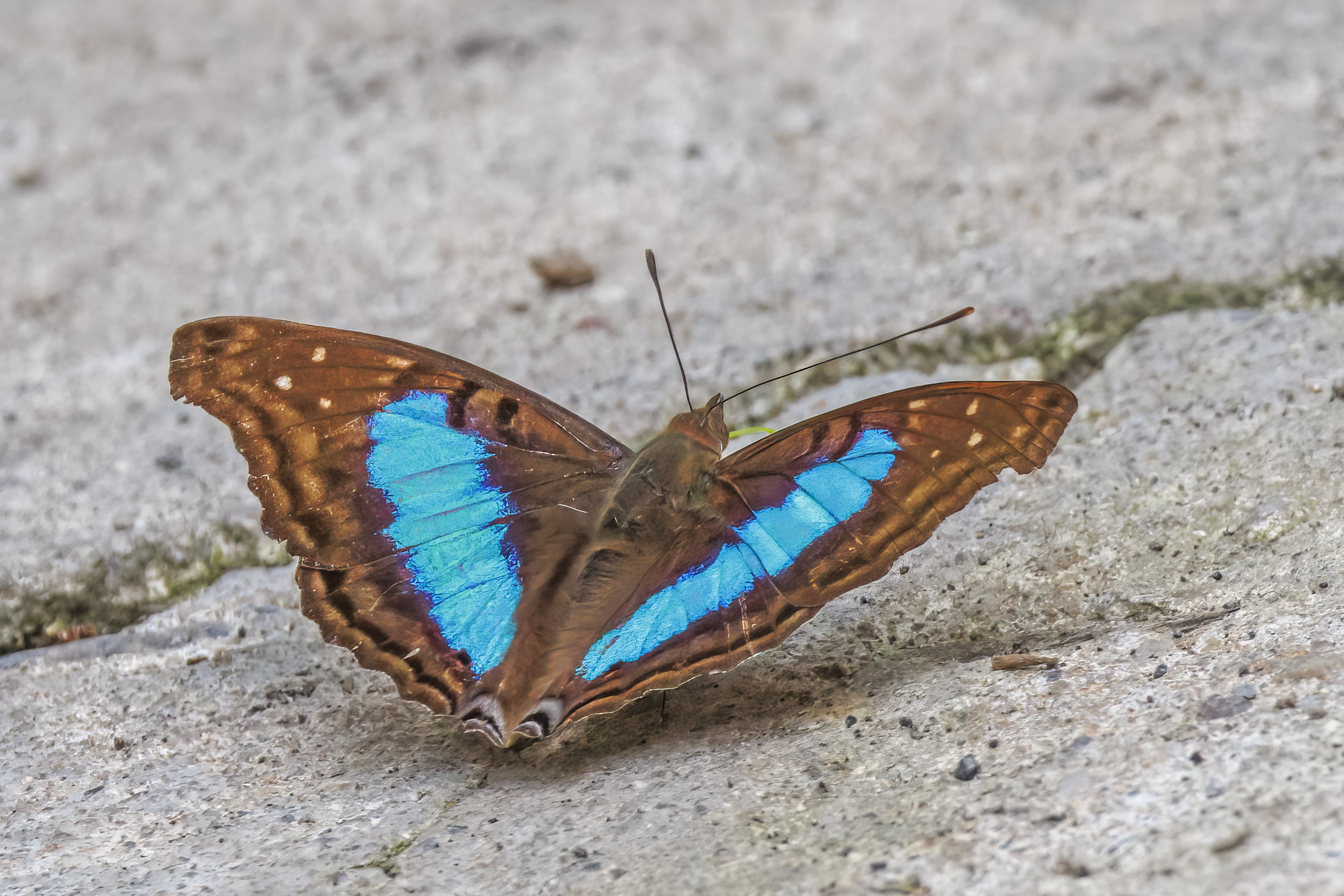
- Male D. l. cherubina from Ecuador
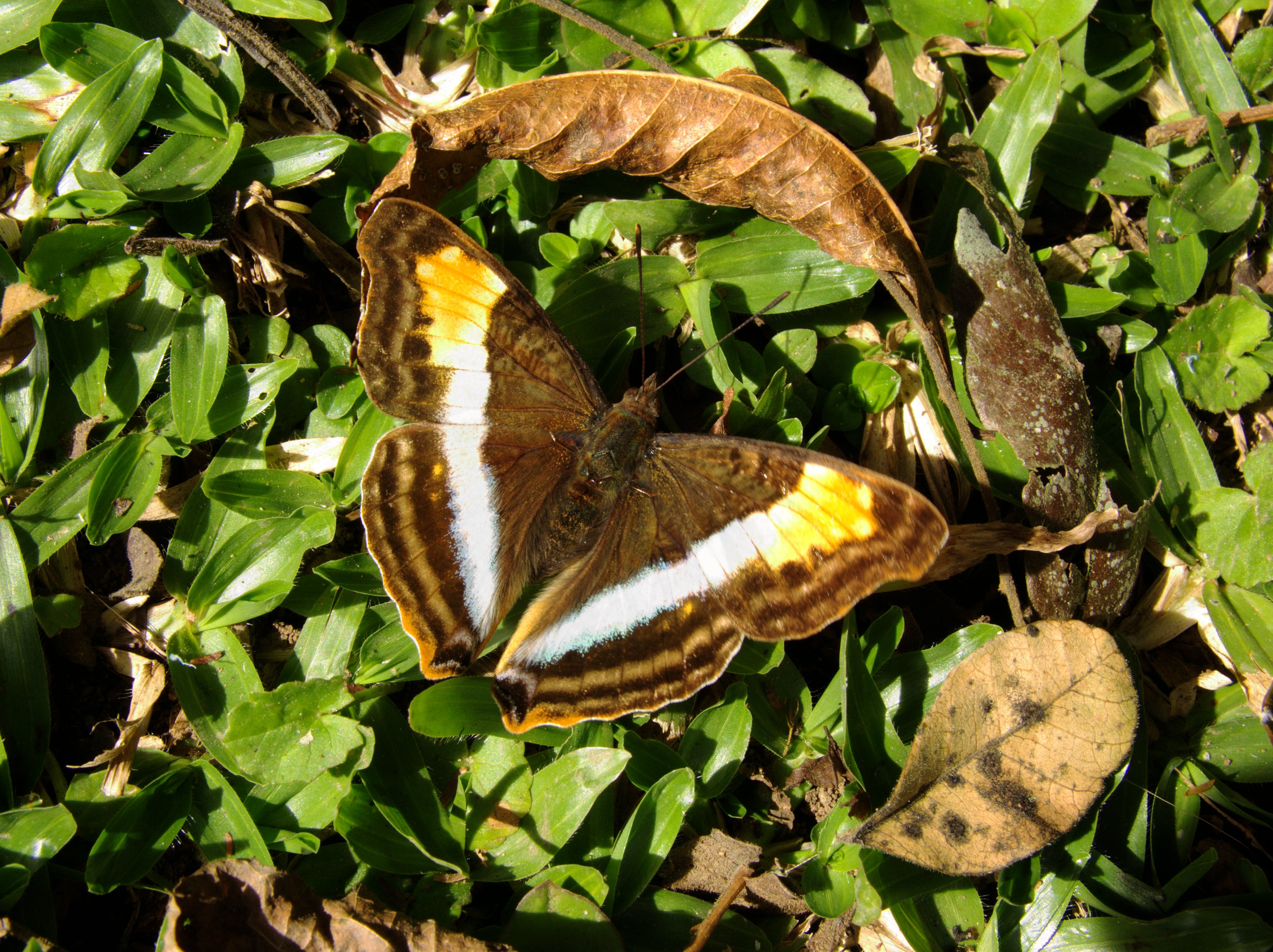
- Female from Brazil

Scientific classification
- Kingdom: Animalia
- Phylum: Arthropoda
- Class: Insecta
- Order: Lepidoptera
- Family: Nymphalidae
- Genus: Doxocopa
- Species: D. laurentia

Binomial name
- Doxocopa laurentia (Godart, [1823])

Synonyms
- Nymphalis laurentia Godart, 1823; Catargyria seraphina Hübner, [1825]; Apatura angelina C. & R. Felder, 1867; Apatura laurentia Hewitson, 1869 (preocc. Godart, [1824]); Apatura cherubina C. & R. Felder, [1867]; Chlorippe cherubina parva Röber, 1916; Chlorippe seraphina hippomanes Martin, [1823]; Catargyria thalysia Fruhstorfer, 1907

= Doxocopa laurentia =

Species of butterfly

Doxocopa laurentia, the turquoise emperor or Cherubina emperor, is a species of butterfly of the family Nymphalidae, subfamily Apaturinae.

== Description ==
Doxocopa laurentia has a wingspan reaching about 75 millimetres (3.0 in). The upperside of the wings is brown, with a broad metallic blue central band in males, while in the females this band is usually white, with a broad orange patch on the top of the forewings. The undersides of the wings are yellowish or greyish, with black markings on the forewings.

Like other members of the subfamily Apaturinae, the proboscis is green.

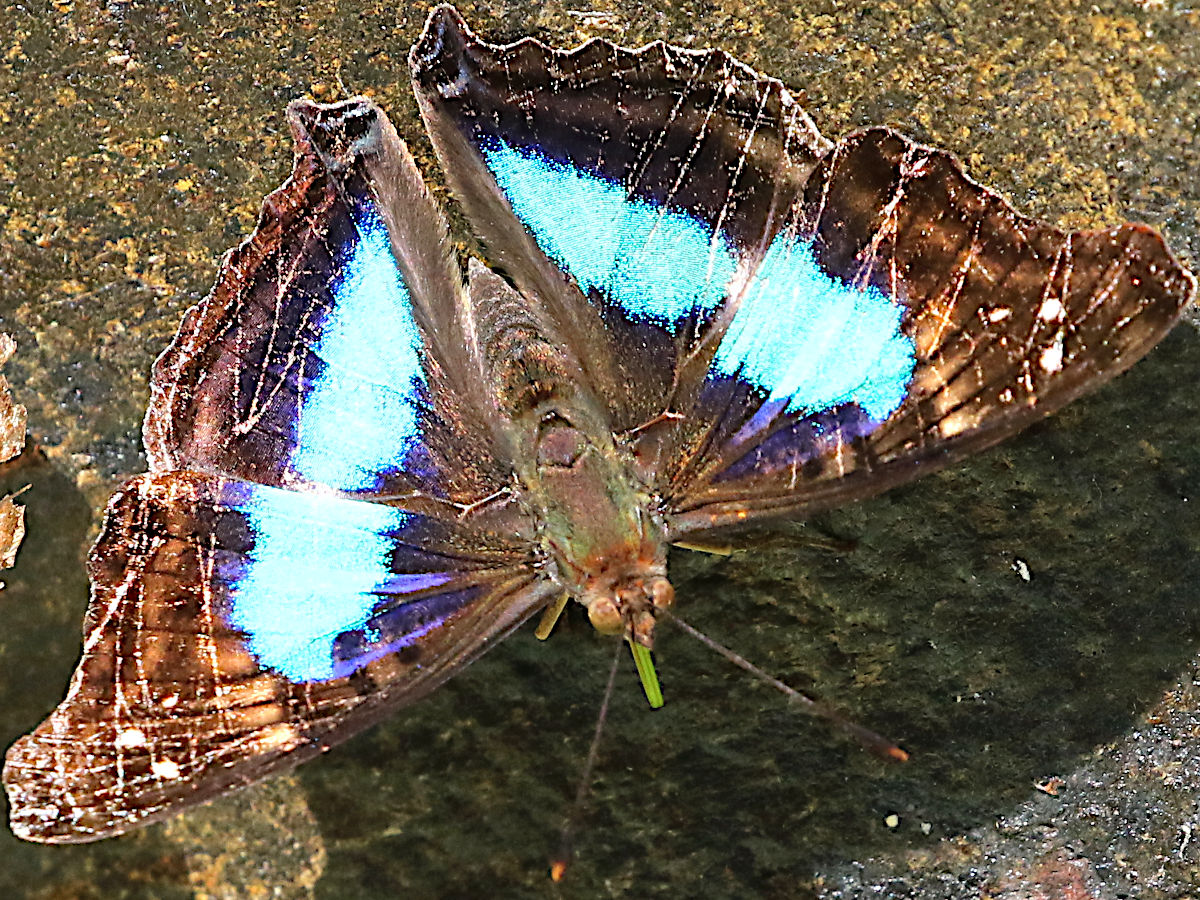
D. l. laurentia male with green proboscis

== Distribution ==
This species occurs in Venezuela, Mexico, Brazil, Bolivia, Ecuador, Colombia, Peru, Argentina and Uruguay.

== Subspecies ==
- Doxocopa laurentia laurentia (Brazil and Argentina)
- Doxocopa laurentia cherubina (C. & R. Felder, 1867) (Central America, Colombia, Bolivia and Peru)
- Doxocopa laurentia thalysia (Fruhstorfer, 1907) (Ecuador)

== Gallery ==
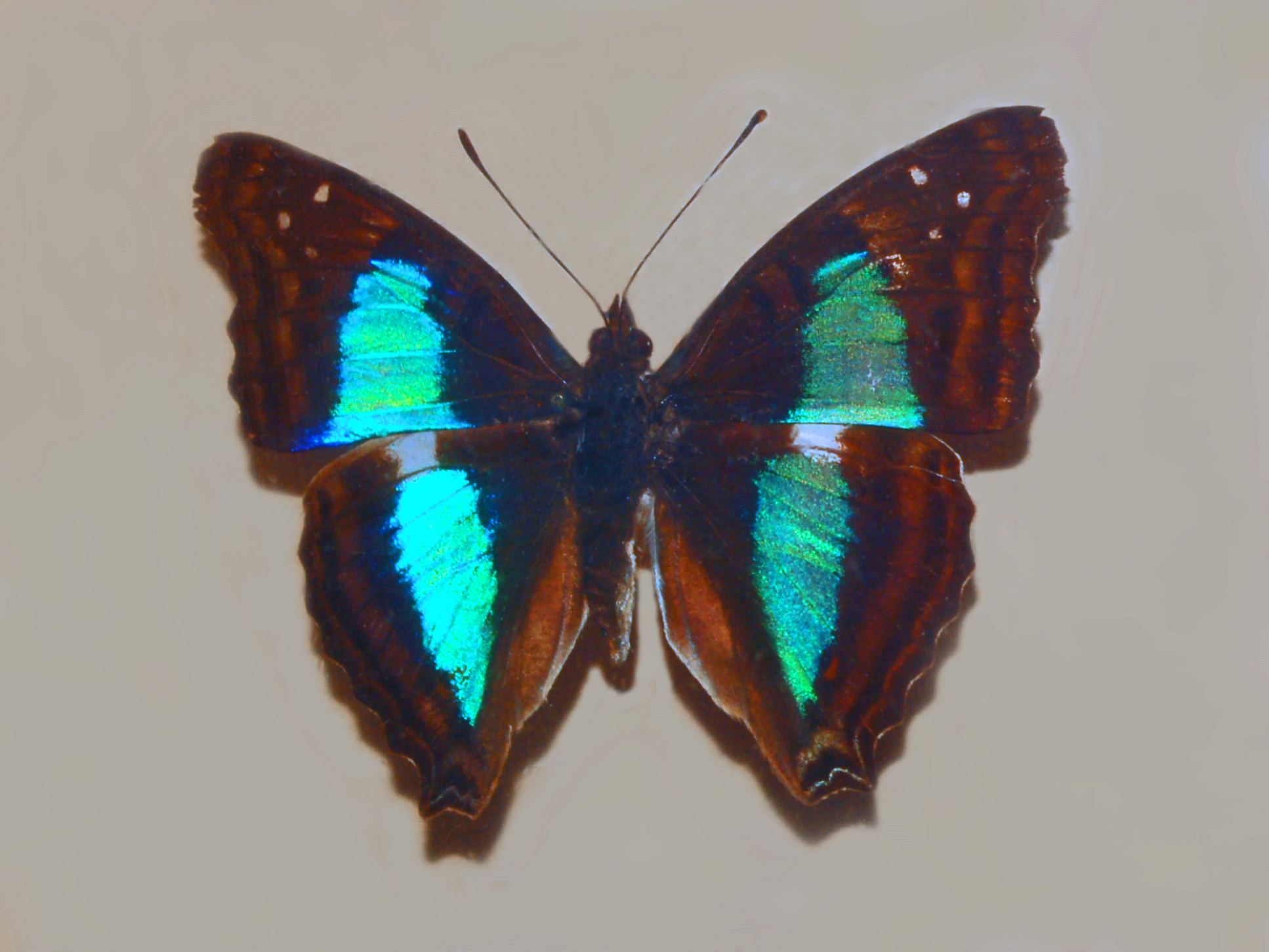
D. l. cherubina from Peru - mounted specimen

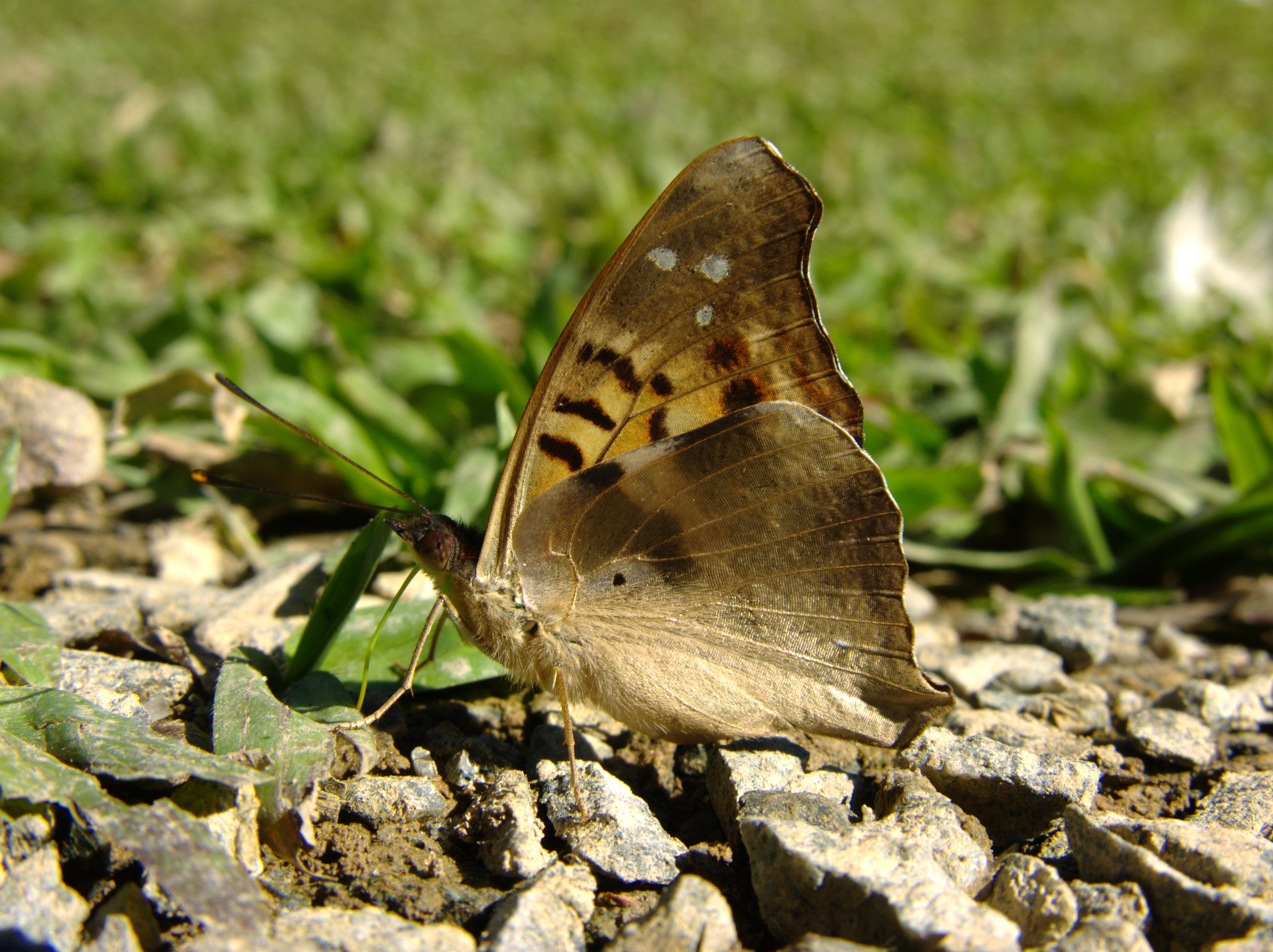
from Brazil - ventral view
