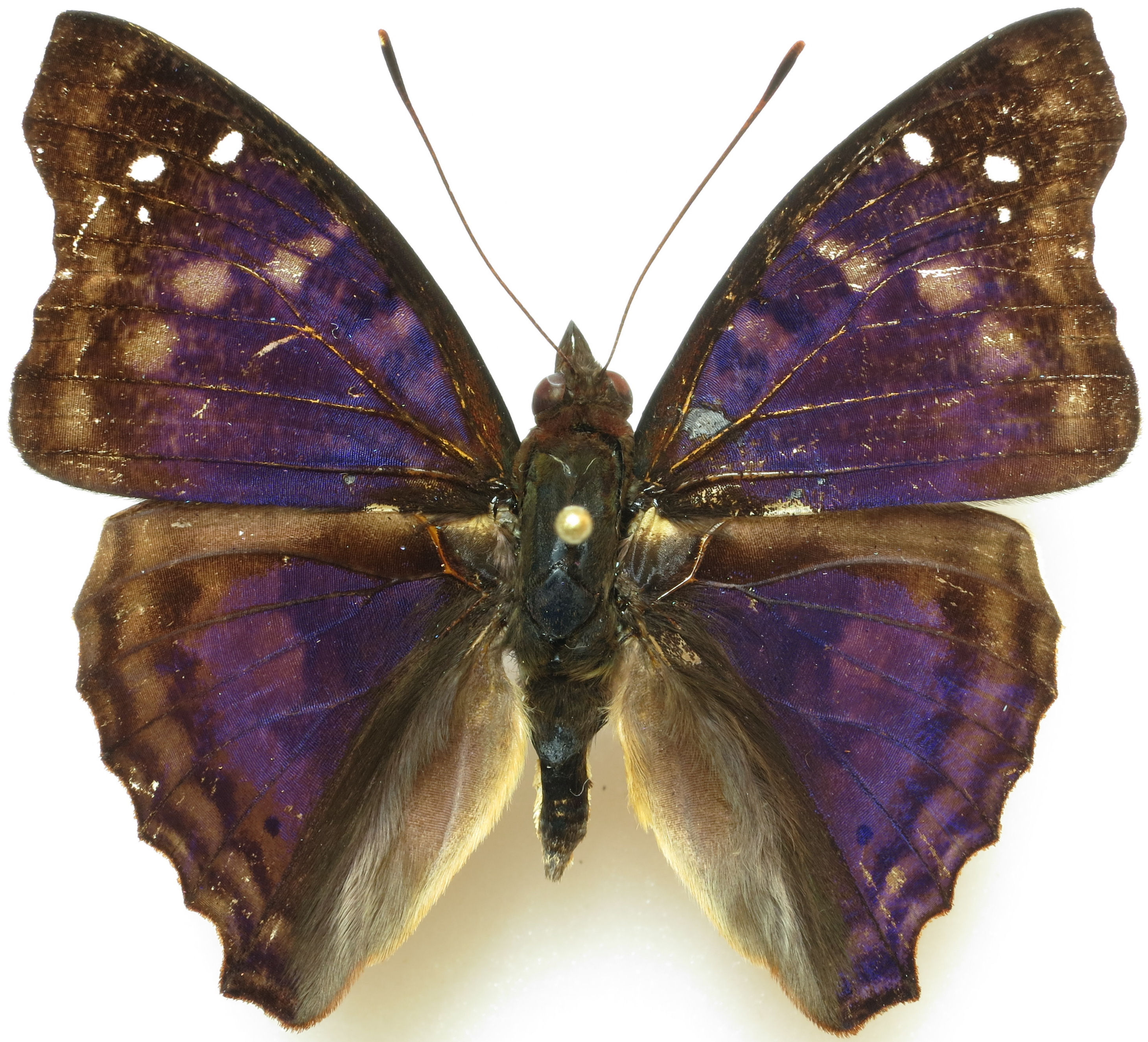
- Male
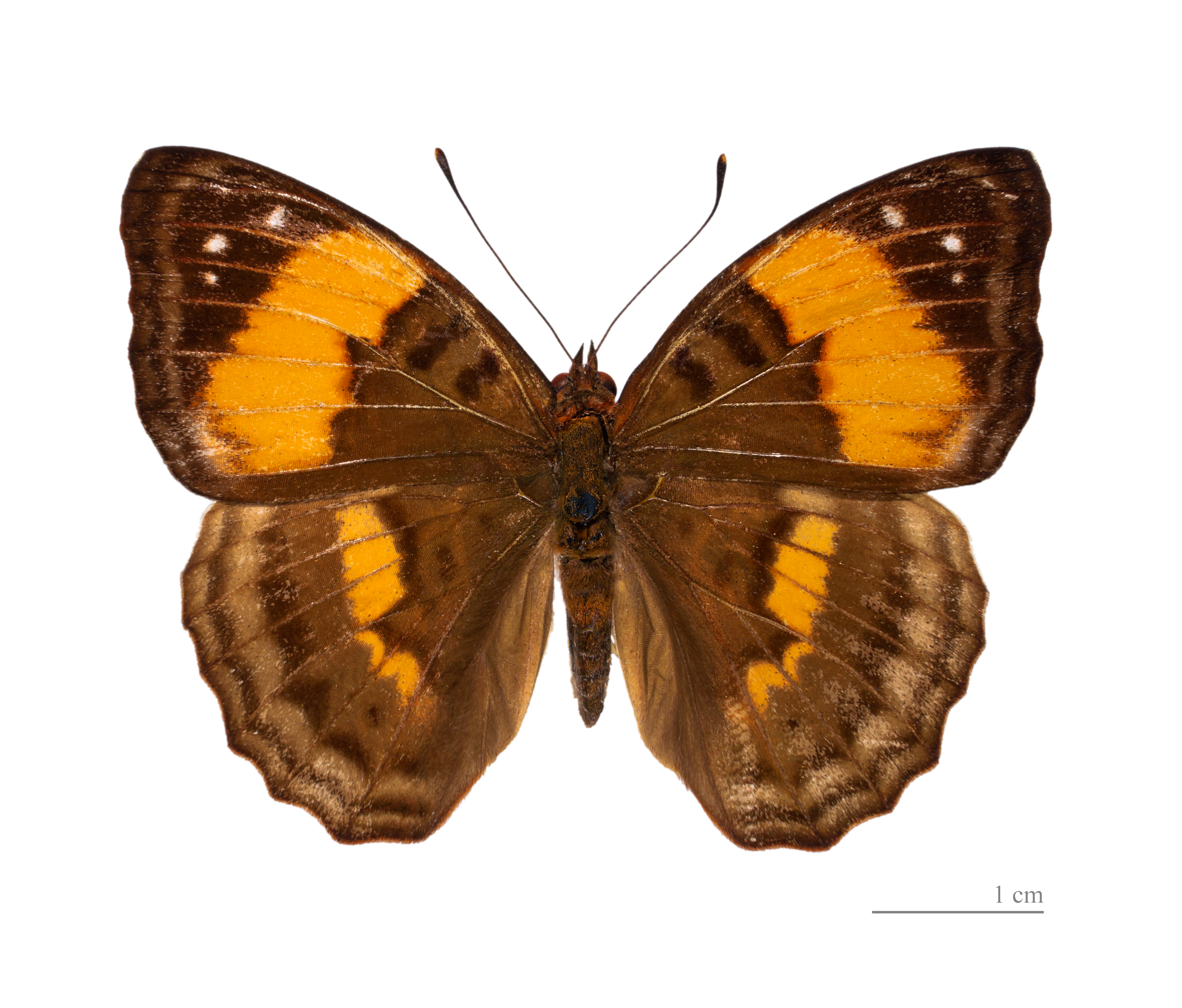
- Female

Scientific classification
- Domain: Eukaryota
- Kingdom: Animalia
- Phylum: Arthropoda
- Class: Insecta
- Order: Lepidoptera
- Family: Nymphalidae
- Genus: Doxocopa
- Species: D. agathina

Binomial name
- Doxocopa agathina (Cramer, 1777)

Synonyms
- Papilio Agatha Cramer, 1777; Nymphalis vacuna Godart, 1824; Doxocopa marse Geyer, 1832; Chlorippe vacuna ab. cretaceata Stichel, 1900; Chlorippe vacuna fluibunda Fruhstorfer, 1907; Apatura vacana Oberthür, 1914; Chlorippe vacuna f. albofasciata Schade, 1944

= Doxocopa agathina =

Agathina emperor

Species of butterfly

Doxocopa agathina, the agathina emperor, is a species of butterfly of the family Nymphalidae. It is found in the Guyanas, northern Brazil, and the Amazon region. It is also called the purple emperor but this name may also refer to the European butterfly Apatura iris.

== Description ==
The color of the wings varies by sex. Males have bright blue or purple wings, but the females' wings are darker in color, usually shades of brown. Females also typically have a diagonal orange band across their forewings. In both sexes, the wingspan measures about 50 millimetres (2.0 inches).

Like other members of the subfamily Apaturinae, the proboscis is green .

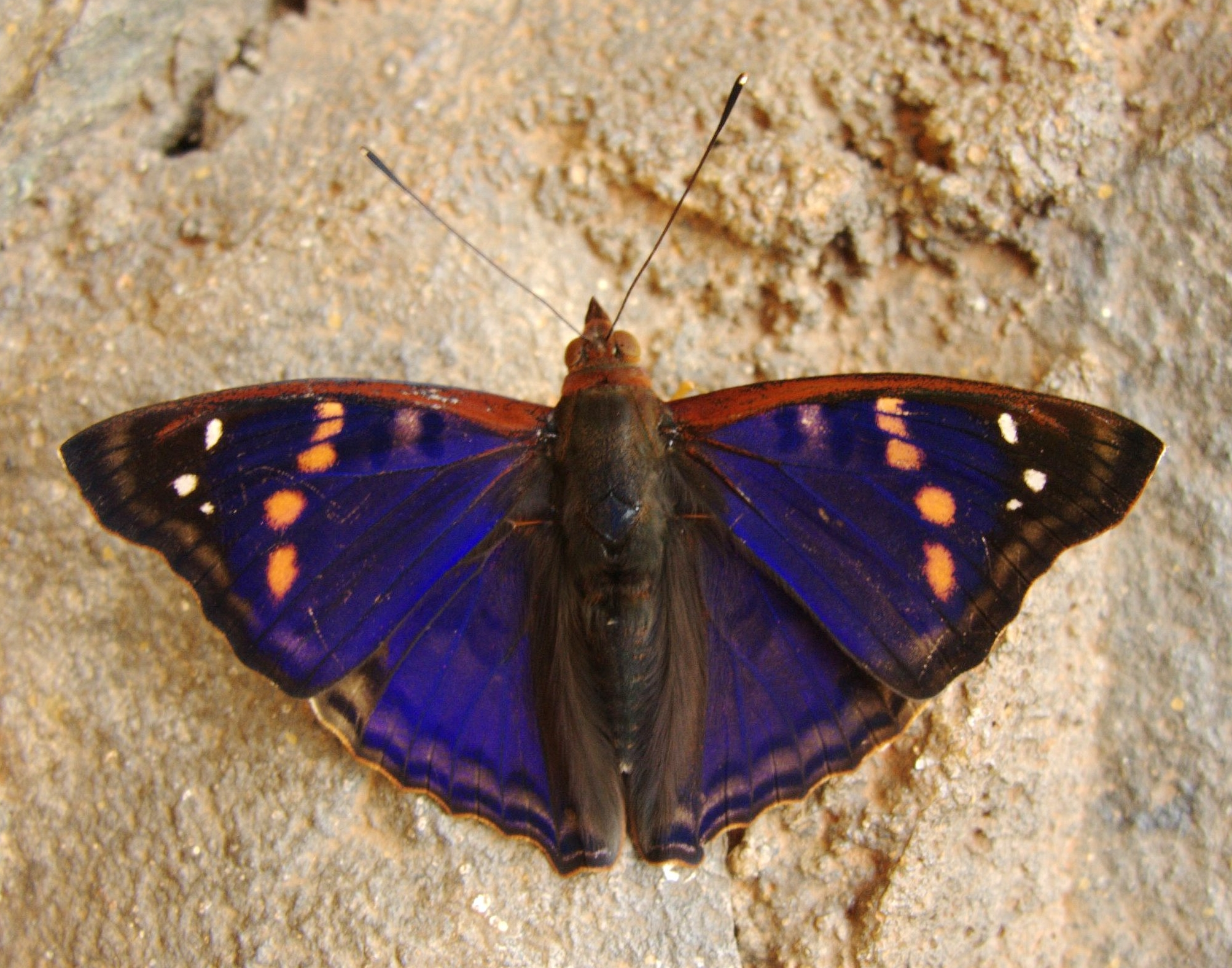
Dorsal side
Foz do Iguaçu, Brazil

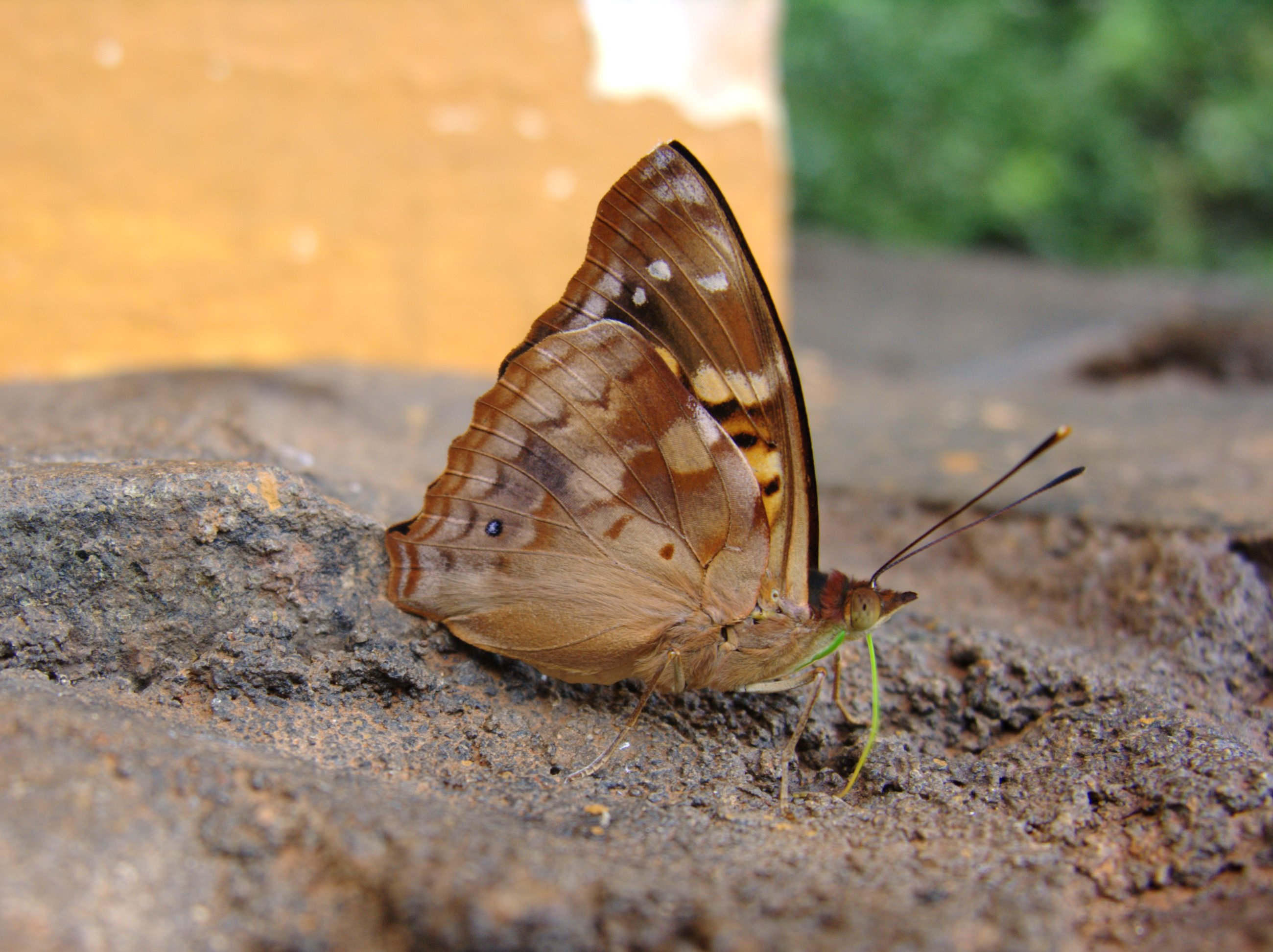
Ventral side
Foz do Iguaçu, Brazil

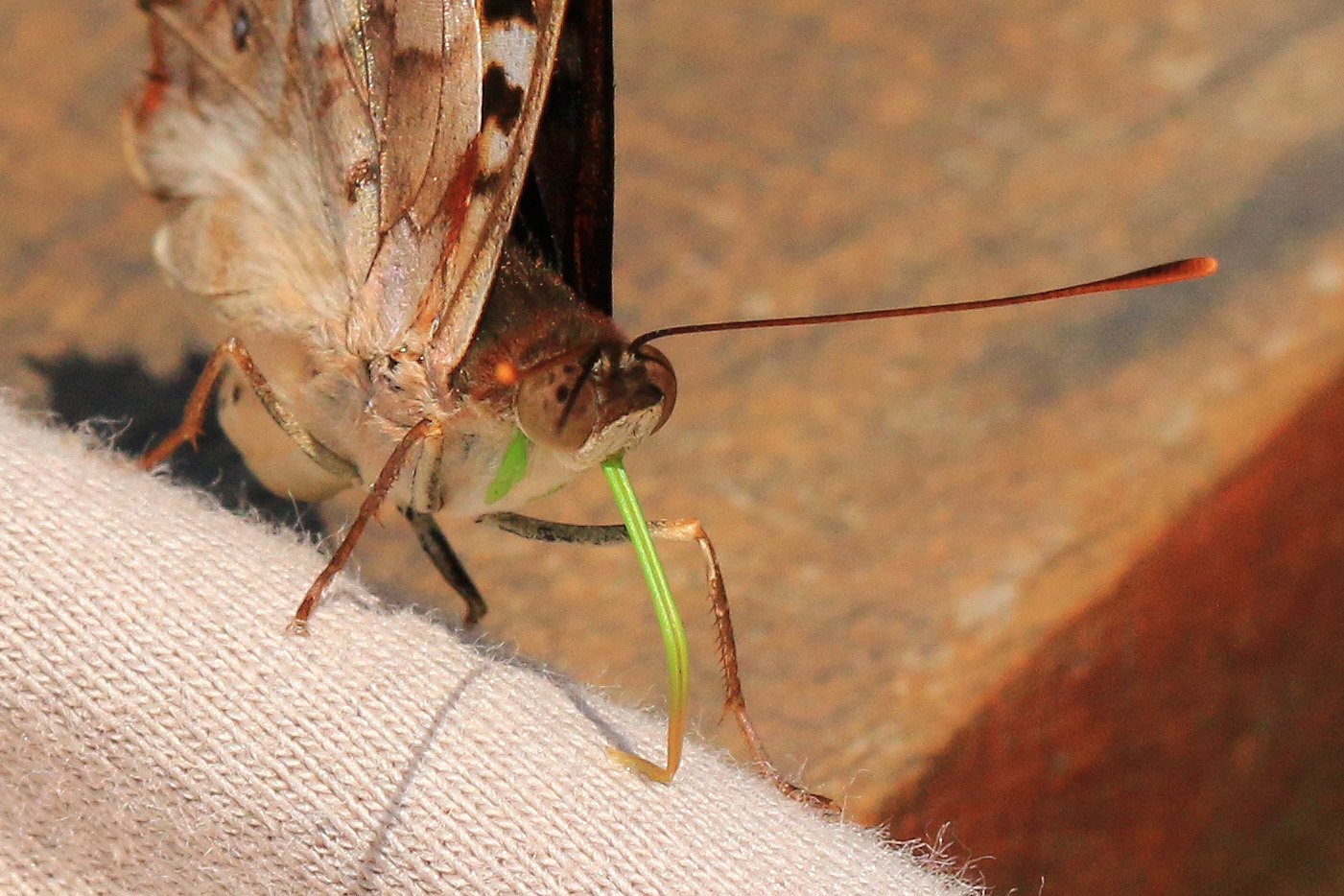
Showing green proboscis
Cristalino River, Southern Amazon, Brazil

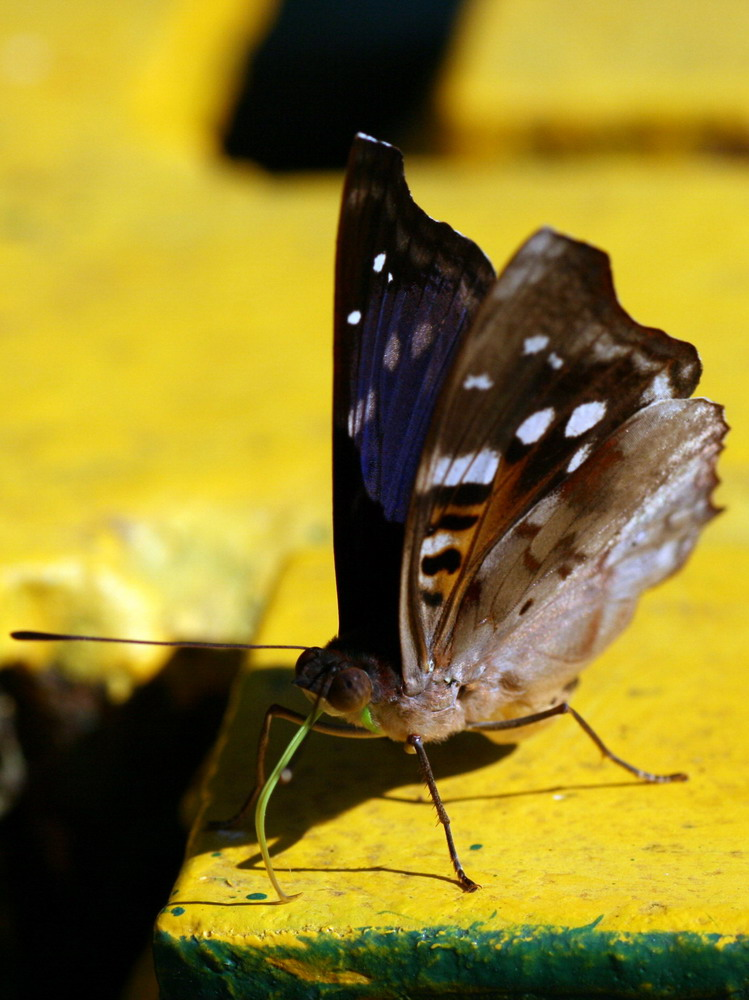
Male from Tingo María, Peru

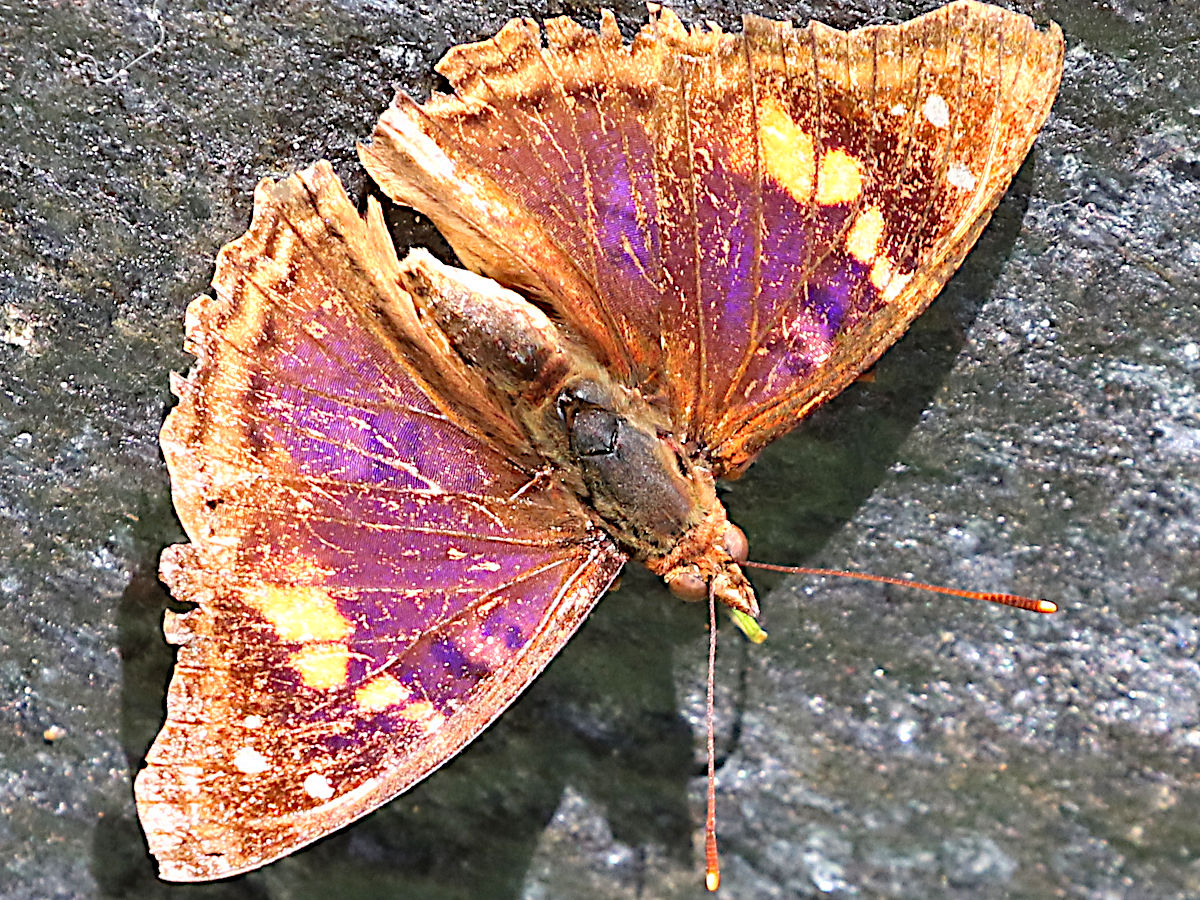
Worn male Iguazu Falls, Argentina

== Subspecies ==
- Doxocopa agathina agathina (Suriname)
- Doxocopa agathina vacuna (Godart, [1824]) (Brazil: Rio de Janeiro, Paraguay)
