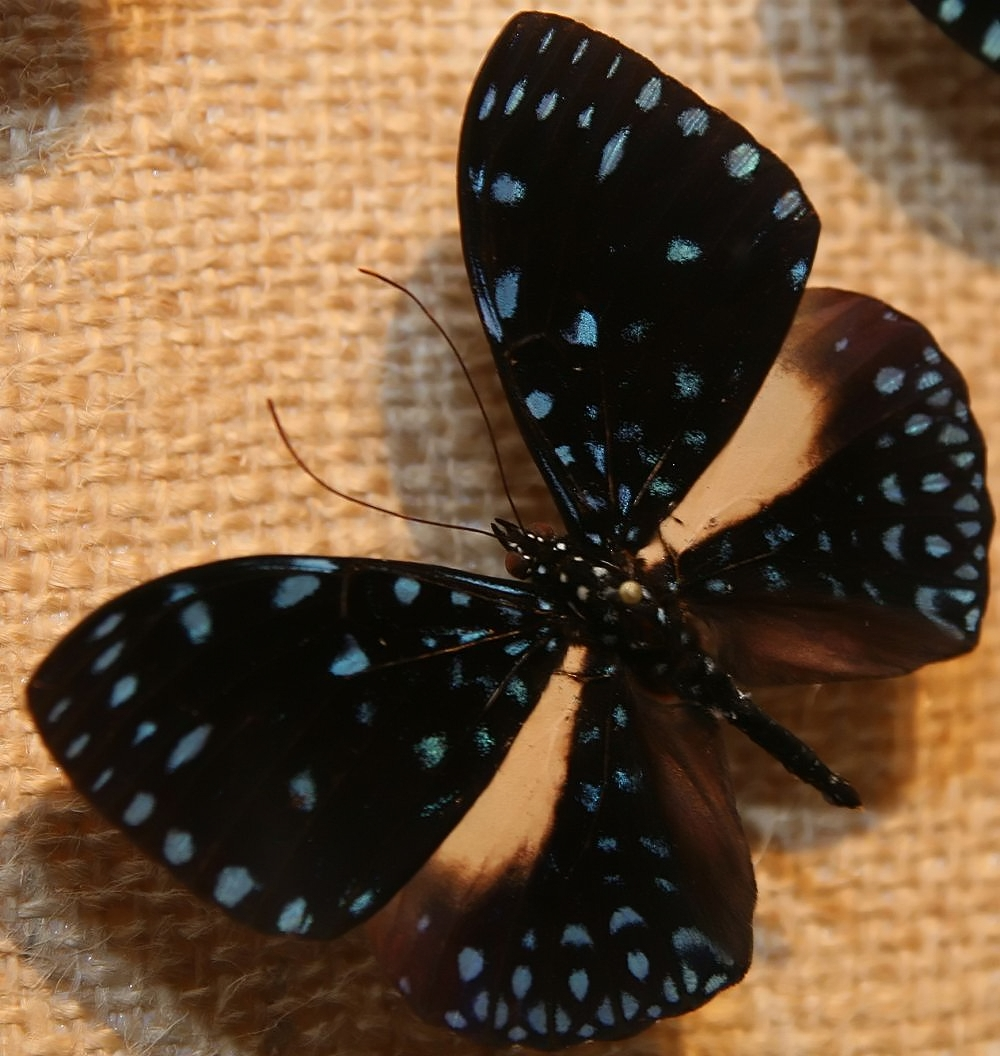

Scientific classification
- Domain: Eukaryota
- Kingdom: Animalia
- Phylum: Arthropoda
- Class: Insecta
- Order: Lepidoptera
- Family: Nymphalidae
- Genus: Hamadryas
- Species: H. arethusa

Binomial name
- Hamadryas arethusa (Cramer, 1775)

Synonyms
- Papilio arethusa Cramer, 1775

= Hamadryas arethusa =

Species of butterfly

Hamadryas arethusa is a species of cracker butterfly in the family Nymphalidae. It is found in South America.

Some authors consider it to be a synonym of Hamadryas laodamia.
