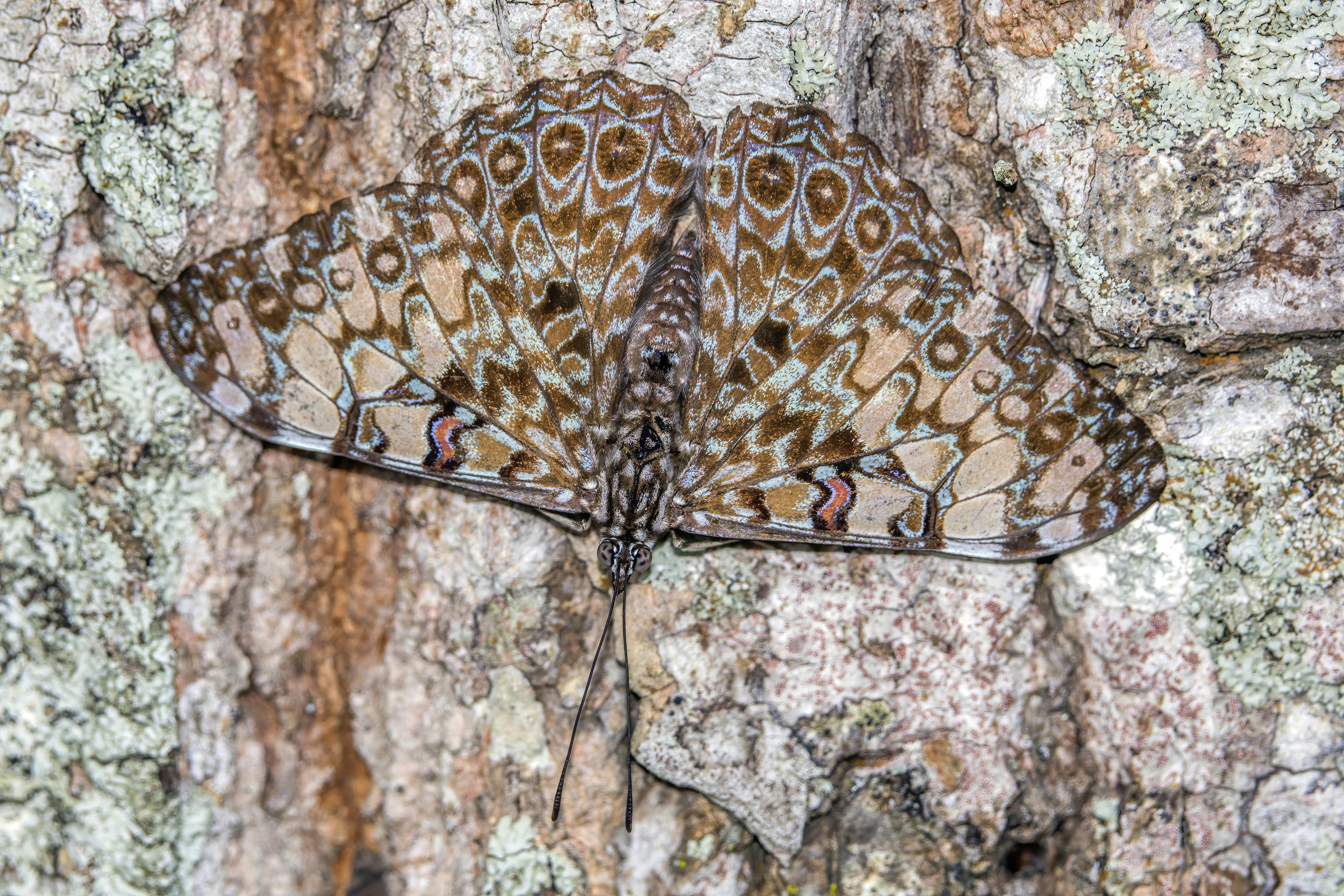
- Hamadryas feronia farinulenta in Honduras

Scientific classification
- Kingdom: Animalia
- Phylum: Arthropoda
- Class: Insecta
- Order: Lepidoptera
- Family: Nymphalidae
- Genus: Hamadryas
- Species: H. feronia

Binomial name
- Hamadryas feronia (Linnaeus, 1758)

Synonyms
- Papilio feronia Linnaeus, 1758; Peridroma feronia Godman & Salvin, 1883; Amphichlora feronia Dyar, 1903

= Hamadryas feronia =

Variable cracker

Species of butterfly

Hamadryas feronia, the blue cracker or variable cracker, is a species of cracker butterfly in the family Nymphalidae. It is found in the southern parts of North America and South America and southwards Brazil.

== Description ==
Hamadryas feronia is similar in appearance to Hamadryas guatemalena and Hamadryas iphthime. The upperside of the fore wing is a mosaic pattern of white, brown and bluish-grey, with a row of small eyespots parallel with the outer margin; a small red bar occupies the discal cell. The upperside of the hind wing is similar but has few white patches and larger more distinct eyespots. The underside of the fore wing is white or whitish-tan with dark markings, a small red bar and a black submarginal eyespot, and the under hind wing is white or whitish-tan, with dark markings and blue rings containing larger eyespots near the rear margin.

The larva has two colour morphs; it is either bluish-black above with brownish-white speckles and reddish spots on the side, or it is greyish-green with a pale-coloured longitudinal line on the side. It has dorsal spines on the second and third thoracic segments and on the seventh and eighth abdominal segments. The pupa has two long processes on its anterior end.

== Distribution and habitat ==
Two subspecies are recognised; H. feronia feronia occurs in Brazil, Paraguay and Peru, and H. feronia farinulenta occurs in Mexico, Honduras, Venezuela, Colombia and Trinidad. This butterfly is found in open areas with trees.

== Ecology ==
In Mexico, the adults are on the wing all year, but are most common between June and September. The larvae feed on vines in the family Euphorbiaceae; in South America, Dalechampia triphylla is often the host plant. The adult butterflies feed on rotting fruit. They often perch head-down, flattened against the surface of tree trunks; their colouring makes them well-camouflaged against the bark. When a butterfly approaches, a male will fly out, making a characteristic cracking sound, probably by means of a pair of rods on the abdomen. If the new arrival is a male it will click in response, while if a female, it will remain silent. Females also perch on tree trunks, but in an experiment it was found that when offered perching places that were black, grey or white, males showed a preference for white while females preferred grey.

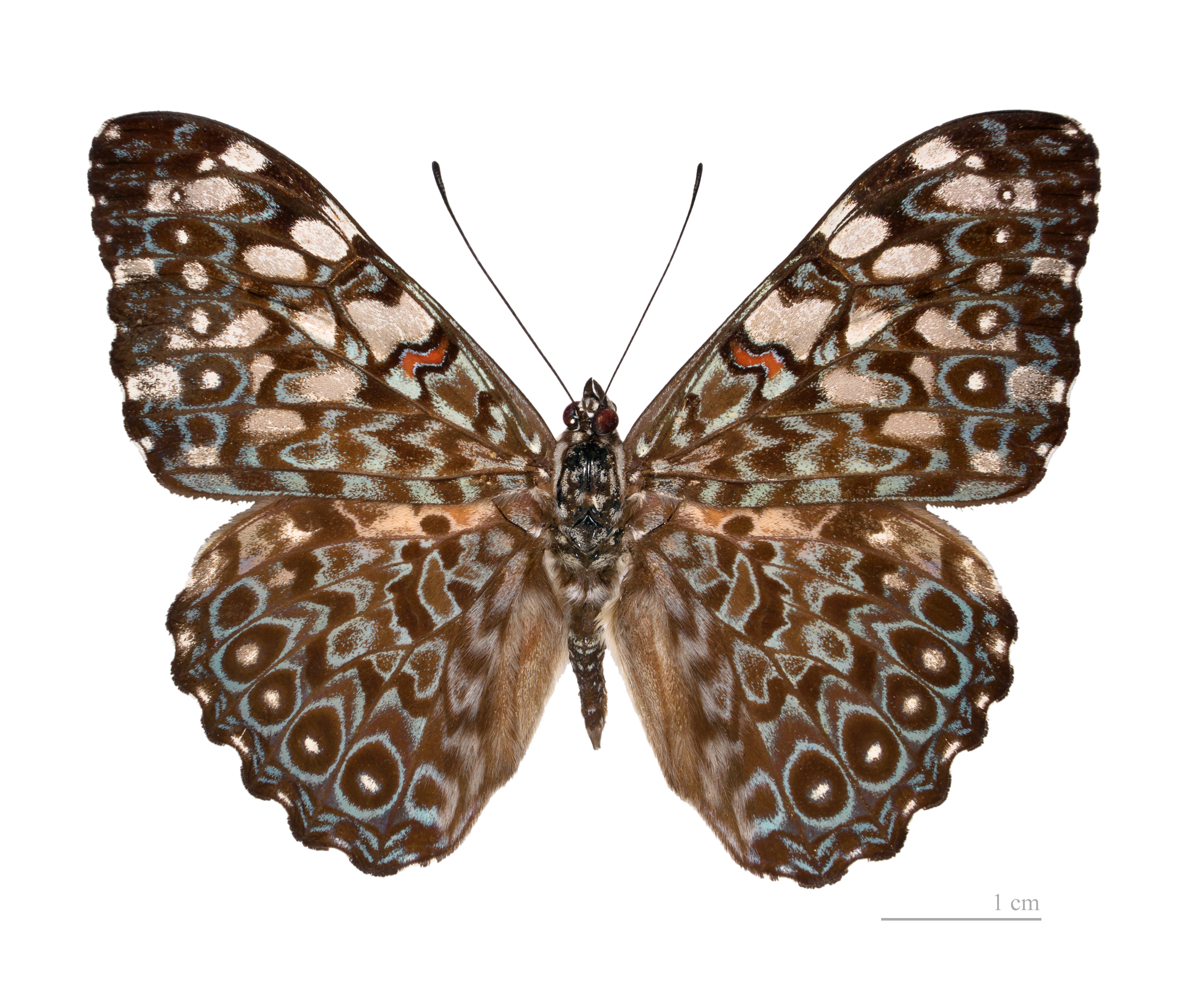
upperside, (MHNT specimen)

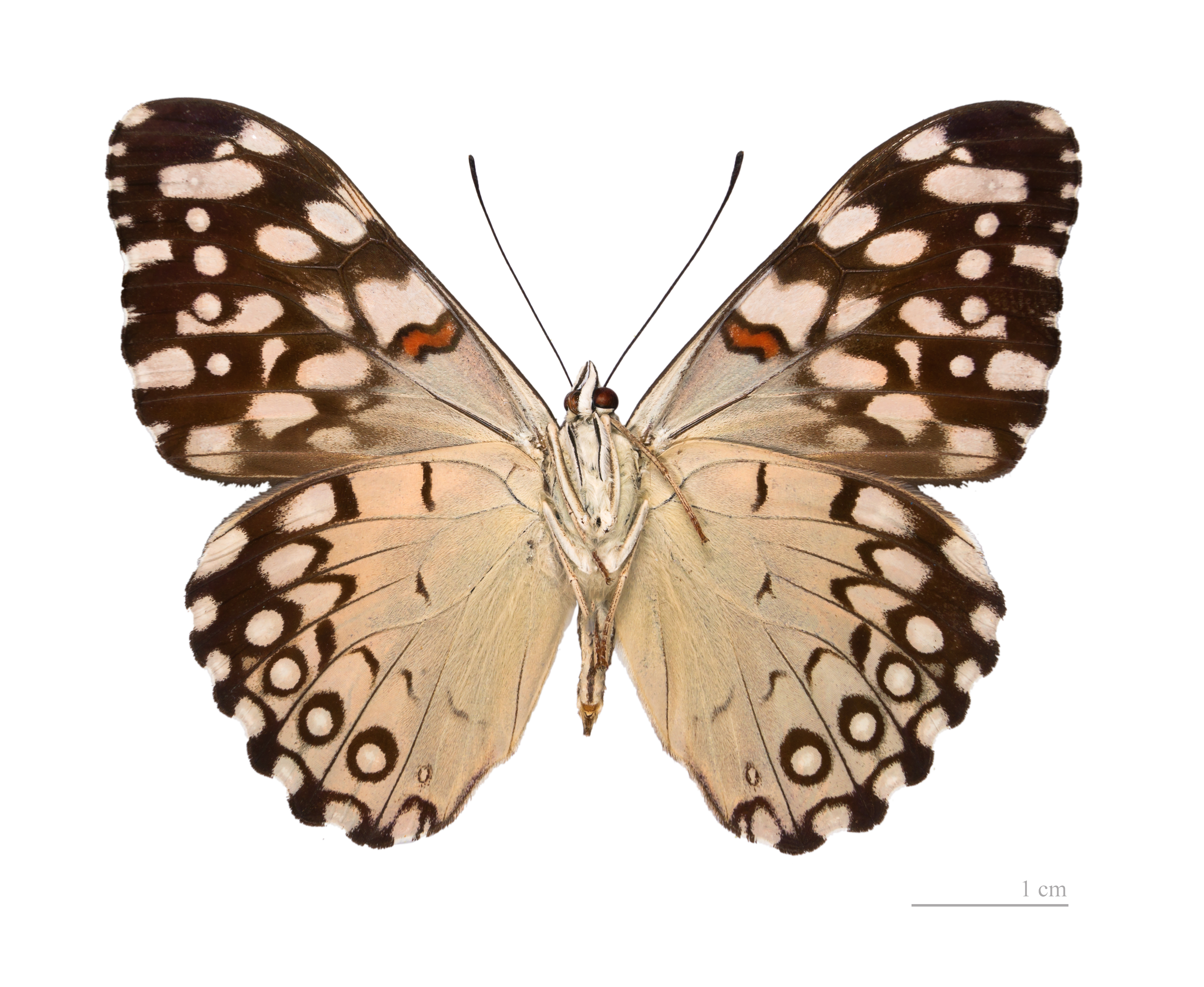
underside, (MHNT specimen)
