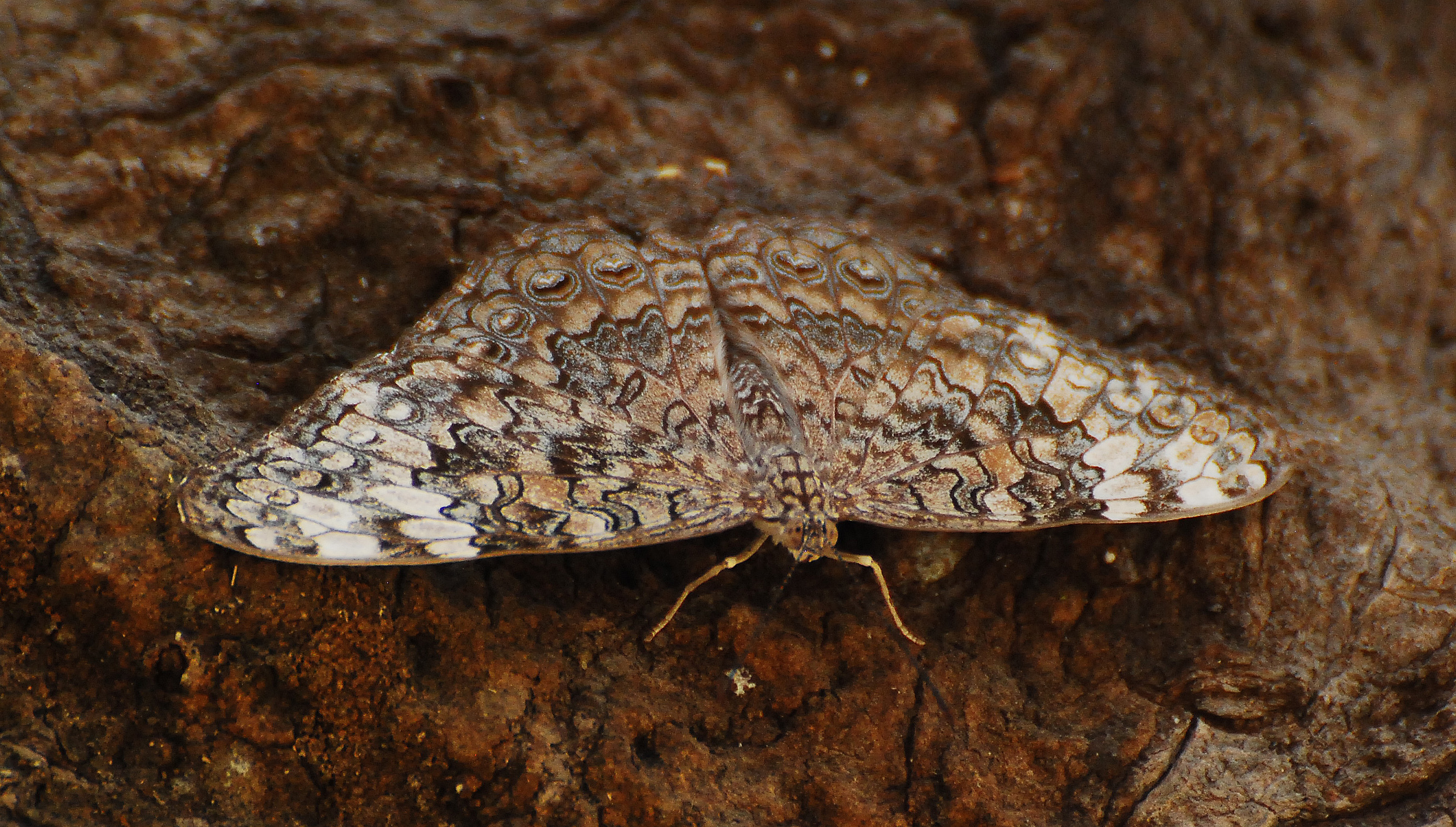
- Glaucous Cracker along Mex200 south of the mouth of Rio Seco, Oaxaca, Mexico, 080331. Hamadryas glauconome.

Scientific classification
- Domain: Eukaryota
- Kingdom: Animalia
- Phylum: Arthropoda
- Class: Insecta
- Order: Lepidoptera
- Family: Nymphalidae
- Genus: Hamadryas
- Species: H. glauconome

Binomial name
- Hamadryas glauconome (H.W. Bates, 1864)

Synonyms
- Ageronia glauconome Bates, 1864; Ageronia aenoë Doubleday, 1847; Ageronia oenoe Boisduval, 1870; Ageronia glauconome megala Fruhstorfer, 1916

= Hamadryas glauconome =

Pale cracker

Species of butterfly

Hamadryas glauconome, the pale cracker or glaucous cracker, is a species of cracker butterfly in the family Nymphalidae. It was described by Henry Walter Bates in 1864 and is found in Mexico, Central America and south to Peru. It has been recorded as an unexpected vagrant in the United States in southern Florida, Arizona and Texas.

== Description ==
Adults have wings mottled in grey, brown and white. They are very similar in appearance to the grey cracker (Hamadryas februa) and like them have small, submarginal eyespots on the underside of the hindwings that incorporate some orange scales; these are the only two members of the genus to have orange eyespot scales. The pale cracker differs from the grey cracker in lacking a small red bar on the forewing.

== Distribution and habitat ==
The pale cracker is native to Mexico, Central America and South America as far south as Guatemala and Peru. It has been recorded as a vagrant in the United States, in southeastern Arizona (rare stray), south Texas (one sighting) and Florida. It is found in open areas with scattered trees, both moist areas and semi-arid ones.

== Ecology ==
Adults do not visit flowers, instead feeding on rotting fruit, carrion, and mud. Adults are in the habit of resting on tree trunks where their mottled appearance makes them inconspicuous. On the approach of another butterfly, a male will take to the air, emitting a cracking sound; if the approaching butterfly is a male, it will respond with a crack while a female will remain silent, and this enables the male to select a partner of the opposite sex. In the evening, the butterflies congregate on the trunk of one tree before flying into nearby trees and bushes to roost separately.

The eggs are laid on the leaves of vines in the family Euphorbiaceae, the host plant in Guatemala being Dalechampia scandens.

== Subspecies ==
- H. glauconome glauconome (Guatemala, Costa Rica, Mexico)
- H. glauconome grisea Jenkins, 1983 (Mexico)
