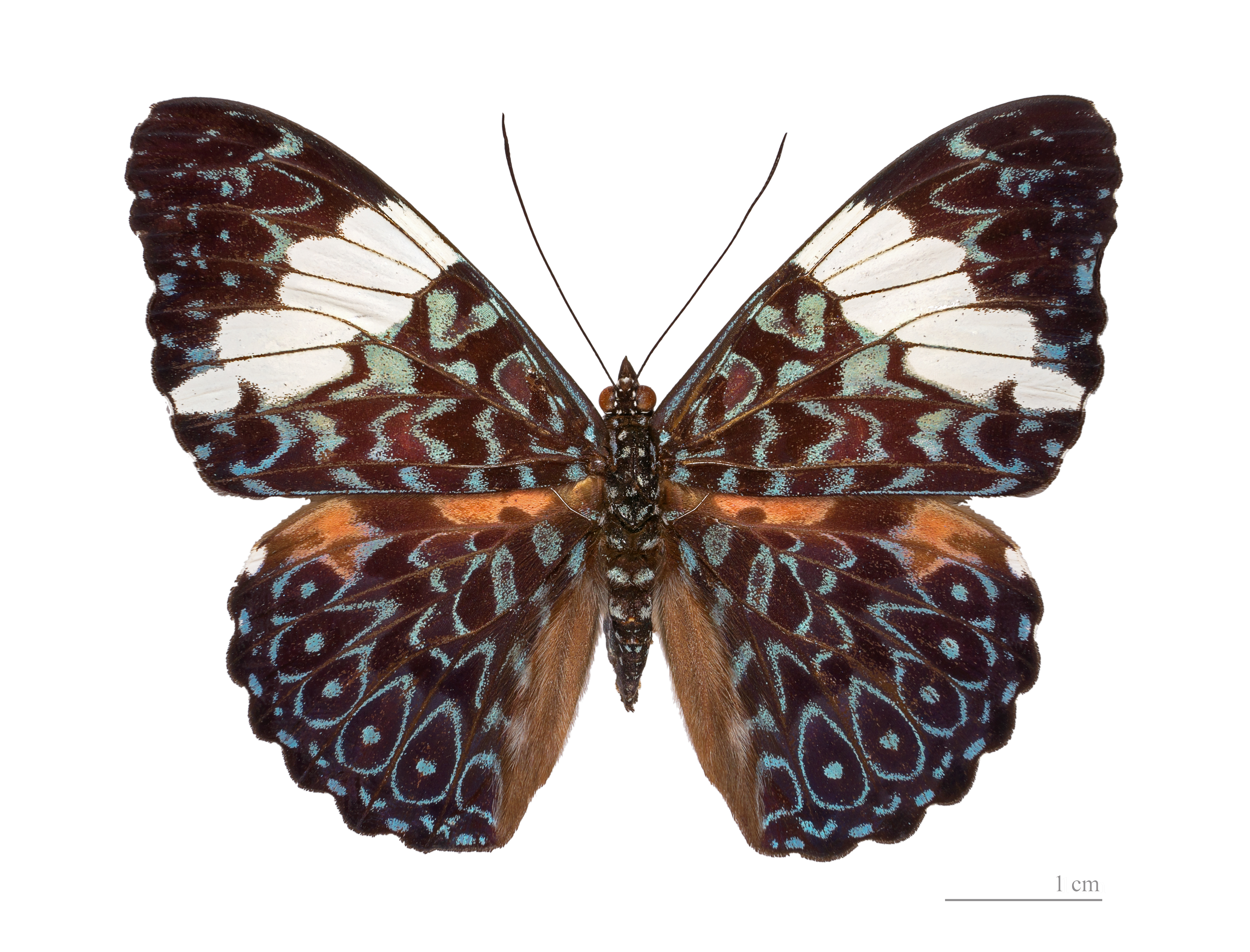
- From MHNT
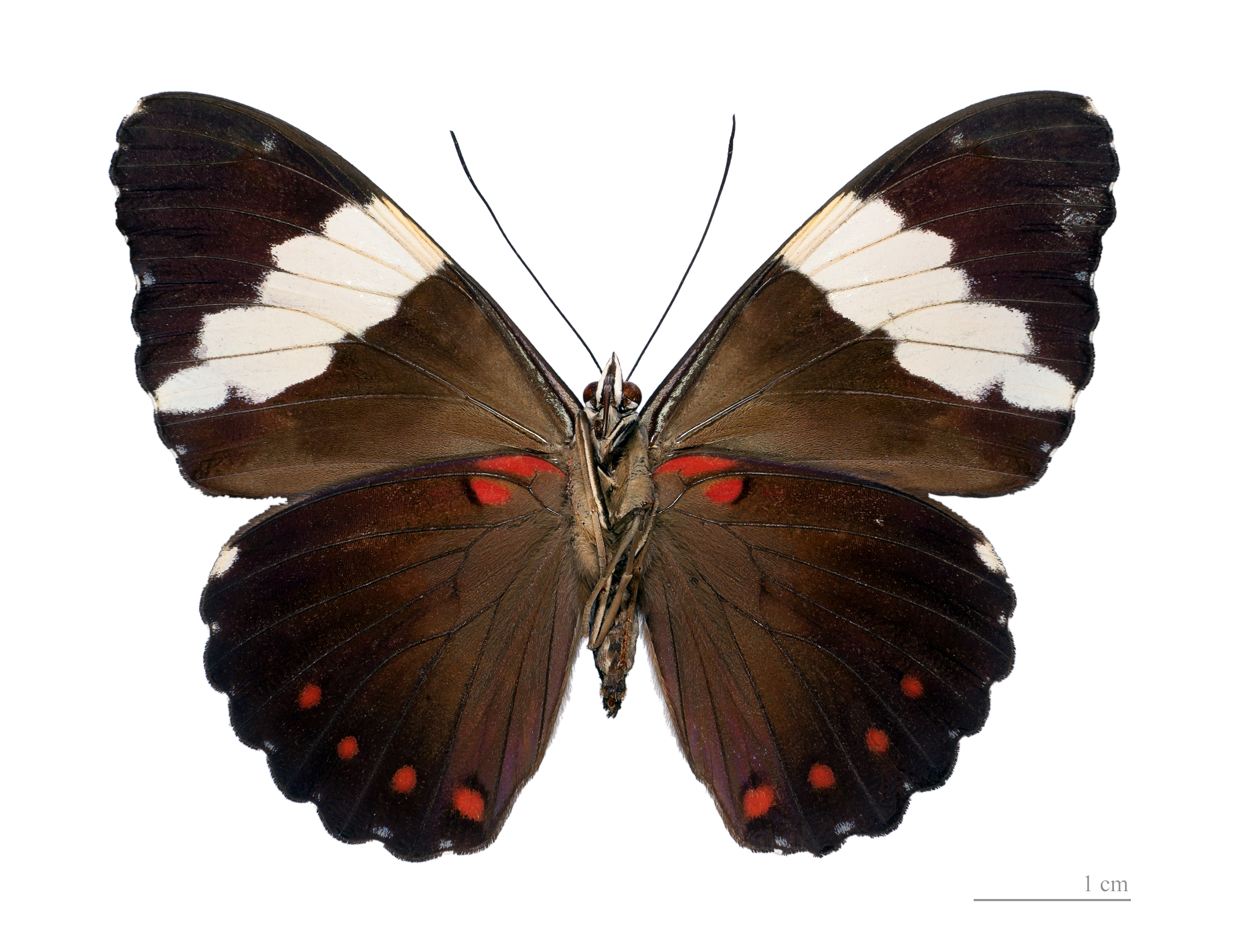
- Underside

Scientific classification
- Domain: Eukaryota
- Kingdom: Animalia
- Phylum: Arthropoda
- Class: Insecta
- Order: Lepidoptera
- Family: Nymphalidae
- Genus: Hamadryas
- Species: H. arinome

Binomial name
- Hamadryas arinome (H. Lucas, 1853)

Synonyms
- Peridromia arinome H. Lucas, 1853

= Hamadryas arinome =

Species of butterfly

Hamadryas arinome, the turquoise cracker, is a species of cracker butterfly in the family Nymphalidae. The species was first described by Hippolyte Lucas in 1853. It is found from Mexico south to the Amazon basin.

The larvae feed on Dalechampia triphylla.

== Subspecies ==
- Hamadryas arinome arinome (French Guiana, Peru, Brazil)
- Hamadryas arinome arienis (Panama, Costa Rica, Colombia)
- Hamadryas arinome obnutila (Brazil)

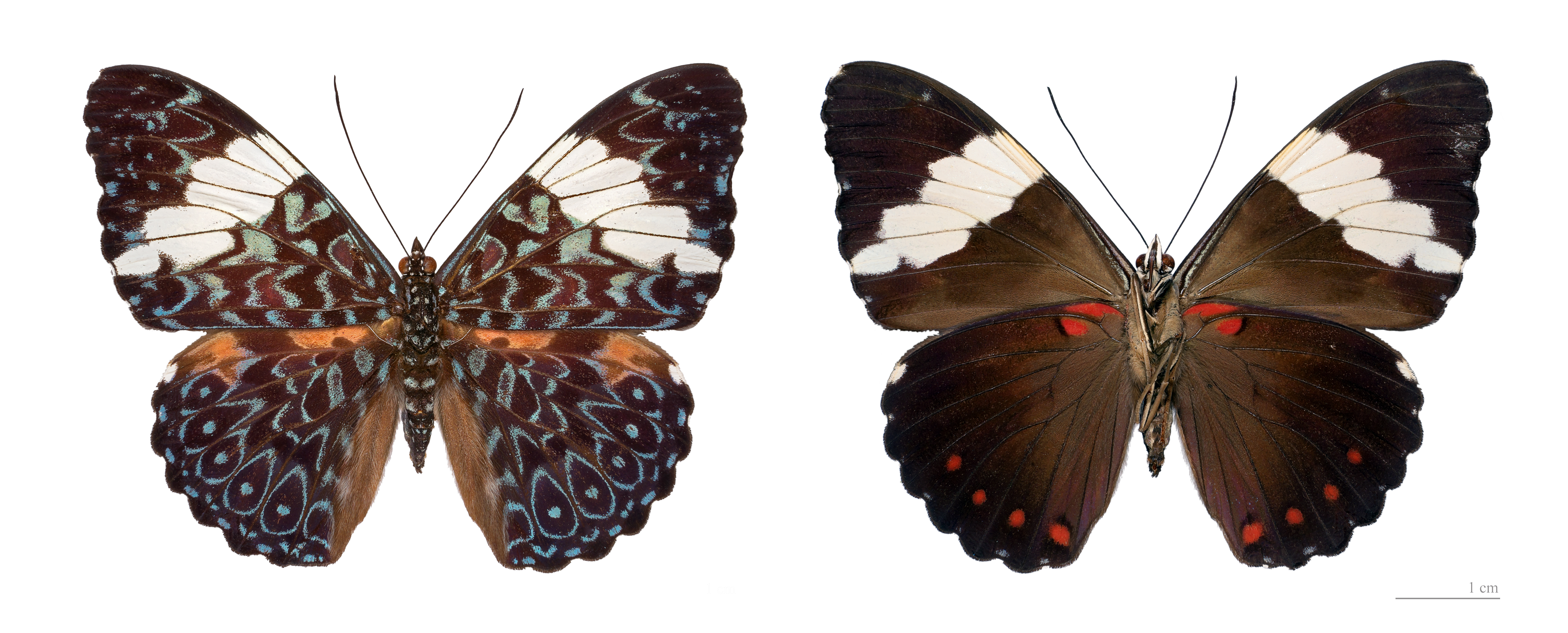
Both sides
