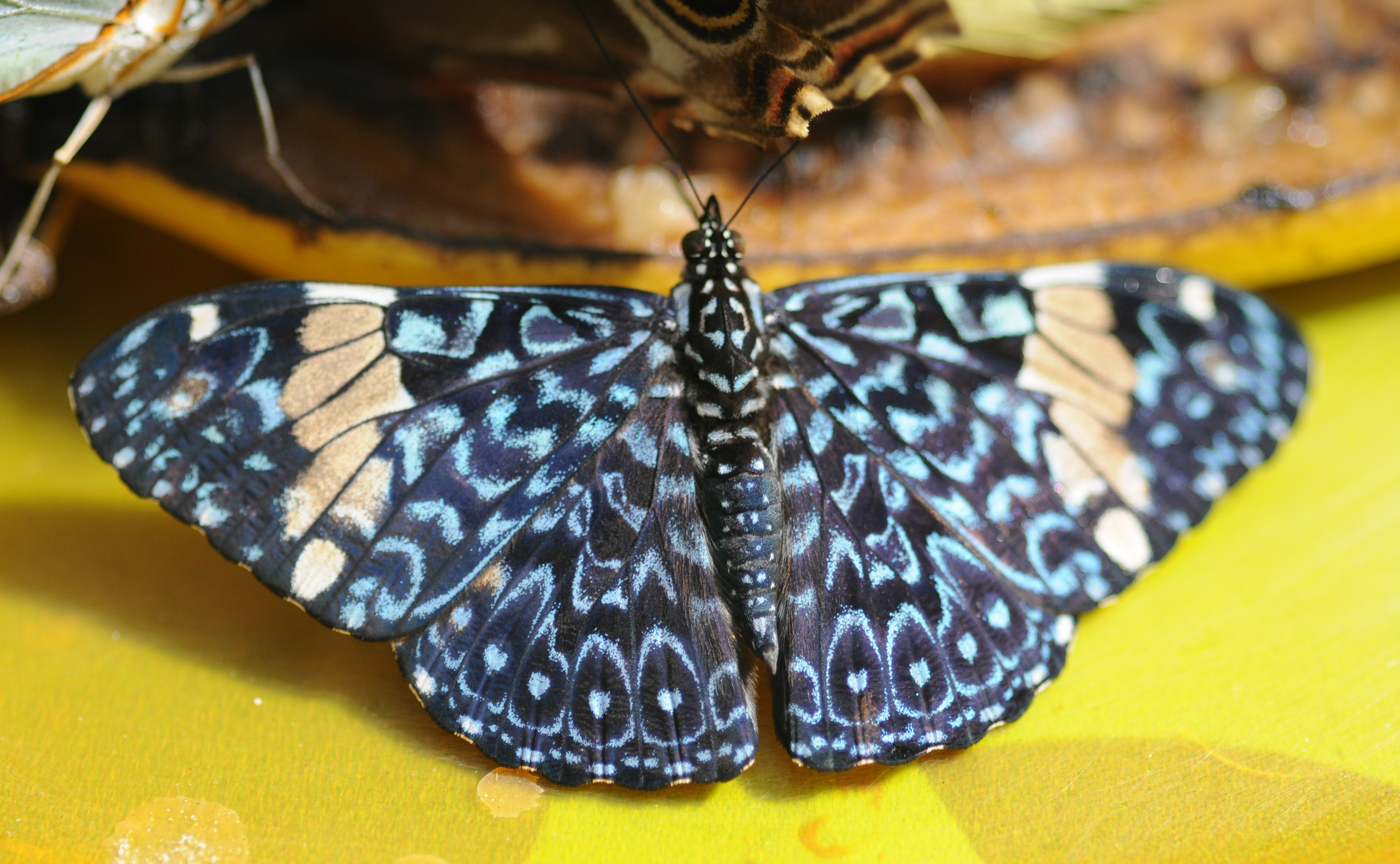

Scientific classification
- Kingdom: Animalia
- Phylum: Arthropoda
- Class: Insecta
- Order: Lepidoptera
- Family: Nymphalidae
- Genus: Hamadryas
- Species: H. amphinome

Binomial name
- Hamadryas amphinome (Linnaeus, 1767)

Synonyms
- Papilio amphinome Linnaeus, 1767

= Hamadryas amphinome =

Red cracker

Species of butterfly

Hamadryas amphinome, the red cracker, is a species of cracker butterfly in the family Nymphalidae, native to regions of North and South America.

== Distribution ==
It is found from Mexico, through the Caribbean and Central America, to the Amazon basin including in Brazil, Colombia, Guianas, Peru, and Bolivia, and south into Argentina.

== Subspecies ==
Subspecies of Hamadryas amphinome, listed alphabetically, include:

- Hamadryas amphinome amphinome (Colombia, Bolivia, Brazil)
- Hamadryas amphinome fumosa (Colombia)
- Hamadryas amphinome mazai (Mexico)
- Hamadryas amphinome mexicana (Mexico to Colombia)
- Hamadryas amphinome mexicana (Costa Rica )
- most abundant on the Pacific slope of Costa Rica

== Food source ==
The larvae feed on Dalechampia scandens.

== Gallery ==
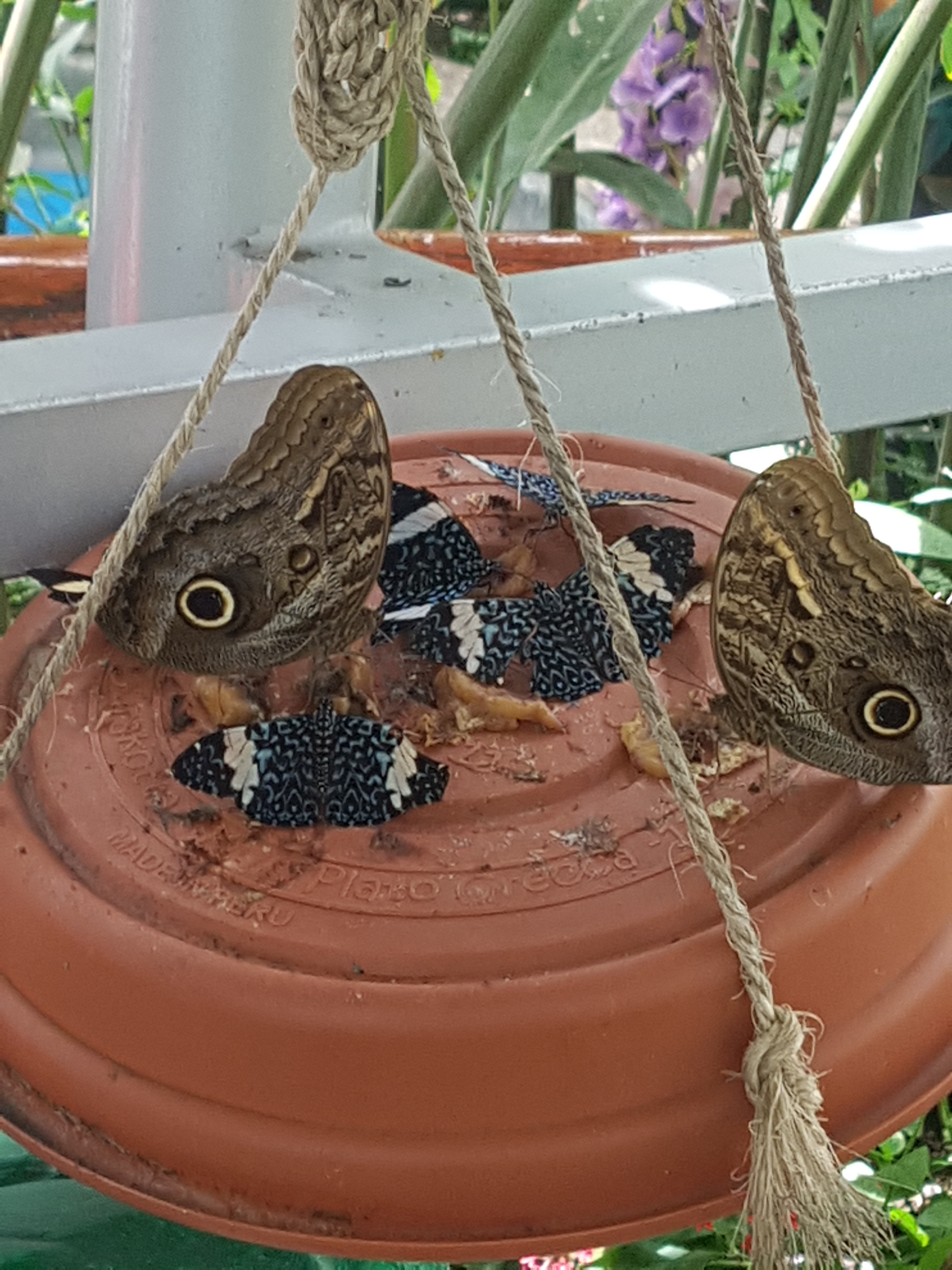
Hamdrays and Giant Owl butterflies at a feeder

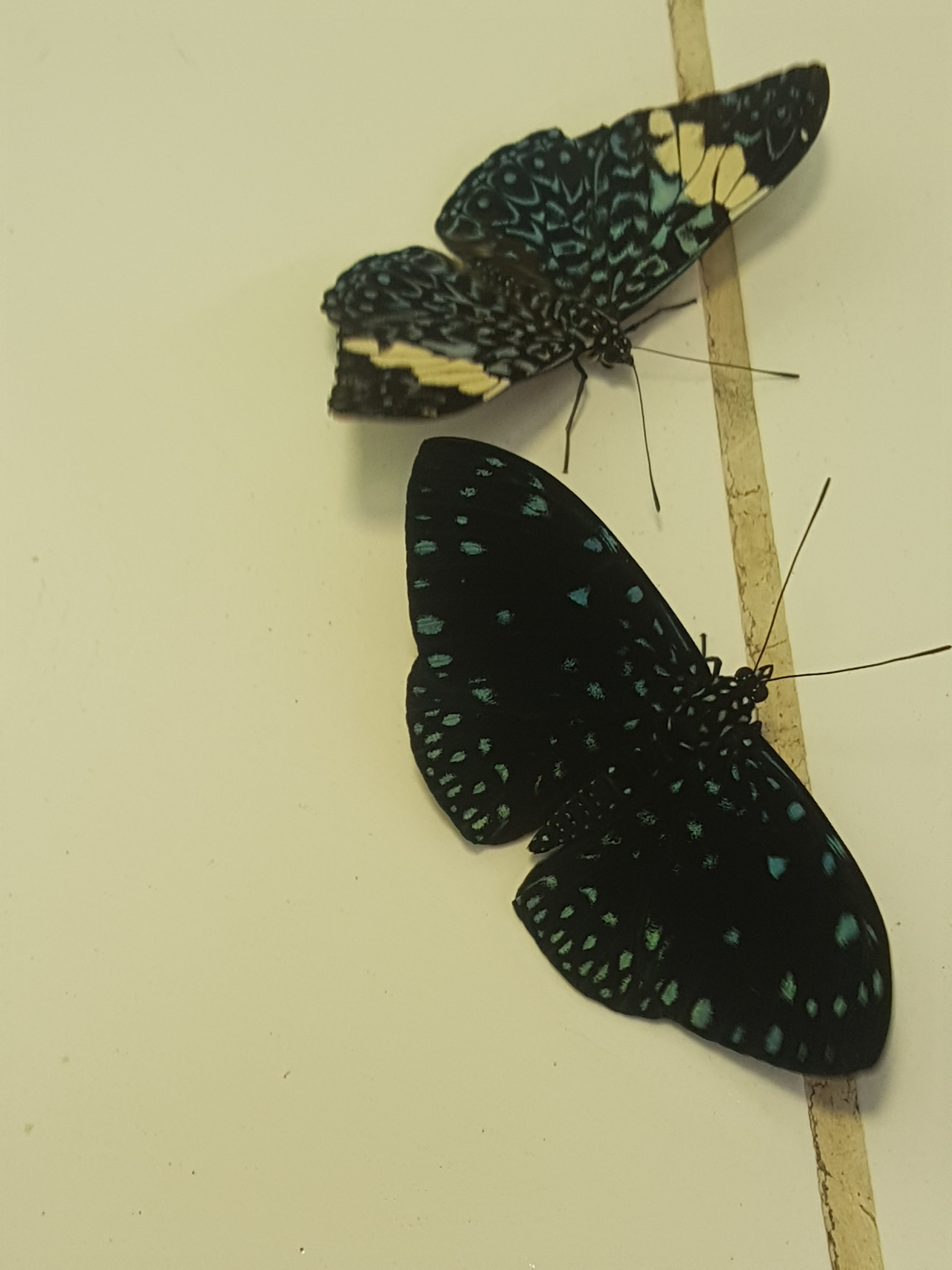
Red Cracker and Starry night Cracker butterflies

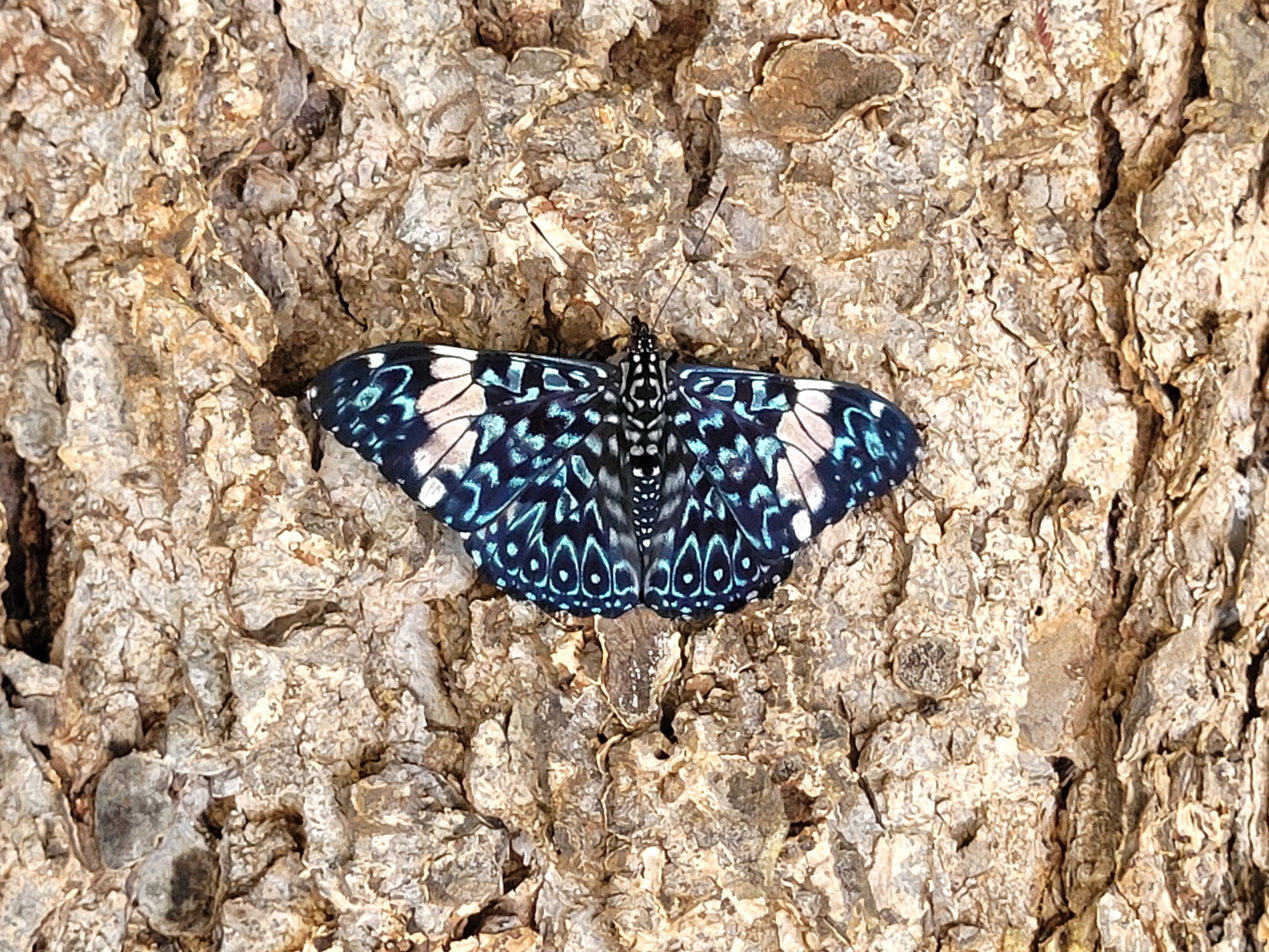
Red Cracker perched on a tree
