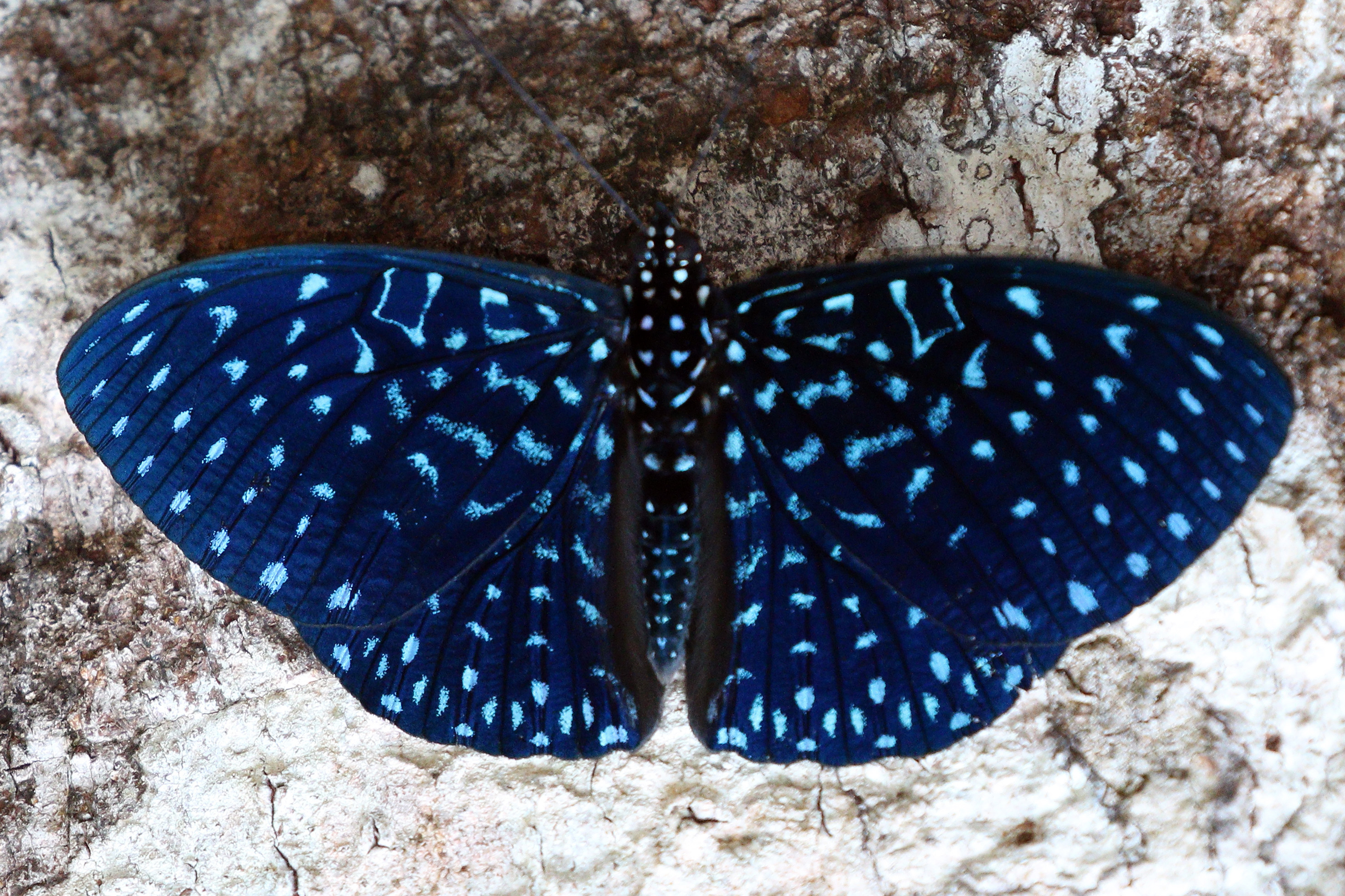
- Cristalino River, Southern Amazon, Brazil

Scientific classification
- Domain: Eukaryota
- Kingdom: Animalia
- Phylum: Arthropoda
- Class: Insecta
- Order: Lepidoptera
- Family: Nymphalidae
- Genus: Hamadryas
- Species: H. velutina

Binomial name
- Hamadryas velutina Bates, 1865

= Hamadryas velutina =

Species of butterfly

Hamadryas velutina, the velutina cracker, is a butterfly of the family Nymphalidae. It is found in the Amazon basin.

The wingspan is about 36 mm.
