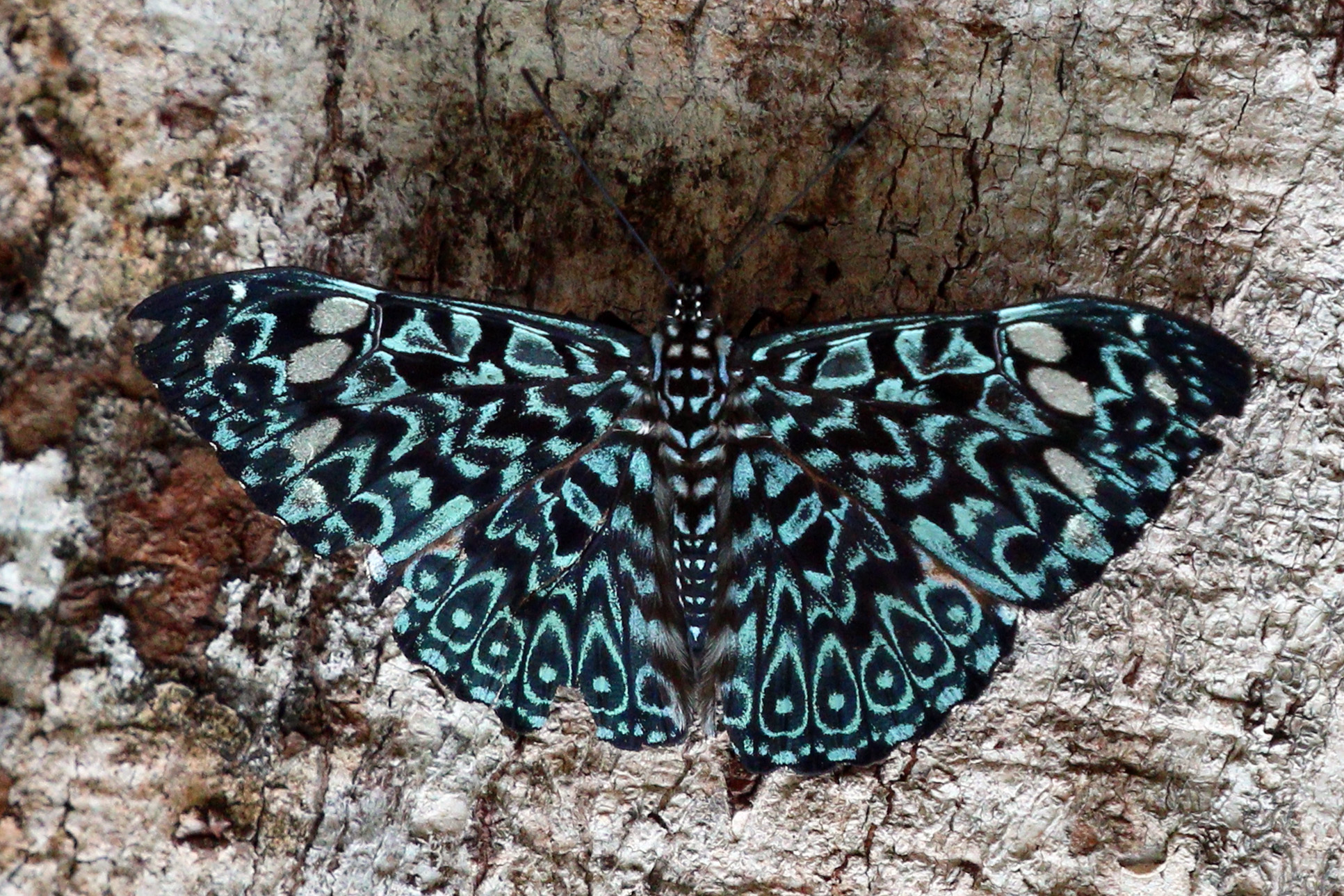
- Near the Cristalino River, Southern Amazon, Brazil

Scientific classification
- Domain: Eukaryota
- Kingdom: Animalia
- Phylum: Arthropoda
- Class: Insecta
- Order: Lepidoptera
- Family: Nymphalidae
- Genus: Hamadryas
- Species: H. belladonna

Binomial name
- Hamadryas belladonna (Bates, 1865)

Synonyms
- Ageronia belladonna Bates, 1865

= Hamadryas belladonna =

Belladonna cracker

Species of butterfly

Hamadryas belladonna, the belladonna cracker, is a species of cracker butterfly in the family Nymphalidae. It is endemic to Brazil.
