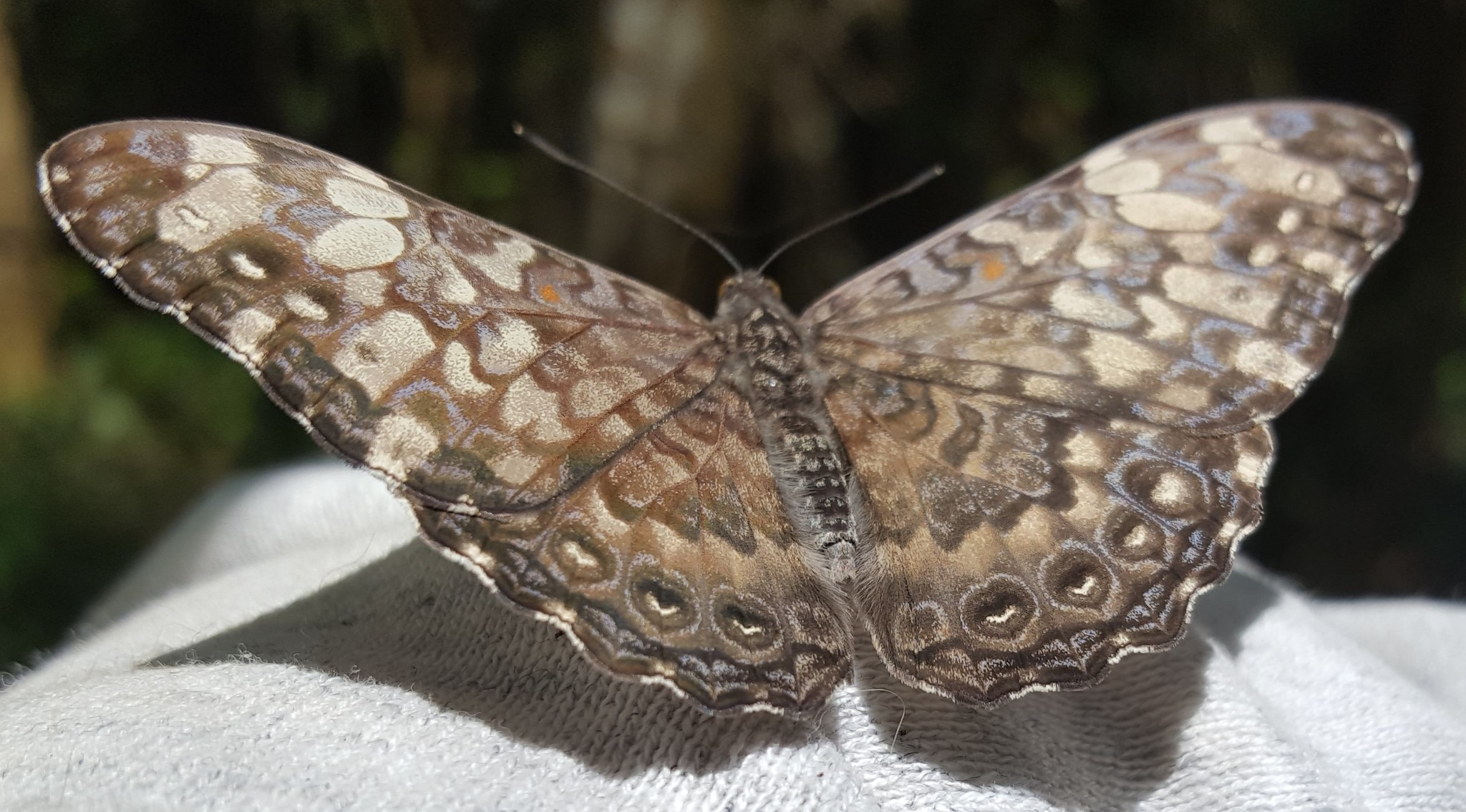
- H. epinome in Brazil

Scientific classification
- Kingdom: Animalia
- Phylum: Arthropoda
- Class: Insecta
- Order: Lepidoptera
- Family: Nymphalidae
- Genus: Hamadryas
- Species: H. epinome

Binomial name
- Hamadryas epinome (Felder & Felder, 1867)

Synonyms
- Ageronia epinome C. & R. Felder, 1867; Ageronia fallax Staudinger, 1886; Ageronia epinome florentia Fruhstorfer, 1916; Ageronia epinome aldrina Martin, [1923]; Peridromia epinome argentina Bryk, 1953

= Hamadryas epinome =

Epinome cracker

Species of butterfly

Hamadryas epinome, the epinome cracker, is a species of butterfly believed to have originated from Paraguay and also found in a number of other South American countries including Argentina, Brazil, Peru, and Uruguay.

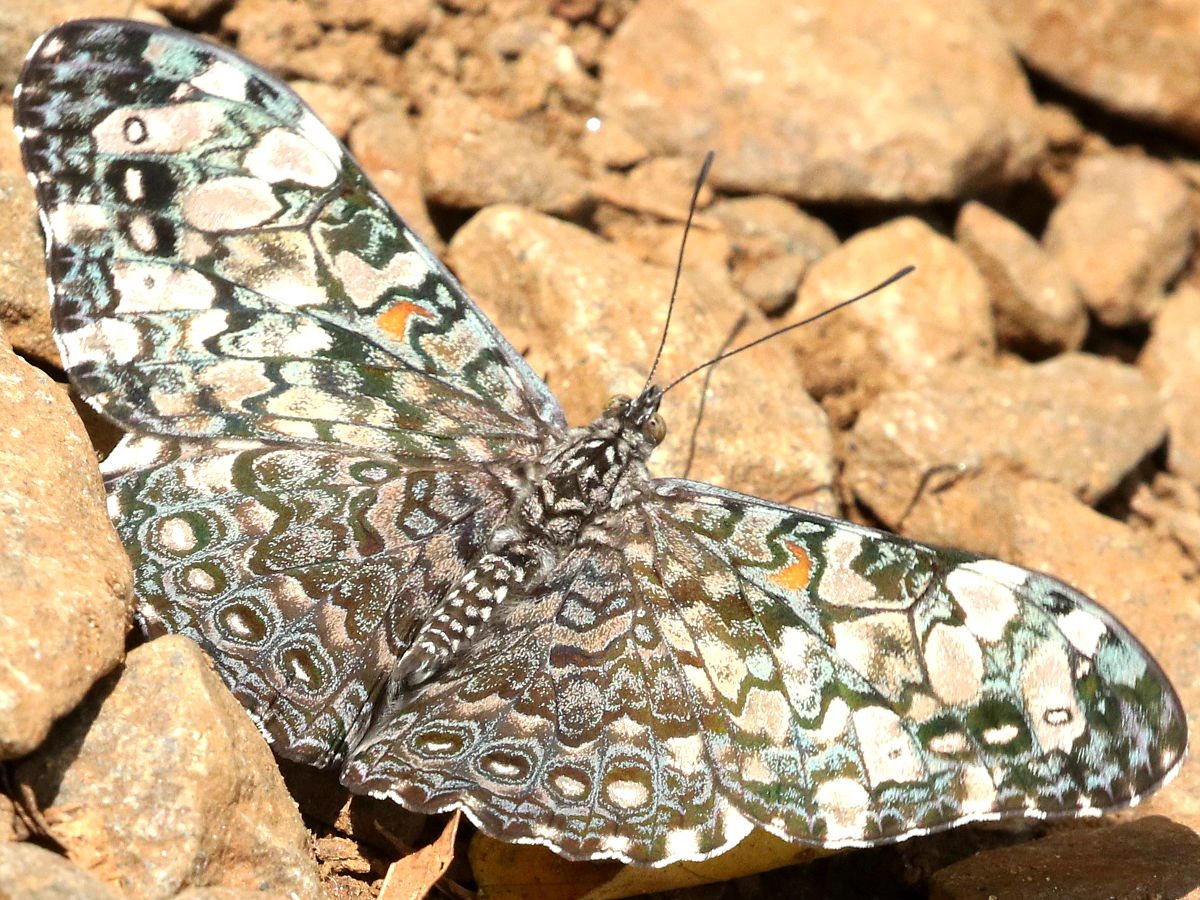
Iguazu Falls, Brazil
