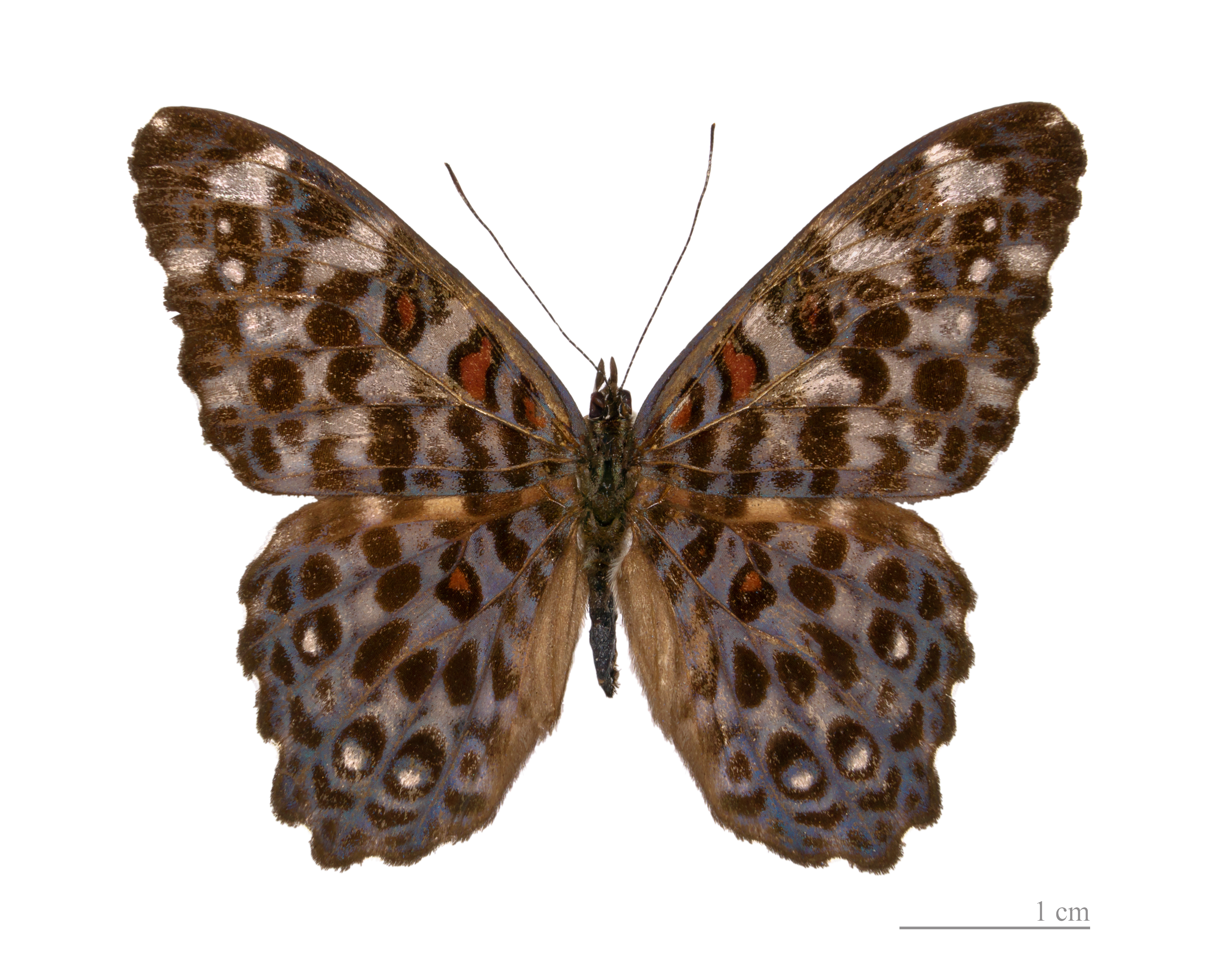
- From MHNT
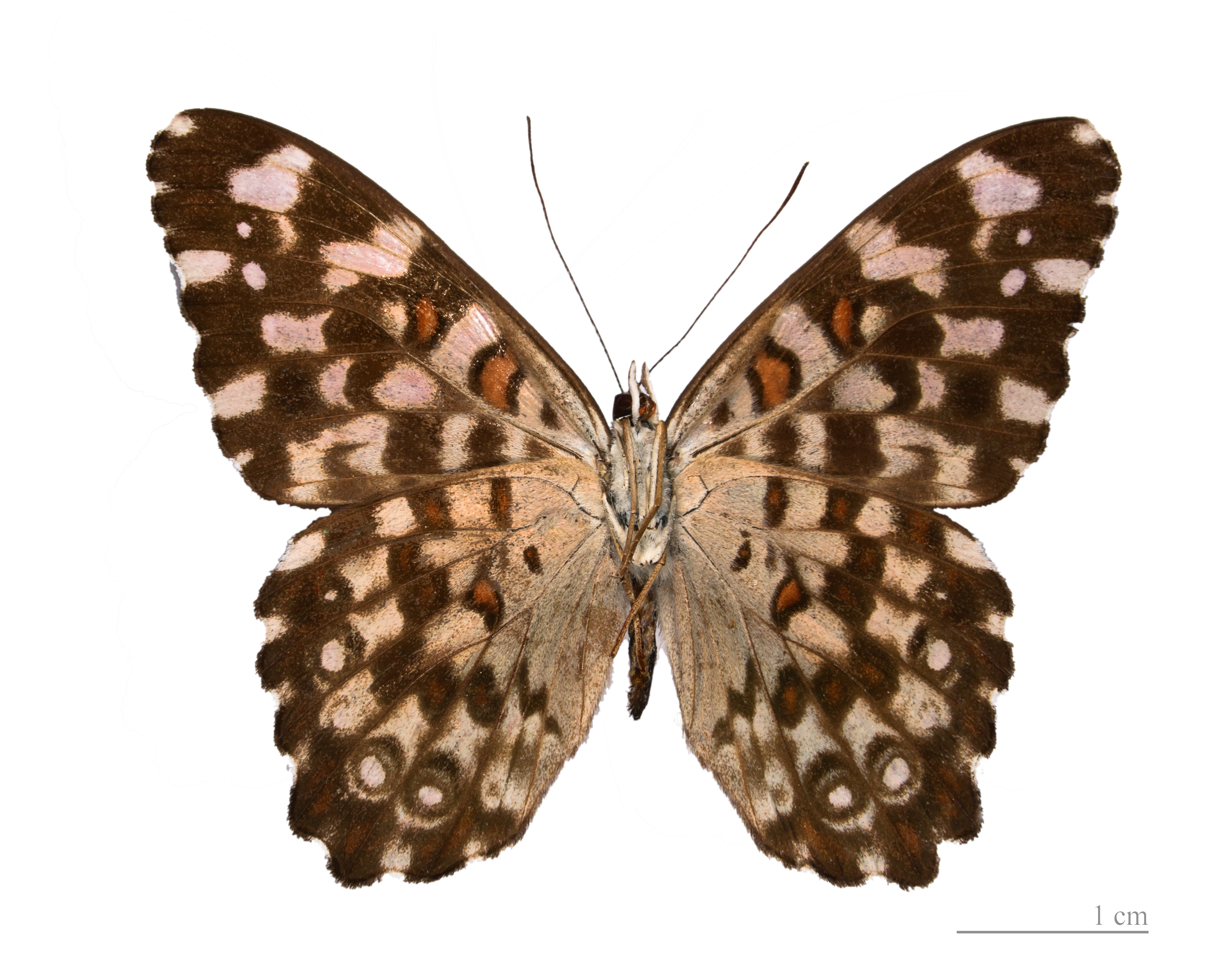
- Underside

Scientific classification
- Kingdom: Animalia
- Phylum: Arthropoda
- Class: Insecta
- Order: Lepidoptera
- Family: Nymphalidae
- Genus: Hamadryas
- Species: H. chloe

Binomial name
- Hamadryas chloe (Stoll, 1787)

Synonyms
- Papilio chloe Stoll, 1787

= Hamadryas chloe =

Species of butterfly

Hamadryas chloe, the Chloe cracker, is a species of cracker butterfly in the family Nymphalidae. It is found in Suriname, Peru, Colombia, Bolivia, and Brazil.

== Subspecies ==
- Hamadryas chloe chloe (Surinam, Peru, Colombia)
- Hamadryas chloe daphnis (Peru, Bolivia)
- Hamadryas chloe rhea (Brazil)
- Hamadryas chloe obidona (Brazil)
