= Hamadryas albicornis =

Scientific classification
- Kingdom: Animalia
- Phylum: Arthropoda
- Clade: Pancrustacea
- Class: Insecta
- Order: Lepidoptera
- Family: Nymphalidae
- Genus: Hamadryas
- Species: H. albicornis

Binomial name
- Hamadryas albicornis (Staudinger, [1885])

Synonyms
- Ageronia albicornis Staudinger, [1885]

Species of butterfly

Hamadryas albicornis is a species of cracker butterfly in the family Nymphalidae. It is found in Peru.
