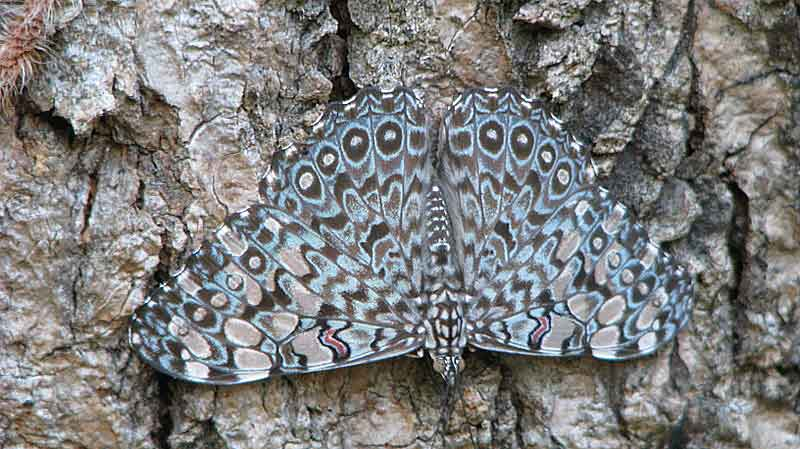

Scientific classification
- Domain: Eukaryota
- Kingdom: Animalia
- Phylum: Arthropoda
- Class: Insecta
- Order: Lepidoptera
- Family: Nymphalidae
- Genus: Hamadryas
- Species: H. iphthime

Binomial name
- Hamadryas iphthime (Bates, 1864)

Synonyms
- Ageronia iphthime Bates, 1864; Ageronia iphthime gervasia Fruhstorfer, 1916; Ageronia iphthime aternia Fruhstorfer, 1916; Ageronia ipthime itania Martin, [1923]; Peridromia epinome lindmani Bryk, 1953

= Hamadryas iphthime =

Ringless blue cracker

Species of butterfly

Hamadryas iphthime, the ringless blue cracker or brownish cracker, is a species of cracker butterfly in the family Nymphalidae. It was first described by Henry Walter Bates in 1864. It is found in Mexico, Central America and parts of northern South America.

== Description ==
The wingspan of the ringless blue cracker is approximately 7.5 cm (3 in). The upper surface of the wings is mottled grey, brown and white. There is no red bar on the forewing and the hindwing has submarginal black spots, surrounded by blue, brown and blue rings, and with a central white crescent or oval. The under surface of the wings is whitish, with black rings near the hind margin that resemble those of Hamadryas feronia.

The larvae are black with fine longitudinal yellow lines, which may be indistinct, pale spines and two horns on the head. The pupae are bright green with some bands of white and a silvery rim to the yellowish-green wings. The heads of the pupae have a pair of elongated "rabbit ears", green with a white seam, forming a V-shape.

== Distribution and habitat ==
The range of the ringless blue cracker extends from Mexico, through Costa Rica and Panama, to Guyana, Colombia, Peru, Bolivia and southern Brazil, with a single individual being reported as a vagrant in Texas. This butterfly occurs in glades and on the edges of tropical forests. The larvae feed on vines in the family Euphorbiaceae, Dalechampia triphylla, Dalechampia ficifolia and Dalechampia stipulacea being host plants in Brazil, and Dalechampia cissifolia in Panama.

== Ecology ==
The eggs are laid on the underside of leaves of the host plant and the larvae feed on the leaves and are not gregarious. They rest in an unusual position with only the prolegs touching the leaf blade, and the head with their horns projecting forward. The adults feed on rotting fruit and do not visit flowers. They have a habit of perching on the trunks of trees in a head-down position with their wings spread out in close contact with the bark. When another butterfly approaches, a male will dart away from the trunk, making a cracking sound. This appears to be a mechanism that helps males to distinguish the sex of the new arrival; males will click in response while females remain silent. At night the butterflies roost separately among foliage. In the tropics, the adults are on the wing most of the year. In Mexico, they are most frequently seen during July and August.

== Subspecies ==
- H. iphthime iphthime (Costa Rica to Colombia, Brazil [Rio Grande do Sul, Mato Grosso], Bolivia)
- H. iphthime joannae Jenkins, 1983 (Mexico)
