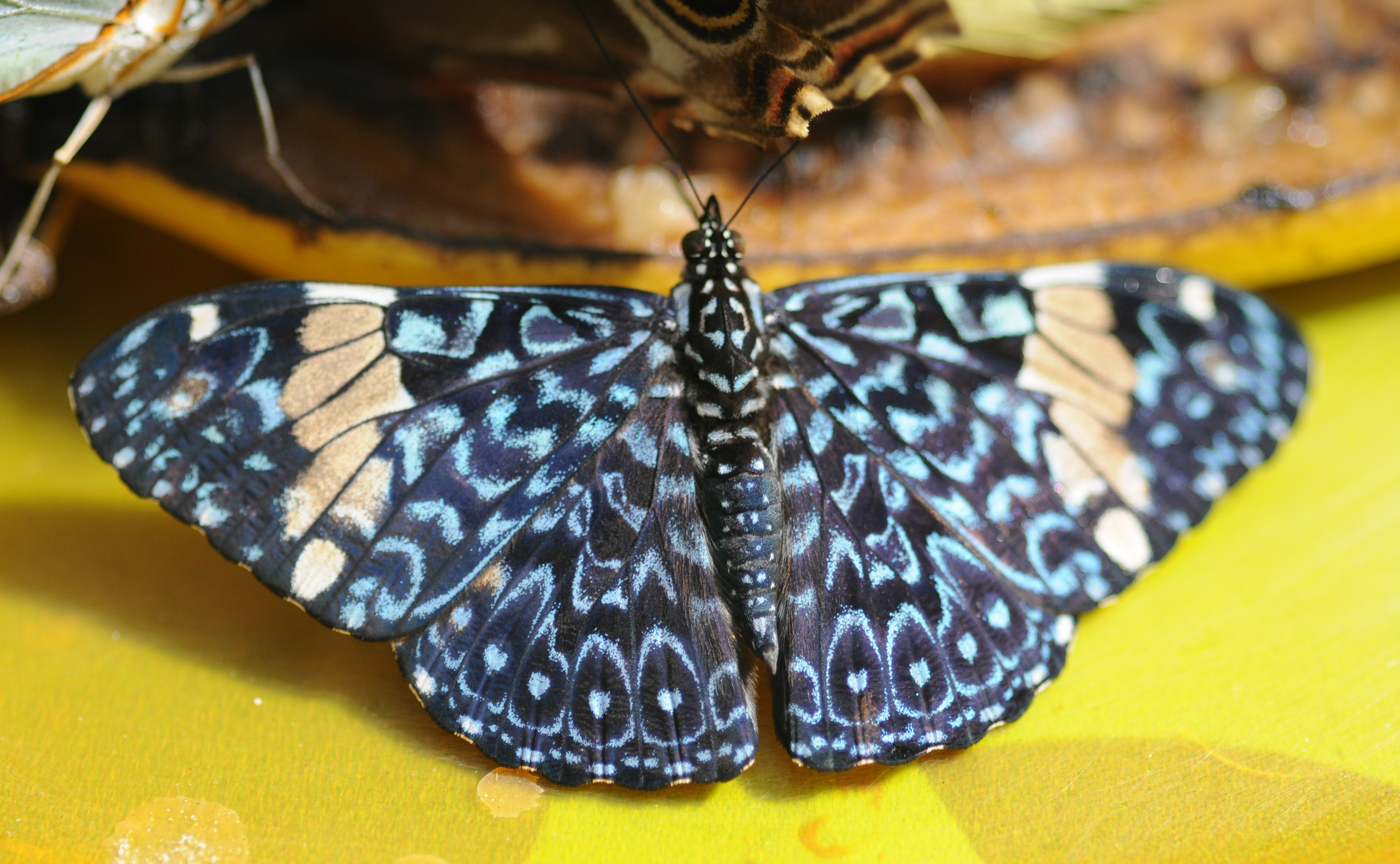
- Hamadryas amphinome (red cracker)

Scientific classification
- Kingdom: Animalia
- Phylum: Arthropoda
- Clade: Pancrustacea
- Class: Insecta
- Order: Lepidoptera
- Family: Nymphalidae
- Tribe: Ageroniini
- Genus: Hamadryas; Hübner, 1806

Type species
- Papilio amphinome Linnaeus, 1767

Diversity
- About 20 species

Synonyms
- Ageronia Hübner, 1819; Amphichlora Felder, 1861; Apatura Illiger, 1807 (non Fabricius, 1807: suppressed); Peridromia Lacordaire, 1833; Peridromia Boisduval, 1836 (non Lacordaire, 1833: preoccupied); Philocala Billberg, 1820

= Hamadryas (butterfly) =

Cracker butterflies

Genus of brush-footed butterflies

Hamadryas is a genus of medium-sized, neotropical, brush-footed butterfly species commonly known as cracker butterflies. They acquired their common name due to the unusual way that males produce a "cracking" sound as part of their territorial displays. The most comprehensive work about their ecology and behavior is that of Julian Monge Najera et al. (1998). The genus was erected by Jacob Hübner in 1806.

== Description ==
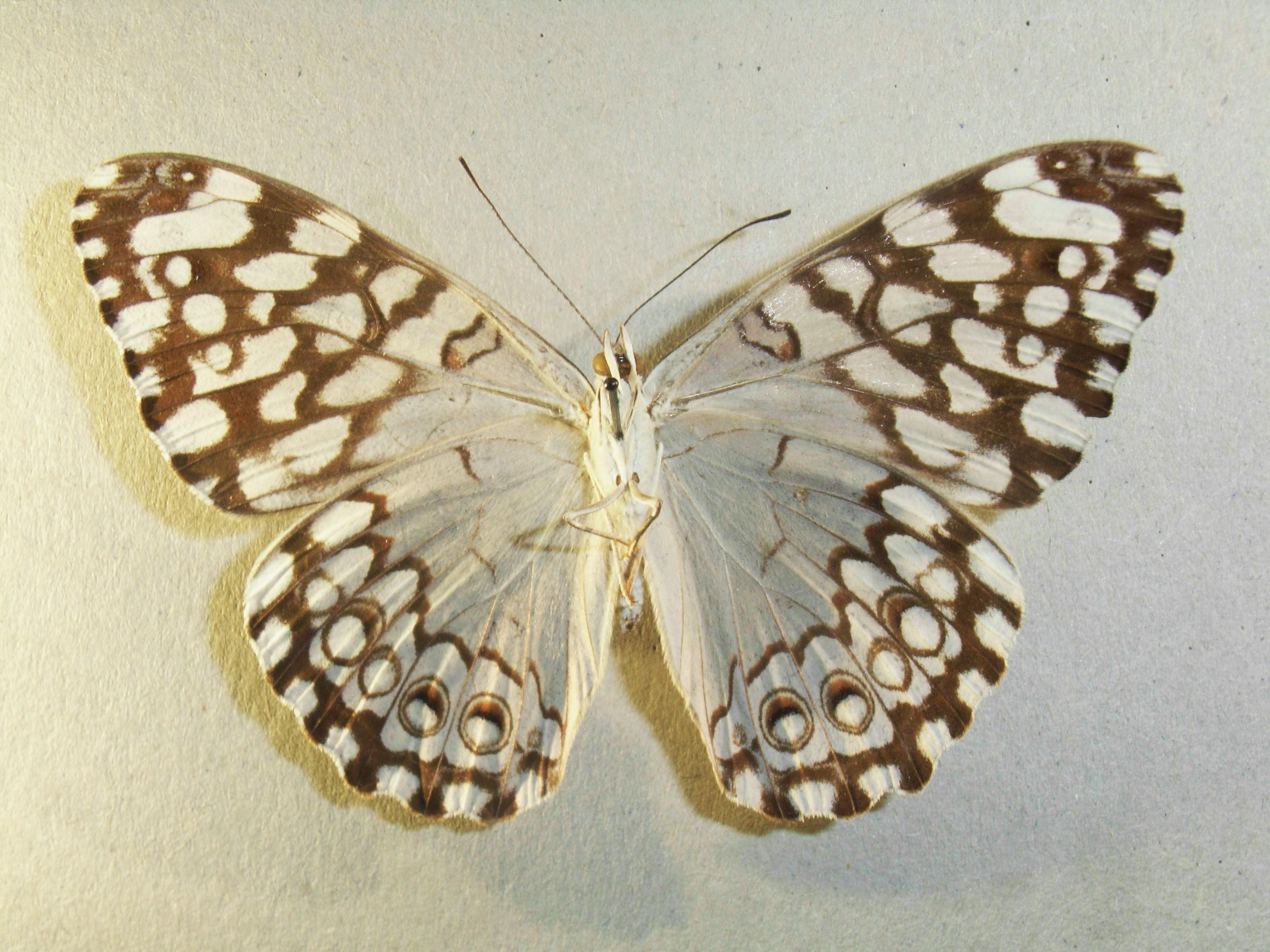
Underwing pattern of Hamadryas epinome museum specimen

Cracker butterflies are all fairly cryptic in their dorsal coloration, commonly covered in varying colored spots, most of which resemble bark; some are known to have little coloration, such as the Hamadryas februa.

== Distribution and habitat ==
This genus of butterflies are commonly found throughout South America to Arizona, where at least nine species can be found in Costa Rica.

They spend most of the day perching on trees, boulders, and other such surfaces against which they are camouflaged. The speckled species of Hamadryas are often hard to distinguish, and most often these butterflies have to be examined as set specimens. There are no recent revisions, but a general account was published by D.W. Jenkins.

Since cracker butterflies have good camouflage, they are not poisonous and do not have a chemical defense, with the exception of the starry night cracker. They are fed upon by rufous-tailed jacamars.

== Behavior ==
Male cracker butterflies are known for their ability to make a cracking noise with their wings, which is believed to either be for mating or to ward off rival males. They use trees as courting territories, as shown by experiments. They prefer to perch on trees with bark that matches their wing coloration, while the presence of food, position of trees along flight routes, tree size, bark texture, and lichen cover are not associated with the frequency of perching on the trees.

Each species has a height range when perching but they perch higher when night approaches. The northern side of trees is less used and cardinal-direction side distribution is independent of time of day. Perches exposed to direct sunlight are less used in hot days. All species perch with the head downwards. Perching males frequently fly towards other butterflies.

Each male perches on one to four trees daily, without difference between seasons, and each tree used has a minimum daily mean of 1.5 perching butterflies. Most interactions occur from 13:00 through 15:00 hours and are more frequent in the rainy season. At night males share perches.

At least seven locations have been proposed for the sonic mechanism of Hamadryas butterflies. Non-destructive experimental methods and scanning electron microscopy suggest that both sexes emit sound and the sound apparatus, located in the forewing, is percussive, not stridulatory. At the end of the upward wing stroke, the wings are clapped and modified r-veins meet at a speed of approximately 1420 mm/s, producing the characteristic clicks. Wing beat frequency of free-flying individuals is 20–29 Hz. Clicks last a mean of 1.38 ms with mean intervals of 43.74 ms and the component frequencies concentrate around 2.4 kHz, matching Hamadryas hearing capacity and being appropriate for the acoustic conditions of habitat.

The swollen Sc vein is present exclusively in Hamadryas; has a serpentine structure inside and probably acts as resonance box. Growth of the sound apparatus may be checked by its effect on flight capacity, physiological costs, and ecological reasons.

All Hamadryas have a membrane, shaped as an elongated cupola, in the costal cell, that acts as an ear. A second and smaller ear has four chambers and may detect predatory bats when the insects are perching at night.

In the field, Hamadryas emit audible clicks when approached by potential predators, to defend territories from other Hamadryas and in at least one species also during courtship. Severe wing damage, common in wild Hamadryas, almost never affects the section with the sound mechanism. More than 50 species of lepidopterans (11 families) emit sound which can be audible to humans 30 meters (100 ft) away. In general, lepidopteran sound is used as a warning to predators and for intraspecific communication.

Research has shown that cracker butterflies can also detect the sounds made by other butterflies, which would be a form of social communication. The organ of hearing is believed by some to be Vogel's organ, located at the base of the forewing subcostal and cubital veins.

However, they may actually have a larger hearing organ for lower sound wave frequencies.

=== Food sources ===
Unlike most butterflies, these species don't feed on nectar. Instead, cracker butterflies feed on rotting fruit, sap from leguminous trees, and animal dung.

=== Life cycle ===
Cracker butterflies undergo metamorphosis just like any other species of Lepidoptera, but lay their eggs only on the host plants that are members of the euphorbia family, Dalechampia spp.

== Species ==
The following species are usually included in this genus:

- Hamadryas albicornis (Staudinger, [1885])
- Hamadryas alicia (Bates, 1865)
- Hamadryas amphichloe (Boisduval, 1870)
- Hamadryas amphinome (Linnaeus, 1767) – red cracker
- Hamadryas arete (Doubleday, 1847)
- Hamadryas arethusa (Cramer, 1775)
- Hamadryas arinome (H. Lucas, 1853) – arinome cracker
- Hamadryas atlantis (Bates, 1864) – black-patched cracker
- Hamadryas belladonna (Bates, 1865) – belladonna cracker
- Hamadryas chloe (Stoll, [1787]) – Chloe cracker
- Hamadryas epinome (Felder & R. Felder, 1867) – epinome cracker
- Hamadryas februa (Hübner, [1823]) – grey cracker, Ferentina calico
- Hamadryas feronia (Linnaeus, 1758) – variable cracker
- Hamadryas fornax (Hübner, [1823]) – orange cracker
- Hamadryas glauconome (Bates, 1864) – glaucous cracker
- Hamadryas guatemalena (Bates, 1864) – Guatemalan cracker, Guatemalan calico
- Hamadryas honorina (Fruhstorfer, 1916)
- Hamadryas iphthime (Bates, 1864) – ringless blue cracker, Iphthime cracker, brownish cracker
- Hamadryas julitta (Fruhstorfer, 1914) – Yucatán cracker
- Hamadryas laodamia (Cramer, [1777]) – starry night cracker, starry cracker
- Hamadryas rosandra (Fruhstorfer, 1916)
- Hamadryas velutina (Bates, 1865) – velutina cracker
