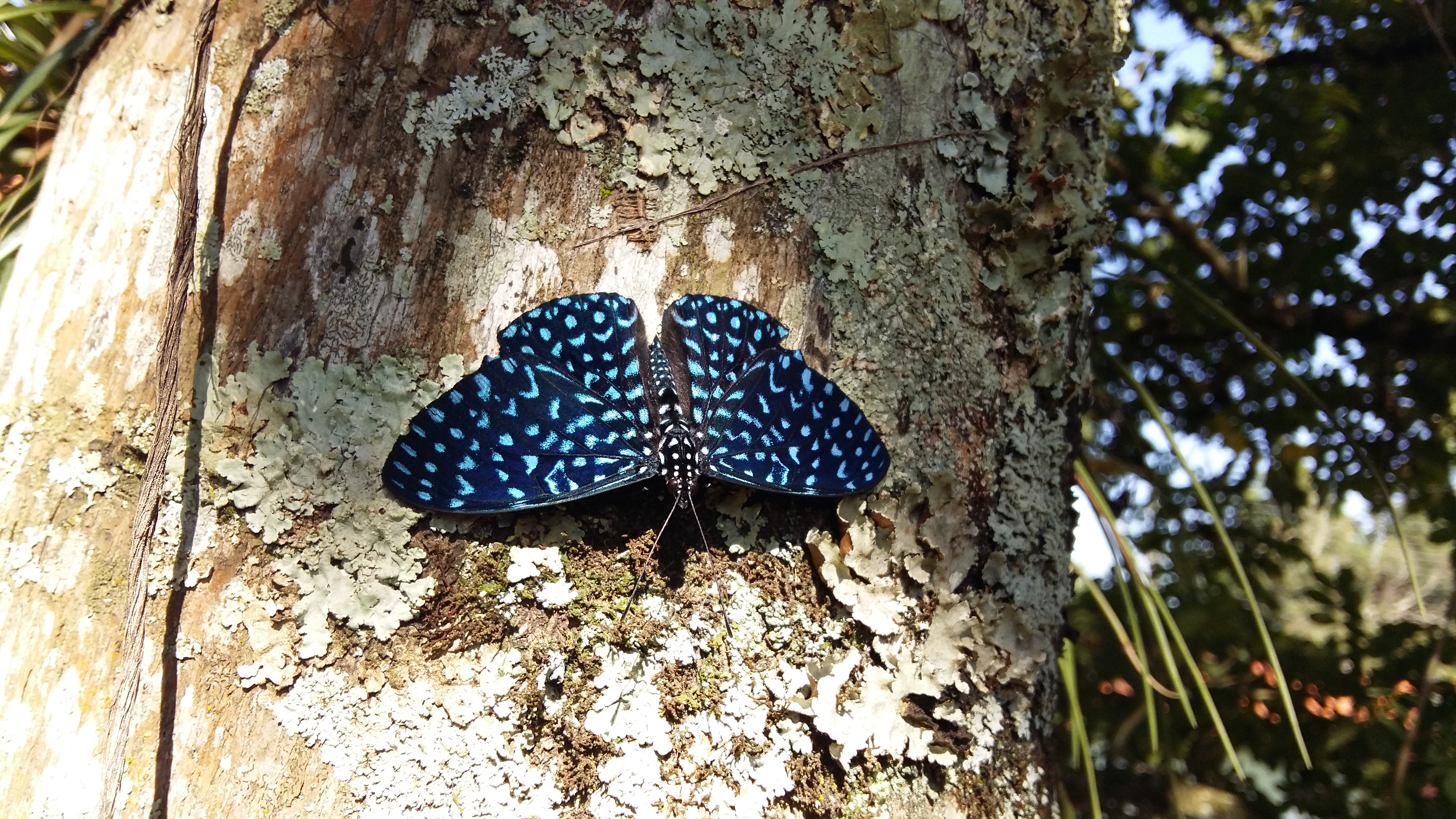

Scientific classification
- Domain: Eukaryota
- Kingdom: Animalia
- Phylum: Arthropoda
- Class: Insecta
- Order: Lepidoptera
- Family: Nymphalidae
- Genus: Hamadryas
- Species: H. arete

Binomial name
- Hamadryas arete (Doubleday, 1847)

Synonyms
- Ageronia arete Doubleday, 1847; Peridromia alpheios Fruhstorfer, 1915; Ageronia arete ortygia Fruhstorfer, 1916

= Hamadryas arete =

Species of butterfly

Hamadryas arete is a species of cracker butterfly in the family Nymphalidae. It is found in Bolivia, Brazil, and Paraguay.
