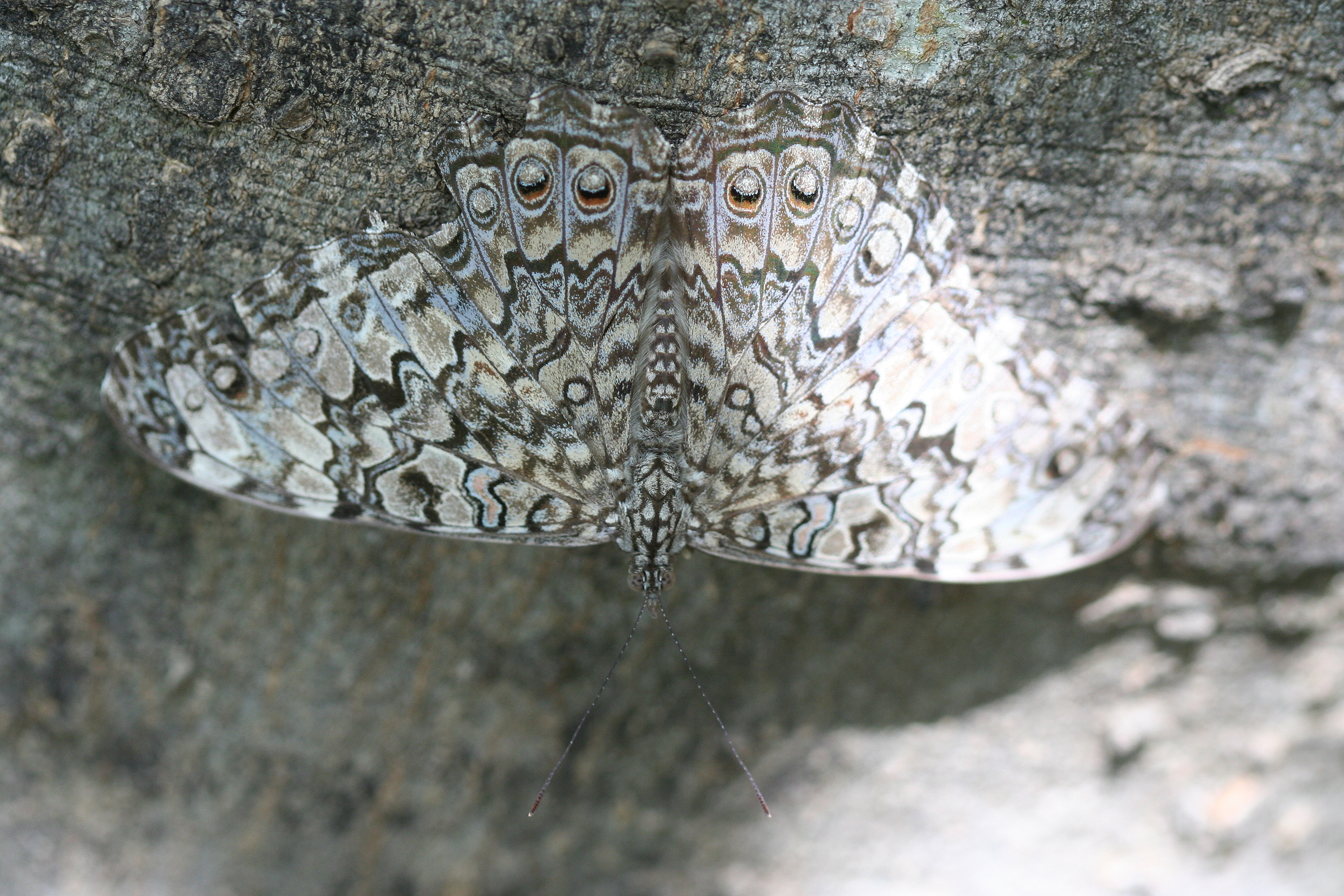

Scientific classification
- Kingdom: Animalia
- Phylum: Arthropoda
- Clade: Pancrustacea
- Class: Insecta
- Order: Lepidoptera
- Family: Nymphalidae
- Genus: Hamadryas
- Species: H. februa

Binomial name
- Hamadryas februa (Hübner, [1823])

Synonyms
- Ageronia februa Hübner, [1823]; Ageronia atinia Fruhstorfer, 1914; Ageronia februa sabatia Fruhstorfer, 1916; Ageronia februa sellasia Fruhstorfer, 1916; Ageronia ferox maina Martin, [1923]; Nymphalis ferentina Godart, [1824]; Ageronia gudula Fruhstorfer, 1914; Ageronia februa icilia Fruhstorfer, 1916; Ageronia februa f. sodalia Fruhstorfer, 1916; Ageronia februa hierone Fruhstorfer, 1916; Ageronia februa fundania Fruhstorfer, 1916

= Hamadryas februa =

Gray cracker

Species of butterfly

Hamadryas februa, the gray (or grey) cracker, is a species of cracker butterfly in the family Nymphalidae. It is found from Argentina north through tropical America to Mexico. Rare strays can be found up to the lower Rio Grande Valley in southern Texas. The habitat consists of subtropical forests, forest edges and cultivated areas with trees.

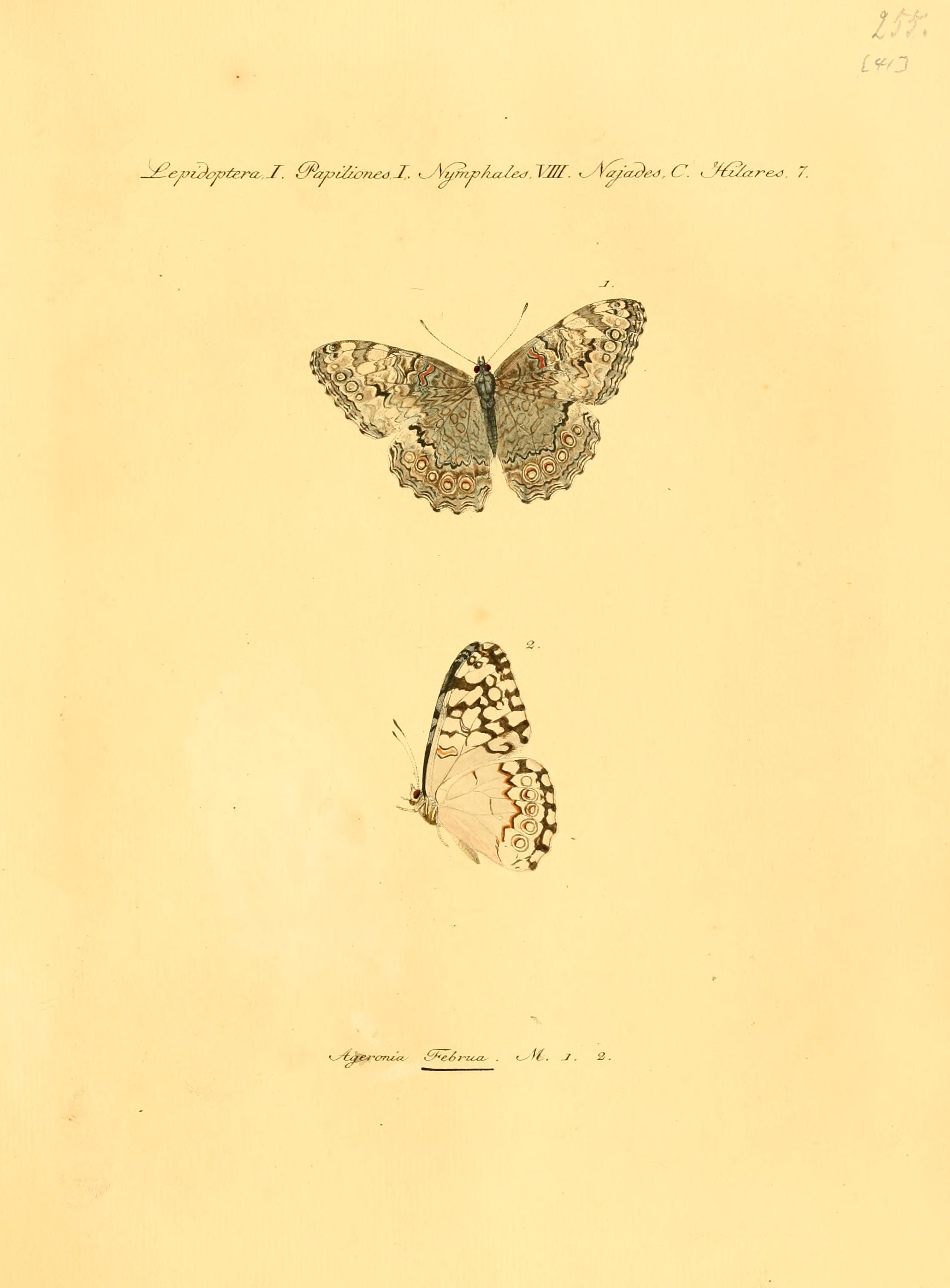
Plate accompanying Hübner's original description

The wingspan is 70–86 mm. Adults are on wing year round in the tropics and from August to October in southern Texas. They feed on sap and rotting fruit.

The larvae feed on Dalechampia and Tragia species.

== Subspecies ==
- Hamadryas februa februa (Brazil, Paraguay, Peru)
- Hamadryas februa ferentina (Godart, [1824]) (southern Texas, Mexico, Honduras, Trinidad) – Ferentina calico
