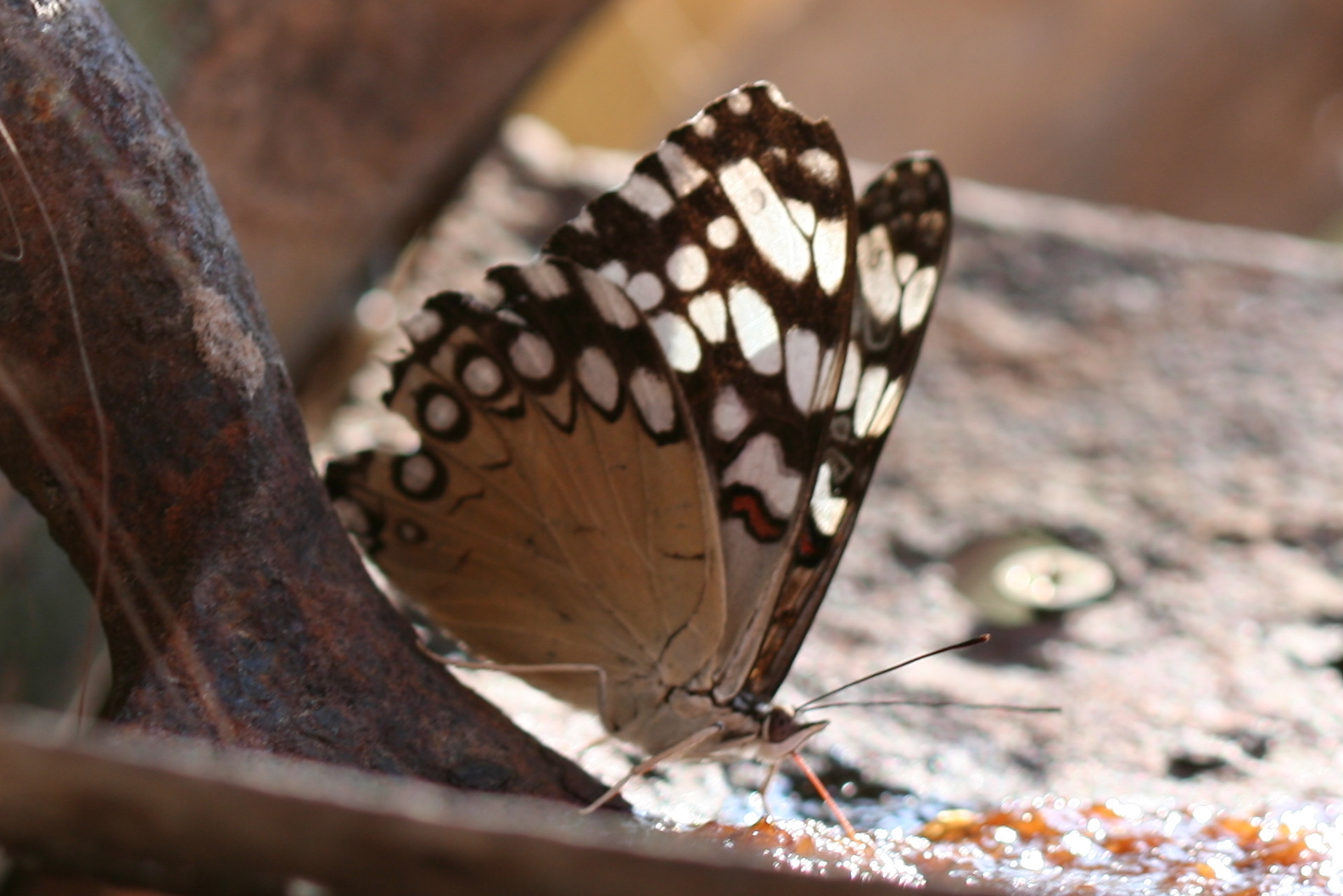

Scientific classification
- Kingdom: Animalia
- Phylum: Arthropoda
- Class: Insecta
- Order: Lepidoptera
- Family: Nymphalidae
- Genus: Hamadryas
- Species: H. guatemalena

Binomial name
- Hamadryas guatemalena Bates, 1864

= Hamadryas guatemalena =

Guatemalan cracker

Species of butterfly

Hamadryas guatemalena, also known as the Guatemalan cracker or Guatemalan calico, is a species of butterfly in the family Nymphalidae. It is found from southern North America to central South America.

The wingspan is 76–98 mm. The butterfly flies year round in the tropical parts of its range and in August in the temperate part of its range.

The larvae feed on Euphorbiaceae species. The adults feed on juices from rotting fruit and animal faeces.
