= Dalechampia triphylla =

Scientific classification
- Kingdom: Plantae
- Clade: Tracheophytes
- Clade: Angiosperms
- Clade: Eudicots
- Clade: Rosids
- Order: Malpighiales
- Family: Euphorbiaceae
- Genus: Dalechampia
- Species: D. triphylla

Binomial name
- Dalechampia triphylla Lam.

Species of flowering plant in the spurge family Euphorbiaceae

Dalechampia triphylla is a vine in the family Euphorbiaceae. It is native to tropical South America.

== Ecology ==
Dalechampia triphylla is the food plant of the larvae of several species of "cracker" butterflies. Hamadryas feronia and Hamadryas iphthime both feed on the leaves. These butterflies are shades of grey, brown and white, and are well camouflaged when they exhibit their characteristic behaviour and rest on tree trunks. The larvae of Hamadryas laodamia also feed on the leaves, but this butterfly is black with iridescent blue markings; the adult is avoided by predators such as jacamars, and the larvae appear to sequester distasteful toxic compounds present in the plant.
