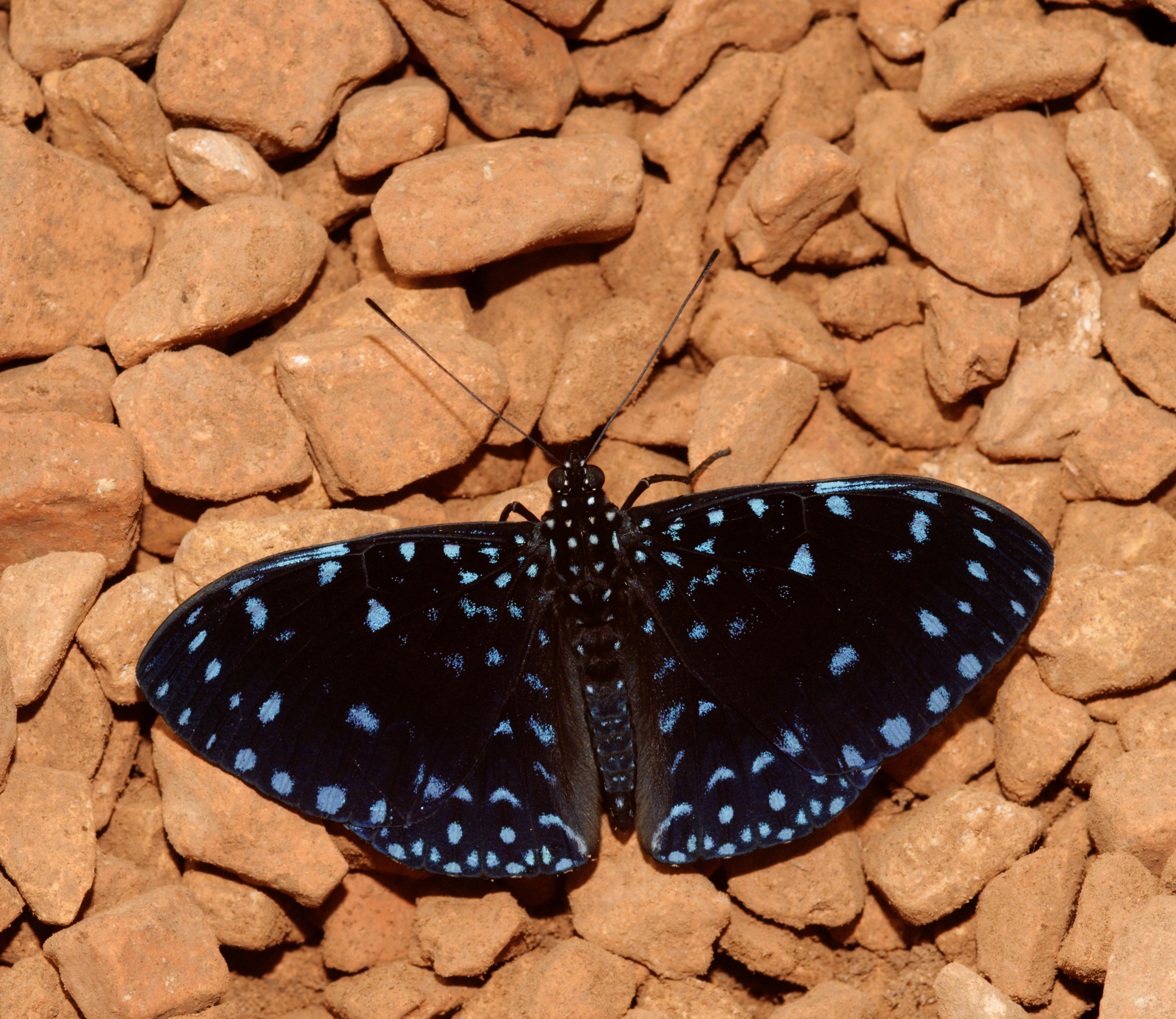

Scientific classification
- Kingdom: Animalia
- Phylum: Arthropoda
- Clade: Pancrustacea
- Class: Insecta
- Order: Lepidoptera
- Family: Nymphalidae
- Genus: Hamadryas
- Species: H. laodamia

Binomial name
- Hamadryas laodamia (Cramer, 1777)

Synonyms
- Papilio laodamia Cramer, 1777

= Hamadryas laodamia =

Starry night cracker

Species of butterfly

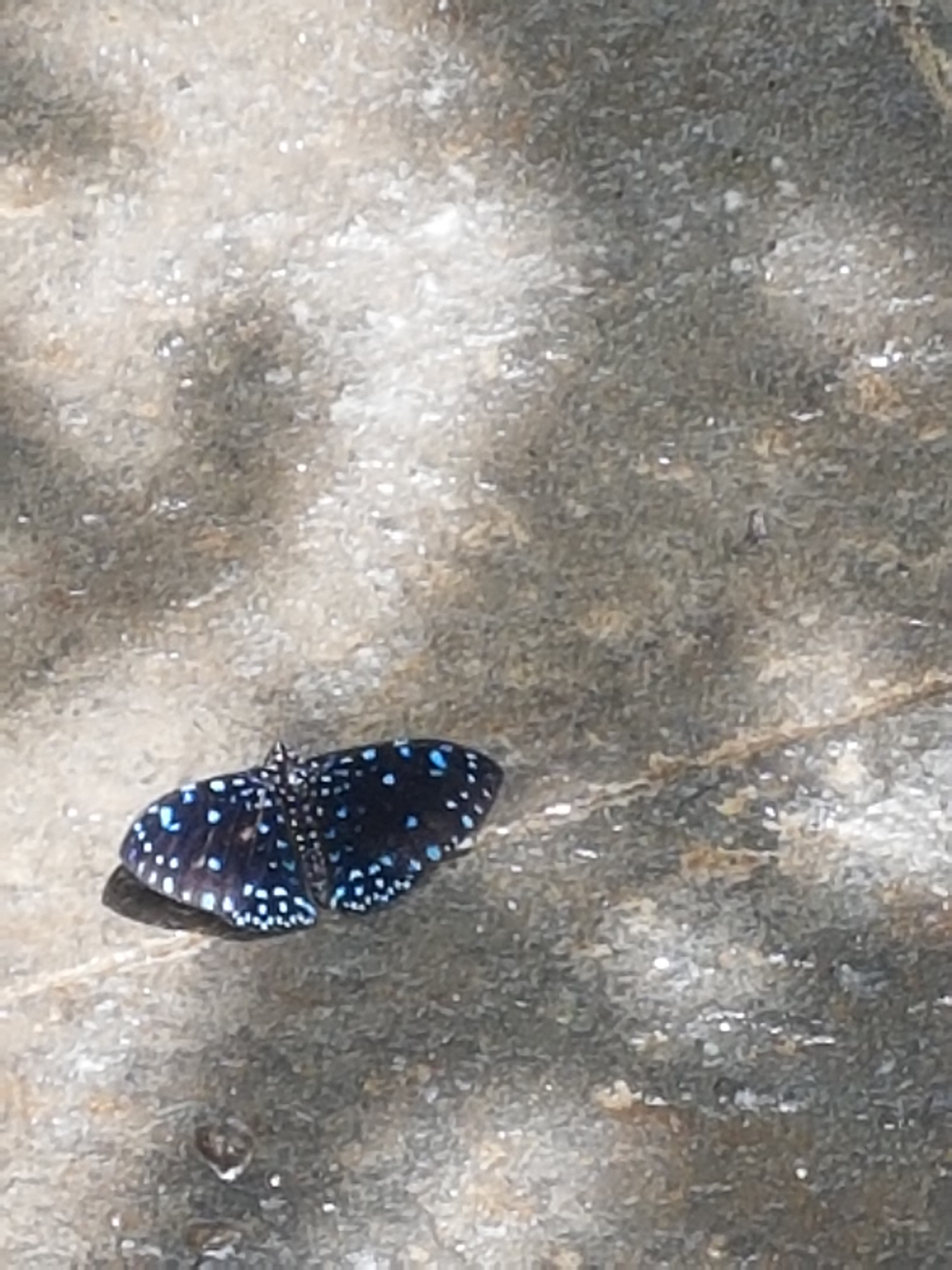
A captive specimen from the Park of the Reserve

Hamadryas laodamia, the starry night cracker or starry cracker, is a species of cracker butterfly in the family Nymphalidae. It can be found from Mexico to the Amazon basin, but is most common in lowland forest in the Caribbean area.

== Description ==
The starry night cracker is a black butterfly with iridescent blue speckling on its wings. The female has a white band on the underside of the forewing that is broader than the band on the male. The wingspan is about 7 cm (2.8 in). The caterpillars have short horns on their heads, the function of which is unknown, and the pupae are bright green.

== Distribution ==
This butterfly is native to the Caribbean area, Central America and tropical South America. It occurs at altitudes of up to 900 m (3,000 ft) on both the Pacific and Atlantic slopes of the Andes Ranges, but it is at its most common in lowland forests in the Caribbean region where it inhabits the mid and upper parts of the canopy.

== Ecology ==
The larvae of the starry night cracker feed on the leaves of Dalechampia triphylla, a vine in the family Euphorbiaceae. This butterfly exhibits aposematic colouring and is avoided by jacamars, birds that feed on other members of this family that rely on camouflage for their protection. It appears that the larvae of the starry night cracker store up distasteful toxic chemicals from the leaves, and the jacamars learn to avoid the vividly coloured adult butterflies.

The adult butterflies do not visit flowers, instead obtaining their nourishment by sucking the juices from rotting fruit. Like their well-camouflaged relatives, starry night crackers like to rest head-downward on the trunks of trees with their wings flattened against the bark.

== Subspecies ==
- Hamadryas laodamia laodamia (Mexico to Peru, Bolivia, Suriname and Brazil)
- H. laodamia saurites (Mexico to Colombia)
