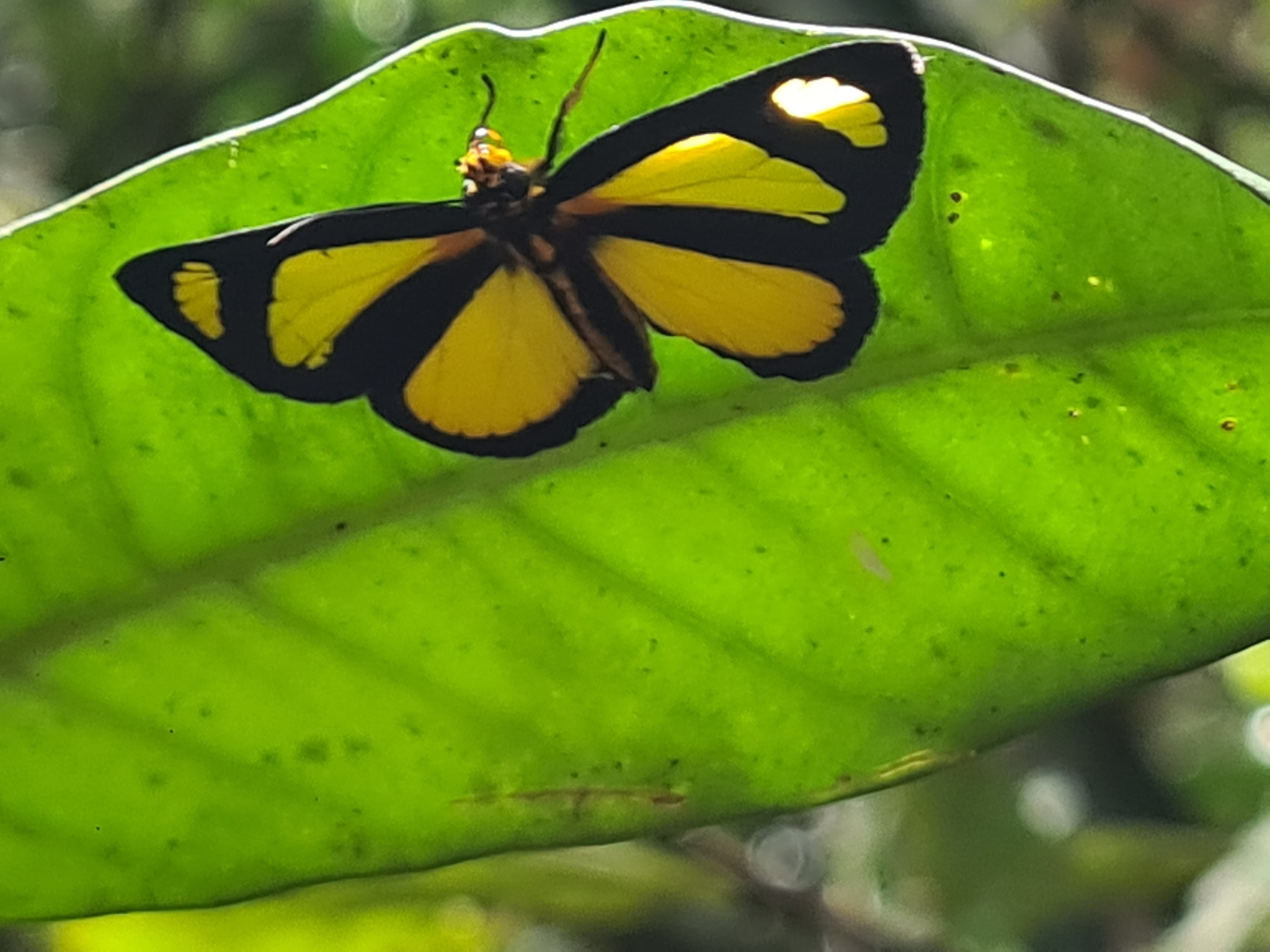

Scientific classification
- Kingdom: Animalia
- Phylum: Arthropoda
- Class: Insecta
- Order: Lepidoptera
- Family: Hesperiidae
- Genus: Cabirus
- Species: C. procas

Binomial name
- Cabirus procas (Cramer, 1777)
- Distribution Native range

= Cabirus procas =

Species of insect

Cabirus procas is a species of butterfly of the genus Cabirus.

== Description ==
Male specimens of C. procas is yellow and black, while female specimens look completely different, where white hyaline spots replace the yellow colour with brownish-black veins and folds.

== Distribution ==
Cabirus procas can be found in the Amazon basin, from The Guianas to Peru.
