= Cabirus =

Cabirus procas

Scientific classification
- Kingdom: Animalia
- Phylum: Arthropoda
- Class: Insecta
- Order: Lepidoptera
- Family: Hesperiidae
- Genus: Cabirus; Hübner, [1819]
- Species: C. procas

Binomial name
- Cabirus procas (Cramer, 1777)

Genus of butterflies

Cabirus is a genus of skippers in the family Hesperiidae. It is monotypic, being represented by the single species Cabirus procas.
