= List of butterflies of Colombia =

Location of Colombia

This is a list of butterflies of Colombia. About 1,600 species are known from Colombia.

== Hesperiidae ==
=== Hesperiinae ===
- Aethilla memmius
- Anthoptus epictetus
- Apaustus gracilis
- Apaustus menes
- Atalopedes campestris
- Callimormus alsimo
- Charidia lucaria
- Cymaenes odilia trebius
- Dubiella fiscella
- Ephyriades arcas
- Halotus angellus
- Hesperia notata
- Hesperia syrichtus
- Hylephila isonira
- Hylephila phyleus
- Lento lento
- Lerema accius
- Mnasitheus simplicissima
- Mnestheus ittona
- Niconiades merenda
- Orneates aegiochus
- Padraona imerius
- Panoquina sylvicola
- Papias integra
- Papias subcostulata
- Perichares philetes
- Perichares phocion
- Polites atenion
- Saliana esperi
- Saliana longirostris
- Saliana placens
- Serdis kirschi
- Sophista aristoteles
- Telegonus hahneli
- Thespieus pinda
- Thracides telegonus
- Thymelicus athenion
- Tigasis aphilos
- Typhedanus orion
- Vettius artona
- Vettius coryna
- Vettius lafrenaye
- Vettius marcus
- Vorates decorus
- Zenis janka

=== Heteropterinae ===
- Dalla frater
- Dalla superior

=== Pyrginae ===
- Achlyodes busirus
- Achlyodes pallida
- Anastrus obscurus
- Anastrus sempiternus
- Astraptes alardus aquila
- Astraptes fulgerator
- Astraptes talus
- Augiades crinisus
- Autochton aunus
- Autochton bipunctatus
- Autochton crinisus
- Autochton shema
- Autochton zarex
- Chioides catillus
- Chrysoplectrum perniciosus
- Cycloglypha thrasibulus
- Cyclosemia anastomosis
- Dyscophellus euribates
- Dyscophellus pharaxanor
- Entheus dius
- Entheus mathodius
- Entheus priassus
- Epargyreus spinta
- Eracon bufonia
- Gorgopas sneiderni
- Haemactis sanguinalis
- Helias phalaenoides
- Heliopetes alana
- Heliopetes arsalte
- Heliopetes leca
- Hyalothyrus infernalis
- Hyalothyrus neleus
- Mylon pulcherius
- Nisoniades ephora
- Noctuana haematospila
- Noctuana noctus
- Phanus vitreus
- Phareas coeleste
- Phocides pigmalion
- Phocides thernus
- Potamanaxas flavofasciata
- Proteides mercurius
- Pyrgus notata
- Pyrgus oileus
- Pyrgus syrichtus
- Pythonides amaryllis
- Pythonides supar
- Sostrata adamantinus
- Sostrata grippa
- Telemiades species
- Urbanus dorantes
- Urbanus eurycles
- Urbanus proteus
- Urbanus simplicius
- Urbanus teleus
- Xenophanes tryxus

=== Pyrrhopyginae ===
- Amenis pionia
- Elbella scylla
- Jemadia fallax
- Jemadia gnetus
- Jemadia hospita
- Mimoniades minthe
- Mimoniades nurscia malis
- Mimoniades pityusa
- Myscelus amystis
- Pyrrhopyge decipiens
- Pyrrhopyge phidias
- Pyrrhopyge schausi
- Pyrrhopyge selina
- Pyrrhogyra crameri nautica

== Lycaenidae ==
=== Polyommatinae ===
- Hemiargus hanno
- Leptotes andicola
- Leptotes casius

=== Theclinae ===
- Airamanna rhaptissima
- Antephrys marialis
- Antephrys santander
- Arawacus aetolius
- Arawacus leucogyna
- Arawacus togarna
- Arcas imperialis
- Arcas lecromi
- Arcas tuneta
- Argentostriatus calus
- Atlides atis
- Atlides didymaon
- Atlides polybe
- Caerofethra calchinia
- Calycopis beon
- Calystryma trebula
- Camissecla cleocha
- Celmia celmus
- Chalybs janias
- Chlorostrymon telea
- Cryptaenota mavors
- Cryptaenota rarous
- Cyanophrys distractus
- Cyanophrys pseudolongula
- Cyanophrys remuborealis
- Cycnus battus
- Cycnus phaleros
- Denivia hemon
- Denivia triquetra
- Egides aegides
- Evenus candidus
- Evenus nobilis
- Everes tulliola
- Janthecla leea
- Janthecla malvina
- Johnsonita johnsoni
- Lamprospilus decorata
- Lamprospilus nicetus
- Laothus phydela
- Leptopes striata
- Macusia satyroides
- Marachina maraches
- Megathecla cupentus
- Micandra circinata
- Micandra comae
- Micandra platyptera
- Ministrymon azia
- Mithras orobia
- Nesiostrymon endela
- Ocaria aholiba
- Olynthus ophelia
- Ostrinotes gentiana
- Panthiades aeolus pelion
- Panthiades bathildis
- Paralustrus commodus
- Paralustrus salazari
- Parrhasius selika
- Penaincisalia loxurina
- Plesiocyanophrys angela
- Plesiocyanophrys lamellalatus
- Plesiocyanophrys salazari
- Plesiocyanophrys silverado
- Pontirama andradei
- Pseudolycaena marsyas
- Radissima torresi
- Rekoa meton
- Rekoa palegon
- Rhamma arria
- Rhamma emeraldina
- Rhamma familiaris
- Strephonota strephon
- Strymon anthracaetus
- Strymon caldasensis
- Strymon gabatha
- Thecla alihoba
- Thecla ana
- Thecla cadmus
- Thecla episcopali
- Thecla giberosa
- Theclopsis eryx
- Thecloxurina atymnides
- Thecloxurina quindiensis
- Tigrinota ellida ellida
- Tigrinota jennifera
- Tmolus echion

== Nymphalidae ==
=== Acraeinae ===
- Actinote alcione
- Actinote anteas
- Actinote callianira
- Actinote callianthe
- Actinote desmiala
- Actinote dicaeus
- Actinote equatoria
- Actinote eresia
- Actinote flavibasis
- Actinote guatemalena
- Actinote hylonome
- Actinote iguaquensis
- Actinote melampeplos
- Actinote neleus
- Actinote ozomene
- Actinote parapheles
- Actinote pellenea adriana
- Actinote stratonice stratonice
- Actinote tenebrarum
- Actinote thalia

=== Apaturinae ===
- Doxocopa cherubina
- Doxocopa clothilda
- Doxocopa cyane
- Doxocopa elis
- Doxocopa felderi
- Doxocopa laurentia
- Doxocopa pavon

=== Biblidinae ===
- Adelpha alala completa
- Adelpha alala negra
- Adelpha attica carmela
- Adelpha bocotia bocotia
- Adelpha boreas
- Adelpha cocala
- Adelpha corcyra
- Adelpha cytherea
- Adelpha erotia
- Adelpha eytherea daguana
- Adelpha iphicla
- Adelpha iphiclus
- Adelpha irma
- Adelpha ixia
- Adelpha justina
- Adelpha lara fassli
- Adelpha lara hypsenor
- Adelpha lara mainas
- Adelpha lara trasiens
- Adelpha lerna
- Adelpha mesentina
- Adelpha olynthya levicula
- Adelpha olynthya olynthya
- Adelpha ophiclus iphicolea
- Adelpha paraena
- Adelpha philaca frausina
- Adelpha phylaca delphicola
- Adelpha plesaure phliassa
- Adelpha rothschildi
- Adelpha salmoneus
- Adelpha saundersii
- Adelpha serpa godmanii
- Adelpha sichaeus
- Adelpha ximena
- Adelpha zalmona eponia
- Adelpha zina
- Asterope buckleyi
- Asterope degandii
- Asterope optima
- Biblis hyperia
- Callicore aegina bella
- Callicore aegina stichelli
- Callicore cynosura
- Callicore dedina
- Callicore eunomia
- Callicore hystaspes
- Callicore ines
- Callicore pitheas
- Callicore platytaenia
- Callicore pygas
- Callicore tolima
- Catonephele acontius acontius
- Catonephele antinoe
- Catonephele chromis chromis
- Catonephele mexicana
- Catonephele numilia esite
- Catonephele numilia numilia
- Catonephele oriste
- Catonephele salacia
- Catonephele salambria
- Diaethria anna
- Diaethria artenis
- Diaethria clymena
- Diaethria dodone
- Diaethria eluina
- Diaethria euclides
- Diaethria marchalii
- Diaethria neglecta
- Diaethria pholgea
- Diaethria seraphina
- Dynamine anubis
- Dynamine artemisia
- Dynamine chryseis
- Dynamine erchia
- Dynamine gisella
- Dynamine glauce
- Dynamine myrson
- Dynamine onias
- Dynamine persis
- Dynamine racidula
- Dynamine sara
- Dynamine theseus
- Ectima lirides
- Ectima rectifascia
- Ectima thecla astricta
- Epiphile boliviana
- Epiphile chrysites
- Epiphile dinoma
- Epiphile dinora
- Epiphile epimenes
- Epiphile episcate
- Epiphile eriopis
- Epiphile orea iblis
- Eunica alcmena flora
- Eunica alpais alpais
- Eunica anna
- Eunica bechina bechina
- Eunica caelina alycia
- Eunica carias cabira
- Eunica clytia
- Eunica concordia
- Eunica eurota
- Eunica malvina malvina
- Eunica marsolia fasula
- Eunica mygdonia mygdonia
- Eunica norica norica
- Eunica pomona
- Eunica veronica
- Eunica viola
- Eunica volumna celma
- Hamadryas alicia
- Hamadryas amphinome
- Hamadryas arinome
- Hamadryas chloe
- Hamadryas clytemnestra
- Hamadryas dione
- Hamadryas februa
- Hamadryas feronia
- Hamadryas laodamia
- Marpesia alcibiades
- Marpesia berania
- Marpesia catulus
- Marpesia chirop
- Marpesia coresia
- Marpesia corina
- Marpesia crethon
- Marpesia egina
- Marpesia hermione
- Marpesia iole
- Marpesia livius
- Marpesia marcella
- Marpesia merops
- Marpesia norica
- Marpesia orsilochus
- Marpesia petreus
- Mestra semifulua
- Myscelia capenas octomaculata
- Nessaea aglaura
- Nessaea hewitsoni
- Nessaea regina
- Nica flavilla
- Panacea divalis
- Panacea procilla
- Panacea prola
- Panacea regina
- Paulogramma peristera
- Peria lamis
- Perisama aequatorialis
- Perisama alicia ilia
- Perisama auriclea
- Perisama bomplandii
- Perisama cardense
- Perisama cloelia
- Perisama diotina
- Perisama dorbignyi
- Perisama harzama
- Perisama humboltii
- Perisama lebasii
- Perisama mariana
- Perisama oppelii
- Perisama patara
- Perisama tryphena
- Perisama voninka
- Pyrrhogyra edocla
- Pyrrhogyra nasica
- Pyrrhogyra neaerea
- Pyrrhogyra otolais
- Smyrna blomfildia
- Temenis laothoe laothoe
- Temenis laothoe ottonis
- Temenis laothoe violetta
- Temenis pulchra

=== Brassolinae ===
- Brassolis granadensis
- Brassolis isthmia
- Brassolis sophorae
- Caligo atreus agesilaus
- Caligo atreus atreus
- Caligo brasiliensis
- Caligo eurilochus
- Caligo idomeneus
- Caligo illioneus illioneus
- Caligo illioneus oberon
- Caligo memnon
- Caligo oberthurii
- Caligo oedipus
- Caligo oileus scamander
- Caligo philimos
- Caligo placidianus
- Caligo prometheus
- Caligo zeuxippus obsecurus
- Catoblepia berecynthia
- Catoblepia generosa
- Catolepsis soranus
- Dynastor macrosiris strix
- Eryphanis lycomedon automedon
- Eryphanis polyxena
- Opsiphanes bogotanus bogotanus
- Opsiphanes cassiae
- Opsiphanes cassina chiriquensis
- Opsiphanes invirae
- Opsiphanes invirae cuspidatus
- Opsiphanes invirae stieheli
- Opsiphanes quiteria augerias
- Opsiphanes quiteria quirinus
- Opsiphanes tamarindi corrosus
- Selenophanes josephus

=== Charaxinae ===
- Agrias aedon
- Agrias amydon amaryllis
- Agrias beatifica pherenice
- Agrias beatifica staudingeri
- Agrias claudina
- Agrias eurimedia eurimedia
- Agrias sardanapalus intermedia
- Anaea aidae
- Archaeoprepona demophon demophon
- Archaeoprepona demophoon gulina
- Archaeoprepona licomedes
- Archaeoprepona phaedra
- Consul fabius cecrops
- Consul fabius fabius
- Consul fabius ochraceus
- Consul fabius semifulvus
- Consul fabius titheroides
- Consul panariste
- Fountainea eurypyle
- Fountainea glycerium comstoki
- Fountainea glycerium glycerium
- Fountainea nesea
- Fountainea nessus
- Fountainea ryphea ryphea
- Fountainea titan
- Hypna clytemnestra clytemnestra
- Memphis anna
- Memphis arachne
- Memphis austrina
- Memphis glauce
- Memphis glaucone
- Memphis laura rosae
- Memphis lineata
- Memphis lyceus
- Memphis lynneeus
- Memphis oenomais
- Memphis pasibula
- Memphis polycarmes
- Memphis proserpina
- Memphis pseudiphis
- Memphis xenocles
- Noreppa chromus
- Polygrapha xenocrates xenocrates
- Prepona laertes
- Prepona praeneste
- Siderone mars
- Siderone marthesia
- Zaretis itys
- Zaretis syene

=== Danainae ===
- Danaus berenice hermippus
- Danaus eresimus
- Danaus gilippus
- Danaus plexippus megalippe
- Ituna ilione
- Lycorea cledobaea atergatis
- Lycorea halia
- Lycorea pasinuntia

=== Heliconiinae ===
- Agraulis vanillae lucina
- Dione glycera
- Dione juno
- Dione moneta butleri
- Dione moneta moneta
- Dryadula phaetusa
- Dryas iulia
- Eueides aliphera
- Eueides edias
- Eueides eolias
- Eueides isabella arquata
- Eueides lybia olympia
- Eueides procula edias
- Eueides seitzi
- Eueides tales calathus
- Eueides vibilia unifasciatus
- Heliconius antiochus
- Heliconius aoede bartletti
- Heliconius charitonius
- Heliconius clysonimus
- Heliconius clytia
- Heliconius congerge aquilionaris
- Heliconius cydno zelinde
- Heliconius doris
- Heliconius earondona
- Heliconius eleisatus
- Heliconius erato dignus
- Heliconius erato lativitta
- Heliconius erato venus
- Heliconius eucomus metallis
- Heliconius euphone
- Heliconius hecale marius
- Heliconius hecale melicerta
- Heliconius hecale quitalena
- Heliconius hecuba flava
- Heliconius hierax
- Heliconius ismenius abadae
- Heliconius lenaeus
- Heliconius leucadia
- Heliconius melponeme aglaope
- Heliconius melponeme bellula
- Heliconius melponeme vulcanus
- Heliconius numata aristona
- Heliconius numata euphone
- Heliconius numata euphrasius
- Heliconius numata idalion
- Heliconius numata mesene
- Heliconius numata numata
- Heliconius sapho chocoensis
- Heliconius sara apseudes
- Heliconius sara sara
- Heliconius sara sprucei
- Heliconius sara thamar
- Heliconius vicinia
- Heliconius wallacei
- Heliconius xanthocles explicata
- Heliconius xanthocles melete
- Philaethria dido
- Philaethria pygmalion
- Podotricha eucroia
- Podotricha telesiphe tithraustes

=== Ithomiinae ===
- Aeria eurimedia agna
- Aeria eurimedia eurimedia
- Cerasticada doto
- Ceratinia cayana
- Ceratinia fraterna
- Ceratinia iolaia iolaia
- Ceratinia nise nise
- Ceratinia tulia dorilla
- Ceratinia tutia poecila
- Ceratinia tutia poecilla
- Dircenna adina marica
- Dircenna dero
- Dircenna euchytma
- Dircenna jemina
- Dircenna klugii
- Dircenna loreta
- Dircenna methonella
- Dircenna olyras relata
- Dircenna xanthophane
- Elzunia humboldt humboldt
- Elzunia pavonii
- Episcada mira
- Episcada sidonia
- Eutresis hypereia imitatrix
- Forbestra equicola equicoloides
- Godyris dircenna
- Godyris duillia albinotata
- Godyris hewitsoni
- Godyris neops neops
- Godyris panthyale phantyale
- Godyris panthyale quinta
- Godyris panthylea
- Godyris zavaleta amaretta
- Godyris zavaleta caesioptica
- Godyris zavaleta gonussa
- Greta alphesiboea
- Greta andromica dromica
- Greta libethris
- Heterosais giulia nephele
- Hyalyris coeno florida
- Hyalyris coeno norella
- Hyalyris excelsa excelsa
- Hyalyris oulitia oulitia
- Hymenitis nero
- Hypoleria adelphina
- Hypoleria aurcliana
- Hypoleria chrysodonia
- Hypoleria famina
- Hypoleria karschi
- Hypoleria ocaela
- Hypoleria orolina
- Hypomenitis theudelinda
- Hyposcada anchiala anchiala
- Hyposcada illinissa dinilia
- Hypothyris anastasia honesta
- Hypothyris euclea intermedia
- Hypothyris euclea valora
- Hypothyris lycaste dionaea
- Hypothyris lycaste fraterna
- Hypothyris ninonia antonia
- Hypothyris ninonia dhipes
- Hypothyris ninonica opollini
- Hypothyris semifulva putumayensis
- Ithomia agnosia amarila
- Ithomia avella avella
- Ithomia derasa
- Ithomia diasia diasia
- Ithomia dryma
- Ithomia hyala hyala
- Ithomia iphianassa alienassa
- Ithomia terra terra
- Ithomia travella
- Mechanitis doryssus veritabilis
- Mechanitis egaensis
- Mechanitis istmia doryssides
- Mechanitis lysimnia elisa
- Mechanitis mazaeus eggensis
- Mechanitis mazaeus macrinus
- Mechanitis mazeaeus mazeaeus
- Mechanitis mazeaeus messenoides
- Mechanitis menapis menapis
- Mechanitis mesenoides deceptus
- Mechanitis panmitera
- Mechanitis polymmia caucaensis
- Mechanitis polymnia werneri
- Melinaea ethra maeonis
- Melinaea lilis doona
- Melinaea ludovica
- Melinaea maelus cydon
- Melinaea marsaeus macaria
- Melinaea marsaeus messenina
- Melinaea marsaeus mothoe
- Melinaea menophilus ernestor
- Melinaea menophilus simulatur
- Melinaea mnasias lucifer
- Melinaea mneme
- Methona confusa
- Methona esafusa
- Napeogenes achaea nicolayi
- Napeogenes apulia
- Napeogenes inachia pharo
- Napeogenes perantes azeka
- Napeogenes stella
- Napeogenes sylphis corena
- Napeogenes verticilla
- Oleria agarista
- Oleria amalda
- Oleria astraea
- Oleria athalina banjana
- Oleria athalina tremona
- Oleria caucana
- Oleria estella
- Oleria kena
- Oleria lerdina
- Oleria lota
- Oleria luliberda
- Oleria makrena makrena
- Oleria makrena makrenita
- Oleria phenomoe
- Oleria quadrata
- Oleria sexmaculata
- Oleria tigilla
- Oleria zelica
- Ollantaya oneida
- Ollantaya thabena
- Ollantaya zabina
- Olyras praestan
- Pagyris cymothoe sylvella
- Patricia dercyllidas
- Pteronymia aletta agalla
- Pteronymia antisae
- Pteronymia artena
- Pteronymia latilla
- Pteronymia laura
- Pteronymia notilla
- Pteronymia obscurata
- Pteronymia sparsa
- Pteronymia vestilla vestilla
- Pteronymia zerlina
- Sais paraensis
- Sais rosalia mosella
- Sais rosalia promissa
- Sais rosalia rosalinda
- Scada batesi
- Scada ethica
- Scada quotidiana
- Scada theaphia batesi
- Scada zibia xanthina
- Thyridia psidii
- Tithorea harmonia
- Tithorea pinthias
- Tithorea tarricina hecalesia

=== Libytheinae ===
- Cartea vitula
- Diophthalma lagora lepida
- Diophthalma philemon philemon
- Echenais adelina
- Echenais thelephus
- Emesis lucinda
- Helicopis cupido
- Imelda glaucosmia
- Ithomiola cascella
- Ithomiola floralis
- Lucilla camissa
- Lybytheana carinenta
- Lymnas cratia
- Lymnas iarbas
- Nahida coenoides
- Napaea eucharilla merula
- Napaea nepos tanos
- Napaea theages
- Napaea veruta
- Semomesia unduosa
- Teratophthalma nigrita
- Teratophthalma phelina
- Voltinia theata
- Xinias cynosema hyalodis

=== Limenitidinae ===
- Baeotus amazonicus
- Baeotus baeotus
- Baeotus deucalion
- Colobura dirce
- Historis acheronta
- Historis odius orion
- Pycina zamba
- Tigridia acesta

=== Melitaeinae ===
- Gnathotriche exclamationis
- Phyciodes perilla
- Phyciodes ptolyca
- Phyciodes virilis

=== Morphinae ===
- Antirrhea avernus
- Antirrhea eaquenius
- Antirrhea isabelae
- Antirrhea miltiades
- Antirrhea taygetina
- Antirrhea watkinsi
- Morpho achilles
- Morpho adonis
- Morpho amathonte
- Morpho cisseis
- Morpho cypris lelargei
- Morpho eugenia
- Morpho granadiensis
- Morpho hecuba hecuba
- Morpho hecuba polyxena
- Morpho hecuba werneri
- Morpho helenor helenor
- Morpho hermione
- Morpho leontius leontius
- Morpho menelaus melacheidus
- Morpho menelaus menelaus
- Morpho menenaus nigra
- Morpho micropthalmus
- Morpho neoptolemus
- Morpho patroclus
- Morpho peleides peleides
- Morpho retenor
- Morpho rodopteron
- Morpho rugita eniata
- Morpho staudinger
- Morpho sulkowski
- Morpho telemachus
- Morpho theseus cretacea
- Morpho theseus theseus

=== Nymphalinae ===
- Anartia amathea
- Anartia jatrophae
- Anthanassa drusilla
- Batesia hypochlora
- Castilia angusta
- Castilia castilla
- Castilia ofella
- Castilia perilla
- Chlosyne lacinia
- Chlosyne narva
- Chlosyne nivea
- Cybdeles mnasylus
- Eresia alsina
- Eresia anomla
- Eresia clara
- Eresia etesiae
- Eresia eunice
- Eresia eutropia
- Eresia ithomioides
- Eresia letitia
- Eresia levina
- Eresia margaretha
- Eresia mechanithis
- Eresia moesta fassli
- Eresia moesta moesta
- Eresia oblita
- Eresia pelonia
- Eresia phaedima
- Eresia polina
- Eresia selene
- Euptoieta hegesia
- Hypanartia godmanii
- Hypanartia kefersteini
- Hypanartia lethe
- Hypanartia linfigii
- Janatella leucodesma
- Junonia evarete
- Junonia genoveva
- Junonia lavinia
- Junonia vestina
- Ortilia gentione
- Siproeta elissa
- Siproeta epaphus
- Siproeta stelenes
- Siproeta sulpitia
- Tegosa anieta luka
- Tegosa similis
- Telenassa trimaculata
- Thessalia theona
- Vanessa braziliensis
- Vanessa cardui
- Vanessa carye
- Vanessa virginiensis

=== Satyrinae ===
- Bia actorion actorion
- Caeruleuptychia aegrota
- Catargynnis pholoe
- Cepheuptychia cephus
- Chloreuptychia agatha
- Chloreuptychia arnaea
- Chloreuptychia chloris
- Chloreuptychia languida
- Cissia albofasciata
- Cissia alsione
- Cissia benedicta
- Cissia cucullina
- Cissia enyo
- Cissia moepius
- Cissia myncea
- Cissia penelope
- Cissia renata
- Cissia ucumariensis
- Cissia vesta
- Cithaerias aurora
- Cithaerias aurorina
- Cithaerias erba browni
- Cithaerias menander
- Cithaerias mimica
- Cithaerias pyritosa
- Corades chelonis
- Corades cistene generosa
- Corades enyo almo
- Corades medeba
- Corades medeba columbina
- Corades orcus
- Corades pannonia ploas
- Daedalma dinias dinias
- Dioriste leucospilos
- Dulcedo polita
- Eretris apuleja
- Eretris calisto oculata
- Eretris sucannae
- Euptychia aegrota
- Euptychia agatha
- Euptychia antonoe
- Euptychia calixta
- Euptychia cephus
- Euptychia clhoris
- Euptychia erichto
- Euptychia eusebia
- Euptychia gulnare
- Euptychia halle
- Euptychia herse
- Euptychia hesione
- Euptychia hesionides
- Euptychia inornata
- Euptychia marica
- Euptychia metaleuca
- Euptychia nortia
- Euptychia nossis
- Euptychia pagyris
- Euptychia suboscura
- Euptychia terrestris
- Euptychia tolumnia
- Euptychia vesta
- Euptychia westwoodii
- Haetera hypaesia
- Haetera piera ecuadora
- Haetera piera piera
- Harjesia obscura
- Hermeuptychia erigone
- Hermeuptychia hermes
- Junea dorinda
- Lasiophila behemonth
- Lasiophila circe
- Lasiophila orbifera
- Lasiophila prostymna
- Lasiophila zapatosa
- Lymanopoda albocincta
- Lymanopoda attis
- Lymanopoda labineta
- Lymanopoda lactea
- Lymanopoda lebbaea
- Lymanopoda nevada
- Lymanopoda obsoleta
- Lymanopoda panacea panacea
- Lymanopoda panacea venusia
- Lymanopoda samius
- Magneuptychia lybie
- Magneuptychia mimas
- Magneuptychia mycalesis
- Magneuptychia ocnus
- Manataria hercyna hyrnethia
- Manataria maculata
- Mygona chocoana
- Mygona irmina
- Mygona orcedice
- Mygona propylea
- Oressinoma thepla
- Oressinoma typhla
- Oxeochistus pronax
- Oxeochistus simplex
- Oxeoschistus protogenia
- Panyapedaliodes silpa
- Parataygetis beata
- Pareuptychia occirrhoe
- Pedaliodes cesarense
- Pedaliodes cocytia
- Pedaliodes drymaea
- Pedaliodes empusa
- Pedaliodes flavopunctata
- Pedaliodes hewitsoni
- Pedaliodes jephtha
- Pedaliodes juba juba
- Pedaliodes juba triquetra
- Pedaliodes muscosa
- Pedaliodes naevia
- Pedaliodes nebris
- Pedaliodes niphoessia
- Pedaliodes parranda
- Pedaliodes patizathes
- Pedaliodes peceustes
- Pedaliodes pelinaea
- Pedaliodes peucestas
- Pedaliodes phaedra
- Pedaliodes pheres
- Pedaliodes phoenissa
- Pedaliodes phraciclea
- Pedaliodes phrasicla
- Pedaliodes plotina
- Pedaliodes poesia
- Pedaliodes polla
- Pedaliodes pollonia
- Pedaliodes polusca
- Pedaliodes proerna
- Pedaliodes socorrae
- Pedaloides trimaea
- Penrosada leaena
- Pierella amalia
- Pierella astyoche astyoche
- Pierella astyoche lucia
- Pierella helvina helvina
- Pierella helvina ocreata
- Pierella hortona
- Pierella hyalinus dracontis
- Pierella hyceta
- Pierella lamia chalybaea
- Pierella lamia columbiana
- Pierella lena brasiliensis
- Pierella lena glaucolena
- Pierella lena obscura
- Pierella lesbia
- Pierella luna luna
- Pierella ocreata
- Posttaygetis penelea
- Praepronophila perperna
- Pronophila brennus
- Pronophila juliani
- Pronophila orchewitsoni
- Pronophila orcus
- Pseudohaetera piera
- Pseudohaeterea hypaesia
- Pseudohaeterea macleannania
- Pseudomaniola loxo
- Pseudomaniola pholoe
- Steremnia pronophila
- Steremnia selva
- Steroma andensis
- Steroma bega
- Steroma superba
- Taygetis andromeda crameri
- Taygetis celia kenaza
- Taygetis chrisogone
- Taygetis laches
- Taygetis larua
- Taygetis marpessa
- Taygetis mermeria
- Taygetis salvini
- Taygetis sylvia
- Taygetis virgilia
- Taygetis xenana xenama
- Vila emilia

== Papilionidae ==
=== Papilioninae ===
- Battus belus belus
- Battus belus varus
- Battus chalceus ingenuus
- Battus crassus lepidus
- Battus laodamas
- Battus lycidas
- Battus polydamas polydamas
- Eurytides dolicaon deileon
- Eurytides orabilis
- Eurytides serville columbus
- Eurytides serville serville
- Heraclides anchisiades anchisiades
- Heraclides anchisiades idaeus
- Heraclides androgeus epidaurus
- Heraclides astyalus
- Heraclides chiansiades
- Heraclides cresphontes
- Heraclides homothoas
- Heraclides isidorus flavescens
- Heraclides isidorus pacificus
- Heraclides paeon thrason
- Heraclides rhodostictus
- Heraclides thoas cinyras
- Heraclides thoas nealces
- Heraclides thoas thoas
- Heraclides torquatus jeani
- Mimoides ariarathes gayi
- Mimoides ariarathes
- Mimoides euryleon anatmus
- Mimoides euryleon euryleon
- Mimoides euryleon pithonius
- Mimoides ilus ilus
- Mimoides pausanias cleombrotas
- Mimoides pausanias hermolaus
- Mimoides pausanias pausanias
- Mimoides phaon
- Mimoides xeniades halex
- Mimoides xynias trapeza
- Papilio polyxenes americacus
- Papilio polyxenes americus
- Parides aeneas bolivar
- Parides anchises drucei
- Parides anchises separis
- Parides chabrias chabrias
- Parides childrenae childrenae
- Parides childrenae latisfasciata
- Parides childrenae unimacula
- Parides cutorina
- Parides erithalion cauca
- Parides erithalion erithalion
- Parides erithalion keithi
- Parides erithalion kruegeri
- Parides erithalion smalli
- Parides erithalion zeuxis
- Parides erythrus
- Parides eurimedes agathokles
- Parides eurimedes antheas
- Parides eurimedes arriphus
- Parides eurimedes eurimedes
- Parides iphidamas gorgonae
- Parides lysander brissonius
- Parides neophilus neophilus
- Parides neophilus olivencius
- Parides panares erythrus
- Parides panares lycimenes
- Parides panares tachira
- Parides phosphorus gratianus
- Parides pizarro
- Parides sesostris sesostris
- Parides sesostris tarquinius
- Parides vertumnus bogotanus
- Protesilaus glaucolaus hetaerius
- Protesilaus glaucolaus melaenus
- Protesilaus molops hetaerius
- Protesilaus protesilaus archesilaus
- Protesilaus telesilaus telesilaus
- Protographium agesilaus autosilaus
- Protographium agesilaus eimeri
- Protographium dioxippus diores
- Protographium leucaspis
- Protographium thyastes marchandii
- Protographium thyastes thyastinus
- Pterouros cacicus nesrinae
- Pterouros cephalus
- Pterourus cacicus
- Pterourus euterpinus ebruneus
- Pterourus menatius eurotas
- Pterourus zagreus bachus

== Pieridae ==
=== Coliadinae ===
- Anteos clorinde
- Anteos menippe
- Aphrissa boisduvalii
- Aphrissa statira etiolata
- Aphrissa statira statira
- Colias dimera
- Colias lesbia andina
- Eurema agave
- Eurema albula
- Eurema daira
- Eurema elathea vitelina
- Eurema equatora
- Eurema gratiosa
- Eurema limbia
- Eurema lisa
- Eurema mexicana
- Eurema mycale
- Eurema reticulata
- Eurema salome
- Eurema venusta limbia
- Eurema xantochlora
- Kricogonia lyside
- Leucidia brephos
- Nathalis iole
- Phoebis agarithe
- Phoebis argante
- Phoebis eubule
- Phoebis philea philea
- Phoebis rurina
- Phoebis sennae
- Pyrisitia nise
- Pyrisitia proterpia
- Rhabdodryas trite
- Zerene phillippa

=== Dismorphinae ===
- Dismorphia altis
- Dismorphia amphione amphione
- Dismorphia amphione argione
- Dismorphia amphione broomiae
- Dismorphia arcadia medorina
- Dismorphia avonia
- Dismorphia crisia crisia
- Dismorphia crisia foedora
- Dismorphia hyposticta manuelita
- Dismorphia ines
- Dismorphia ithomia
- Dismorphia lelex
- Dismorphia lewyi leonora
- Dismorphia lycosura
- Dismorphia lysis
- Dismorphia medora
- Dismorphia mercenaris
- Dismorphia methymna
- Dismorphia mirandola
- Dismorphia thermesia
- Dismorphia theucharilla avonia
- Dismorphia theucharilla xanthone
- Dismorphia zaela
- Dismorphia zathoe core
- Dismorphia zathoe zathoe
- Enantia licina
- Lieinix nemesis
- Moschoneura pinthaeus
- Patia orise
- Pseudopieris nehemia aequatorialis

=== Pierinae ===
- Archonias tereas approximata
- Archonias tereas archidona
- Ascia buniae
- Ascia monuste orseis
- Ascia sevata
- Ascia sincera
- Catasticta actinotis
- Catasticta albofasciata
- Catasticta anaitis
- Catasticta apaturina
- Catasticta bithyna
- Catasticta crysolopha
- Catasticta flisa dilutior
- Catasticta frontina
- Catasticta hebra
- Catasticta incertina
- Catasticta licorgus lanceolata
- Catasticta loja
- Catasticta maneo
- Catasticta notha caucana
- Catasticta pastaza
- Catasticta philodora
- Catasticta philonarche
- Catasticta philone
- Catasticta philothea
- Catasticta prioneris
- Catasticta puactata
- Catasticta reducta
- Catasticta seitzi
- Catasticta sisamnus sisamnus
- Catasticta sisamnus telasco
- Catasticta socorrensis
- Catasticta teumatis
- Catasticta tomyris tomyris
- Catasticta uricoecheae
- Catasticta watkinsi
- Catasticta zana
- Hesperocharis hirlanda
- Hesperocharis marchalii
- Hesperocharis nera nymphaea
- Itaballia demophile demophile
- Itaballia pandosia sabata
- Itaballia pisonca
- Itaballia pisonis
- Leodonta chiriquensis
- Leodonta tellane
- Leodonta zenobina
- Leptophobia aripa
- Leptophobia caesia semicaesia
- Leptophobia caesia tenvicornis
- Leptophobia eleone
- Leptophobia eleusis
- Leptophobia euthemia
- Leptophobia monuste
- Leptophobia olympia
- Leptophobia penthica
- Leptophobia philona
- Leptophobia smithii
- Leptophobia tovaria
- Melete florinda daguana
- Melete lycimnia aelia
- Melete lycimnia lycimnia
- Melete peruviana
- Melete polyhymnia
- Pereute callinice numbalensis
- Pereute charops charops
- Pereute charops columbia
- Pereute charops subvarians
- Pereute leucodrosime
- Perrhybris lorena lorena
- Perrhybris lypora
- Perrhybris pyrrha
- Pieriballia mandela mandela
- Pieriballia mandelena locusta
- Tatochila sterodice arctodice
- Tatochila xanthodice xanthodice

== Riodinidae ==
=== Euselasiinae ===
- Euselasia angulata
- Euselasia argentea
- Euselasia ater
- Euselasia aurantia
- Euselasia cafusa
- Euselasia candaria
- Euselasia clithra
- Euselasia corduena
- Euselasia cyanira
- Euselasia euboea
- Euselasia eugeon
- Euselasia euliona
- Euselasia eumedia
- Euselasia eumenes
- Euselasia eupatra
- Euselasia euriteas
- Euselasia eusepus
- Euselasia hahneli
- Euselasia leucorrhoea
- Euselasia licinia
- Euselasia melaphaea
- Euselasia mys crinina
- Euselasia orfita eutychus
- Euselasia phedica
- Euselasia teleclus
- Hades hecamede hecate
- Hades noctula
- Methone cecilia chrysomela

=== Riodininae ===
- Adelotypa allector mollis
- Adelotypa aristus
- Adelotypa penthea
- Alesa amesis
- Alesa prema
- Amarynthis meneria micalia
- Ancyluris eryxo
- Ancyluris eudaemon
- Ancyluris formosa
- Ancyluris meliboeus
- Ancyluris mira
- Ancyluris miranda
- Anteros acheus
- Anteros allectus
- Anteros bracteata
- Anteros chrysoprastus
- Anteros formosus
- Anteros renaldus
- Argyrogrammana barine
- Argyrogrammana macularia
- Argyrogrammana saphirina
- Argyrogrammana stilbe
- Baeotis felix felicissima
- Baeotis nesaea
- Brachyglenis esthema
- Calospila argenissa
- Calospila emylius
- Calospila judias
- Calospila labobatas
- Calospila porthaon
- Calydna volcanicus
- Caria lampeto
- Caria mantinea
- Caria trochilus arete
- Cariomothis erythromelas
- Chalodeta theodora
- Charis cleonus
- Charis hermodora
- Chorinea octauius
- Cremna actoris
- Crocozona coecias
- Emesis angularis
- Emesis brimo
- Emesis cypria
- Emesis cypria phapias
- Emesis eurydice
- Emesis fatima
- Emesis heterochroa
- Emesis lucinda aurimma
- Emesis lucinda euridice
- Emesis lucinda opaca
- Emesis mandana aurelia
- Emesis ocypore
- Eunogyra satyrus curupira
- Eurybia cyclopia
- Eurybia dardus unxia
- Eurybia donna
- Eurybia halimede
- Eurybia lamia
- Eurybia leucolopha
- Eurybia lycisca
- Eurybia nicaeus erythinosa
- Eurybia persona granulata
- Hermathena candidata columba
- Hyphilaria anophtalma
- Hyphilaria anthias
- Hyphilaria nicias
- Hyphilaria parthenis virgatula
- Ithomeis corena
- Ithomeis mimica
- Juditha molpe
- Lasaia agesilas
- Lasaia moeros
- Lemonias emylius
- Leucochimona aequatorialis
- Leucochimona lagora
- Leucochimona matatha
- Leucochimona matisca
- Leucochimona philemon
- Melanis bodia
- Melanis passiena
- Melanis pixie
- Menander hebrus
- Menander menander
- Mesene capissene
- Mesene hay
- Mesene monostigma
- Mesene phareus rubella
- Mesene semiradiata
- Mesophthalma idotea
- Mesosemia ahava
- Mesosemia asa
- Mesosemia cardeni
- Mesosemia ceropia
- Mesosemia cippus
- Mesosemia coelestis
- Mesosemia ephyne
- Mesosemia eumene
- Mesosemia gertraudis
- Mesosemia ibycus
- Mesosemia judicialis
- Mesosemia junta
- Mesosemia loruhama
- Mesosemia macaris
- Mesosemia machaera
- Mesosemia maela
- Mesosemia maenades
- Mesosemia melpia
- Mesosemia menoetes
- Mesosemia methuana
- Mesosemia metura
- Mesosemia mevania pacifica
- Mesosemia nina
- Mesosemia odice
- Mesosemia orbona
- Mesosemia rhodia
- Mesosemia sibiyina
- Mesosemia sifia
- Mesosemia sylvia
- Mesosemia telegone amiana
- Mesosemia tenebrosa
- Mesosemia ulrica
- Mesosemia zanoa orthia
- Mesosemia zonalis
- Mesosemia zorea
- Metacharis lucius
- Metacharis regalis indissimilis
- Monethe albertus
- Monethe rudolphus
- Necyria vetulonia
- Necyria zaneta
- Notheme eumaus
- Nymphidium azanoides amazonensis
- Nymphidium baeotia
- Nymphidium balbinus
- Nymphidium cachrus ascolia
- Nymphidium caricae
- Nymphidium chimborazium
- Nymphidium lamis
- Nymphidium lisimon plintobaphis
- Nymphidium mantus
- Nymphidium menalcus ascolia
- Nymphidium menalcus platea
- Nymphidium minuta
- Nymphidium nematostichtum
- Nymphidium ninias
- Nymphidium nisimias
- Nymphidium valbinus
- Nymphidium velabrum
- Pandemos pasiphae
- Parnes nycteis
- Perophthalma lasus
- Phaenochitonia iasis
- Phaenochitonia ignipicta
- Rhetus arcius
- Rhetus dysonii
- Rhetus laodome
- Rhetus periander
- Riodina lysippus
- Sarota acanthoides spicata
- Sarota acantus
- Sarota chrysus
- Setabis epitus
- Setabis flamula
- Setabis gelanise
- Siseme alectryo alectryo
- Siseme alectryo megala
- Siseme alectryo spectanda
- Siseme alectryo tantilla
- Siseme aristoteles minerva
- Siseme aristoteles sprucei
- Siseme neurodes caudalis
- Siseme pallas angustior
- Siseme pedias
- Stalachtis calliope calliope
- Stalachtis euterpe latefasciata
- Symmachia accusatrix
- Symmachia threissa
- Symmachia tricolor
- Synargis abaris
- Synargis arctos tytia
- Synargis cyneas
- Synargis menalcus
- Synargis ochra
- Synargis orestes
- Synargis phylleus
- Synargis praeclara
- Synargis victrix
- Themone poecila
- Theope acosma
- Theope agesila
- Theope eudocia
- Theope leucanthe
- Theope pedias
- Theope sericea
- Theope virgilius
- Thestius pholeus
- Thisbe irenea irenea
- Thisbe molela
- Uraneis hyalina
- Uraneis ucubis

== See also ==
- List of butterflies of the Amazon River basin and the Andes
