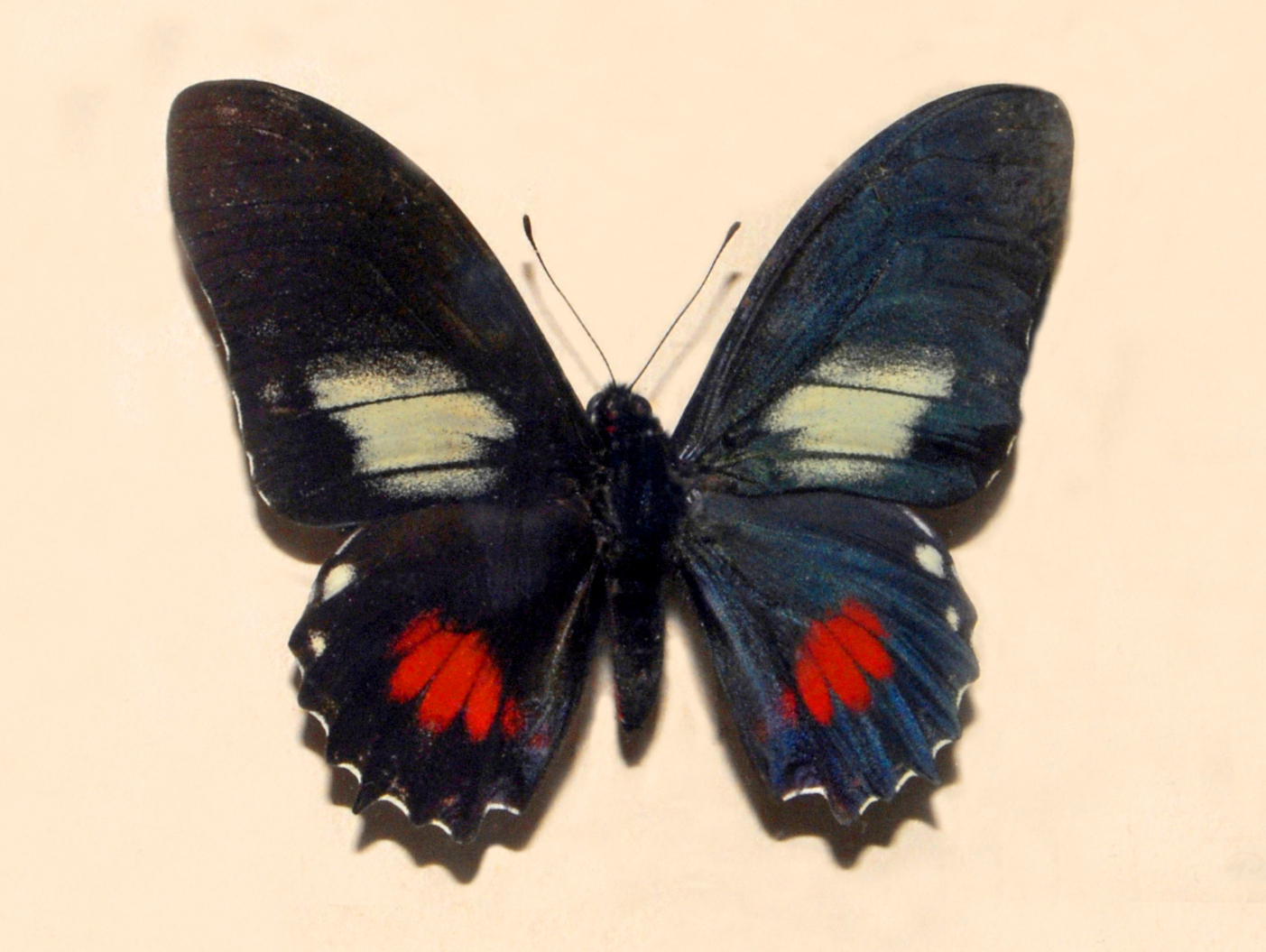
- Mounted specimen on display at Museo di Scienze Naturali Enrico Caffi, Bergamo

Scientific classification
- Kingdom: Animalia
- Phylum: Arthropoda
- Clade: Pancrustacea
- Class: Insecta
- Order: Lepidoptera
- Family: Papilionidae
- Genus: Mimoides
- Species: M. euryleon

Binomial name
- Mimoides euryleon (Hewitson, [1856])

Synonyms
- Papilio euryleon Hewitson, 1856 (Colombia); Papilio euryleon abadiae Apolinar, 1916; Papilio clusoculis Butler, 1872 (Costa Rica and Panama); Papilio euryleon pithonius Rothschild & Jordan, 1906 (false cattleheart swallowtail) (Colombia); Protesilaus euryleon pleiades Johnson & Matusik, 1987; Papilio euryleon haenschi Rothschild & Jordan, 1906; Papilio euryleon anatmus Rothschild & Jordan, 1906 (Ecuador); Papilio euryleon anatmus f. punctata Niepelt, 1909; Papilio euryleon var. insidiosa Boullet & Le Cerf, 1912; Mimoides euryleon rodriquezi Le Crom, Constantino & Salazar, 2002 (Colombia)

= Mimoides euryleon =

False cattleheart swallowtail

Species of butterfly

Mimoides euryleon, the false cattleheart swallowtail, is a species of butterfly in the family Papilionidae.

== Subspecies ==
- M. e. euryleon - Colombia
- M. e. clusoculis (Butler, 1872) - Costa Rica, Panama
- M. e. pithonius (Rothschild & Jordan, 1906) - Colombia
- M. e. haenschi (Rothschild & Jordan, 1906) - Ecuador
- M. e. anatmus (Rothschild & Jordan, 1906) - Ecuador
- M. e. rodriquezi Le Crom, Constantino & Salazar, 2002 - Colombia

== Description ==
Mimoides euryleon has a wingspan reaching 68–78 millimetres (2.7–3.1 in). The basic color of the wings is iridescent black or dark brown, with white patches on the dorsal sides of the forewings and red patches on the hindwings. Also the undersides of the wings are iridescent black or dark brown, with small red spots in the basal area of the hindwings.

== Description from Seitz ==
P. euryleon. The spots of the breast and abdomen red, the posterior abdominal segments with red lateral spots. Forewing above with yellowish grey area before the hindmargin, hindwing with red discal area or band. Beneath the forewing without red basal spot, the hindwing with three, but the spot placed in the cell commonly only indicated or quite absent, the discal band smaller than above, pale red. Female similar to the male or different from it; in the latter case forewing with cell-spot and two discal bands, all white, recalling pausanius and protodamas f. choridamas. Scent-organ of the male usually present. Costa Rica toEcuador. — clusoculis Butl. (13 c). Discal area of the forewing white-grey; the red band of the hindwing broad, always entering the cell. Female similar to the male, the red band of the hindwing somewhat broader. Costa Rica; Chiriqui. — pithonius R. & J. Male: forewing with small or large grey spot; hindwing with 3—5 red discal spots, the red submarginal spots of the under surface of the hindwing very small or only indicated. Female with large cell-spot on the forewing and 2 large discal spots. West Colombia and Cauca Valley. — euryleon Hew. (13 c). Male : hindwing above mostly with 4 spots placed close to the cell and two small, less distinct spots before the abdominal margin; the discal spots on the underside pale red. female: the cell-spot of the forewing narrowed anteriorly, the band of the hindwing entering the cell. Magdalena Valley, Cordillera of Bogota. — haenschi R. & J. Male :area of the forewing lighter grey than in euryleon composed of two spots, the anterior spot projecting distally; hindwing with small cell-spot, which is rarely absent, and 3—5 spots placed close to the cell; beneath the forewing has a large white spot between the 1. and 2. median, a grey- spot behind it; hind-wing with 3 pale red spots, the 1. and 2. touching the cell, a 4. spot often indicated. female: the cell-patch of the forewing does not extend across the cell, band of the hindwing running from the 1. radial to the abdominal margin, entering the cell, behind the cell proximally whitish, as in the female of the aristolochia-Papilio P. iphidamas calogyna. Male with scent-organ. In Western Ecuador. — anatmus R & J. male : the grey area of the forewing extending from the hindmargin costad as far as the 2. median or beyond, often a grey streak in the cell; hindwing with 3 red spots, separated from the cell, often only the 3. spot distinct; beneath the forewing without white spot and the discal spots of the hindwing usually grey. Female not known. Scent-organ absent in the male. East Ecuador.

== Distribution and habitat ==
This species is widespread in the Neotropical realm, in Costa Rica, Panama, Colombia, and Ecuador. It lives in the Andes at an elevation between 600 and 1600 m.

== Biology ==
Caterpillars feed on Annona glabra and Guatteria oliviformis.

== Gallery ==
The Hewitson plate accompanying the original description in Illustrations of New Species of Exotic Butterflies 1856

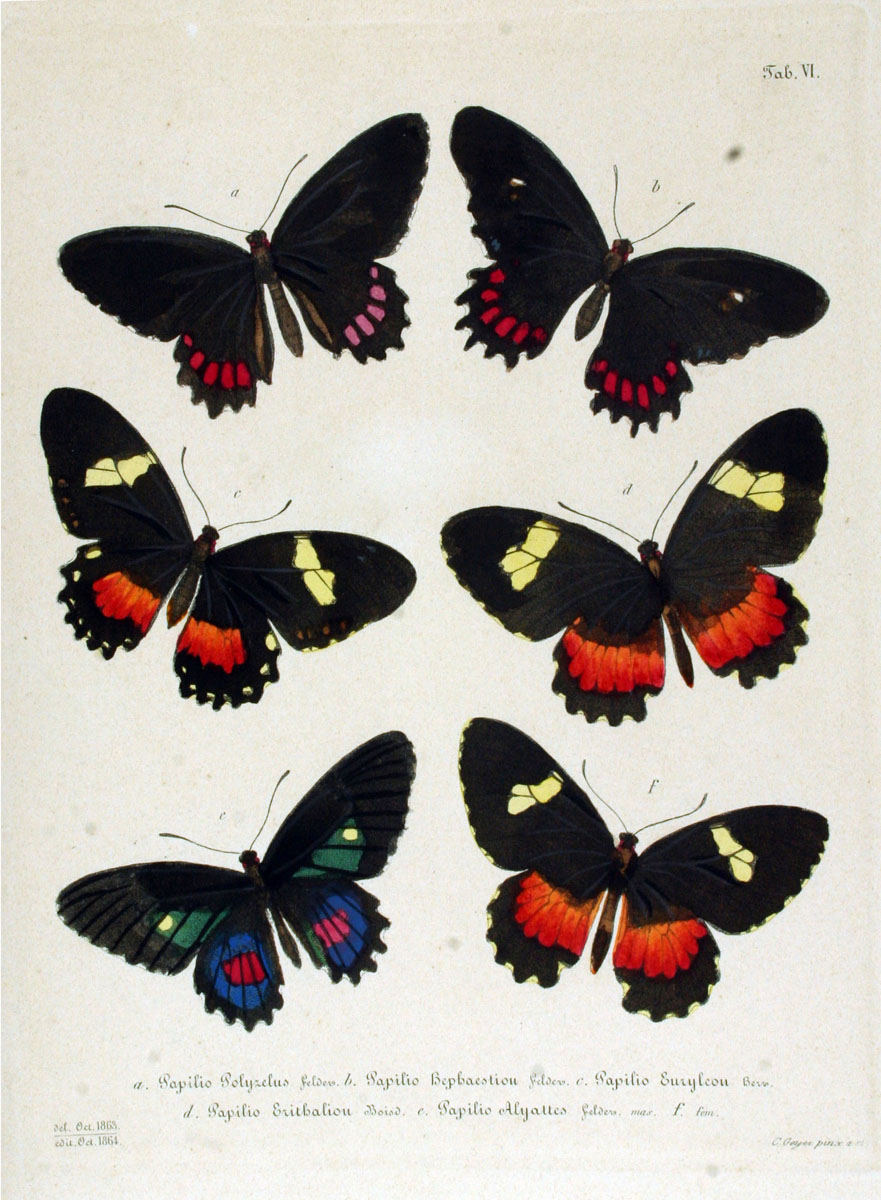

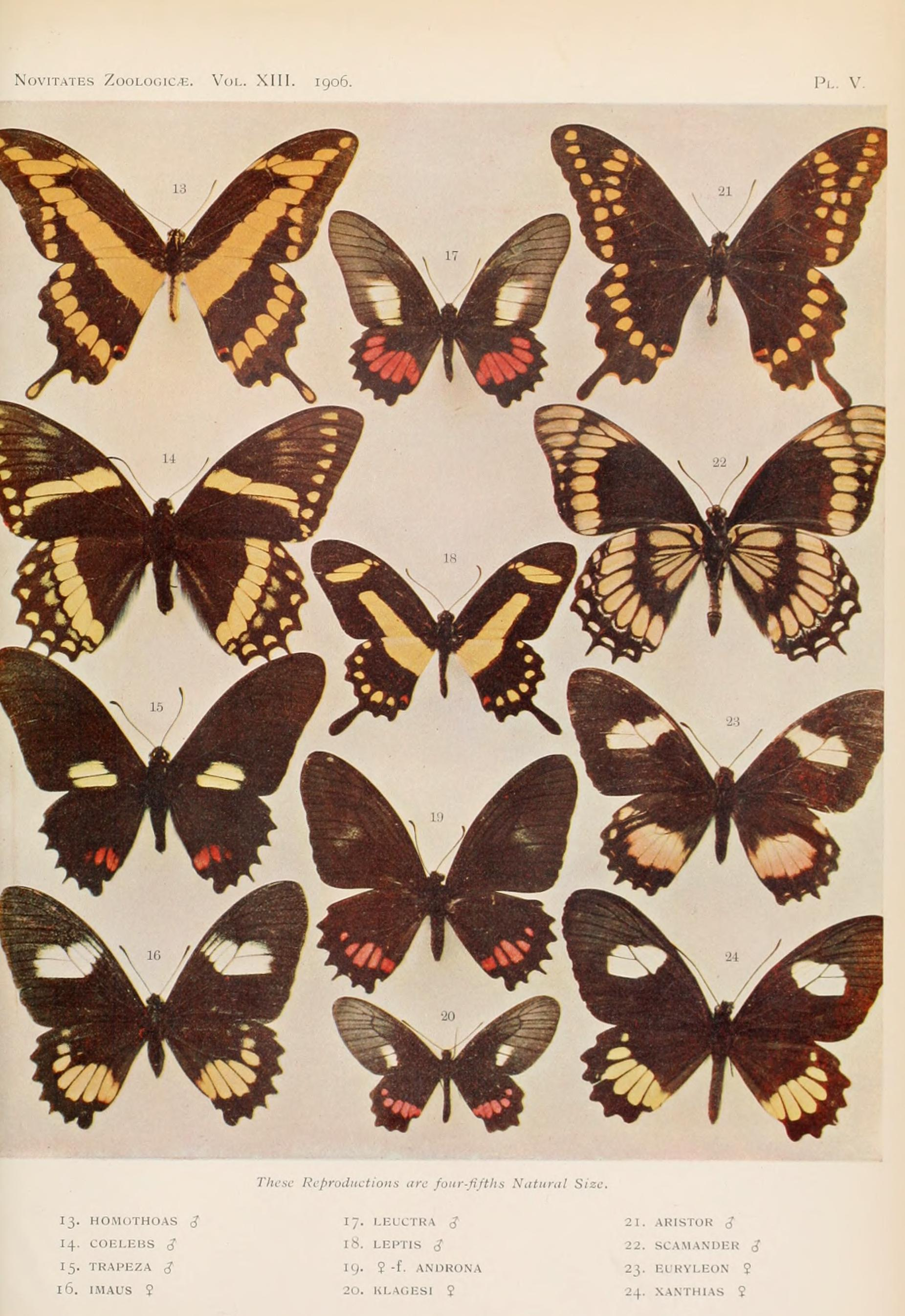

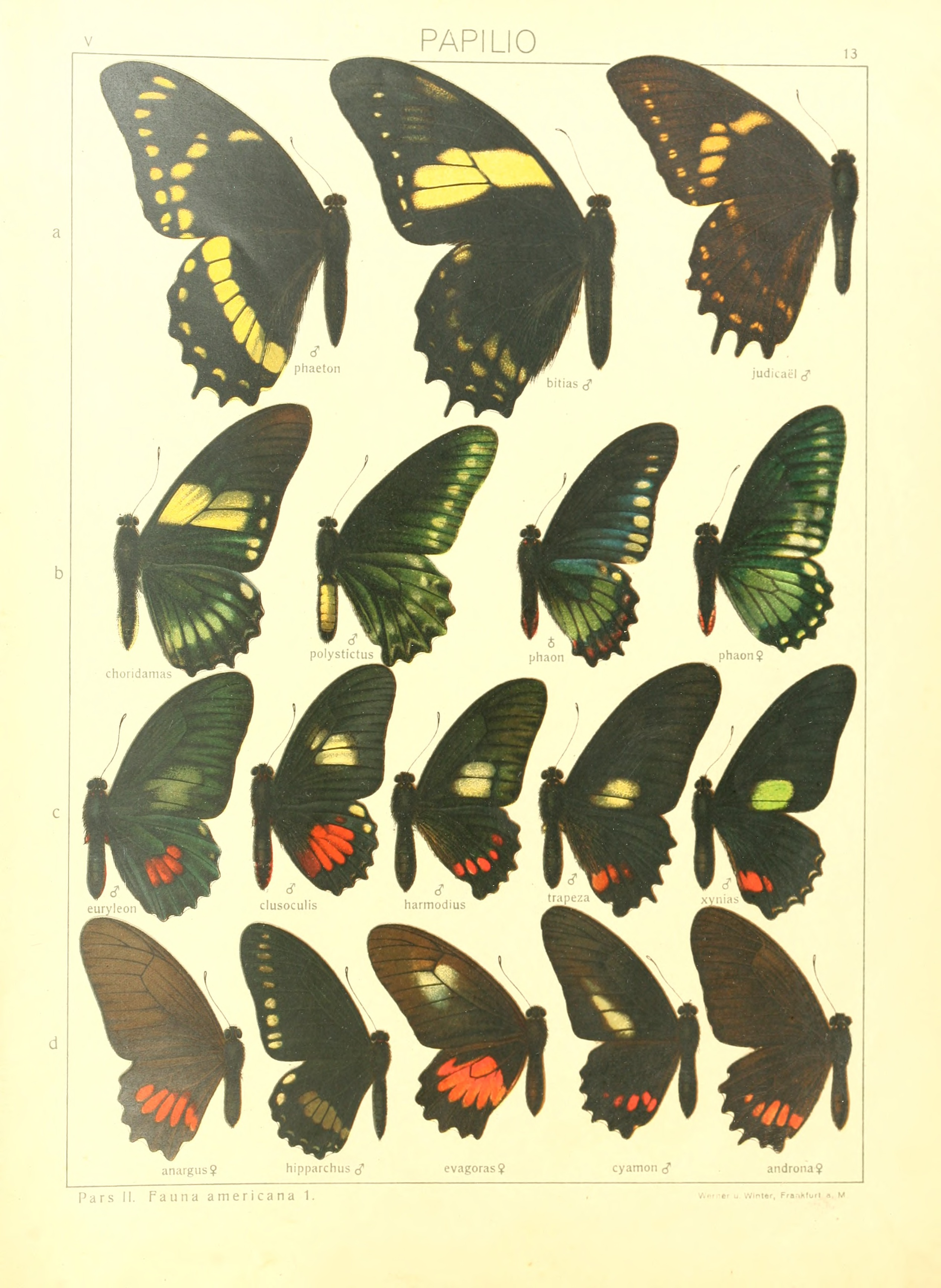
Seitz Plate 13
