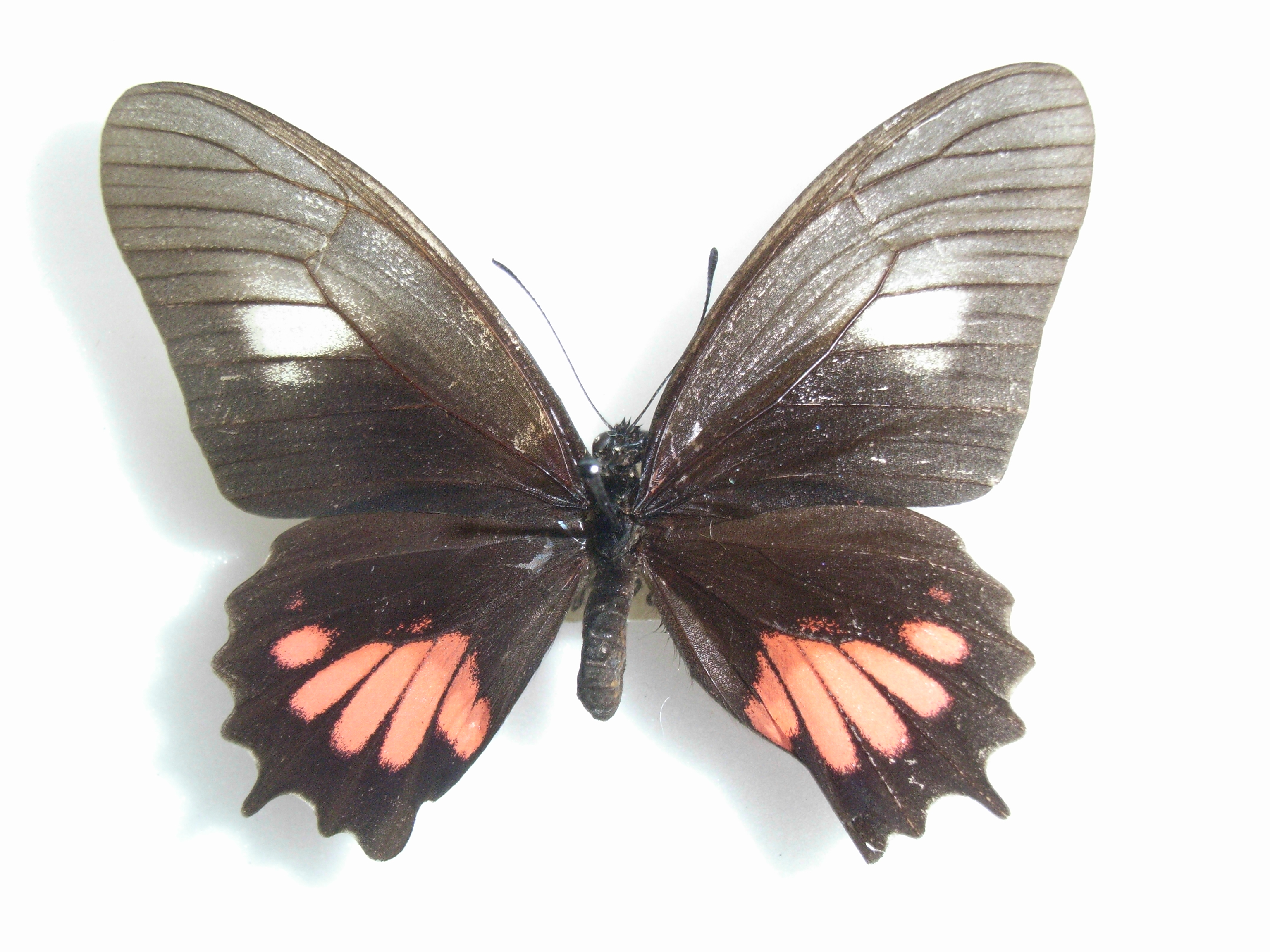
- Female M. a. ariarathes

Scientific classification
- Kingdom: Animalia
- Phylum: Arthropoda
- Clade: Pancrustacea
- Class: Insecta
- Order: Lepidoptera
- Family: Papilionidae
- Genus: Mimoides
- Species: M. ariarathes

Binomial name
- Mimoides ariarathes (Esper, 1788)

= Mimoides ariarathes =

Species of butterfly

Mimoides ariarathes is a species of butterfly in the family Papilionidae. It is native to South America.

== Subspecies ==
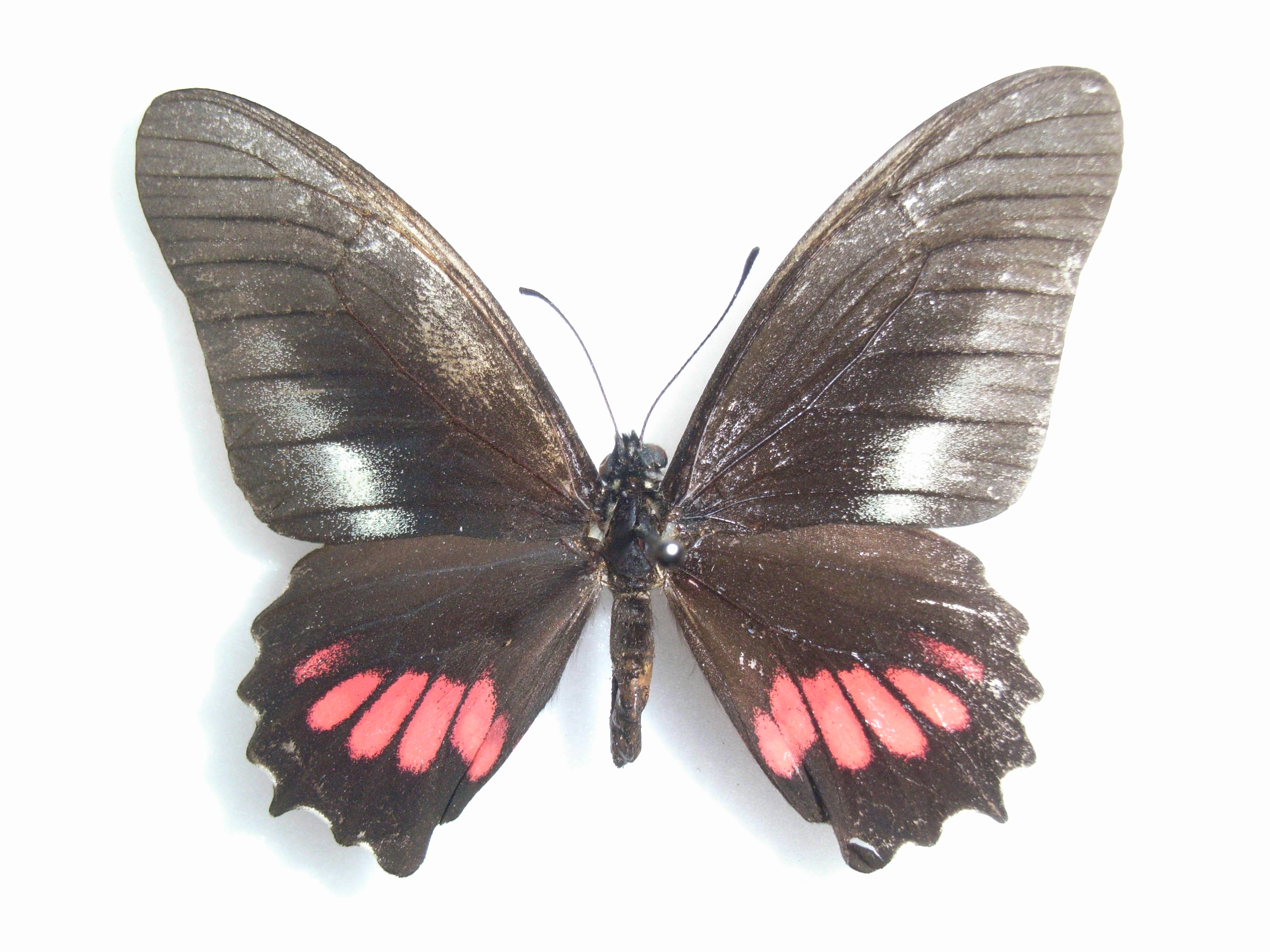
M. a. gayi

- M. a. ariarathes (Esper, 1788) Guianas, Surinam, Brazil (Pará)
- M. a. arianus (Staudinger, 1884) Brazil (Amazonas), Peru
- M. a. demerara K.S. Brown & Lamas, 1994 Guyana
- M. a. evagorides K.S. Brown, & Lamas, 1994 Venezuela
- M. a. gayi (Lucas, 1852) Colombia to Bolivia, Peru, Ecuador, Brazil (Amazonas, Mato Grosso)
- M. a. illuminatus (Niepelt, 1928) Colombia
- M. a. leuctra (Rothschild & Jordan, 1906) Brazil (Goiás)
- M. a. metagenes (Rothschild & Jordan, 1906) Brazil (Pará)

== Description from Seitz ==
P. ariarathes. Another widely distributed and very variable species, which has more spiny tibiae and a narrower cell in the hindwing than the allied species. Spots on head and breast yellowish grey. Forewing beneath with 2 red basal spots, the hindwing with 3. In the male the forewing usually with greywhite or yellowish band or area from the hindmargin forwards; hindwing with red discal spots, of which often only the one placed at the abdominal margin is distinct. Female almost always with white discal spots on the forewing. Scent-scales of the male present. Larva unknown. Colombia to Bolivia, distributed eastwards to Para and Goyaz. The butterfly is individually and geographically variable; the females resemble the females of Aristolochia-Papilios and adopt in the different districts their likewise variable dress. The forms all intergrade, 6 geographical forms can be differentiated, whether correctly must be ascertained by further investigations based on a larger material than we have seen. The butterfly according to Bates flies with great rapidity in sunny places near plantations; it is no rarity, but is not taken in great numbers. — ariarathes Esp. (= acestes Boisd) (14 a). Male : forewing with large white spot from the hindmargin to the 2. median, almost as large beneath as above; on the hindwing 4 to 6 separated discal spots, placed separate from one another and from the cell. Female with 5 or 6 red discal spots on the hindwing, three long, extending nearly or quite to the cell; in female-f [form] ariarathes Esp. the forewing has 1 to 3 white discal spots and often a narrow cellspot; in female-f. eumelea R. & J. these white spots are only indicated. French and Dutch Guiana. — menes R. & J. Male : forewing with white band, extending from the hindmargin to the 1. or 2. median, the posterior spot often small or absent, the spot before the 2. median 4–6 mm. long, also always present beneath; hindwing with 3 or 4 red spots midway between cell and margin. Female with large discal spot from the 3. radial to the 1. median and a smaller one behind it, sometimes also with indication of spots before the 3. radial and i(13d). Male: forewing with narrow band, placed at the 3. radial about midway between cell and outer margin or nearer to the cell; beneath the band is replaced by 2 or 3 distinct spots; discal spot of the hindwing partly near to the cell, the band more curved than in the other forms. 2 with 3 white or yellowish discal spots and a rather large cell-spot on the forewing; the apical half or two-thirds of the cell of the hindwing red, as are also 6 large discal spots, abdominal margin at least partly red. Venezuela. — metagenes R. & J. Male: forewing usually with a band reaching from the hindmargin to beyond the 3 radial, merely indicated on the underside; hindwing with 4 or 5 spots placed separate from the cell. Female: forewing with the long white discal band which is also peculiar to the Aristolochia-Papilios P. anchises thelios and P. aglaope, this band consists of two large spots with a smaller one placed before and behind them; hindwing with 6 red spots, 3 of which are contiguous to the cell. Para. — gayi Lucas. Male and female very variable : 3 principal forms: f. anargus R.& J. (13d), forewing without band or spots; f. cyamon Gray (= charoba Kirby (13d), Male with narrow band on the forewing, on the whole somewhat more distally placed than in the male of evagoras, female with narrow, indistinct band on the forewing, with cell-spot on the hindwing, the spots on the hindwing sometimes yellowish white; in f. gayi Luc. (= aristagoras Fldr.; arianus Staud.) the male has on the forewing a more or less square hindmarginal spot, whilst the ? has 1 or 2 lai'ge discal spots, usually also a small third spot and often a cell-spot in addition. These different forms are not separated geographically. Distributed from Colombia to Bolivia and the Amazon downwards to Manaos. — leuctra R. & J. Male:forewing with a pure white area, of almost even width, reaching from the hindmargin to the 1. median, above about 6 mm. broad and on the underside only a trifle narrower: hindwing with 6 long red discal spots, the 3 middle ones contiguous to the cell. Goyaz, Brazil.

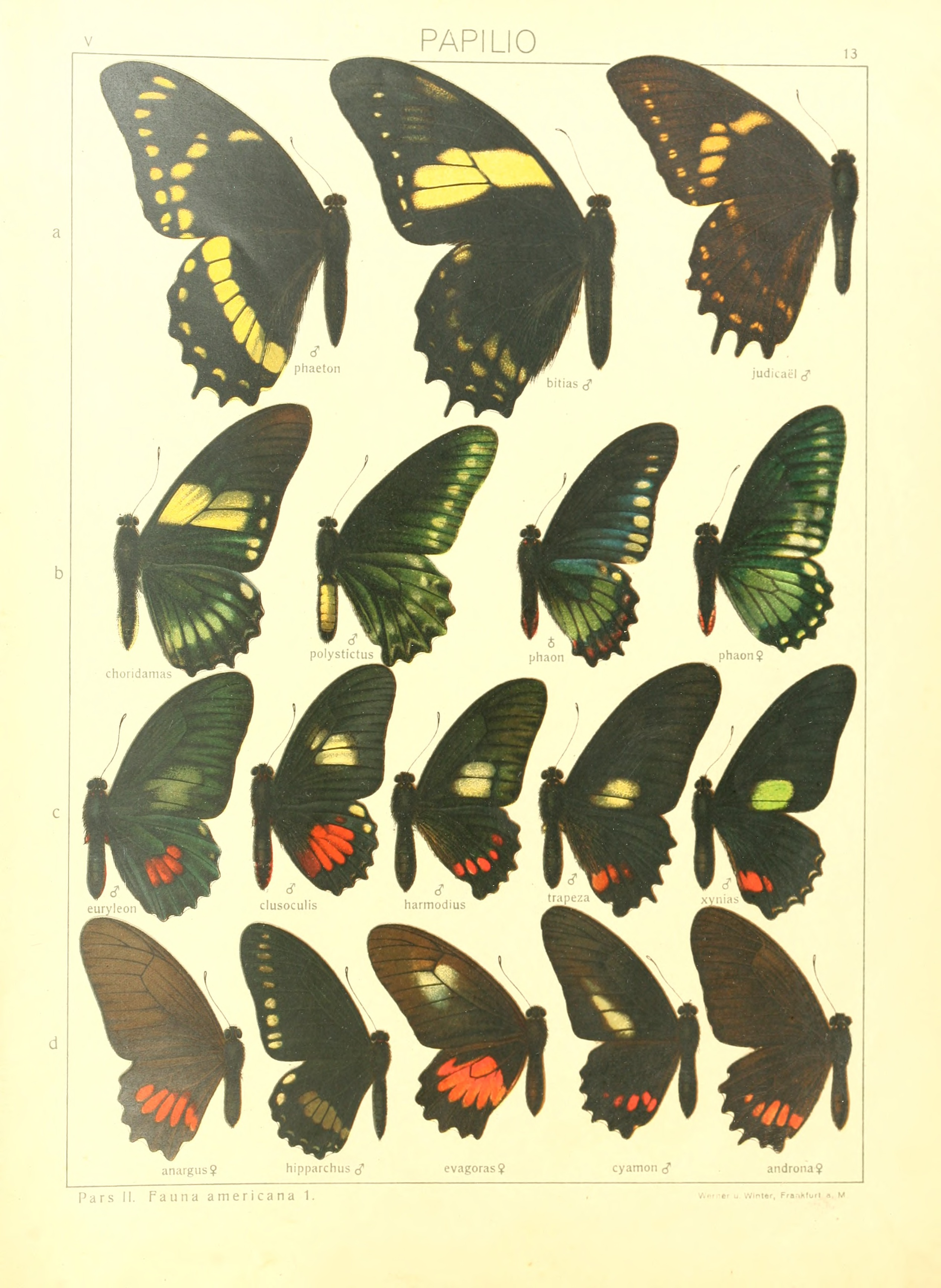
Seitz Plate 13

Seitz Plate 14
