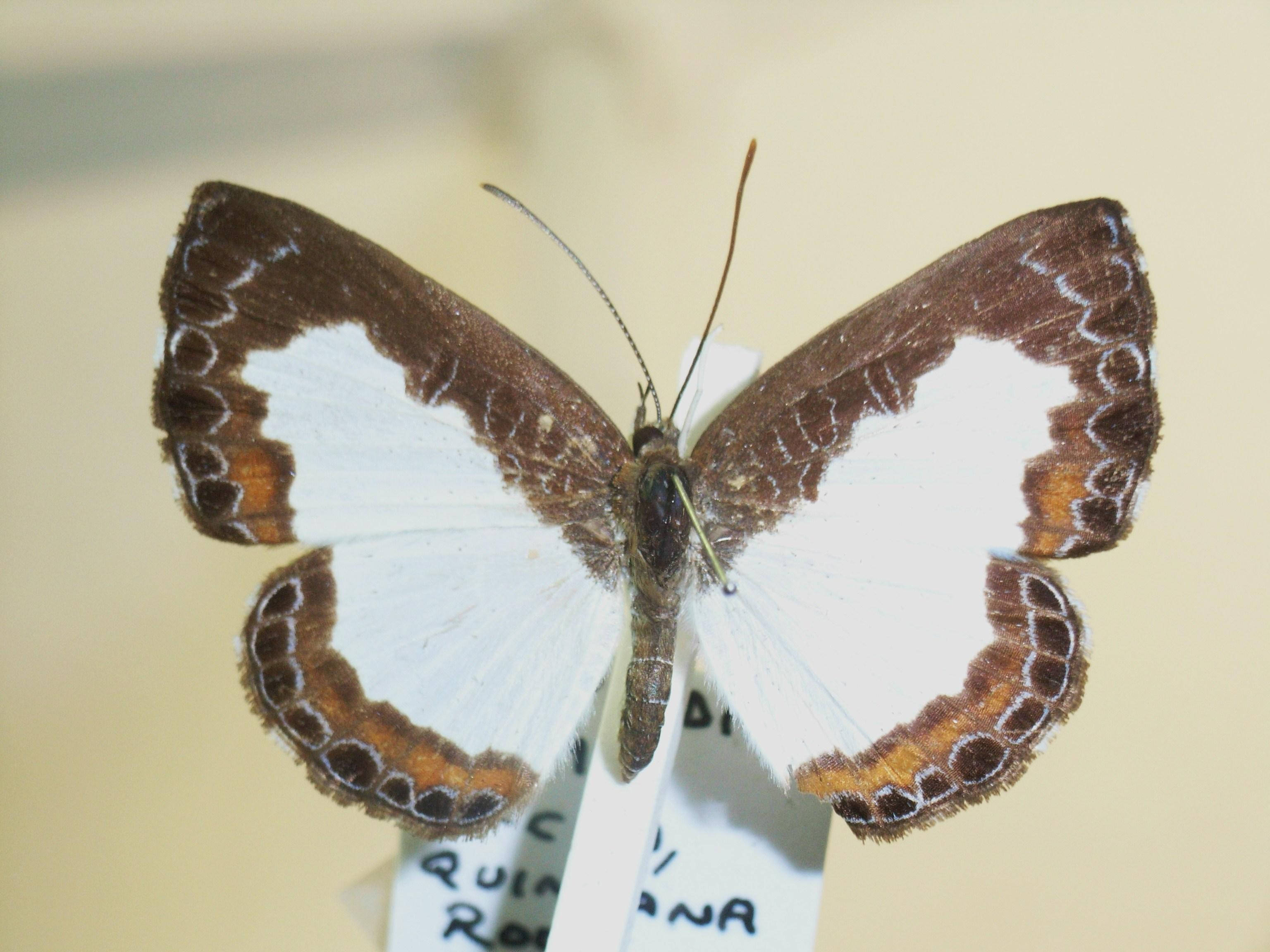

Scientific classification
- Kingdom: Animalia
- Phylum: Arthropoda
- Class: Insecta
- Order: Lepidoptera
- Family: Riodinidae
- Genus: Juditha
- Species: J. azan

Binomial name
- Juditha azan (Westwood, [1851])

Synonyms
- Nymphidium azan Westwood, [1851]; Desmozona azan var. australis C. Felder, 1862; Juditha majorina Brévignon & Gallard, 1998; Papilio lamis Stoll, [1780] (preocc. Cramer, 1779); Juditha azan lamiola Mielke & Casagrande, 1992 (nom. nud.); Pepla lamis; Juditha lamis; Nymphidium lamis; Nymphidium completa Lathy, 1904

= Juditha azan =

Species of butterfly

Juditha azan is a butterfly of the family Riodinidae. It is found in most of South America.

== Subspecies ==
The following subspecies are recognised:

- Juditha azan azan (Brazil (Rio de Janeiro))
- Juditha azan majorina (Guianas, Brazil (Amazon to Mato Grosso), Venezuela, Trinidad)
- Juditha azan completa (western Brazil, western Amazon, Colombia, Peru, Bolivia)
