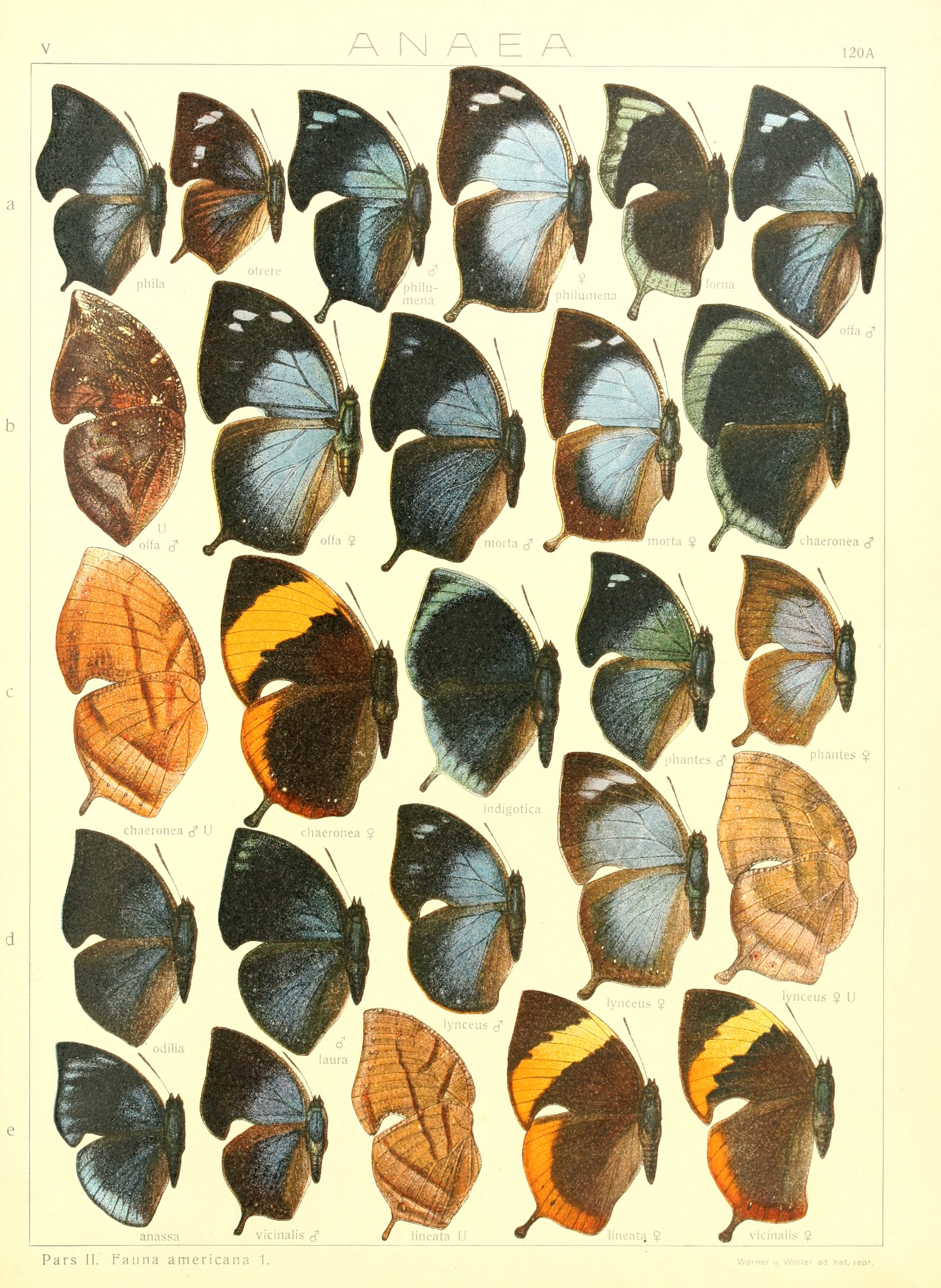

Scientific classification
- Kingdom: Animalia
- Phylum: Arthropoda
- Class: Insecta
- Order: Lepidoptera
- Family: Nymphalidae
- Tribe: Anaeini
- Genus: Memphis
- Species: M. lineata

Binomial name
- Memphis lineata (Salvin, 1869)

= Memphis lineata =

Species of butterfly

Memphis lineata is a species of leafwing found in South America (Colombia, Bolivia, Ecuador, Brazil and Peru).

Memphis lineata is a butterfly with a wingspan of about 58 mm, with forewings with a humped costal edge, pointed apex, concave outer edge near the apex, hooked inner angle and concave inner edge. Each hindwing has a tail that is sometimes very minimal. The upper part of the male is slate blue with a slate blue basal part on the forewings and the majority of the wing almost black with a few blue spots near the apex and the slate blue hindwings with the dark grey apex. Females are light brown with a purple basal suffusion. The reverse side is golden beige to greyish-brown and simulates a dead leaf. Seitz- a species of very different sexes. The upper surface of the female resembles that of a schausiana (120 C a), but it has a fainter blue decoration, especially on the hindwing and the apical part of the forewing is without spots. The under surface is marked like in indigotica (120 Cb), of which it has also the faint hue of violet- pink which is spread across the under surface and is of an especially magnificent lustre in the sun.

Biotope - Memphis lineata lives at altitudes up to 3,000 m.
