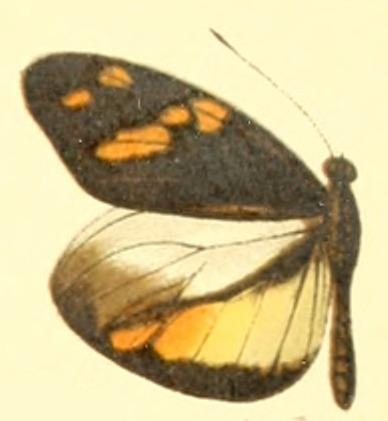
- Male
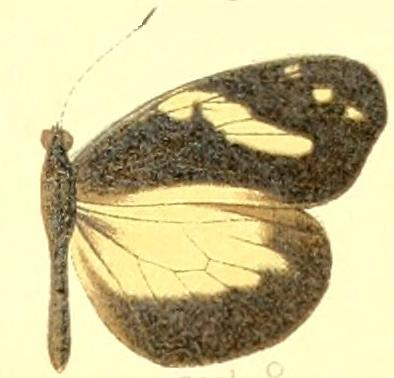
- Female

Scientific classification
- Kingdom: Animalia
- Phylum: Arthropoda
- Clade: Pancrustacea
- Class: Insecta
- Order: Lepidoptera
- Family: Pieridae
- Genus: Dismorphia
- Species: D. zaela

Binomial name
- Dismorphia zaela (Hewitson, [1858])

Synonyms
- Leptalis zaela Hewitson, [1858]; Dismorphia ines Röber, 1909; Leptalis oreas Salvin, 1871

= Dismorphia zaela =

Zaela mimic white

Species of butterfly

Dismorphia zaela, the zaela mimic white, is a butterfly in the family Pieridae. It is found from Costa Rica to Ecuador.

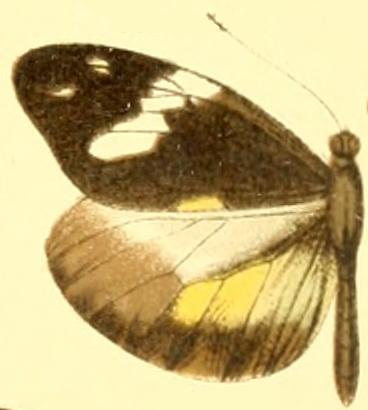
Dismorphia zaela abilene male

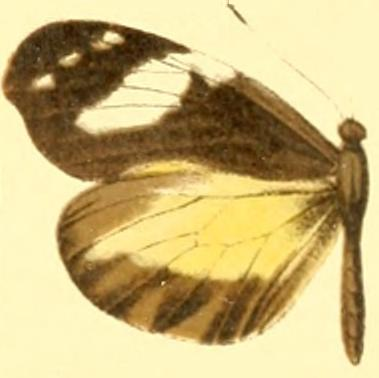
Dismorphia zaela abilene female

Their wingspan is about 54 mm (2.1 in).

The larvae feed on Inga species, including Inga pittieri.

== Subspecies ==
The following subspecies are recognised:

- Dismorphia zaela zaela (Ecuador)
- Dismorphia zaela abilene (Hewitson, [1872]) (Ecuador)
- Dismorphia zaela oreas (Salvin, 1871) (Costa Rica, Panama)
