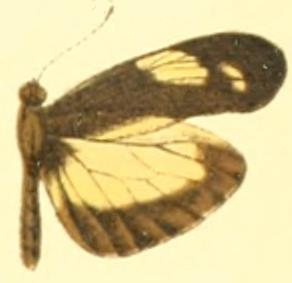
- D. z. demeter

Scientific classification
- Kingdom: Animalia
- Phylum: Arthropoda
- Clade: Pancrustacea
- Class: Insecta
- Order: Lepidoptera
- Family: Pieridae
- Genus: Dismorphia
- Species: D. zathoe

Binomial name
- Dismorphia zathoe (Hewitson, [1858])

Synonyms
- Leptalis zathoe Hewitson, [1858]; Dismorphia albimacula Röber, 1924; Dismorphia pallidula Butler & H. Druce, 1874; Papilio eribotes Linnaeus, 1758 (nom. dub.); Dismorphia demeter confluens Apolinar, 1926 (nom. dub.)

= Dismorphia zathoe =

Zathoe mimic white

Species of butterfly

Dismorphia zathoe, the zathoe mimic white is a butterfly in the family Pieridae. The species was first described by William Chapman Hewitson in 1858. It is found in Central America and northern South America.

The wingspan is 22–25 mm (0.87–0.98 in).

The larvae feed on Inga species, including I. densiflora and I. venusta.

== Subspecies ==
The following subspecies are recognised:

- D. z. zathoe (Colombia)
- D. z. core (C. Felder & R. Felder, 1861) (Venezuela)
- D. z. othoe (Hewitson, 1867) (Ecuador, Colombia)
- D. z. pallidula Butler & H. Druce, 1874 (Costa Rica, Panama)
- D. z. proserpina Grose-Smith & Kirby, 1897 (Guyana)
- D. z. demeter Röber, 1909 (Colombia)

== Gallery ==
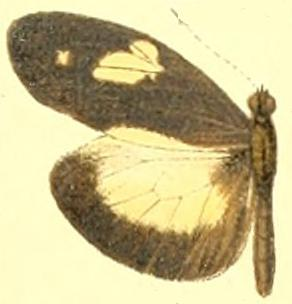
D. z. othoe male

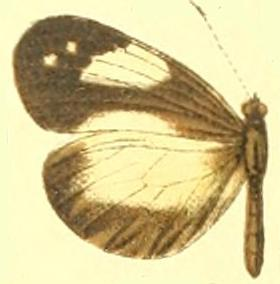
D. z. othoe female

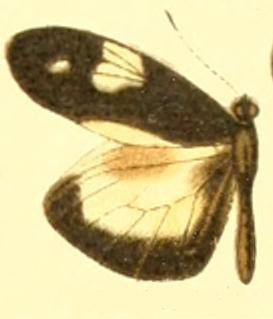
D. z. pallidula male

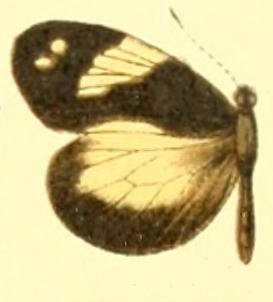
D. z. pallidula female
