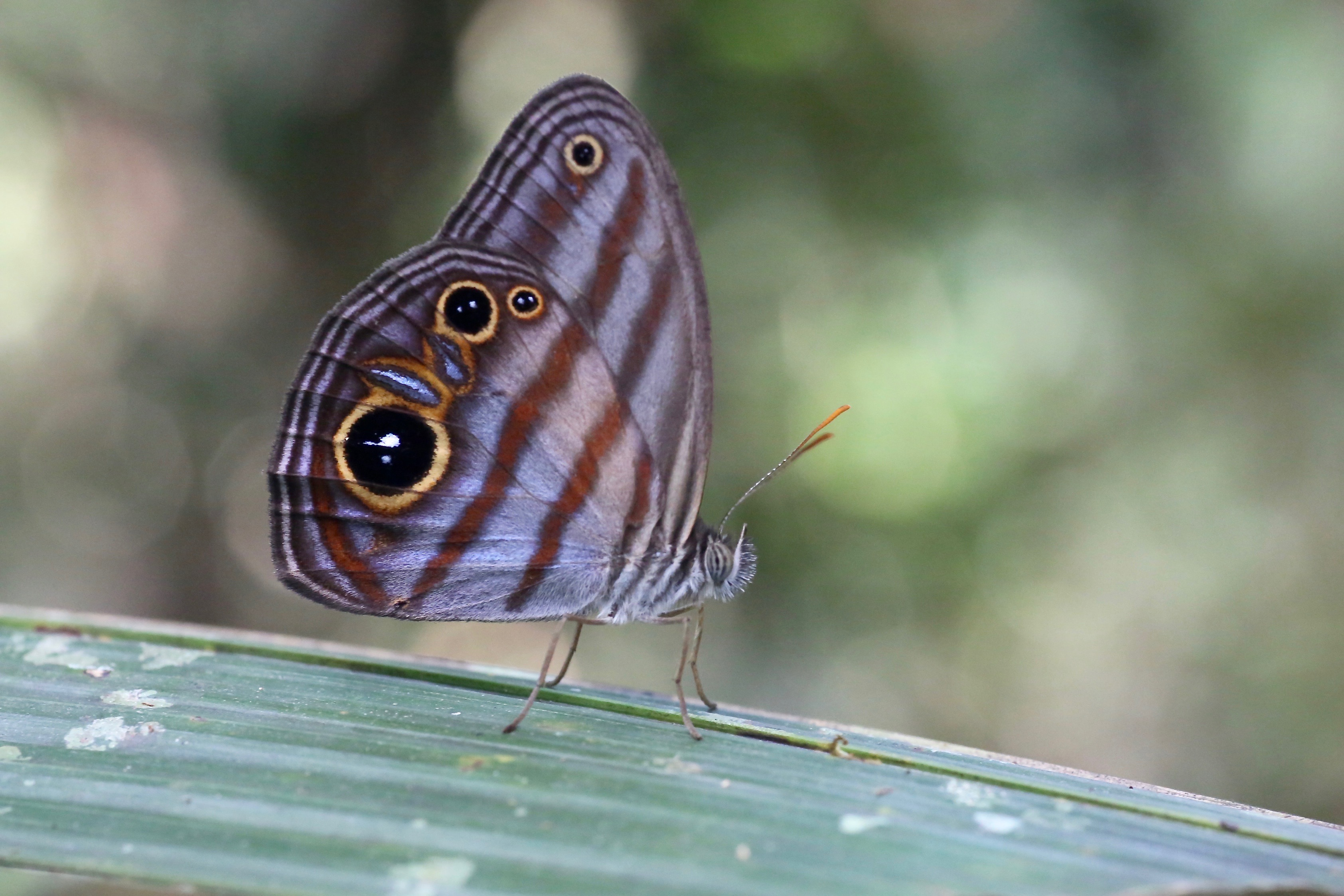

Scientific classification
- Kingdom: Animalia
- Phylum: Arthropoda
- Clade: Pancrustacea
- Class: Insecta
- Order: Lepidoptera
- Family: Nymphalidae
- Genus: Chloreuptychia
- Species: C. agatha

Binomial name
- Chloreuptychia agatha (Butler, 1867)

Synonyms
- Euptychia agatha Butler, 1867; Euptychia chloris f. agathina Weymer, 1911

= Chloreuptychia agatha =

Species of butterfly

Chloreuptychia agatha is a species of butterfly in the family Nymphalidae. It is found in Colombia, Ecuador, and Brazil (Amazon region).
