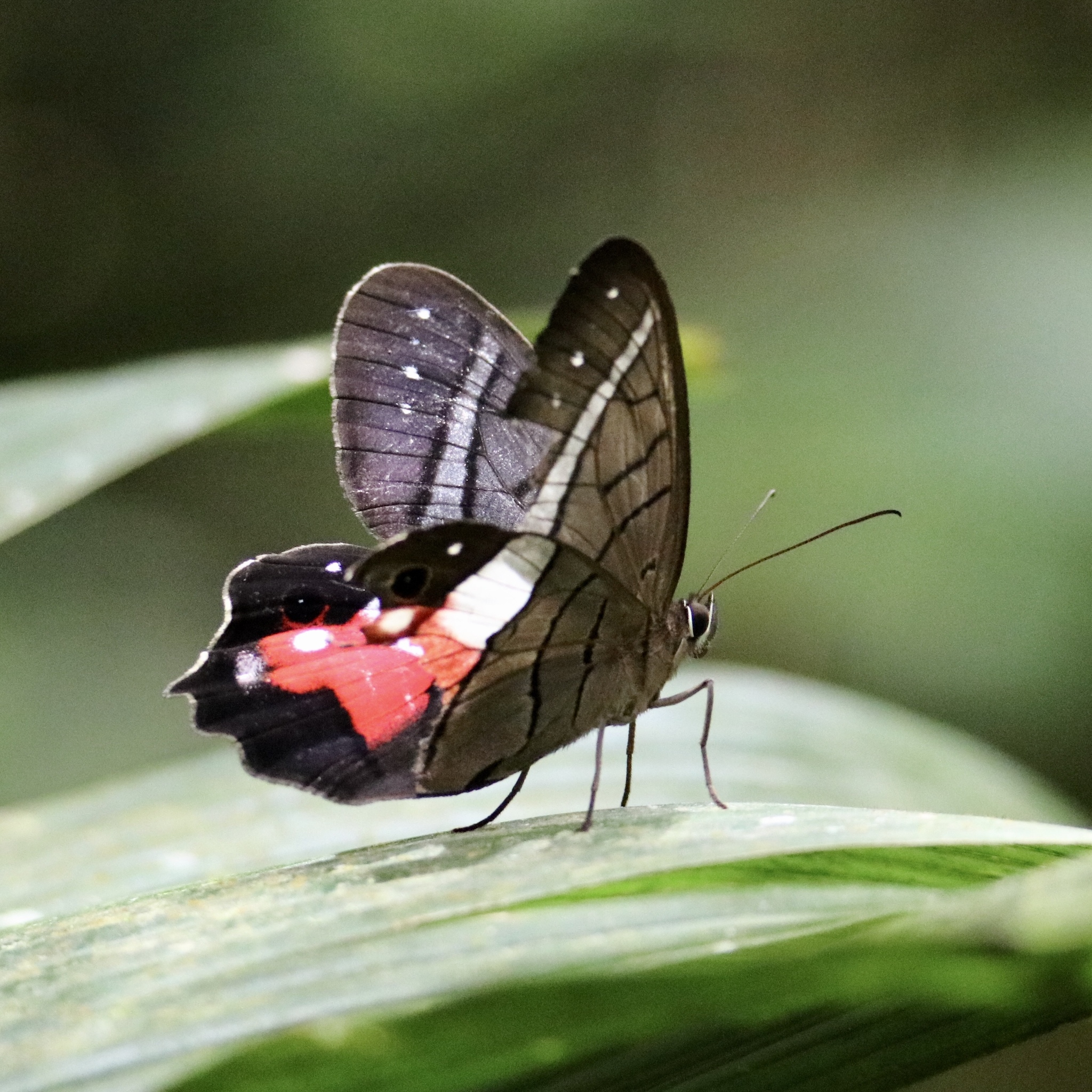
- Pierella helvina ocreata
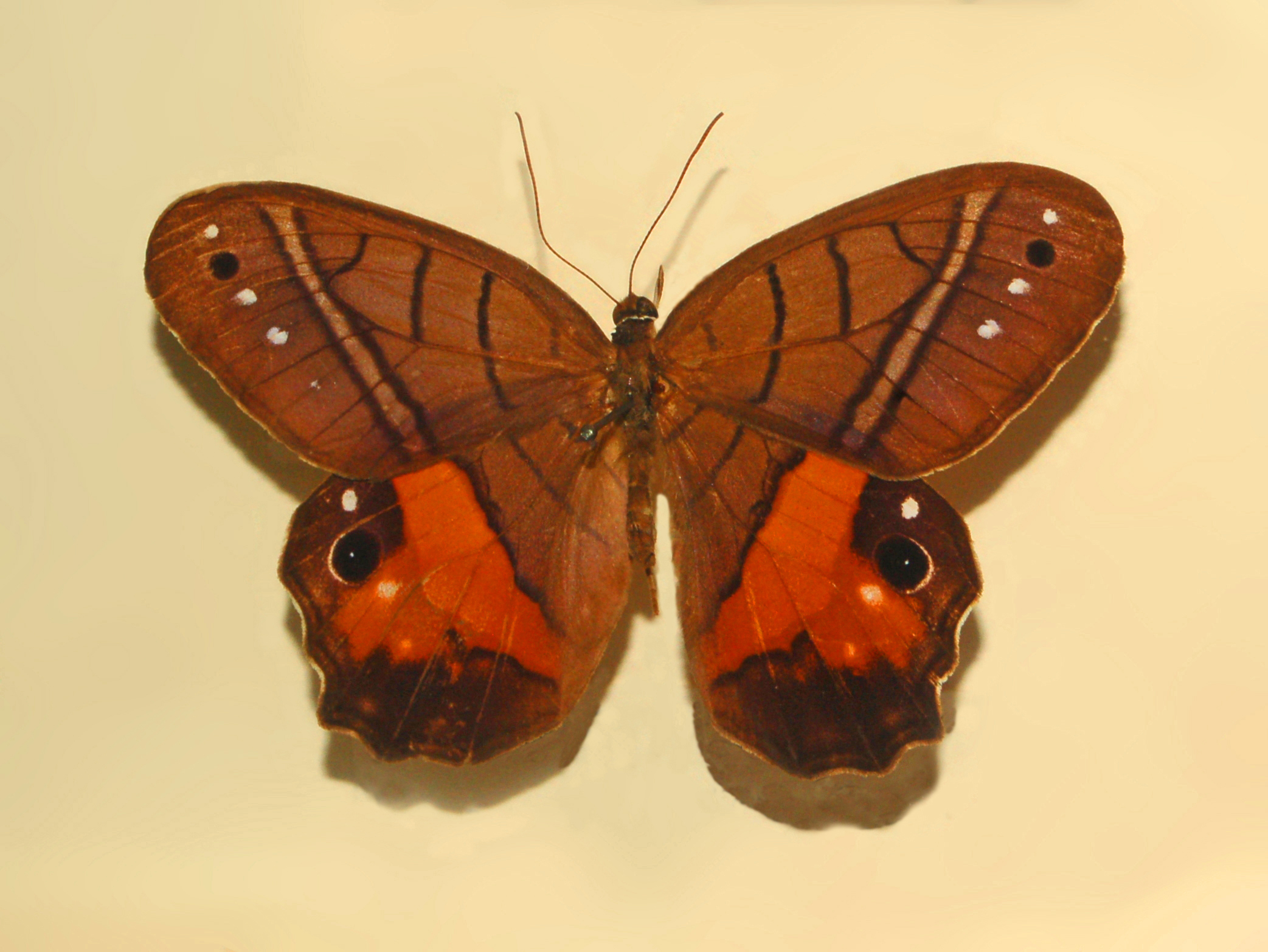
- Mounted specimen from Colombia

Scientific classification
- Domain: Eukaryota
- Kingdom: Animalia
- Phylum: Arthropoda
- Class: Insecta
- Order: Lepidoptera
- Family: Nymphalidae
- Genus: Pierella
- Species: P. helvina

Binomial name
- Pierella helvina (Hewitson, 1859)

Synonyms
- Haetera helvina, Hewitson, 1859; Pierella helvetia, D'Abrera, 1988; Pierella ocreata Godman & Salvin, 1868; Pierella incanescens Godman & Salvin, 1877; Pierella incanescens costarica Niepelt, 1927; Pierella incanescens werneri Hering & Hopp, 1925; Pierello ocreata johnsoni Talbot, 1932

= Pierella helvina =

Red-washed satyr

Species of butterfly

Pierella helvina, the red-washed satyr, is a species of nymphalid butterfly in the subfamily Satyrinae.

== Description ==
The basic colour of the wings is dark brown. The anterior wings have three black bands crossing the cell, the inner one prolonged to the inner margin. The end of the cell is also black. Two parallel black bands cross the wings from the inner margin to the costa. between these bands and the outer margin are a series of spots, the nearest the costa black, the next black and the two following white. The posterior wings have three black cross bands. Beyond the third of these bands is a large red patch. Beyond this patch the wings are darker and have a white spot and a black ocellus with the appearance of a pupil. The outer margin is deeply indented. The anal patch is dark brown.

Larva feeds on Heliconia and Calathea species.

== Distribution ==
This species can be found in Colombia, Panama, Ecuador, Nicaragua, and Costa Rica.

== Subspecies ==
- Pierella helvina helvina (Colombia)
- Pierella helvina ocreata Godman & Salvin, 1868 (Panama, Ecuador)
- Pierella helvina incanescens Godman & Salvin, 1877 (Nicaragua, Costa Rica, Panama)
- Pierella helvina hymettia Staudinger, 1886 (Colombia)
- Pierella helvina pacifica Niepelt, 1924 (Colombia)
