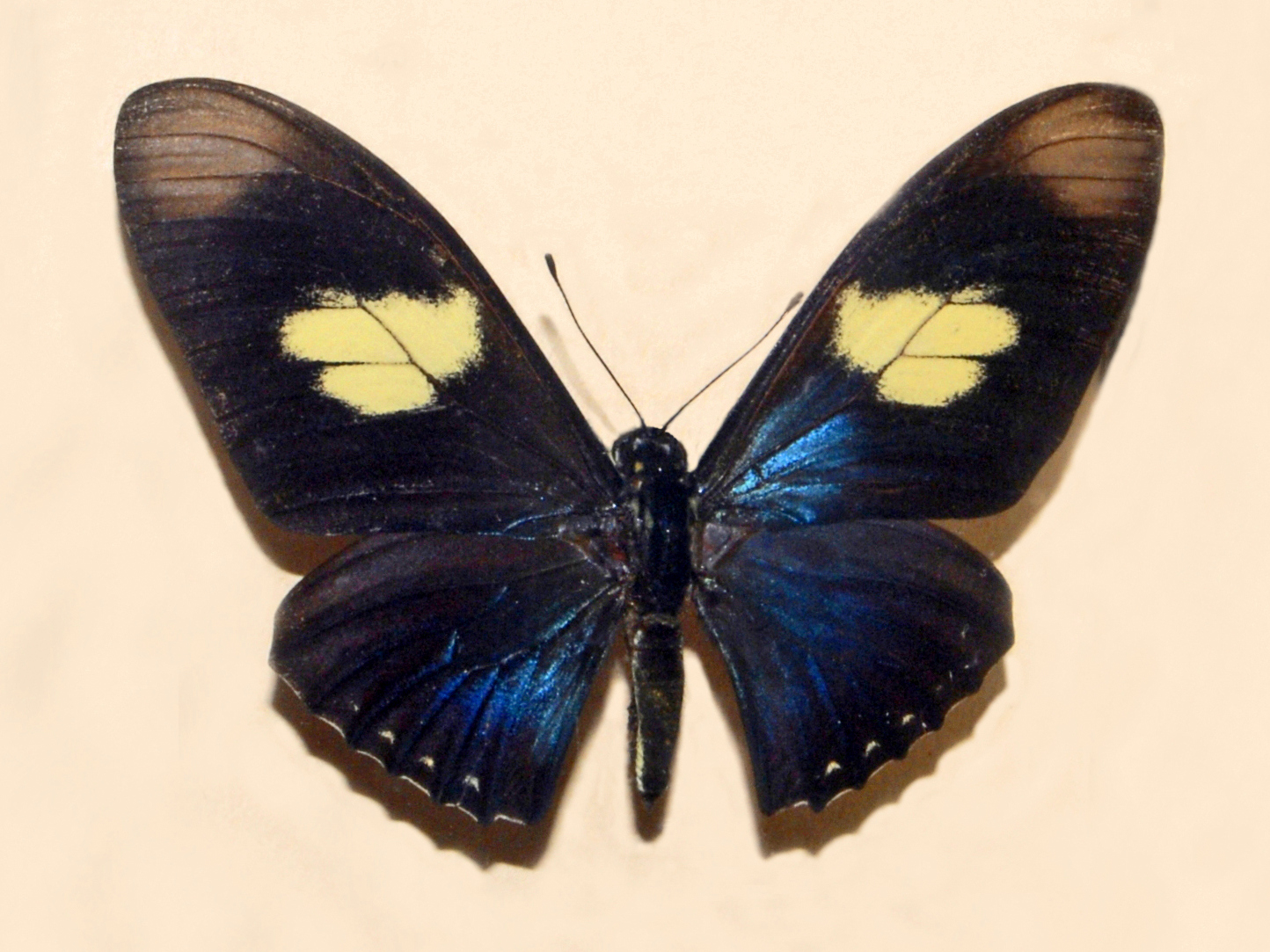
- Mounted specimen on display at Museo di Scienze Naturali Enrico Caffi, Bergamo

Scientific classification
- Kingdom: Animalia
- Phylum: Arthropoda
- Clade: Pancrustacea
- Class: Insecta
- Order: Lepidoptera
- Family: Papilionidae
- Genus: Mimoides
- Species: M. pausanias

Binomial name
- Mimoides pausanias (Hewitson, 1852)

Synonyms
- Papilio pausanias Hewitson, 1852; Papilio pausanias f. eburneomaculatus Rousseau-Decelle, 1933; Papilio pausanias f. celulata Rosa, 1934; Papilio cleombrotus Strecker, 1885; Papilio hermolaus Guenée, 1872; Papilio pausanias prasinus Rothschild & Jordan, 1906; Papilio pausanias tabaguita Kaye, 1925; Eurytides pausanias

= Mimoides pausanias =

Pausanias swallowtail

Species of butterfly

Mimoides pausanias, the Pausanias swallowtail or bluish mimic-swallowtail, is a species of butterfly in the family Papilionidae.

== Description ==
Mimoides pausanias is a large butterfly with iridescent brown color on the upper surface of the wings. The basal portion of the wings is metallic blue, in the centre of the forewing there is a large white or yellow patch, while the apex of the forewings is pale brown. Also the under surface of the wings is iridescent brown with a yellow patch and a submarginal line of bright red markings on the hindwings.

== Description from Seitz ==
P. pausanius. A copy of Heliconius clytia L. According to Bates the butterfly certainly has the sailing and circling flight of the Heliconians, yet is not, like the Heliconians, a species of the forest shades, but is found on the muddy banks of rivers and lakes or flies round the tops of high trees. Wings above green-blue, with large pale yellow area on the forewing, hindwing short, often truncate. The scent-organ is wanting in the male . The female resembles the male. From Costa Rica to Northern Brazil (Goyaz), — prasinus R. & J. Wings above strongly metallic; discal spots of the forewing longer than in the following form, the white submarginal spots of the hindwing very small, the anterior ones only indicated, the red basal spots of the underside smaller than in the remaining subspecies. Costa Rica. — cleombrotus Streck. West Colombia and probably Panama; as in prasinus the forewing without pale apical area; costal area of the upperside of the forewing almost black, in prasinus almost as metallic green as the disc; underside of the hindwing without pale (yellow-green or reddish) streaks between the veins. — pausanias Hew. (= hermolaus Guen.) (12a). Apex of the forewing with large grey area; under surface of the hindwing between the veins with pale streaks, extending to the submarginal spots. Central Colombia to Bolivia, Orinoco, the Amazons and Goyaz. [In the lysithous group] The species of the lysithous group are characterised by red basal spots on the under surface of the wings. Haase rightly recognised these forms, so similar in appearance to the Aristolochia-Papilios, as belonging to the Kite-Papilios: all other authors have erroneously classified them with the Aristolochia- and Fluted-Papilios. The bright coloured larvae are striped longitudinally and bear a V-shaped saddle-spot before the middle; the thorax is spotted. The pupa is short; the abdomen enlarged in the middle. The species are found from Mexico to Argentina.

== Distribution ==
This species can be found in the Neotropical realm, in northern South America, Costa Rica, Trinidad and Tobago, Colombia, Venezuela, Bolivia, Suriname, Brazil, and Peru.

== Subspecies ==
- Mimoides pausanias pausanias (eastern Colombia to Bolivia, Peru, Surinam and Brazil: Amazonas and Pará)
- Mimoides pausanias cleombrotus (Strecker, 1885) (central Colombia)
- Mimoides pausanias hermolaus (Guenée, 1872) (Venezuela)
- Mimoides pausanias prasinus (Rothschild & Jordan, 1906) (Costa Rica)
- Mimoides pausanias tabaquita (Kaye, 1925) (Trinidad)

== Gallery ==
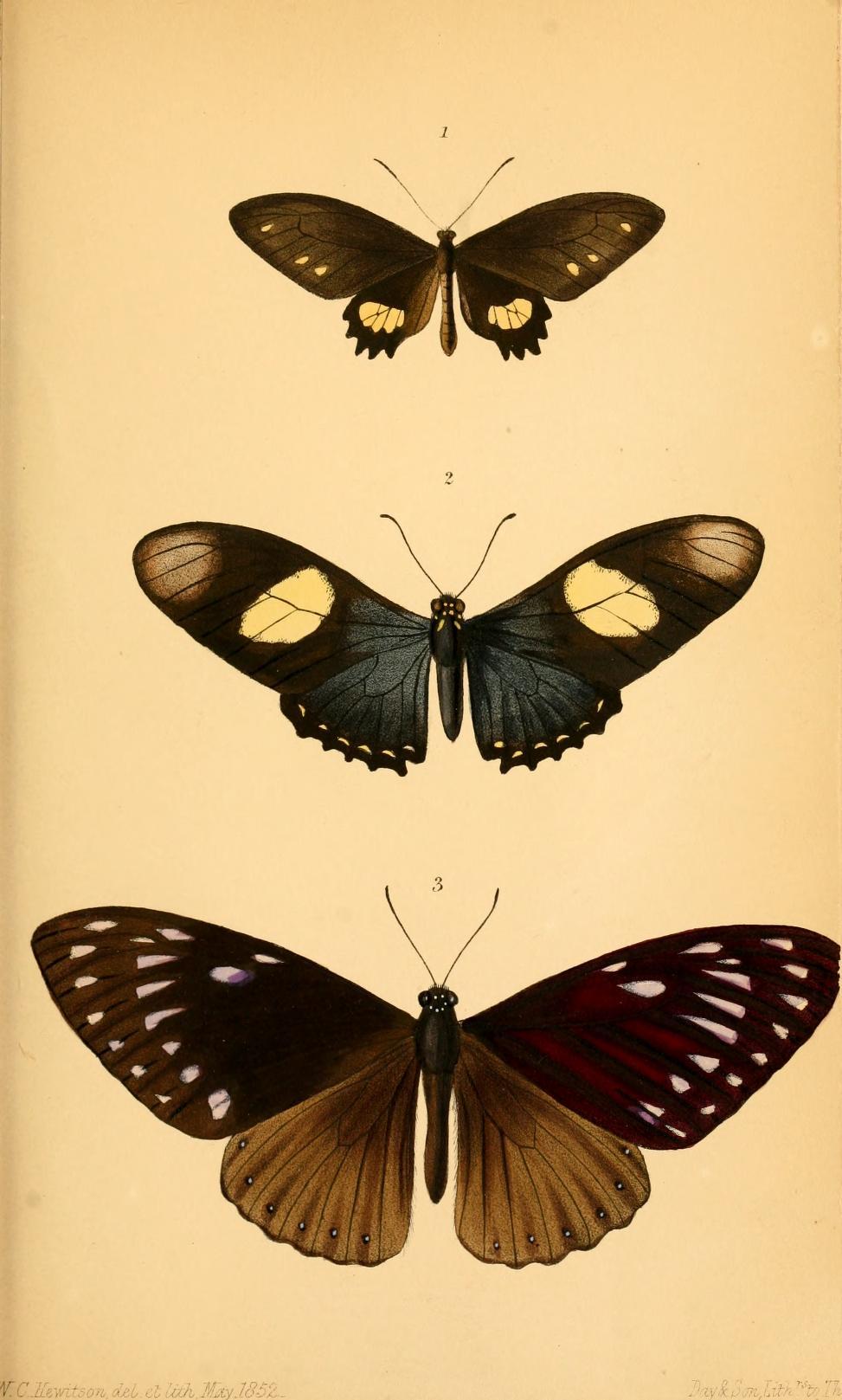
Plate 6 accompanying Hewitson's description in the Transactions of the Entomological Society of London for 1852. Mimoides pausanias is figure 2

Illustration from The Macrolepidoptera of the World Vol. 5
