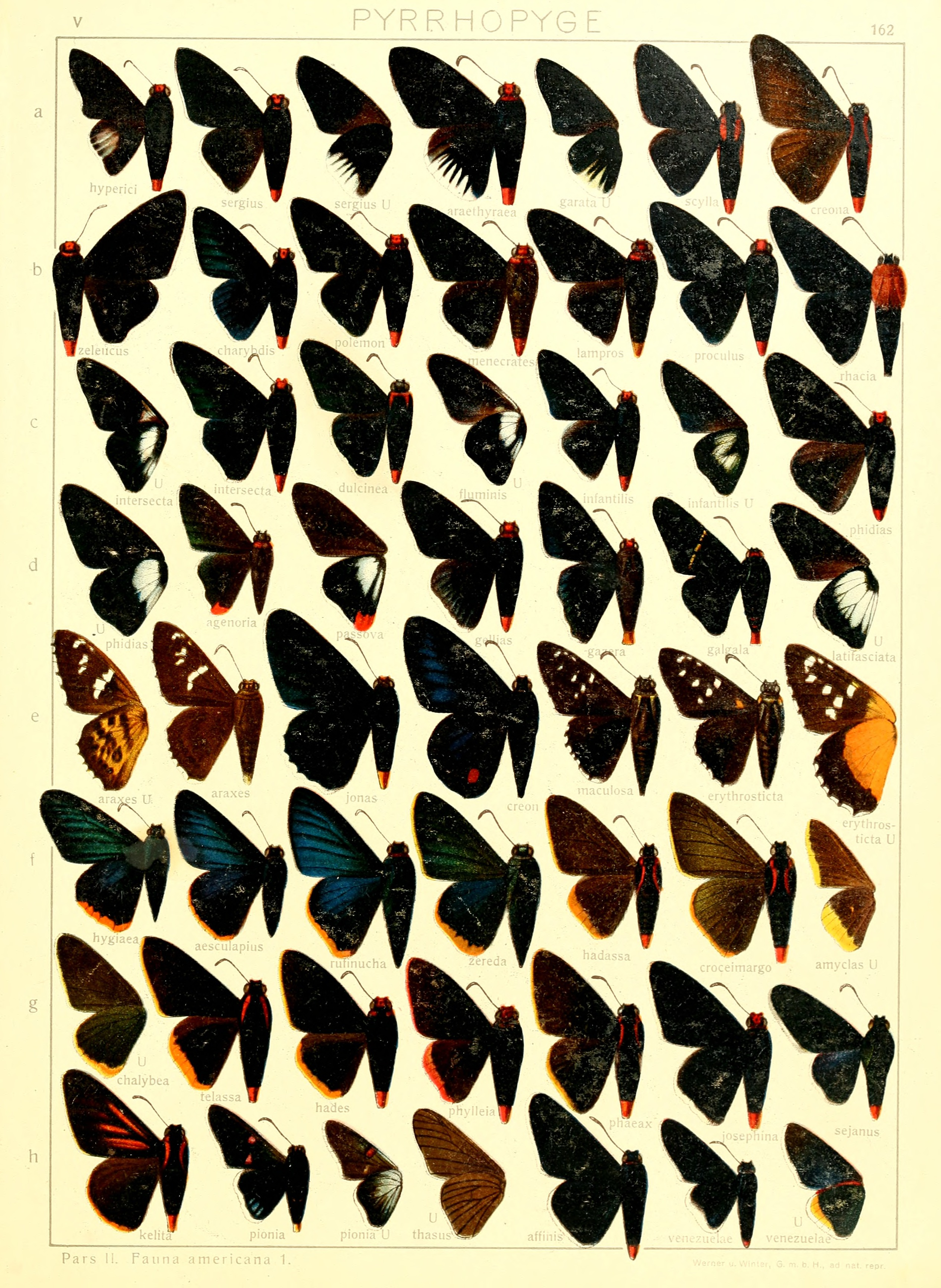
- Amenis pionia depicted in Adalbert Seitz's Macrolepidoptera of the World

Scientific classification
- Kingdom: Animalia
- Phylum: Arthropoda
- Class: Insecta
- Order: Lepidoptera
- Family: Hesperiidae
- Genus: Amenis; Watson, 1893

= Amenis =

Genus of butterflies

Amenis is a Neotropical genus of firetips in the family Hesperiidae. The genus is monotypic containing a single species, Amenis pionia (Hewitson, 1857).

== Subspecies ==
- Amenis pionia pionia Colombia, Venezuela
- Amenis pionia picia Evans, 1951 Colombia
- Amenis pionia ponina (Herrich-Schäffer, 1869) Panama, Venezuela
