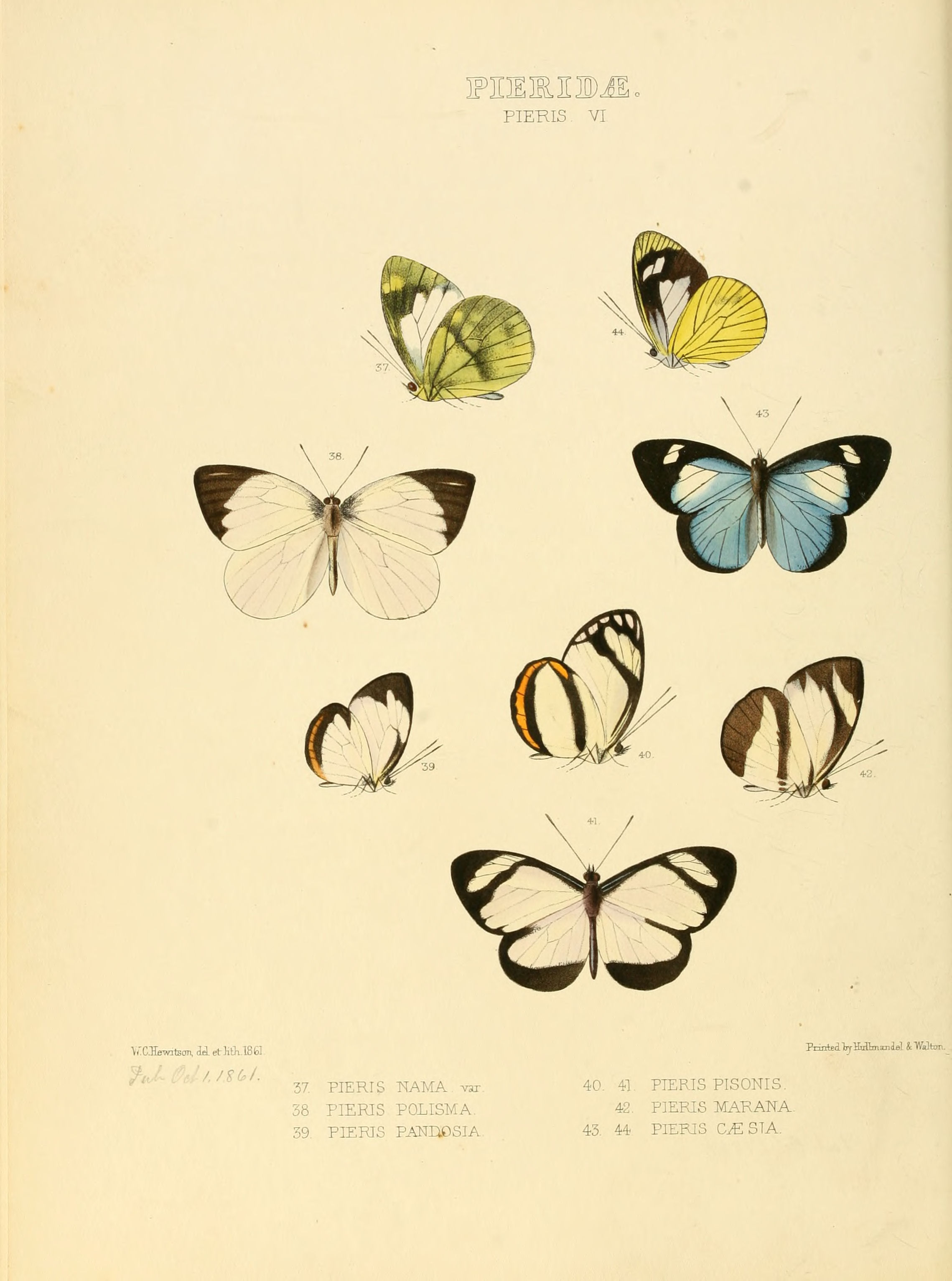

Scientific classification
- Kingdom: Animalia
- Phylum: Arthropoda
- Class: Insecta
- Order: Lepidoptera
- Family: Pieridae
- Genus: Leptophobia
- Species: L. caesia

Binomial name
- Leptophobia caesia (H. Lucas, 1852)

Synonyms
- Pieris caesia H. Lucas, 1852; Leptophobia caesia f. pasarga Fruhstorfer, 1907; Leptophobia tenuicornis Butler & H. Druce, 1872

= Leptophobia caesia =

Bluish white

Species of butterfly

Leptophobia caesia, the bluish white, is a butterfly in the family Pieridae. The species was first described by Hippolyte Lucas in 1852. It is found from Mexico to Ecuador. This butterfly inhabits various environments, including tropical and subtropical forests, and is often seen near rivers and streams. Leptophobia caesia is known for its delicate, pale blue to white wings, which provide effective camouflage against predators. Its presence contributes to the biodiversity of the regions it inhabits, and it plays a role in pollination, thus supporting the local ecosystems.

The larvae feed on Podandrogyne pulcherrima flowering plants.

== Subspecies ==
The following subspecies are recognised:

- Leptophobia caesia caesia (Ecuador)
- Leptophobia caesia tenuicornis Butler & H. Druce, 1872 (Costa Rica, Panama)
- Leptophobia caesia phanokia Fruhstorfer, 1907 (Colombia)
