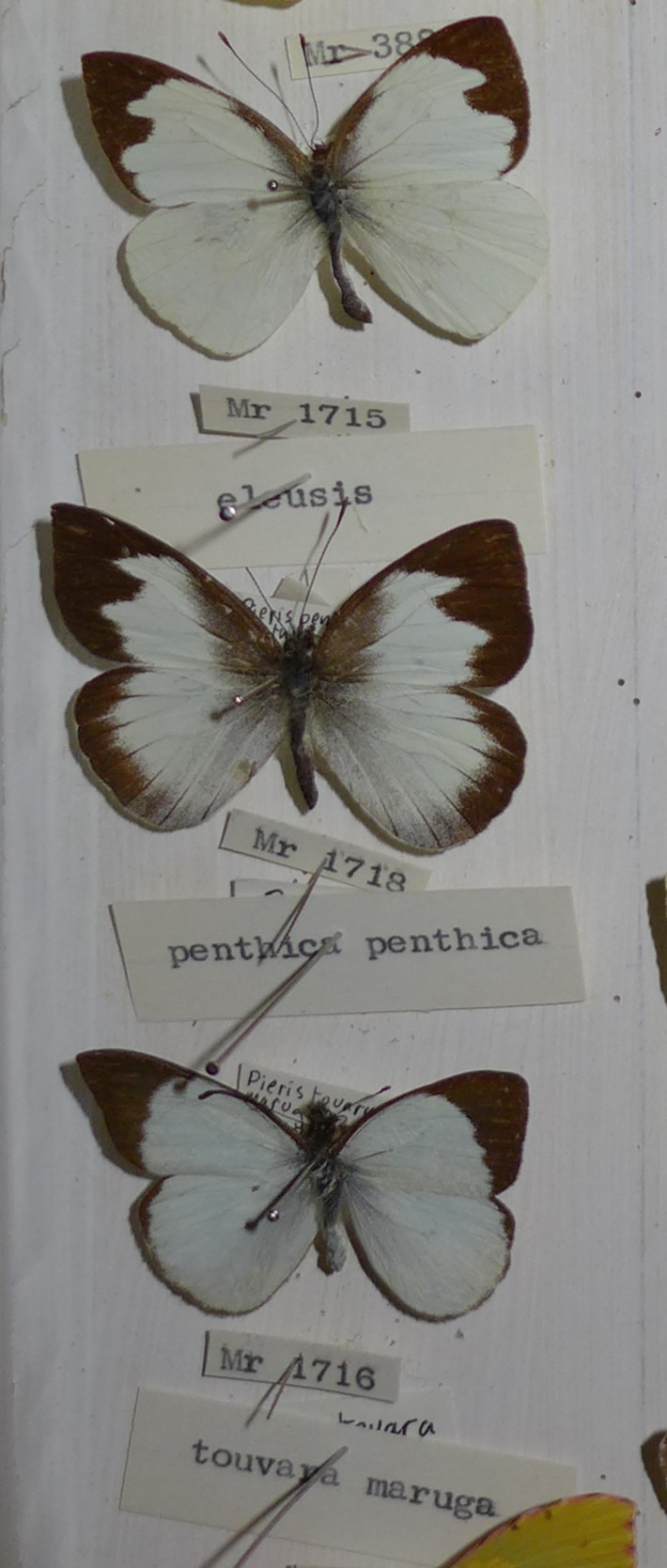

Scientific classification
- Kingdom: Animalia
- Phylum: Arthropoda
- Class: Insecta
- Order: Lepidoptera
- Family: Pieridae
- Genus: Leptophobia
- Species: L. penthica

Binomial name
- Leptophobia penthica (Kollar, 1850)

Synonyms
- Leptalis penthica Kollar, 1850; Pieris euthemia C. Felder & R. Felder, 1861; Leptophobia euthemia

= Leptophobia penthica =

Species of butterfly

Leptophobia penthica, the penthica white, is a butterfly in the family Pieridae. It is found in Colombia, Bolivia and Venezuela.

The wingspan is 44–48 mm (1.7–1.9 in). Adults have black markings on the upperside.

== Subspecies ==
The following subspecies are recognised:

- Leptophobia penthica penthica (Colombia)
- Leptophobia penthica stamnata (Lucas, 1852) (Venezuela)
- Leptophobia penthica semicaesia (C. & R. Felder, 1865) (Colombia)
- Leptophobia penthica basiliola Fruhstorfer, 1908 (Bolivia)
