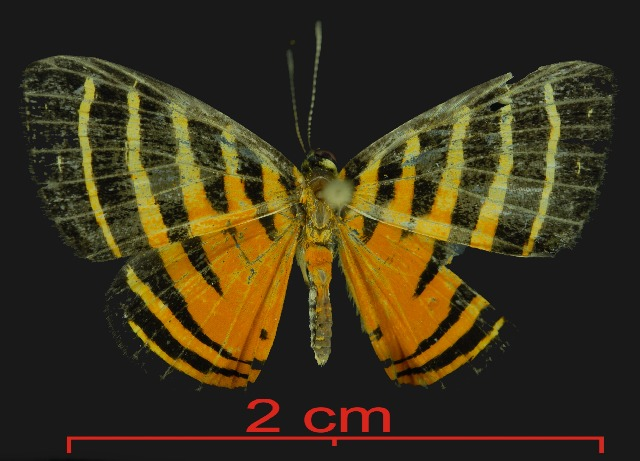
- Male (upperside)
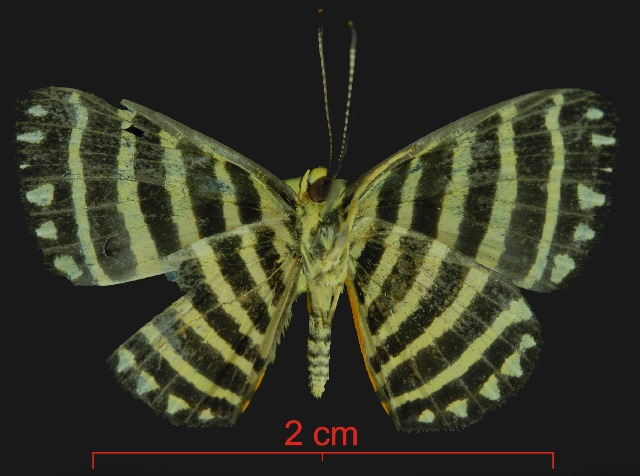
- Underside

Scientific classification
- Kingdom: Animalia
- Phylum: Arthropoda
- Clade: Pancrustacea
- Class: Insecta
- Order: Lepidoptera
- Family: Riodinidae
- Genus: Hyphilaria
- Species: H. parthenis

Binomial name
- Hyphilaria parthenis (Westwood, 1851)

Synonyms
- Baeotis parthenis Westwood, 1851; Baeotis parthenis Doubleday, 1847 (nom. nud.); Baeotis cydias Doubleday, 1847 (nom. nud.); Baeotis cydias Westwood, 1851; Baeotis barissus Hewitson, 1875; Hyphilaria parthenis tigrinella Stichel, 1909; Hyphilaria parthenis virgatula Stichel, 1909

= Hyphilaria parthenis =

Species of butterfly

Hyphilaria parthenis is a butterfly of the family Riodinidae. It is found in low altitude areas of the Neotropical realm, from Panama to southern Brazil.

The wingspan is about 25 mm.
