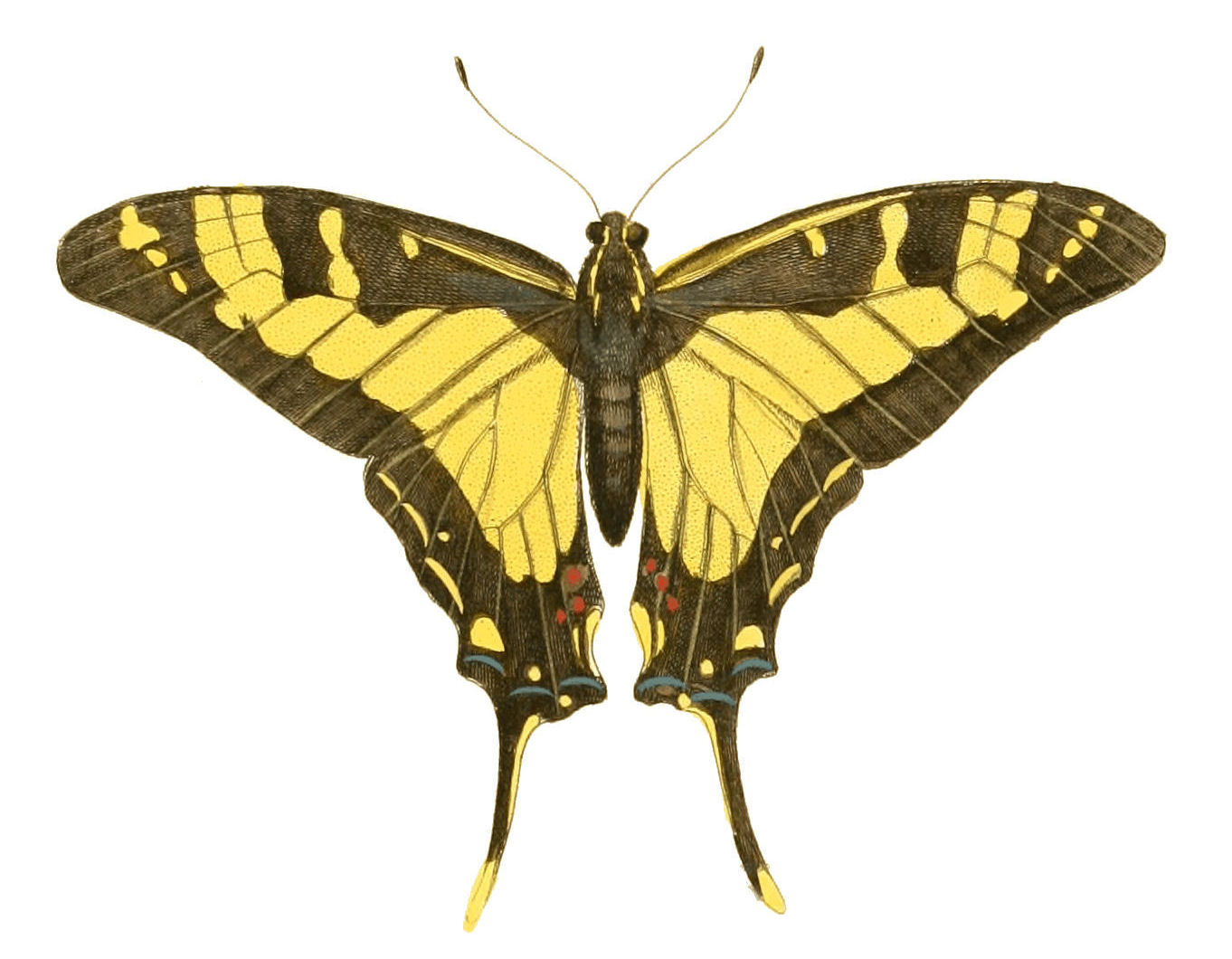
- Illustration by Dru Drury

Scientific classification
- Kingdom: Animalia
- Phylum: Arthropoda
- Class: Insecta
- Order: Lepidoptera
- Family: Papilionidae
- Genus: Eurytides
- Species: E. thyastes

Binomial name
- Eurytides thyastes (Drury, 1782)

Synonyms
- List: Papilio thyastes Drury, 1782; Iphiclides diaphorus Hübner, [1821]; Papilio marchandii Boisduval, 1836; Papilio thyastinus Oberthür, 1879; Papilio thyastes zoros Rothschild & Jordan, 1906; Papilio marchandi var. panamensis Oberthür, 1879; Protographium_thyastes (Drury, 1782); Eurytides occidentalis Maza, 1982

= Eurytides thyastes =

Species of butterfly

Eurytides thyastes is a species of butterfly found in the Neotropical realm.

== Subspecies ==
- E. t. thyastes Mato Grosso - Rio de Janeiro, São Paulo, Paraná, Santa Catarina, Rio Grande do Sul (southeastern Brazil) northeast Paraguay
- E. t. marchandii Boisduval, 1836 Puebla, Veracruz, Tabasco, Oaxaca, Chiapas (eastern Mexico), Belize, Guatemala, Honduras
- E. t. thyastinus (Oberthür, 1879) east of the Andes (southeast Ecuador, southeast Colombia), Peru, north Bolivia, Amazonas
- E. t. panamensis (Oberthür, 1879) Costa Rica, west Colombia, northwest Ecuador, Panama.
- E. t. occidentalis Maza, 1982 southwest Mexico (Guerrero, El Faisanal, Nueva Delhi)

== Description ==
Forewing with complete or interrupted yellow discal band and hindwing with large yellow discal area: underside of the hindwing with red discal line. Ecuador to Bolivia; Brazil.

thyastinus Oberthur. The submarginal spots between the 2. and 3. radial of the forewing separated by a corresponding discal spot, discal band usually interrupted at the 3. radial, the 1. submarginal spot is absent or small. Eastern slopes of the Andes from North Ecuador to Central Peru, Upper Amazon.

zoros R. & J. [synonym of thyastinus] Like the preceding; the 1. submarginal spot of the forewing sharply- defined; the discal spot between 2. radial and 1. median usually truncate distally, the upper angle not rounded. South-East Peru and Bolivia.

thyastes Drury (= diaphorus Hbn.) Paler yellow than the Andes forms; discal band of the forewing not interrupted, or only very slightly, the submarginal spot between the 2. and 3. radials quite close to the discal spot or partly merged with it; the black discal area of the hindwing not entering the cell. Southern Brazil, only known from São Paulo to Rio Grande do Sul.

== Status ==
Not uncommon and not threatened.
