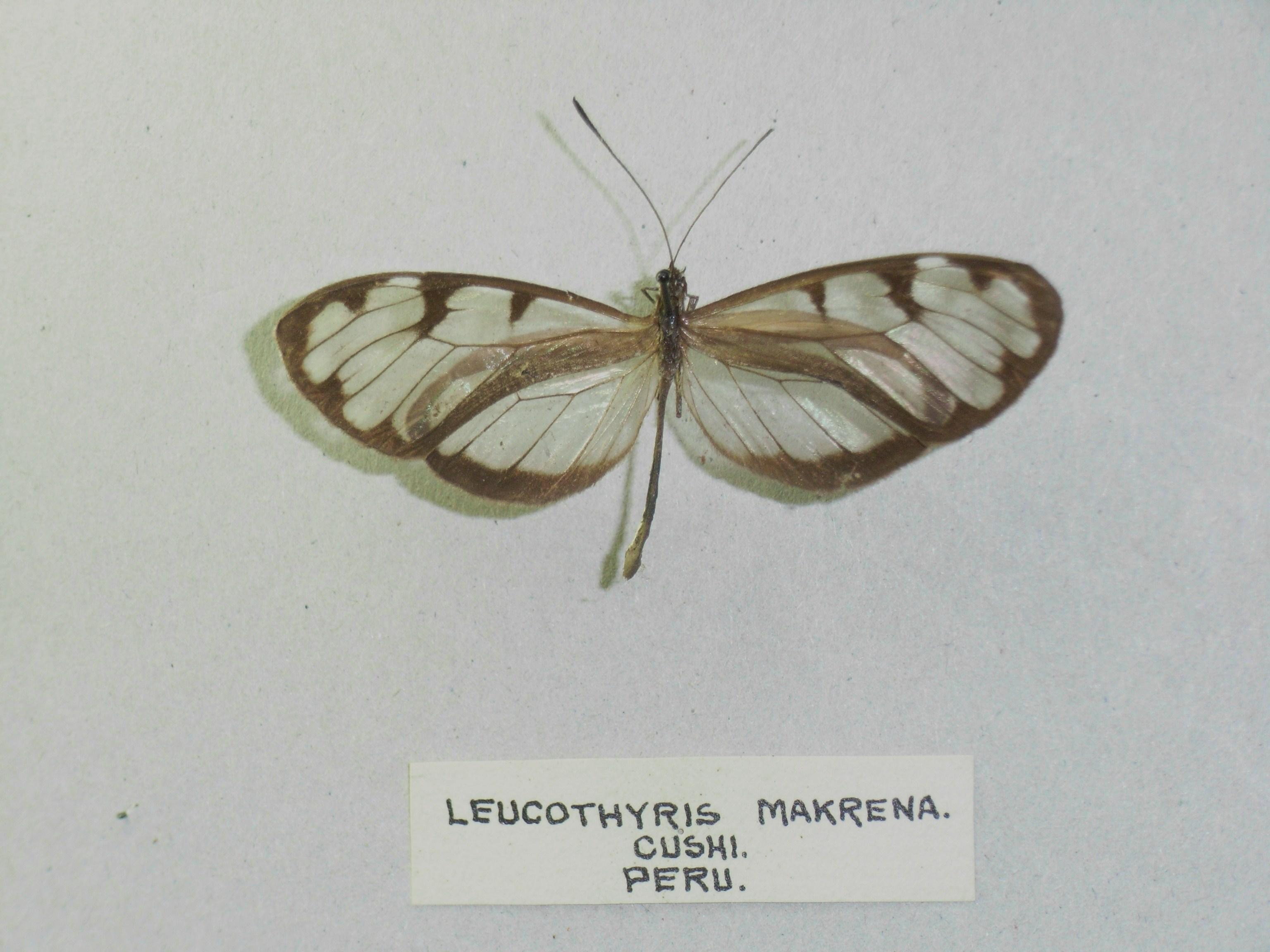

Scientific classification
- Kingdom: Animalia
- Phylum: Arthropoda
- Class: Insecta
- Order: Lepidoptera
- Family: Nymphalidae
- Genus: Oleria
- Species: O. makrena

Binomial name
- Oleria makrena (Hewitson, [1854])

Synonyms
- Ithomia makrena Hewitson, [1854]; Leucothyris makrena (Hewitson, [1854])

= Oleria makrena =

Species of butterfly

Oleria makrena, the makrena clearwing, is a butterfly of the family Nymphalidae. It is found in Venezuela, Ecuador, Colombia, Bolivia, Peru, Panama and Costa Rica.

The wingspan is about 52 mm.

== Subspecies ==
- Oleria makrena makrena (Venezuela, Ecuador)
- Oleria makrena caucana (Colombia)
- Oleria makrena schoenfelderi (Bolivia)

There are three undescribed subspecies. Two from Colombia and one from Panama.
