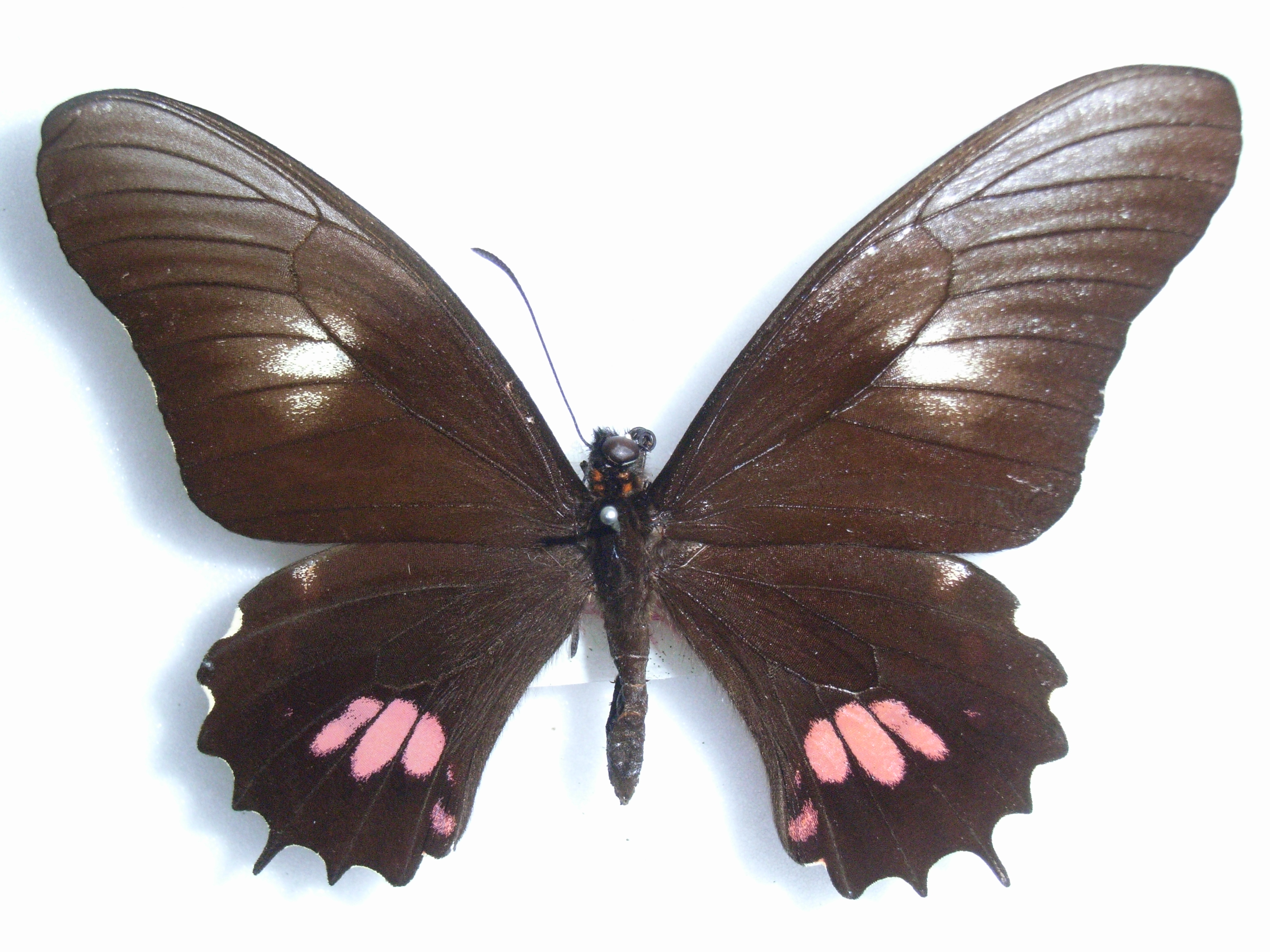

Scientific classification
- Kingdom: Animalia
- Phylum: Arthropoda
- Clade: Pancrustacea
- Class: Insecta
- Order: Lepidoptera
- Family: Papilionidae
- Genus: Papilio
- Species: P. isidorus

Binomial name
- Papilio isidorus Doubleday, 1846

Synonyms
- Heraclides isidorus; Papilio rhodostictus Butler & H. Druce, 1874; Heraclides rhodostictus; Papilio ceus Dognin, 1887

= Papilio isidorus =

Species of butterfly

Papilio isidorus is a butterfly of the family Papilionidae (swallowtails). The species was first described by Henry Doubleday in 1846. It is found in Central and South America.

== Description ==
Forewing on the under surface either without white cell spot, or the spot small, not extending transversely across the cell. Hindwing posteriorly shorter than in P. chiansiades, the tail short, narrow: the last submarginal spot more distal than the large spot placed before it. The harpe of the male not dentate.

The wingspan is about 80 mm.

The larvae feed on Citrus and Zanthoxylum species.

== Subspecies ==
- Papilio isidorus isidorus (Bolivia, Peru) The white patch on the under surface of the forewing usually enters the cell and is often also indicated above; the red spots of the hindwing on the whole larger than in red-spotted specimens of P. i. flavescens, the two spots placed between the 2. radial and 2. median separated also on the upper surface - forma P. i. chironis R. and J forewing above with two white spots between the 2. radial and 2. median and a small cell spot; the spots beneath much larger, the spot between the 8. radial and 1. median the largest.
- Papilio isidorus rhodostictus Butler & H. Druce, 1874 (Costa Rica, Panama)
- Papilio isidorus flavescens Oberthür, 1879 (Colombia, Ecuador) The white spots on the underside of the forewing reduced. The spot between the 2. and H. radial of the hindwing usually white above or beneath or on both sides.
- Papilio isidorus brises Rothschild & Jordan, 1906 (Colombia) Forewing above without spots, beneath with two or three spots, but without cell spot.
- Papilio isidorus nymphius Rothschild & Jordan, 1906 (Colombia)
- Papilio isidorus pacificus Rothschild & Jordan, 1906 (Colombia, western Ecuador)
- Papilio isidorus autana (Racheli & Racheli, 1995) (Venezuela)
- Papilio isidorus tingo (Racheli & Racheli, 1995) (Peru)

== Taxonomy ==
Papilio hyppason is a member of the anchisiades species group
