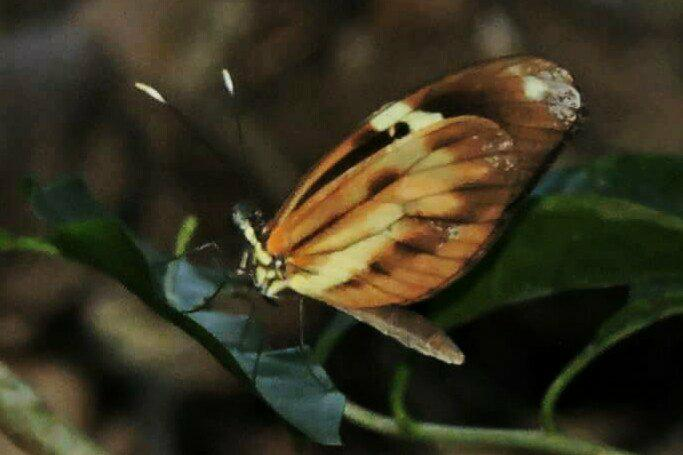

Scientific classification
- Kingdom: Animalia
- Phylum: Arthropoda
- Clade: Pancrustacea
- Class: Insecta
- Order: Lepidoptera
- Family: Pieridae
- Genus: Dismorphia
- Species: D. amphione

Binomial name
- Dismorphia amphione (Cramer, [1779])

Synonyms
- List: Papilio amphione Cramer, [1779]; Papilio amphiona Cramer, [1779]; Papilio astynome Dalman, 1823; Dismorphia polymela Geyer, 1832; Dismorphia astynome paulistana Fruhstorfer, 1912; Dismorphia astynome cellularis Martin, [1923]; Dismorphia astynome chloronome Avinoff, 1926; Leptalis praxinoe Doubleday, 1844; Leptalis amphithea C. & R. Felder, [1865]; Dismorphia arsinoides Staudinger, 1884; Leptalis arsinoe C. & R. Felder, 1865; Dismorphia discrepans Butler, 1896; Dismorphia rhomboidea Butler, 1896; Dismorphia broomeae Butler, 1899; Dismorphia amphione astynomides Röber, 1909; Dismorphia robinsoni Schaus, 1929

= Dismorphia amphione =

Tiger mimic white

Species of butterfly

Dismorphia amphione, the tiger mimic white, is a species of butterfly of the family Pieridae. It is found from Mexico and the Caribbean down to Brazil and Bolivia.

The wingspan is about 77 mm. It is an extremely variable species.

The larvae feed on Inga species, including I. sapindoides and I. densiflora.

Dismorphia amphione mimics the ithomiine butterflies of the genus Mechanitis (M. lysimnia, M. polymnia, M. mazaeus, M. menapis) in colour pattern and in the slow regular flight.

== Subspecies ==
- D. a. amphione (Suriname)
- D. a. astynome (Dalman, 1823) (Brazil (São Paulo, Bahia, Minas Gerais), Argentina)
- D. a. praxinoe (Doubleday, 1844) (Mexico, from Panama to Colombia)
- D. a. beroe (Lucas, 1852) (Colombia)
- D. a. egaena (Bates, 1861) (Brazil (Amazonas))
- D. a. discrepans Butler, 1896 (Ecuador)
- D. a. rhomboidea Butler, 1896 (Ecuador, Peru)
- D. a. broomeae Butler, 1899 (Venezuela, Trinidad)
- D. a. meridionalis Röber, 1909 (Bolivia)
- D. a. daguana Bargmann, 1929 (Colombia, Ecuador)
- D. a. lupita Lamas, 1979 (Mexico)
- D. a. isolda Llorente, 1984 (Mexico)
- D. a. bertha Lamas, 2004 (Peru)
- D. a. mora Lamas, 2004 (Peru)

== Gallery ==
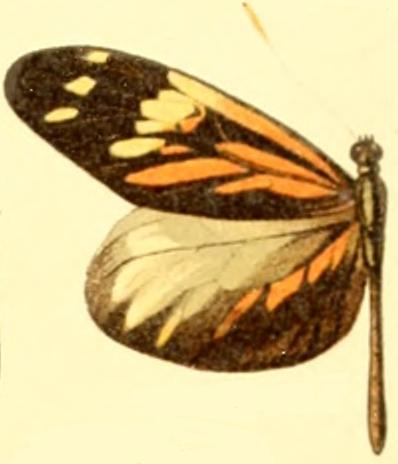
D. a. amphione male

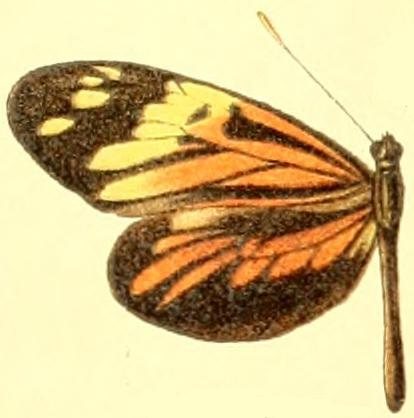
D. a. amphione female

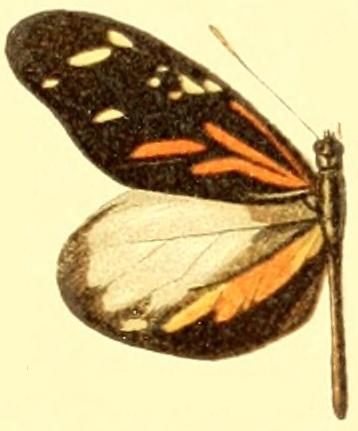
D. a. discrepans male

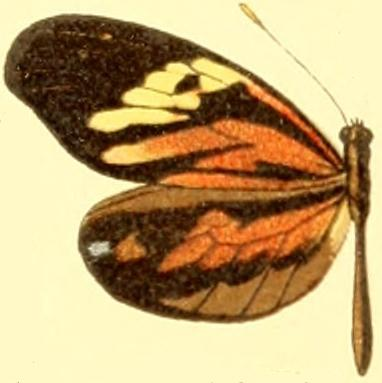
D. a. discrepans female

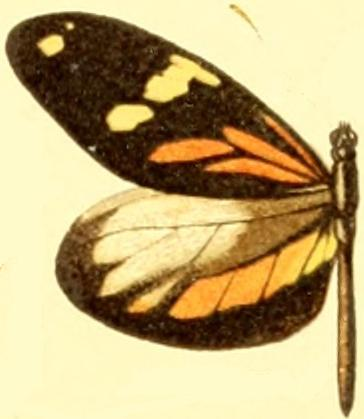
D. a. astynome male

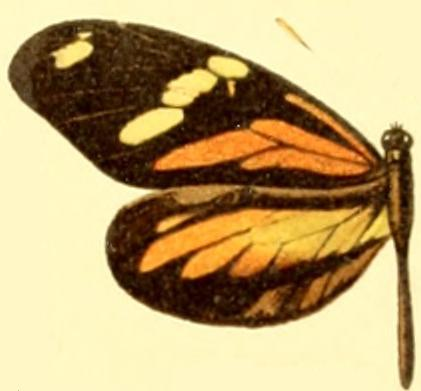
D. a. astynome female

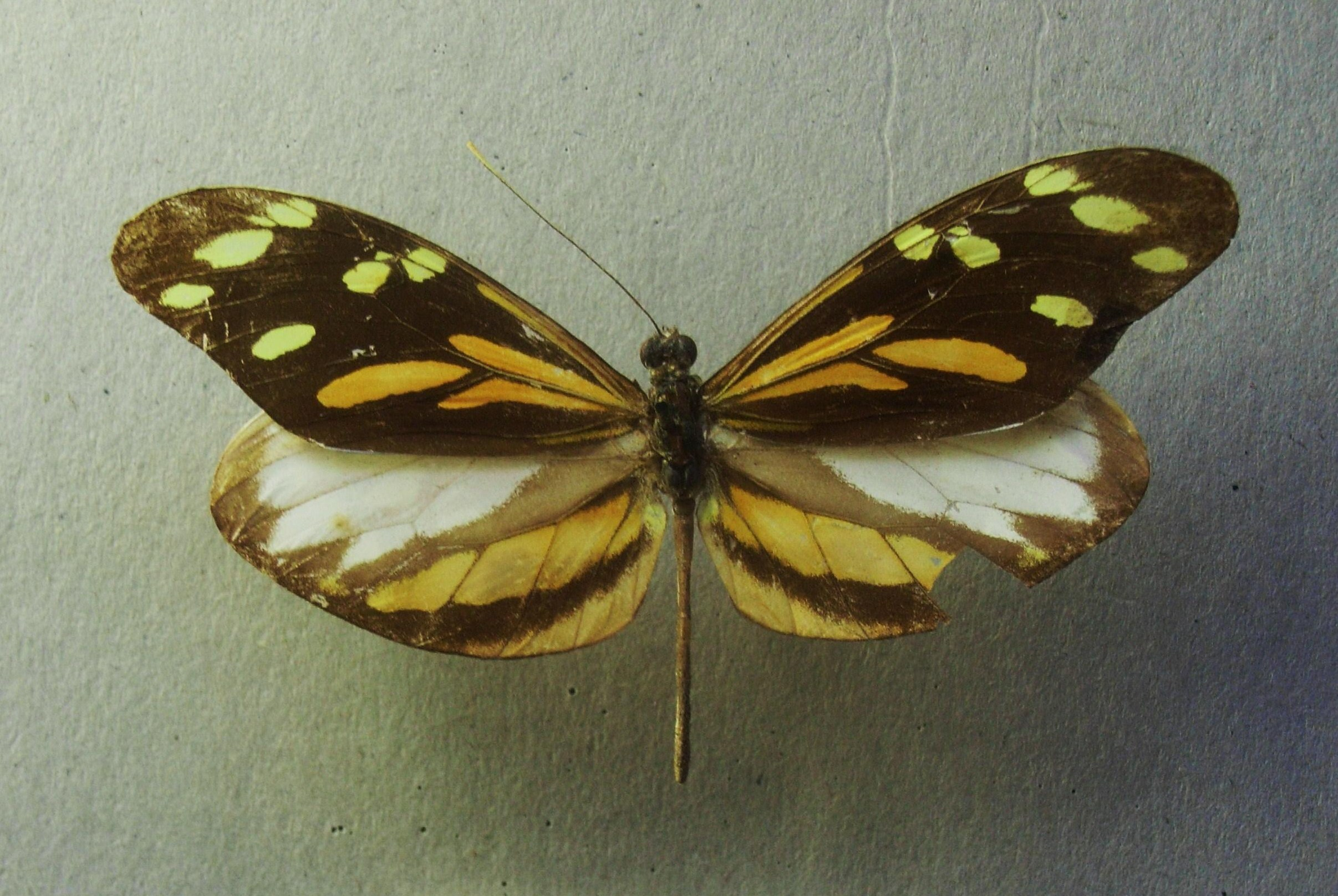
D. a. praxinoe male

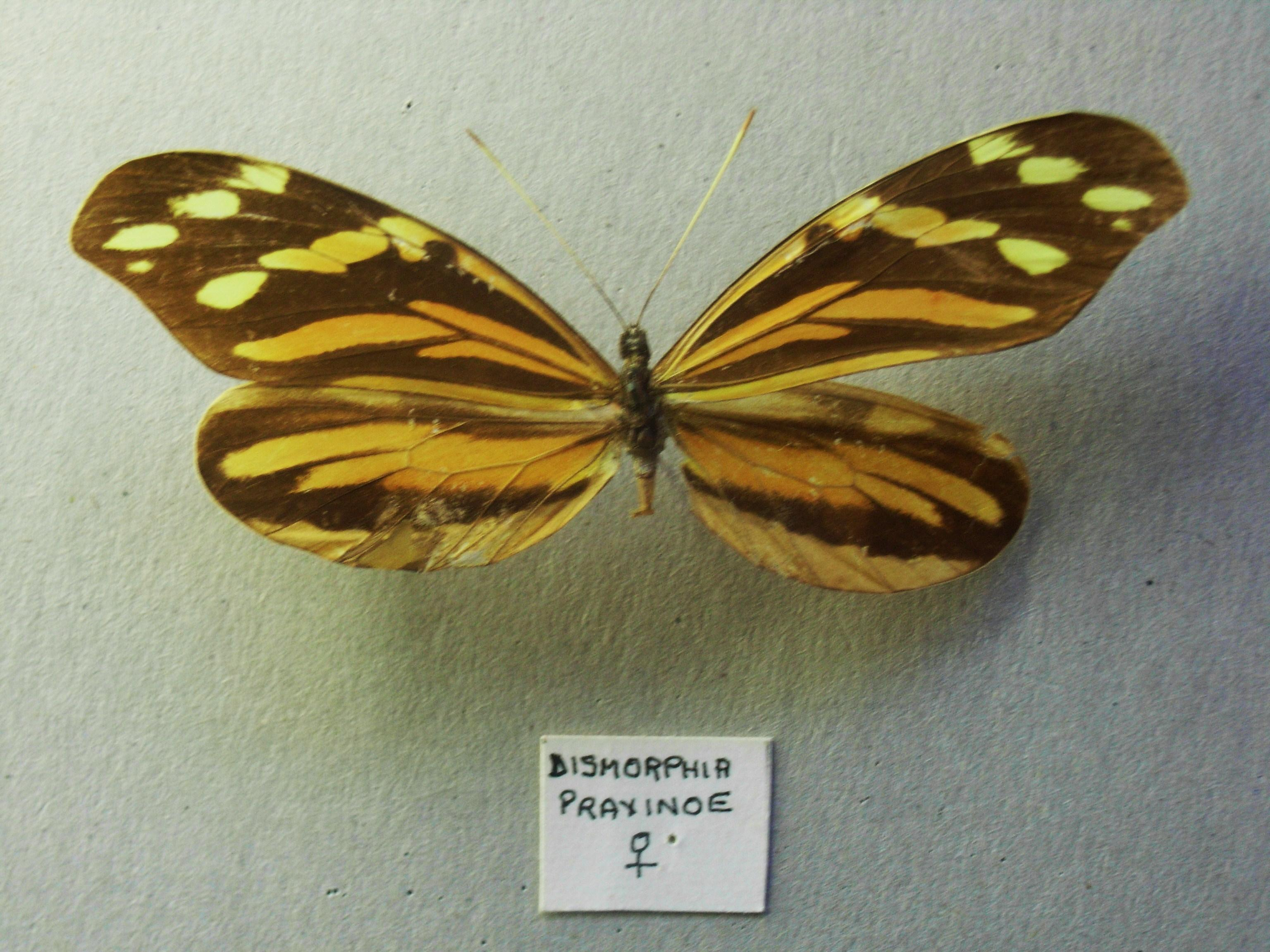
D. a. praxinoe female
