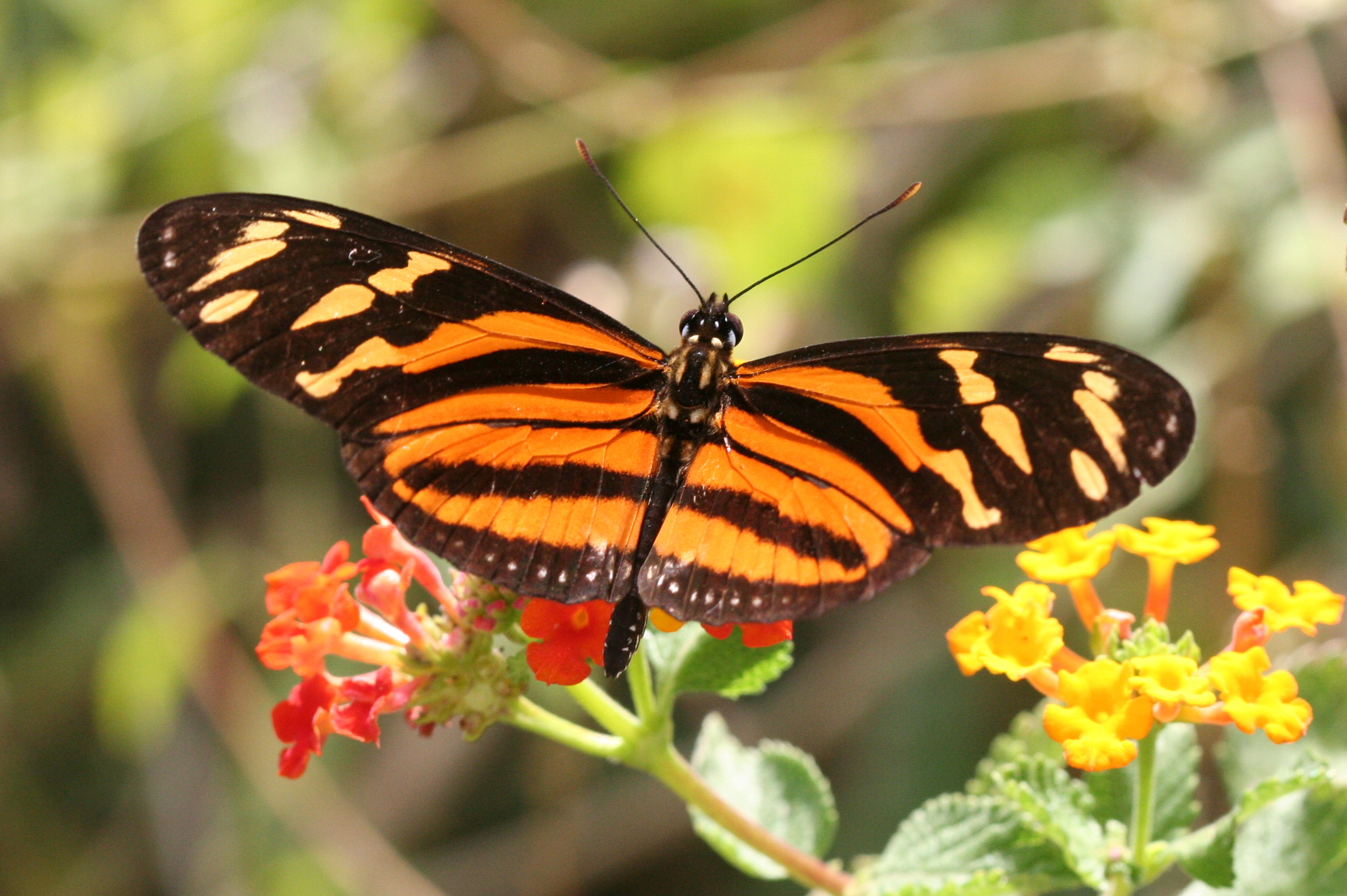
- Dorsal view

Scientific classification
- Domain: Eukaryota
- Kingdom: Animalia
- Phylum: Arthropoda
- Class: Insecta
- Order: Lepidoptera
- Family: Nymphalidae
- Genus: Eueides
- Species: E. isabella

Binomial name
- Eueides isabella (Stoll, 1781)

Synonyms
- List: Papilio isabella Stoll, [1781]; Nereis dianasa Hübner, [1806]; Papilio eva Fabricius, 1793; Eueides anaxa Ménétriés, 1855; Eueides zorcaon Reakirt, 1866; Eueides cleobaea zorcaon ab. adusta Stichel, 1903; Eueides dianasa ab. decolorata Stichel, 1903; Eueides cleobaea var. monochroma Boullet & Le Cerf, 1910; Eueides pellucida Srnka, 1885; Eueides isabella seitzi Stichel, 1903; Eueides hippolinus Butler, 1873; Eueides isabella hippolinus ab. personata Stichel, 1903; Eueides isabella hippolinus ab. brunnea Stichel, 1903; Eueides imitans Seitz, 1912; Eueides isabella hübneri ab. spoliata Stichel, 1903; Eueides isabella isabella f. perimacula Boullet & Le Cerf, 1910; Eueides isabella hippolinus ab. margaritifera Stichel, 1903; Eueides isabella pellucida ab. vegetissima Stichel, 1903; Eueides isabella hübneri var. olga Neustetter, 1916

= Eueides isabella =

Isabella's longwing

Species of butterfly

Eueides isabella, the Isabella's longwing or Isabella's heliconian, is a species of nymphalid butterfly, belonging to the Heliconiinae subfamily.

== Description ==
Eueides isabella is a large butterfly with a wingspan of 65–90 millimetres (2.6–3.5 in). The uppersides of the wings is dark brown, with orange bands and yellowish markings on the edges of the forewings. The undersides of the wings are quite similar to the uppersides, but the edges of the hindwings show a series of small blue spots.

The flight period extends to the whole year in the tropical habitat. They are active even in low light. Caterpillars are white and black covered by long black spines. They are gregarious and they primarily feed on Passiflora platyloba and Passiflora ambigua.

== Distribution ==
This species can be found from Mexico to the Amazon basin and the West Indies.

== Habitat ==
Eueides isabella lives in the rainforest where it remains in the canopy. It can be found from sea level to about 1500 m above sea level.

== Subspecies ==
- E. i. isabella (French Guiana, Suriname, Trinidad)
- E. i. arquata Stichel, 1903 (Colombia)
- E. i. cleobaea Geyer, 1832 (Cuba, Puerto Rico, Central America)
- E. i. dianasa (Hübner, [1806])
- E. i. dissoluta Stichel, 1903 (Peru, Ecuador)
- E. i. dynastes C. et R. Felder, 1861 (Venezuela, Colombia)
- E. i. ecuadorensis Strand, 1909 (Ecuador)
- E. i. eva (Fabricius, 1793) (Mexico, Honduras, Nicaragua, Panama)
- E. i. hippolinus Butler, 1873 (Peru)
- E. i. huebneri Ménétriés, 1857 (Colombia)
- E. i. melphis (Godart, 1819) (Haiti, Antilles)
- E. i. nigricornis Maza, 1982 (Brazil)
- E. i. subspecies (Brazil)

== Similar species ==
- Heliconius ismenius – tiger heliconian
- Lycorea halia – tiger mimic-queen
- Eresia phyillyra – tiger heliconian
- Mechanitis lysimnia – confused tigerwing
- Mechanitis menapis – variable tigerwing
- Mechanitis polymnia – disturbed tigerwing
- Hypothyris lycaste – round-spotted ticlear
- Hypothyris euclea – common ticlear
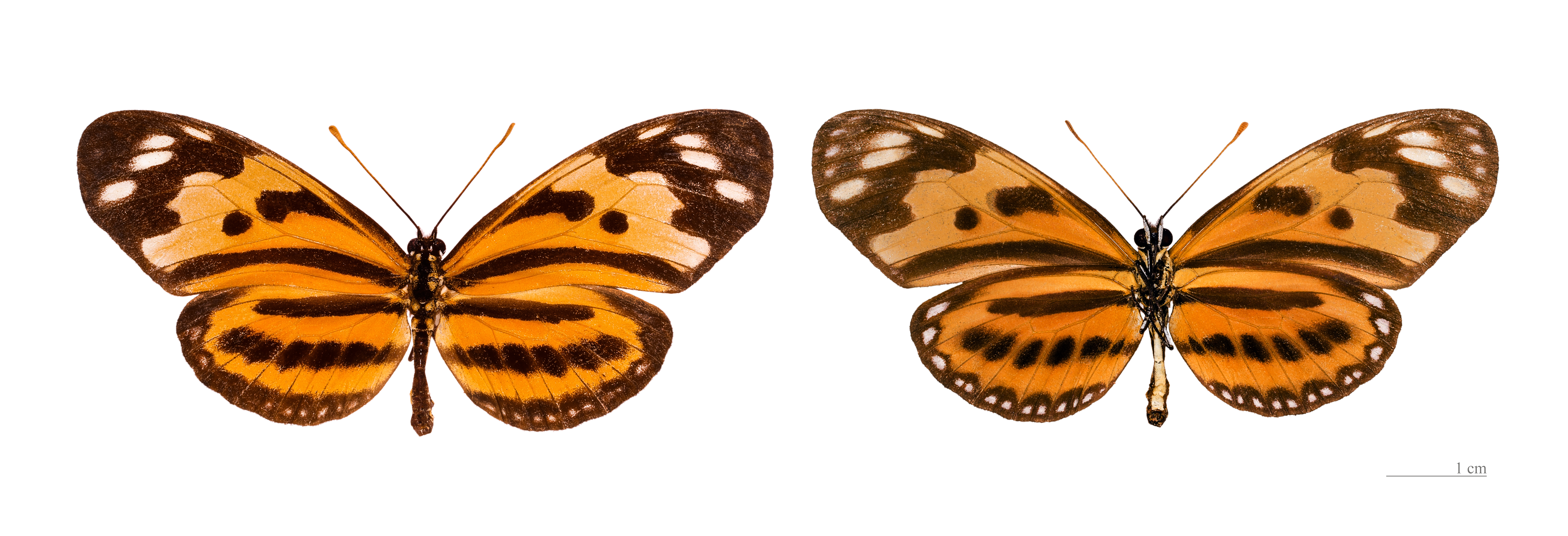
E. i. isabella - MHNT
