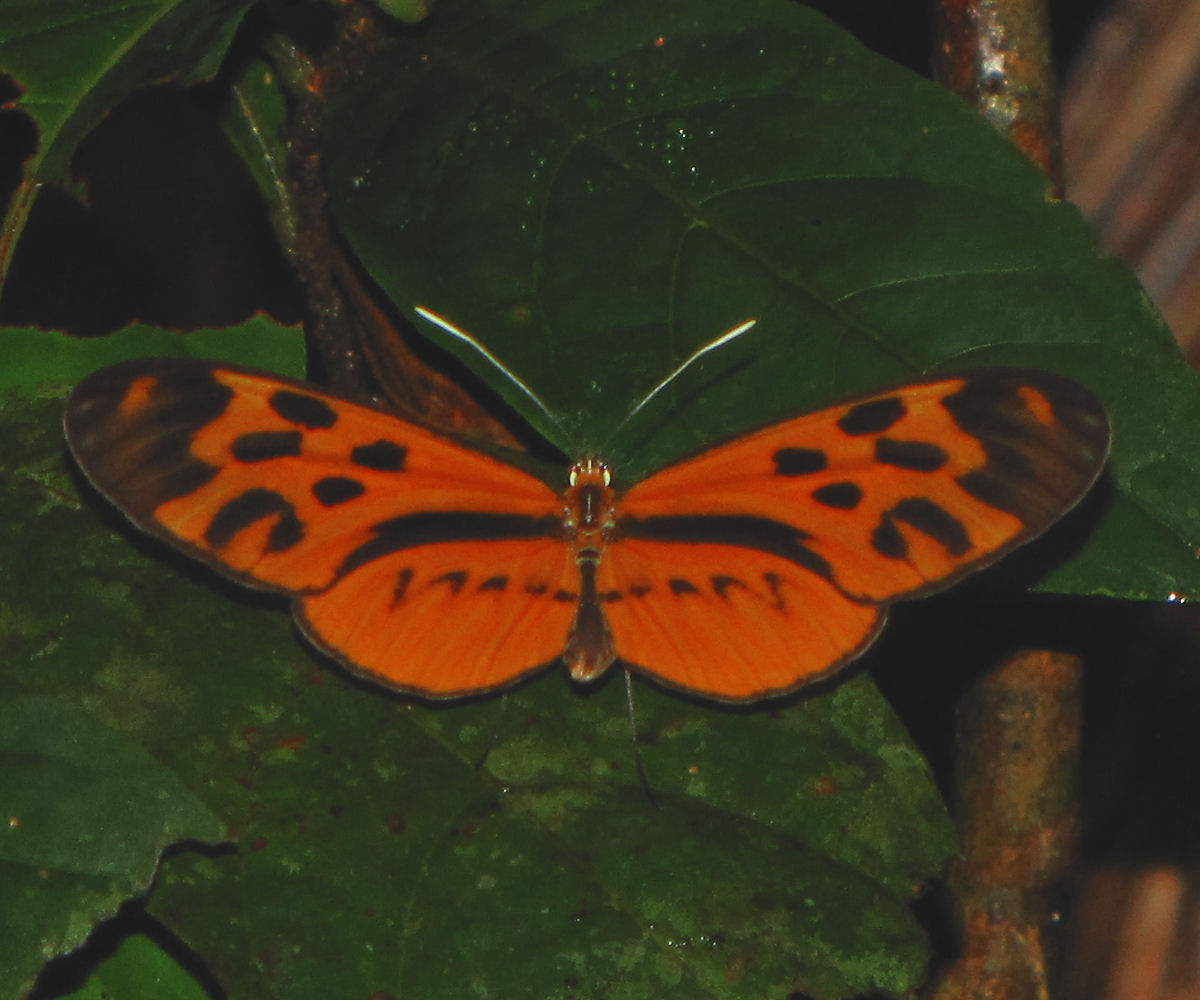

Scientific classification
- Domain: Eukaryota
- Kingdom: Animalia
- Phylum: Arthropoda
- Class: Insecta
- Order: Lepidoptera
- Family: Nymphalidae
- Genus: Melinaea
- Species: M. menophilus

Binomial name
- Melinaea menophilus (Hewitson, 1856)

Synonyms
- Melinaea menophilus (Hewitson, [1856]); Mechanitis menophilus Hewitson, [1856]; Melinaea ishka Butler, 1870; Melinaea menophilus membrosa Forbes, 1927; Melinaea zaneka Butler, 1870; Melinaea chincha Druce, 1876; Melinaea egesta Godman & Salvin, 1898; Melinaea magnifica Haensch, 1905

= Melinaea menophilus =

Hewitson's tiger

Species of butterfly

Melinaea menophilus, the Hewitson's tiger or Hewitson's tiger-wing, is a species of butterfly of the family Nymphalidae. It is found throughout the Amazonian region.

The wingspan is 70–80 mm.

== Subspecies ==
- Melinaea menophilus cocana Haensch, 1903 (Ecuador)
- Melinaea menophilus ernestoi Brown, 1977 (Colombia)
- Melinaea menophilus hicetas Godman & Salvin, 1879 (Colombia, Peru)
- Melinaea menophilus maenius (Hewitson, 1860) (Brazil (Amazonas))
- Melinaea menophilus mediatrix Weymer, 1891 (Guianas, northern Brazil)
- Melinaea menophilus menophilus (Colombia)
- Melinaea menophilus orestes Salvin, 1871 (Peru)
- Melinaea menophilus zaneka Butler, 1870 (Ecuador)
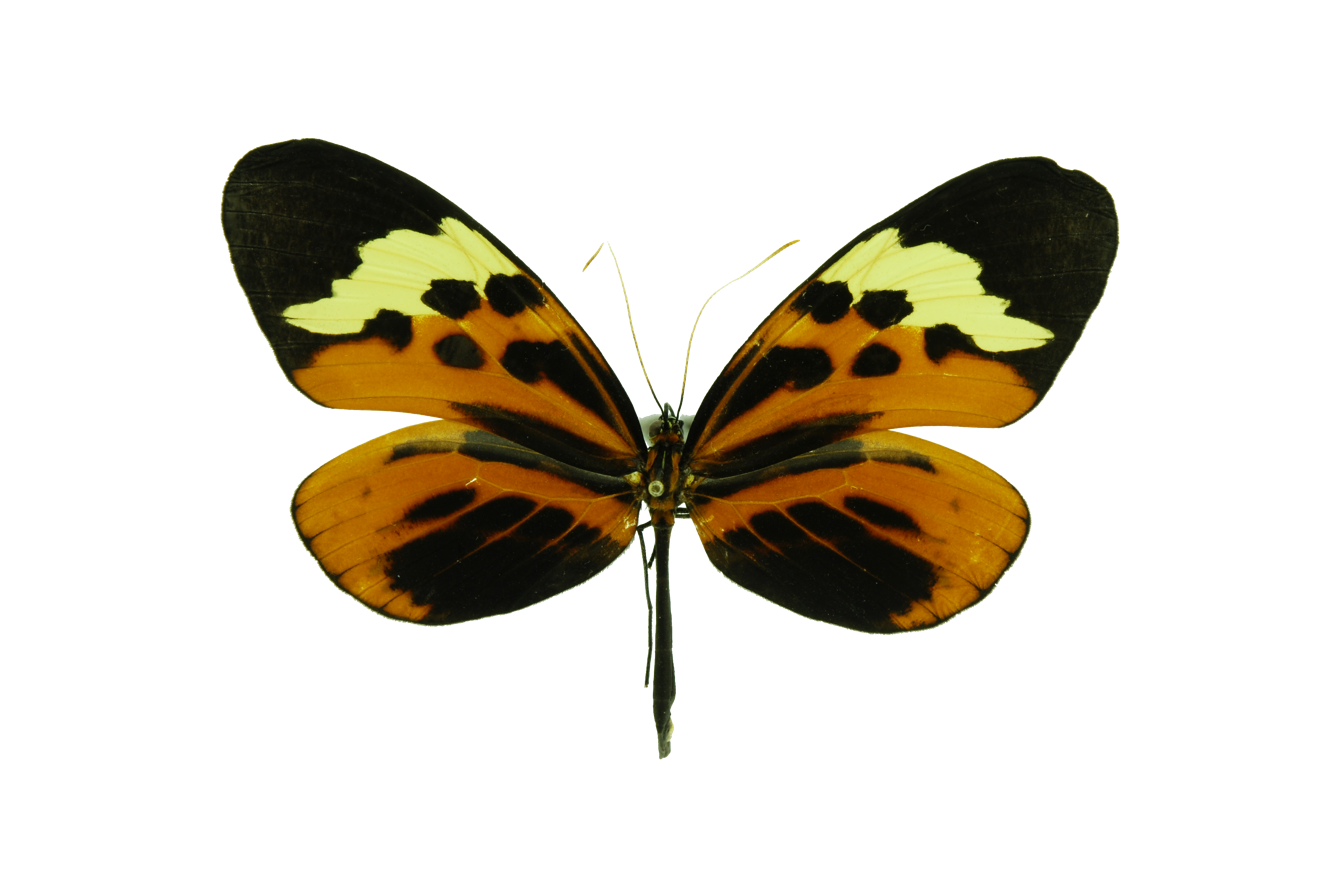
Dorsal, Ecuador

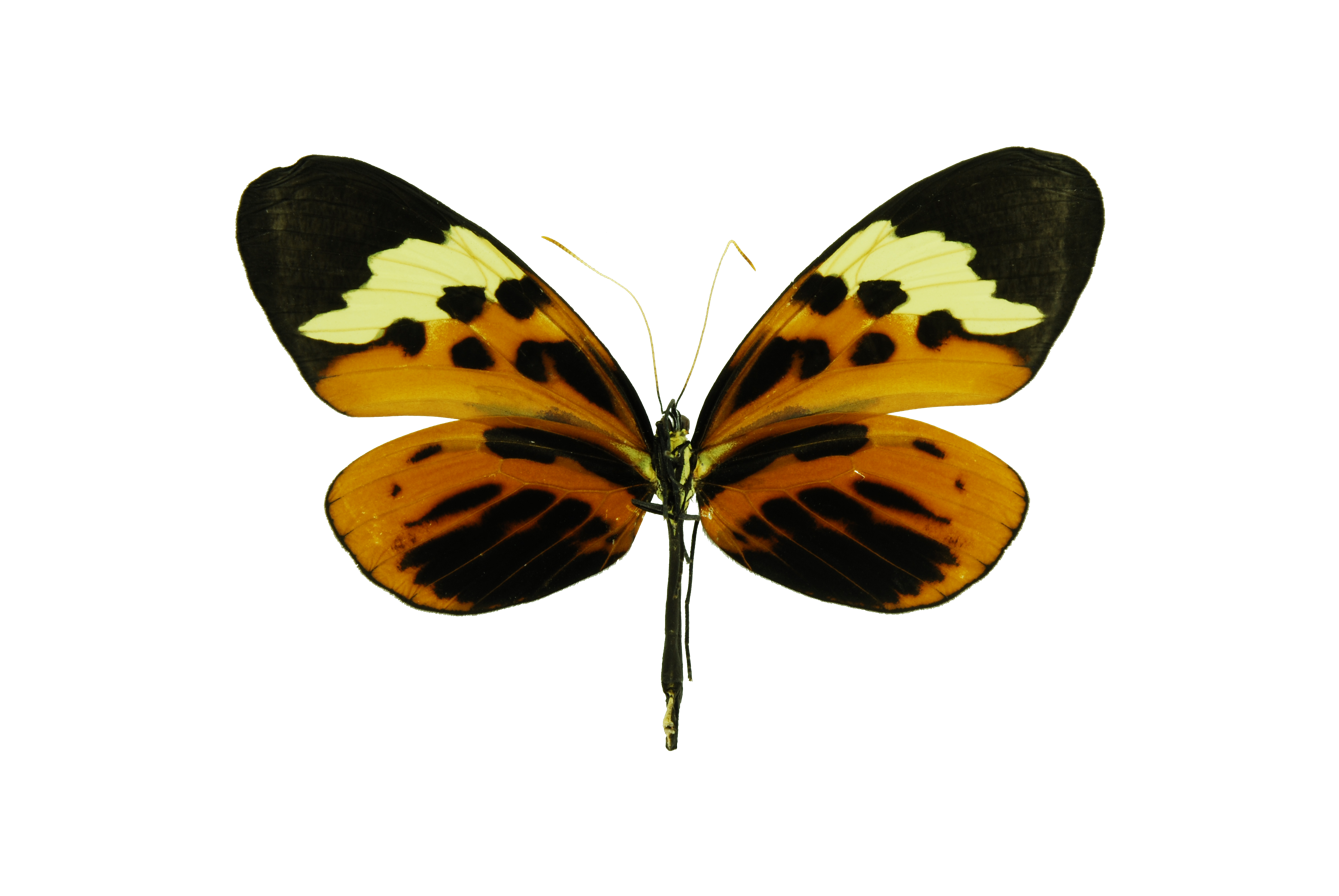
Ventral, Ecuador
