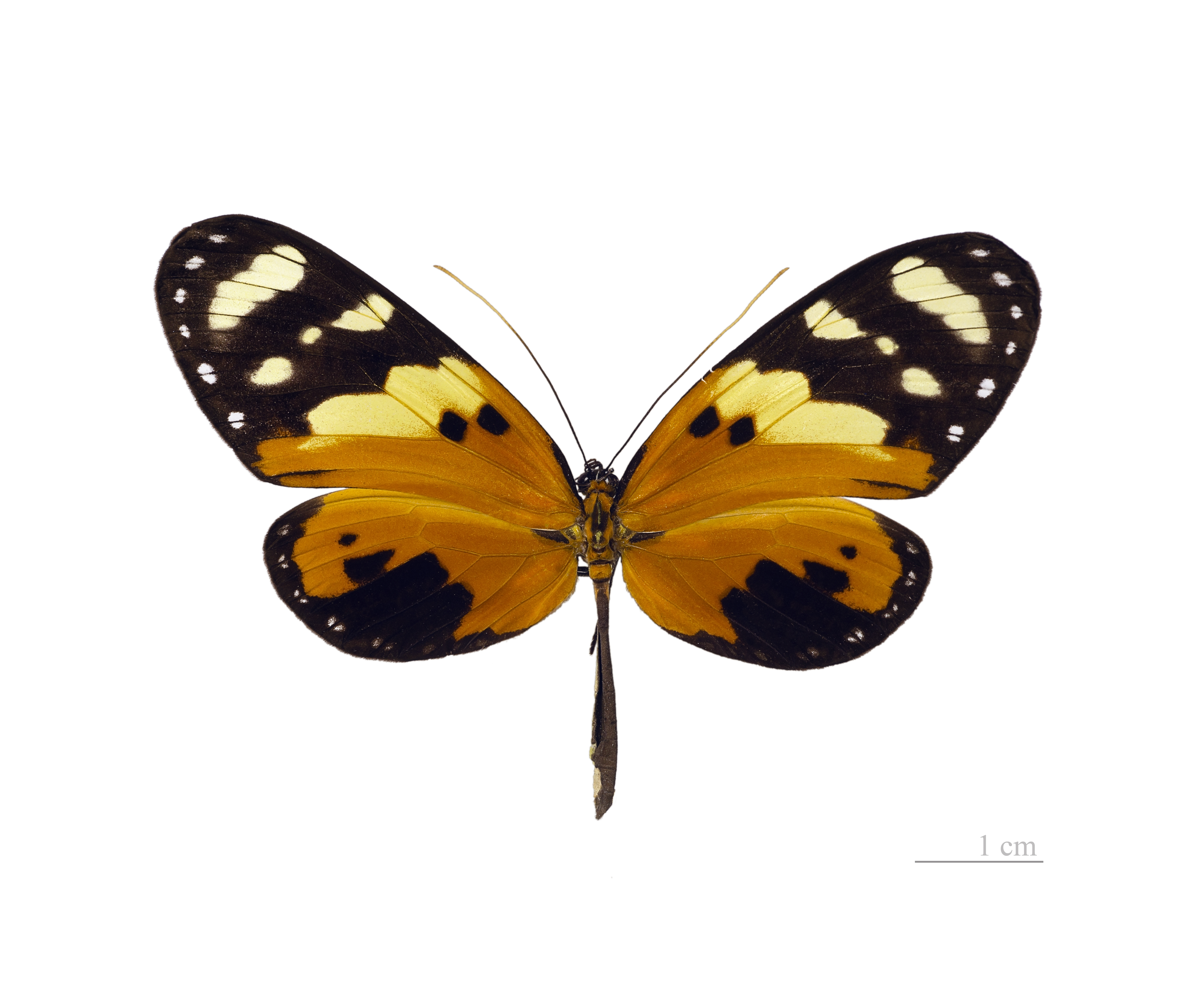
- Dorsal view
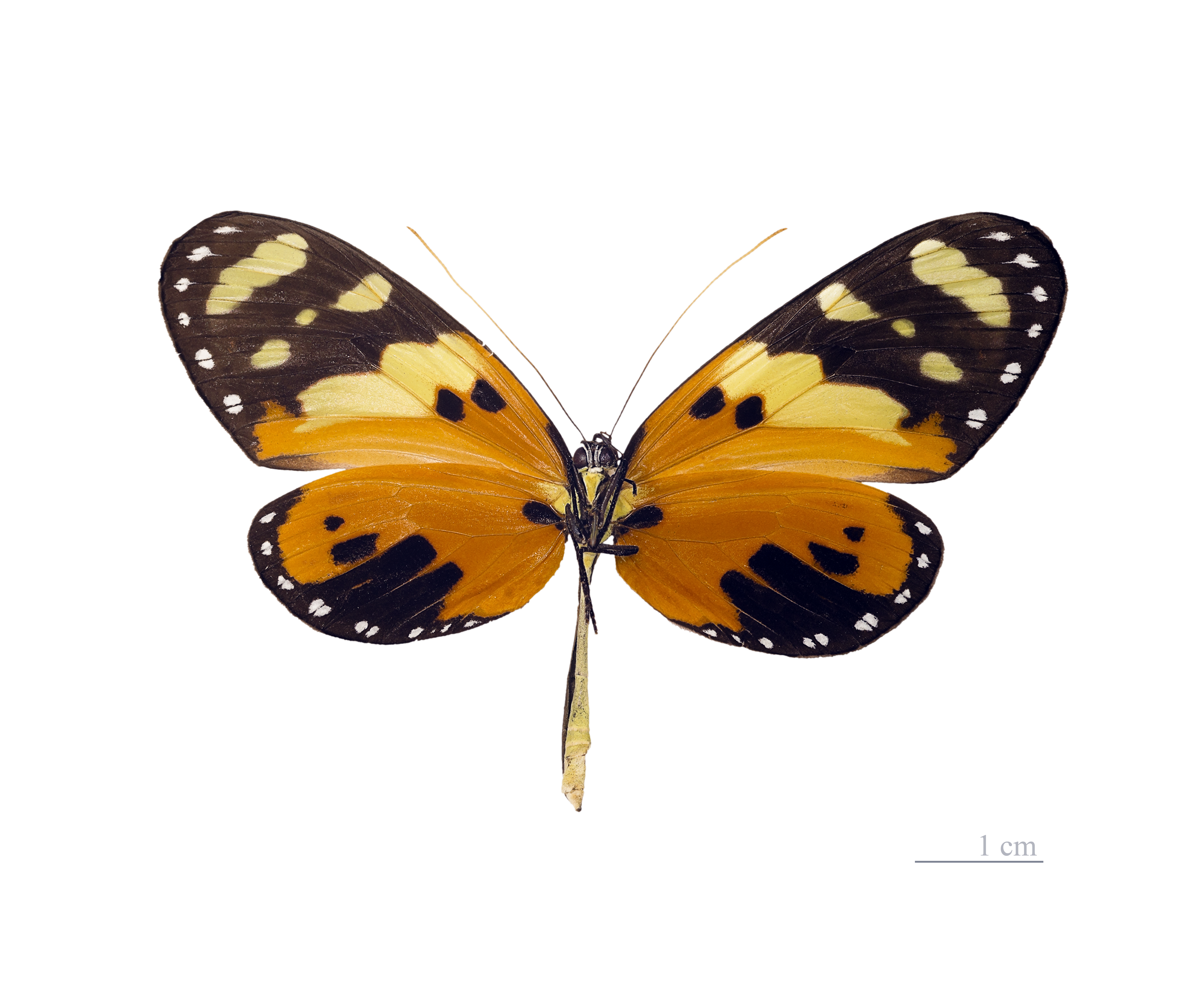
- Ventral view

Scientific classification
- Domain: Eukaryota
- Kingdom: Animalia
- Phylum: Arthropoda
- Class: Insecta
- Order: Lepidoptera
- Family: Nymphalidae
- Genus: Melinaea
- Species: M. ludovica

Binomial name
- Melinaea ludovica (Cramer, [1780])

Synonyms
- Papilio ludovica Cramer, [1780]; Papilio egina Cramer, [1777]

= Melinaea ludovica =

Species of butterfly

Melinaea ludovica is a species of butterfly of the family Nymphalidae found in South America.

== Subspecies ==
- Melinaea ludovica ludovica (Suriname, Guianas)
- Melinaea ludovica paraiya Reakirt, 1866 (Amazon, Brazil: Rio de Janeiro, Santa Catarina)
- Melinaea ludovica manuelito Tessmann, 1928 (Peru)
