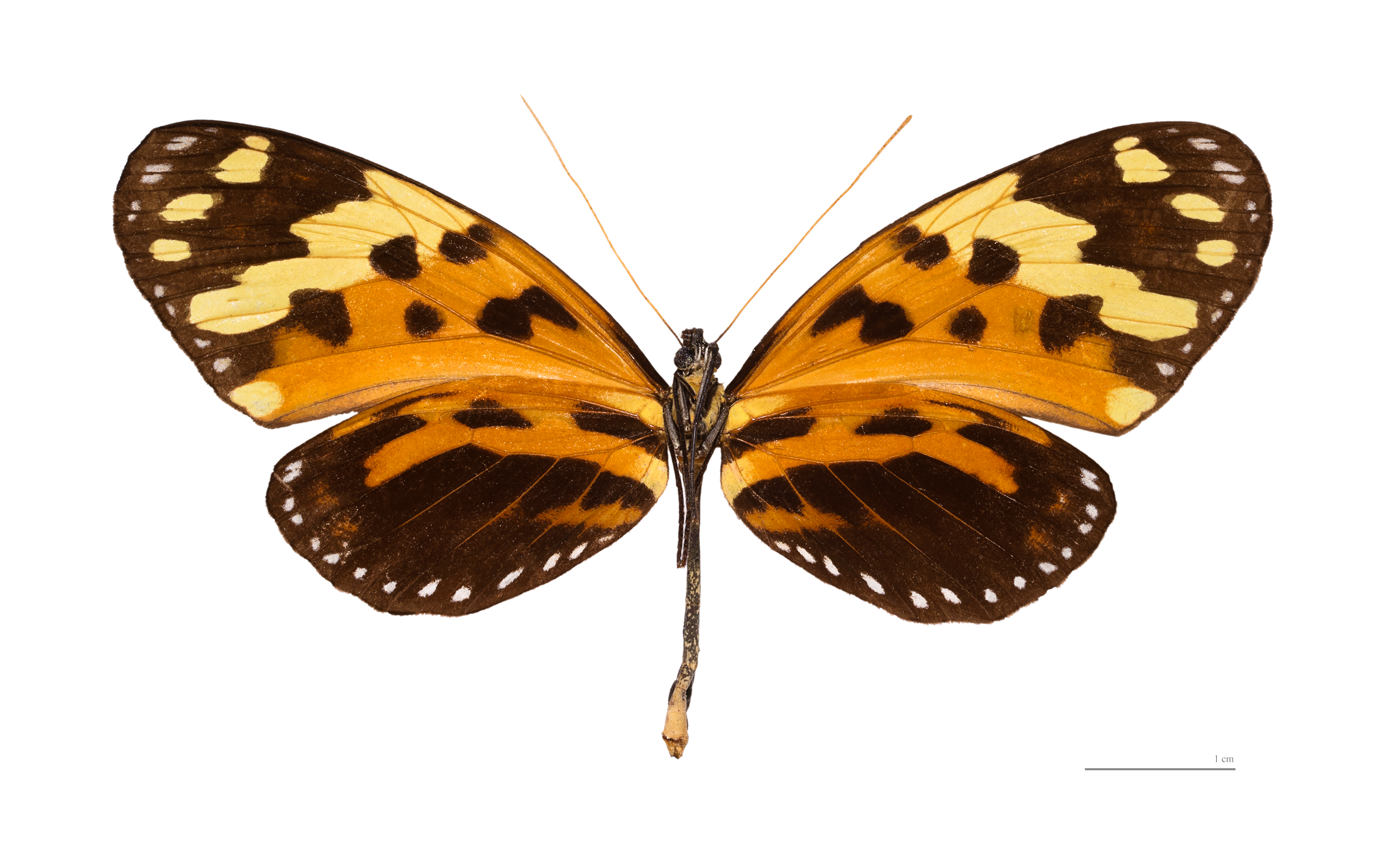

Scientific classification
- Kingdom: Animalia
- Phylum: Arthropoda
- Class: Insecta
- Order: Lepidoptera
- Family: Nymphalidae
- Genus: Melinaea
- Species: M. mneme

Binomial name
- Melinaea mneme (Linnaeus, 1763)

Synonyms
- Papilio mneme Linnaeus, 1763; Mechanitis polymnia Aurivillius, 1882

= Melinaea mneme =

Species of butterfly

Melinaea mneme is a species of butterfly of the family Nymphalidae first described by Carl Linnaeus in 1763. It is found in South America.

== Subspecies ==
- Melinaea mneme mneme (Suriname, Guianas)
- Melinaea mneme mauensis Weymer, 1891 (Brazil)
