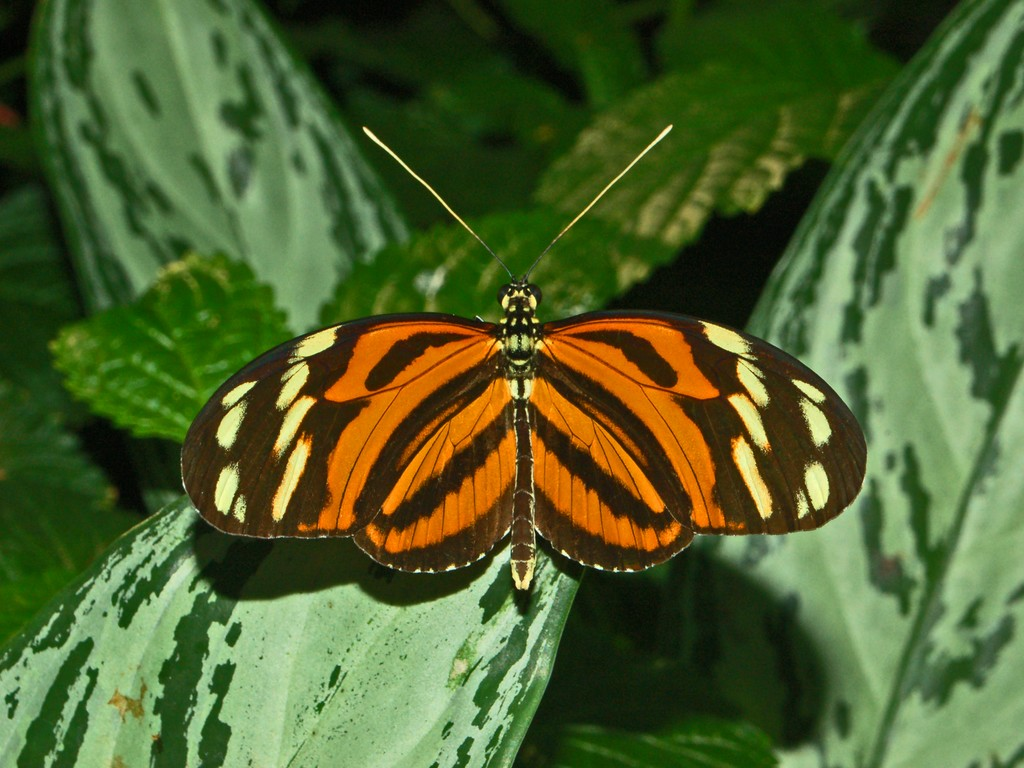
- Heliconius ismenius telchinia, dorsal view
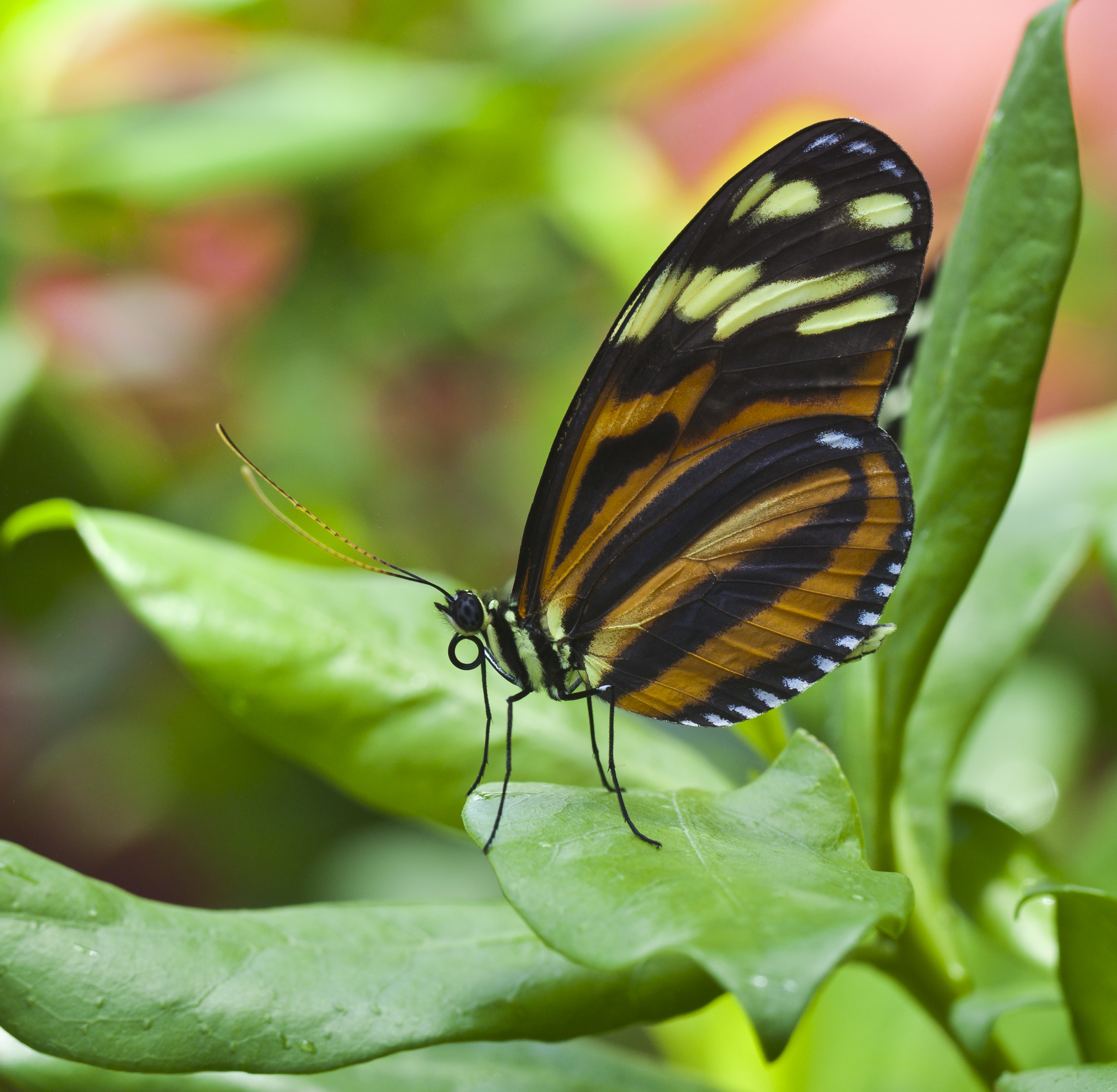
- Ventral view

Scientific classification
- Domain: Eukaryota
- Kingdom: Animalia
- Phylum: Arthropoda
- Class: Insecta
- Order: Lepidoptera
- Family: Nymphalidae
- Genus: Heliconius
- Species: H. ismenius

Binomial name
- Heliconius ismenius Latreille, [1817]

= Heliconius ismenius =

Species of butterfly

Heliconius ismenius, the Ismenius tiger or tiger heliconian, is a butterfly of the family Nymphalidae found in Central America and northern South America. They are abundant as far south as Ecuador and Venezuela and as far north as southern Mexico, Guatemala and Belize. H. ismenius are more commonly called the tiger-striped long wing butterfly. H. ismenius's nickname is derived from its long wing structure as well as the beautiful burnt orange and black stripes. Pierre André Latreille, a French zoologist, described Heliconius ismenius in 1817. H. ismenius resembles a number of other butterflies, an example of Müllerian mimicry.

== Life and characteristics ==
Like any other butterfly, Heliconius ismenius start as eggs, grow to a larval, caterpillar stage, pupate and then mature into butterflies. The eggs are spread out under separate leaves with the mother only placing one or two eggs in a specific location of the host plant. The eggs are small and yellow approximately 1.3 mm (height) x 0.8 mm (width). As the larvae mature, they become larger, approximately 2 cm in size, and become colored. They have an orange head and anal plate and a white body with black spots all over. According to Beltran, the pupae were observed to have a strong bowed thorax with five pairs of black spine in the abdomen. As well, the pupae are brown in color and contain an average of three gold colored spots on the pupae dorsum. As a grown butterfly the antenna have short black spines all around as well as the short horns on the head.

Heliconius ismenius are known for feeding on specific plants. The plant a specific H. ismenius stays on throughout its lifetime is called a host plant. The host plants popular for H. ismenius are found in subgenera Distephana and genera Granadilla. They feed on Passiflora platyloba, P. ambigua, P. alata, and P. pedata in Costa Rica only.

Throughout the rainforests they are found no higher than 1,500 meters. During the night, it is common that the adults form groups 3 to 10 meters above the ground. These groups are normally located along the forest edges on branches and tendrils of the host plants and trees.

=== Member of a Müllerian mimicry ring ===
Heliconius ismenius shares the appearance of a number of other similar looking butterflies, of both the same genus and other genera (Melinaea, Tithorea) as a member of the "tiger" Müllerian mimicry ring. Various butterfly species that share the trait of being toxic and unpalatable have evolved to share the same aposematic tiger stripe pattern to mutually advertise this protective trait, thereby increasing its recognition among predators.

== Subspecies ==
Listed alphabetically:

- Heliconius ismenius boulleti Neustetter, 1928
- Heliconius ismenius clarescens Butler, 1875 – tiger-striped longwing
- Heliconius ismenius fasciatus Godman & Salvin
- Heliconius ismenius ismenius Latreille, 1817
- Heliconius ismenius metaphorus Weymer, 1883
- Heliconius ismenius occidentalis Neustetter, 1928
- Heliconius ismenius telchinia Doubleday, 1847 – tiger-striped longwing
- Heliconius ismenius tilletti Brown & Fernández, 1976

== Gallery ==
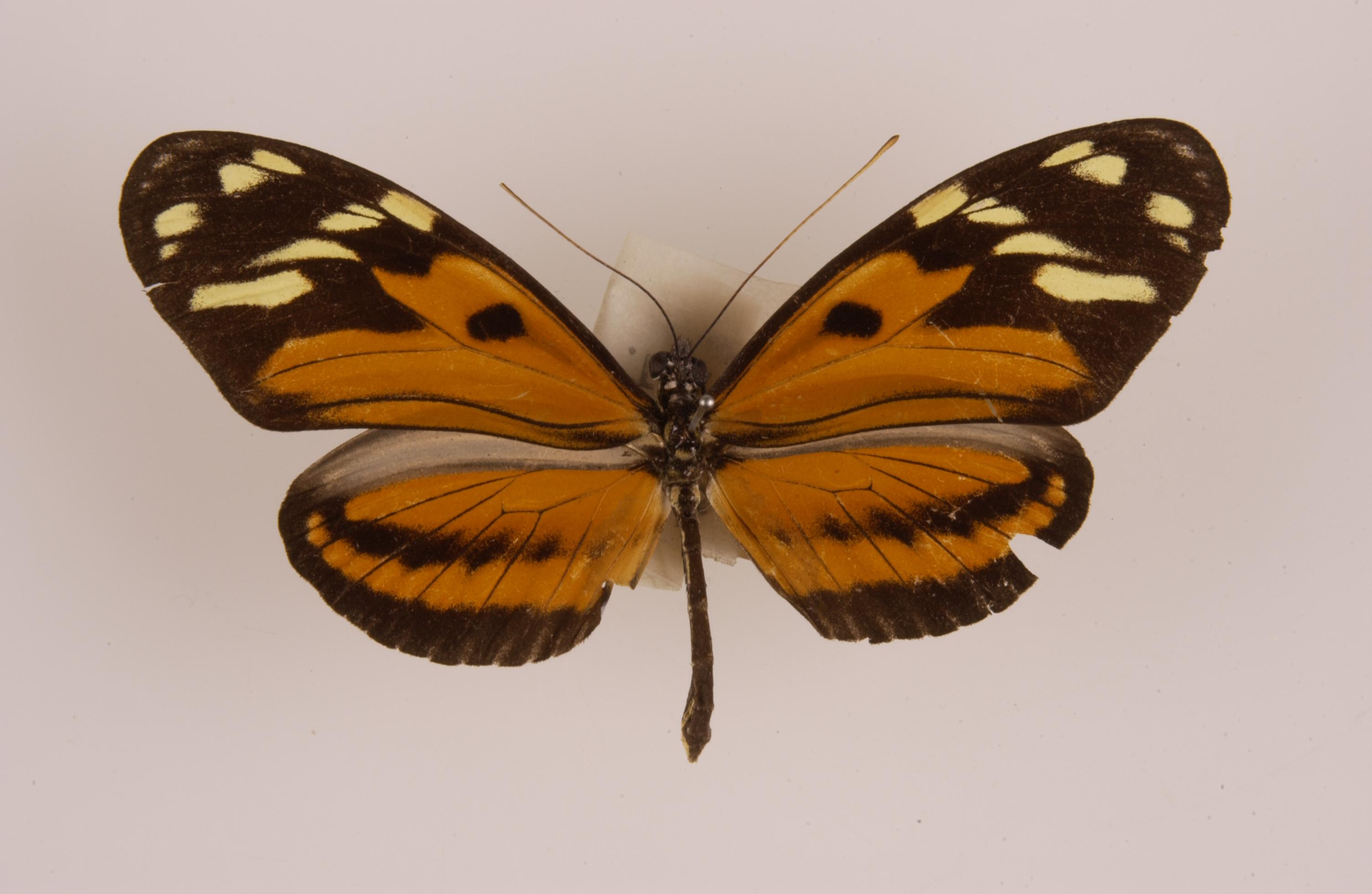
Mounted specimen

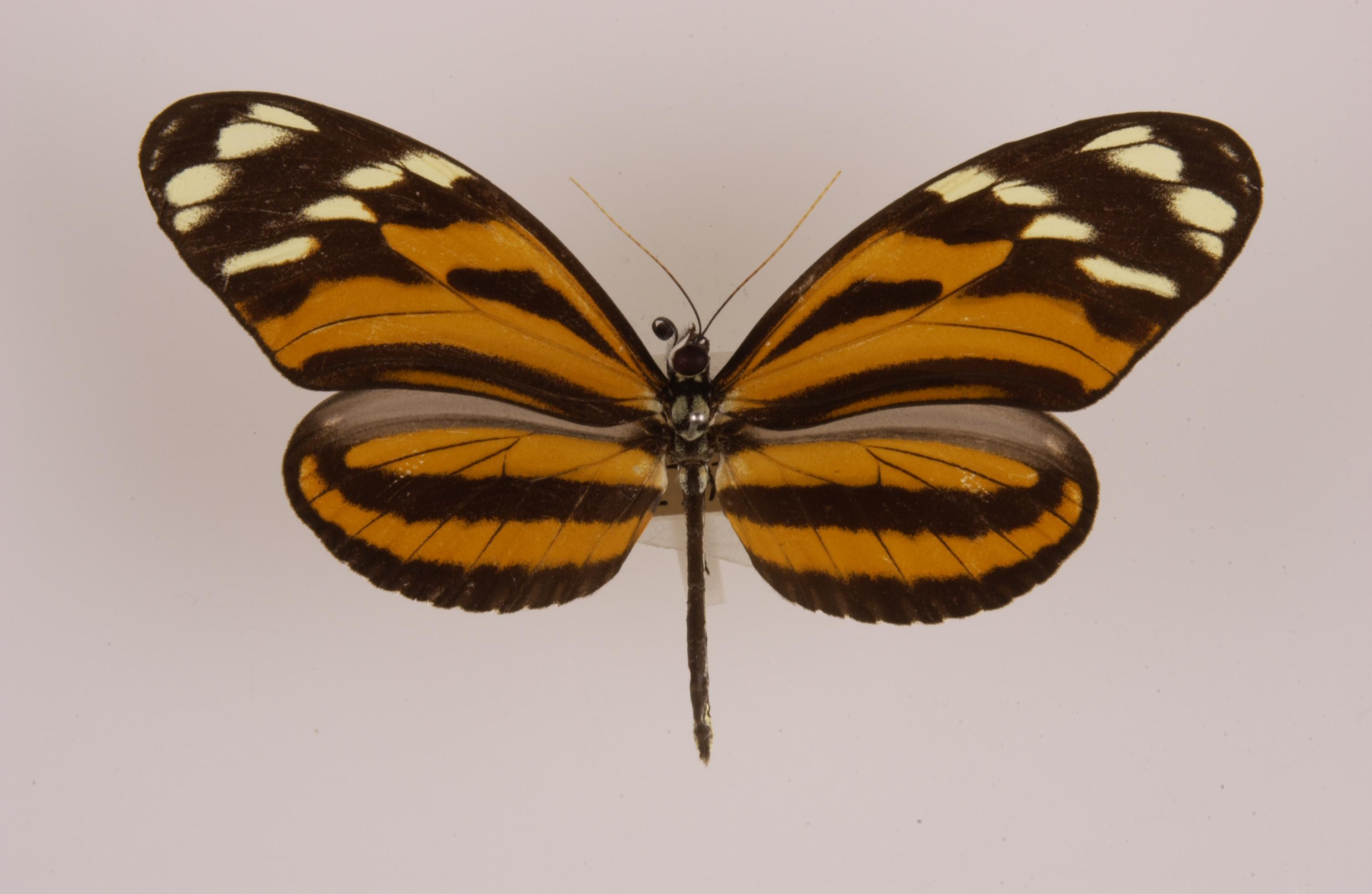
Mounted specimen

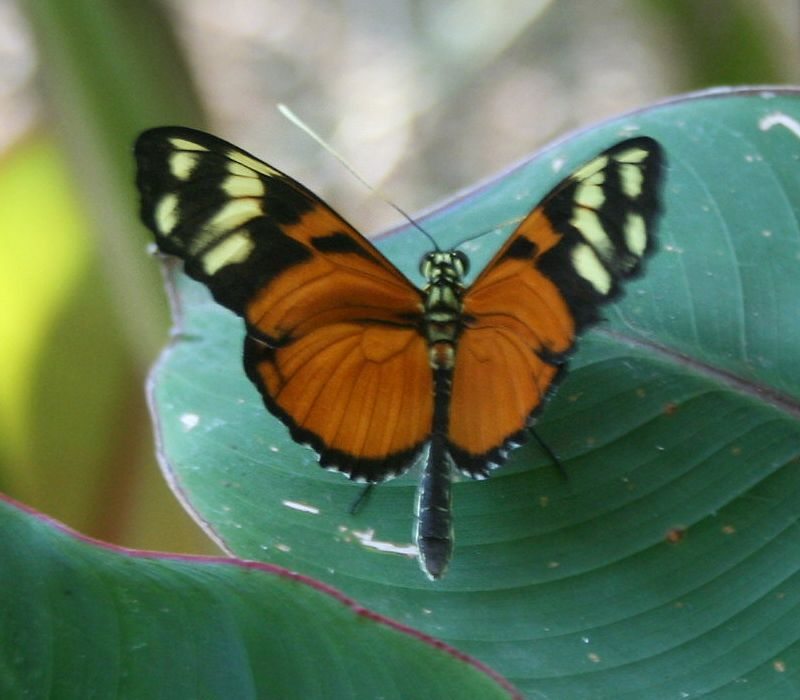
H. i. clarescens, dorsal view

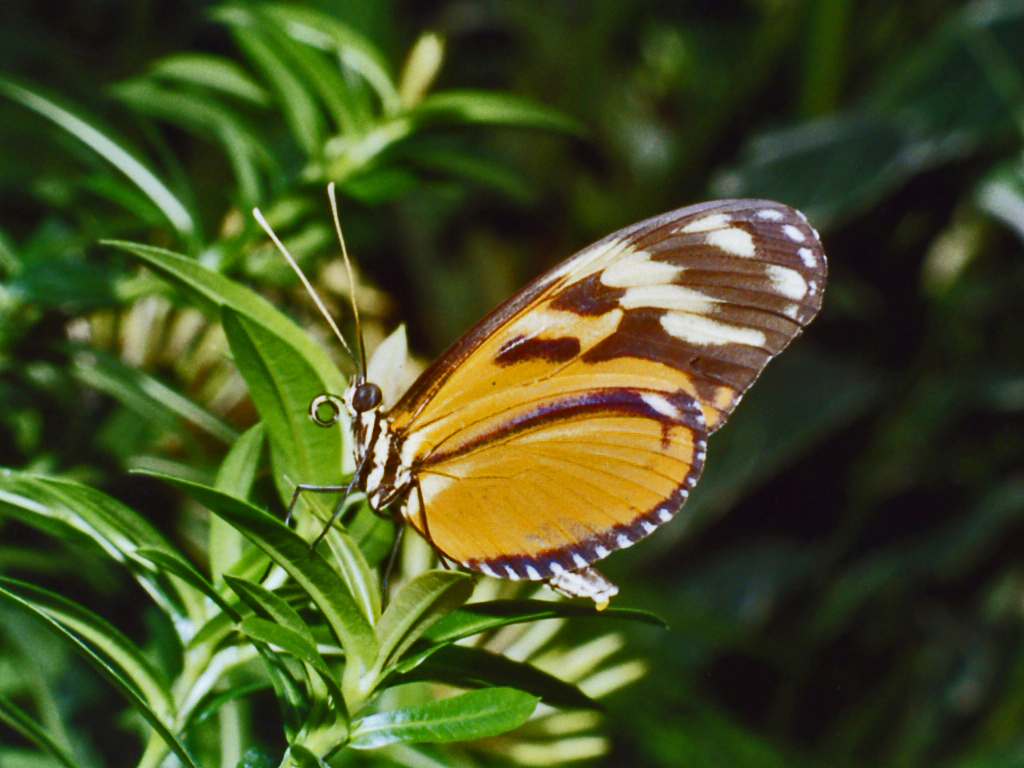
H. i. clarescens, ventral view
