= Inga densiflora =

Scientific classification
- Kingdom: Plantae
- Clade: Tracheophytes
- Clade: Angiosperms
- Clade: Eudicots
- Clade: Rosids
- Order: Fabales
- Family: Fabaceae
- Subfamily: Caesalpinioideae
- Clade: Mimosoid clade
- Genus: Inga
- Species: I. densiflora

Binomial name
- Inga densiflora Benth.

Synonyms
- Feuilleea densiflora (Benth.) Kuntze.; Inga montealegrei Standl.; Inga monticola Pittier; Inga sordida Pittier

Species of legume

Inga densiflora is a species of Fabaceae described by botanist George Bentham. The native range extends from South-East Mexico to Bolivia. It is the most common species of Inga utilized for its fruits in the highlands of Colombia. The common name is Guamo Salado in Central America and Pacay del Monte (mountain ice-cream-bean) in Bolivia.
