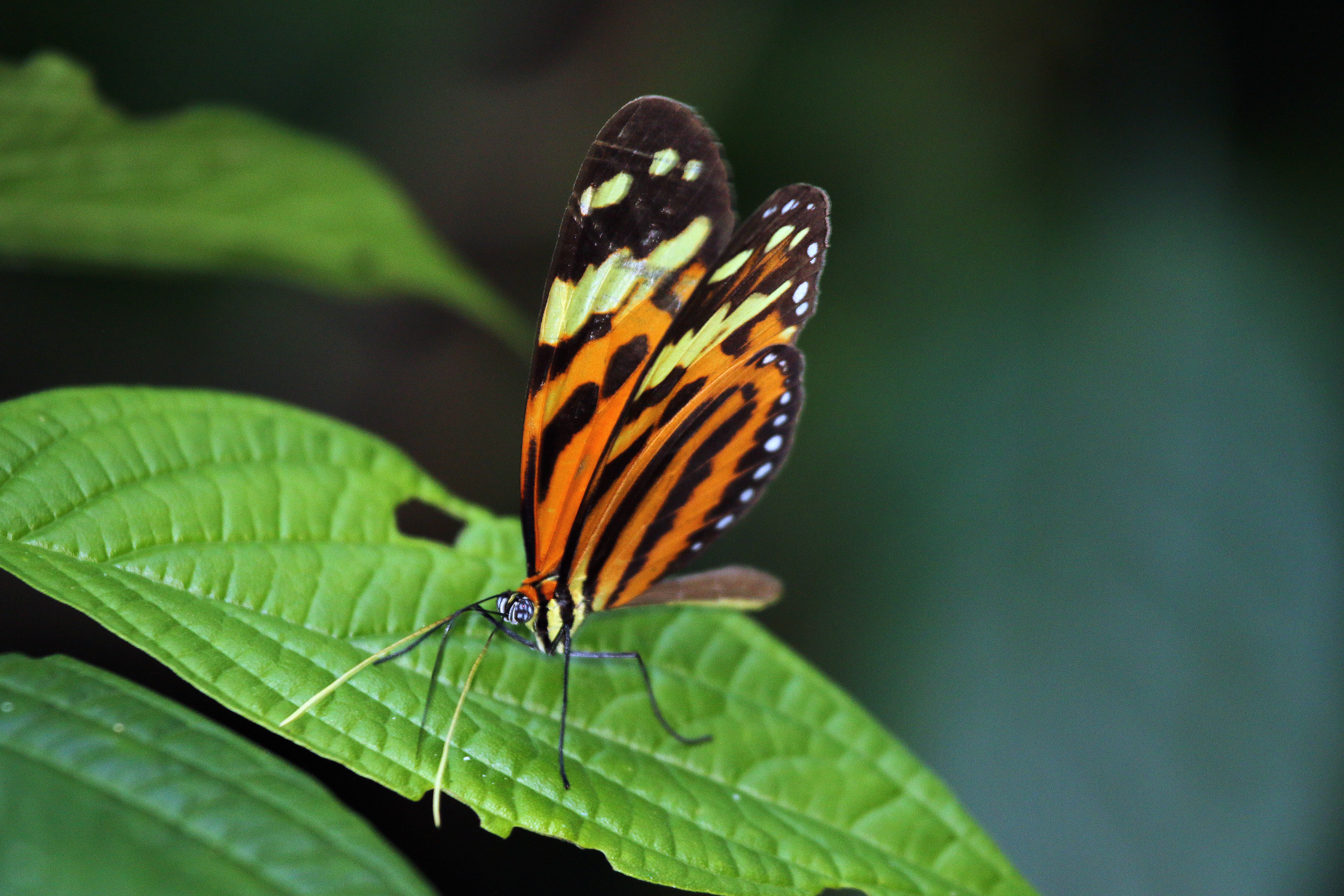
- M. lilis sola, Trinidad

Scientific classification
- Domain: Eukaryota
- Kingdom: Animalia
- Phylum: Arthropoda
- Class: Insecta
- Order: Lepidoptera
- Family: Nymphalidae
- Tribe: Ithomiini
- Genus: Melinaea; Hübner, 1816

Species
- See text

Synonyms
- Melinaea Bates, 1862; Czakia Kremky, 1925

= Melinaea =

Genus of brush-footed butterflies

Melinaea is a genus of clearwing (ithomiine) butterflies. They are in the brush-footed butterfly family, Nymphalidae.

== Species ==
Arranged alphabetically:

- Melinaea ethra (Godart, 1819)
- Melinaea idae (Felder & Felder, 1862)
- Melinaea isocomma Forbes, 1948
- Melinaea lilis (Doubleday, 1847)
- Melinaea ludovica (Cramer, [1780])
- Melinaea marsaeus (Hewitson, 1860)
- Melinaea menophilus (Hewitson, 1856) – Hewitson's tiger
- Melinaea mnasias (Hewitson, 1856)
- Melinaea mneme (Linnaeus, 1763)
- Melinaea mnemopsis Berg, 1897
- Melinaea satevis (Doubleday, 1847)
