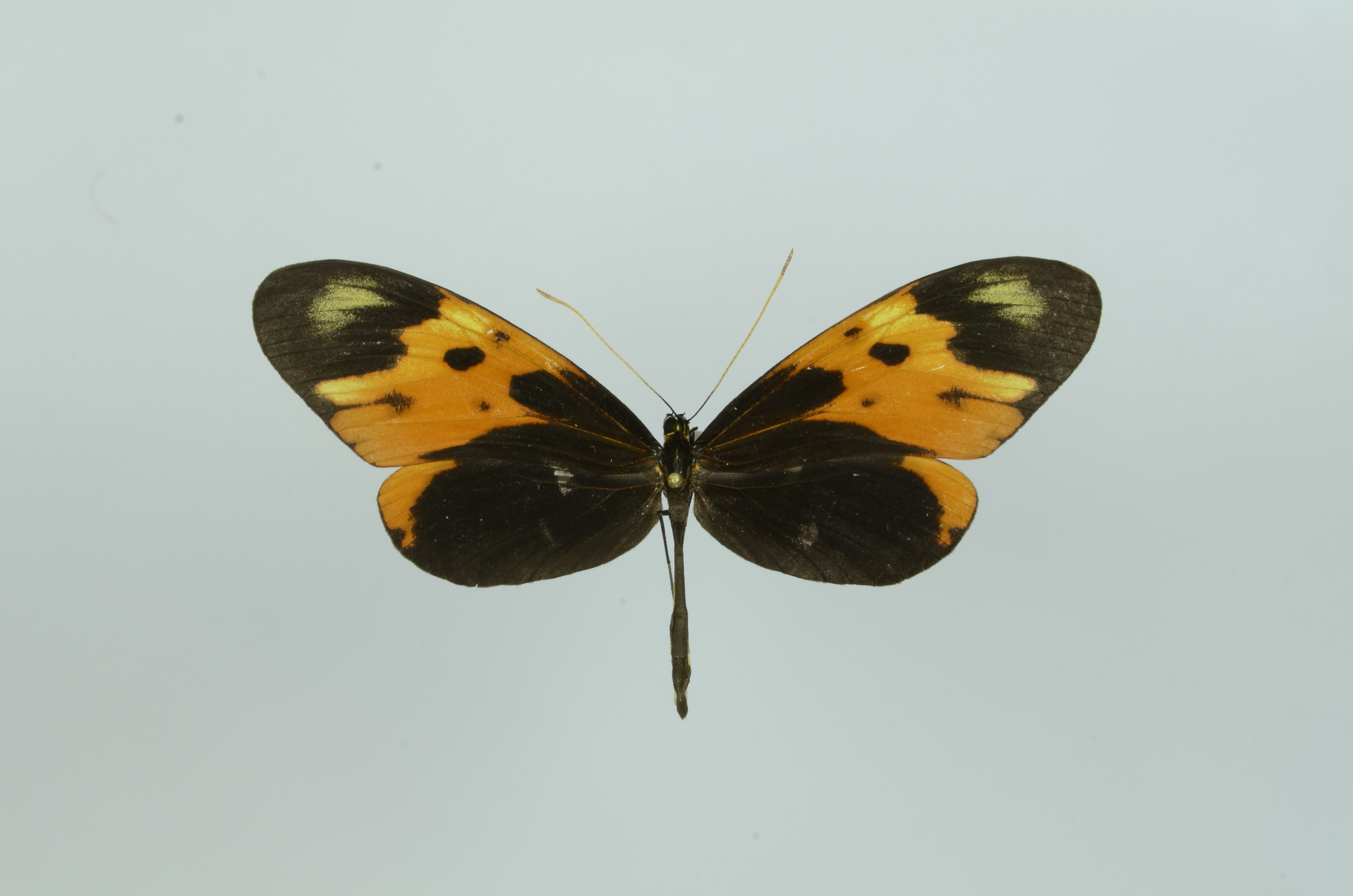
- M. m. messenoides

Scientific classification
- Domain: Eukaryota
- Kingdom: Animalia
- Phylum: Arthropoda
- Class: Insecta
- Order: Lepidoptera
- Family: Nymphalidae
- Genus: Mechanitis
- Species: M. mazaeus

Binomial name
- Mechanitis mazaeus Hewitson, 1860

Synonyms
- Mechanitis mazaeus ab. nigroapicalis Haensch, 1905; Mechanitis foxi d'Almeida, 1951; Mechanitis polymnia var. egaensis Bates, 1862; Mechanitis obscura Butler, 1877; Mechanitis egaensis contracta Riley, 1919; Mechanitis egaensis obumbrata d'Almeida, 1951; Mechanitis messenoides C. & R. Felder, 1865; Mechanitis deceptus Butler, 1873; Mechanitis mazaeus simplex Bryk, 1953; Mechanitis fallax Butler, 1873; Mechanitis polymnia var. plagifera Staudinger, 1885; Mechanitis mazaeus ab. phasianita Haensch, 1905; Mechanitis mazaeus ab. lucifera Haensch, 1905; Mechanitis visenda elevata Riley, 1919; Mechanitis lorigae Fernández, 1928; Mechanitis egaensis septentrionalis Apolinar, 1928; Mechanitis mazaeus williamsi Fox, 1941; Mechanitis pannifera Butler, 1877; Mechanitis visenda Butler, 1877; Mechanitis messenoides ballucatus Fox, 1967

= Mechanitis mazaeus =

Mazaeus tigerwing

Species of butterfly

Mechanitis mazaeus, the Mazaeus tigerwing, is a species of butterfly of the family Nymphalidae. It is found in South America.

The larvae have been recorded feeding on Solanum species, including S. subnerme.

== Subspecies ==
- M. m. mazaeus (Brazil)
- M. m. beebei Forbes, 1948 (Venezuela)
- M. m. egaensis Bates, 1862 (Brazil)
- M. m. deceptus Butler, 1873 (Ecuador and Peru)
- M. m. fallax Butler, 1873 (Colombia, Brazil and Peru)
- M. m. holmgreni Bryk, 1953 (Bolivia and Peru)
- M. m. lanei Fox, 1967 (Brazil)
- M. m. messenoides C. & R. Felder, 1865 (Colombia)
- M. m. pannifera Butler, 1877 (Suriname, the Guyanas and Brazil)
- M. m. pothetoide d'Almeida, 1951 (Brazil)
- M. m. visenda Butler, 1877 (Brazil)

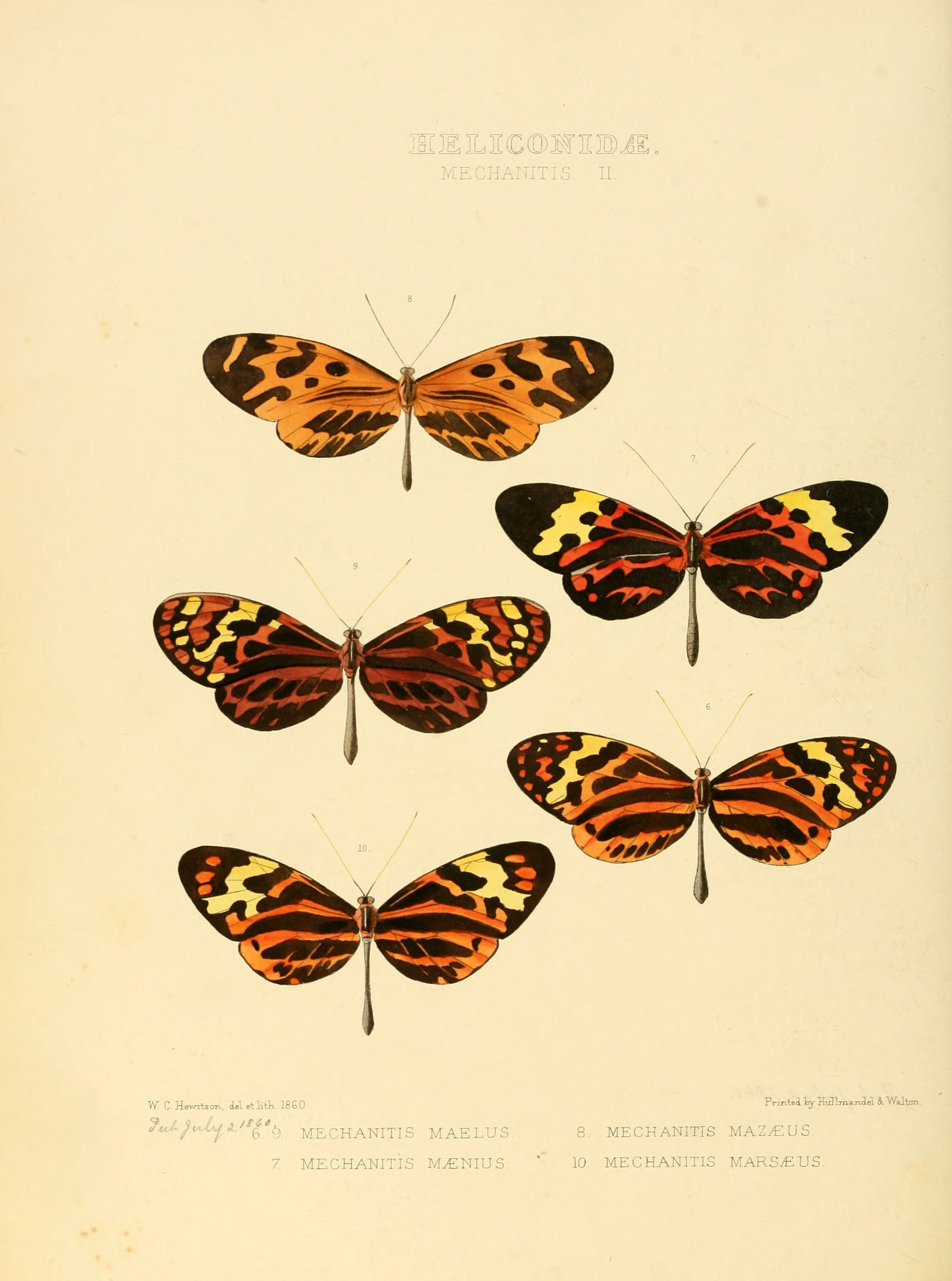
Top figure is M. mazaeus
