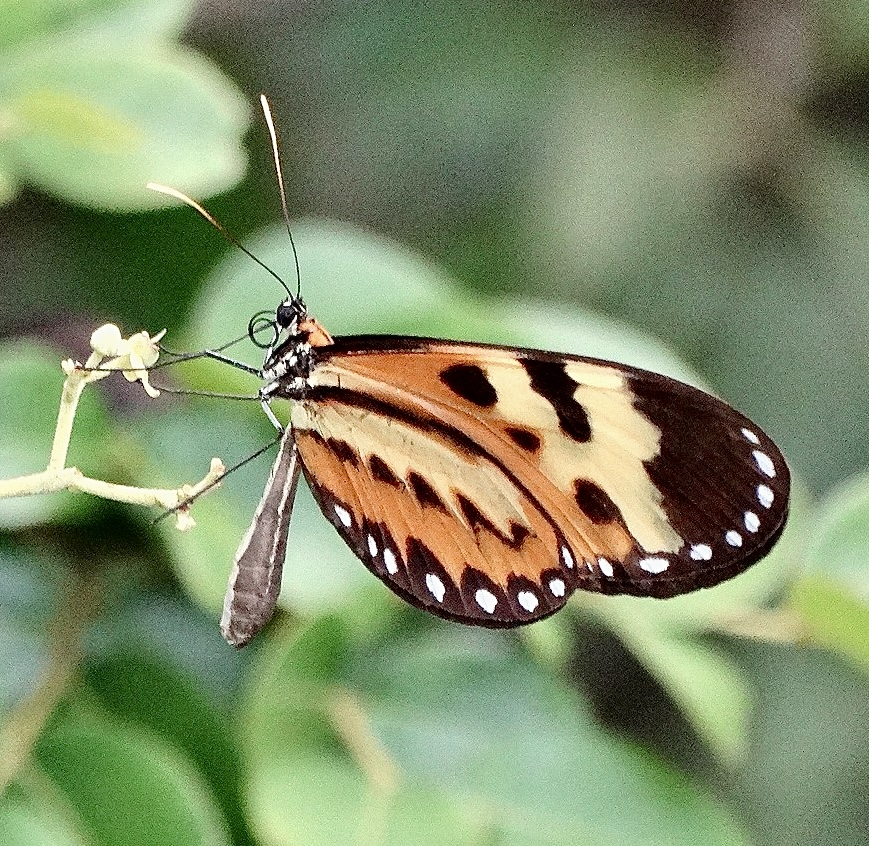
- Mechanitis polymnia

Scientific classification
- Kingdom: Animalia
- Phylum: Arthropoda
- Class: Insecta
- Order: Lepidoptera
- Family: Nymphalidae
- Tribe: Ithomiini
- Genus: Mechanitis; Fabricius, 1807

Species
- See text

Synonyms
- Nereis Hübner, [1806]; Hymenitis [Illiger], 1807; Epimetes Billberg, 1820

= Mechanitis =

Genus of brush-footed butterflies

Mechanitis is a genus of butterflies in the tribe Ithomiini, commonly known as tigerwings. They were named by Johan Christian Fabricius in 1807. They are in the brush-footed butterfly family, Nymphalidae. Members of the genus Mechanitis were named for the machine-like metallic appearance of the chrysalis in certain species such as the Mechanitis polymnia. The chrysalises have a reflective chitin coating with a metallic appearance.

== Taxonomy ==
Mechanitis was described by Johan Christian Fabricius in 1807. Members of the genus Mechanitis in the brush-footed butterfly family, Nymphalidae. Mechanitis are in the Ithomiini tribe which includes other Neotropical species of butterflies. The classification of Mechanitis, when based entirely on appearance of wing pattern and color is inaccurate because of the incidence of polymorphic butterflies. When wing patterns are similar the accuracy in identifying butterfly species is improved with the use of ecological and mitochondrial DNA.

== Description ==
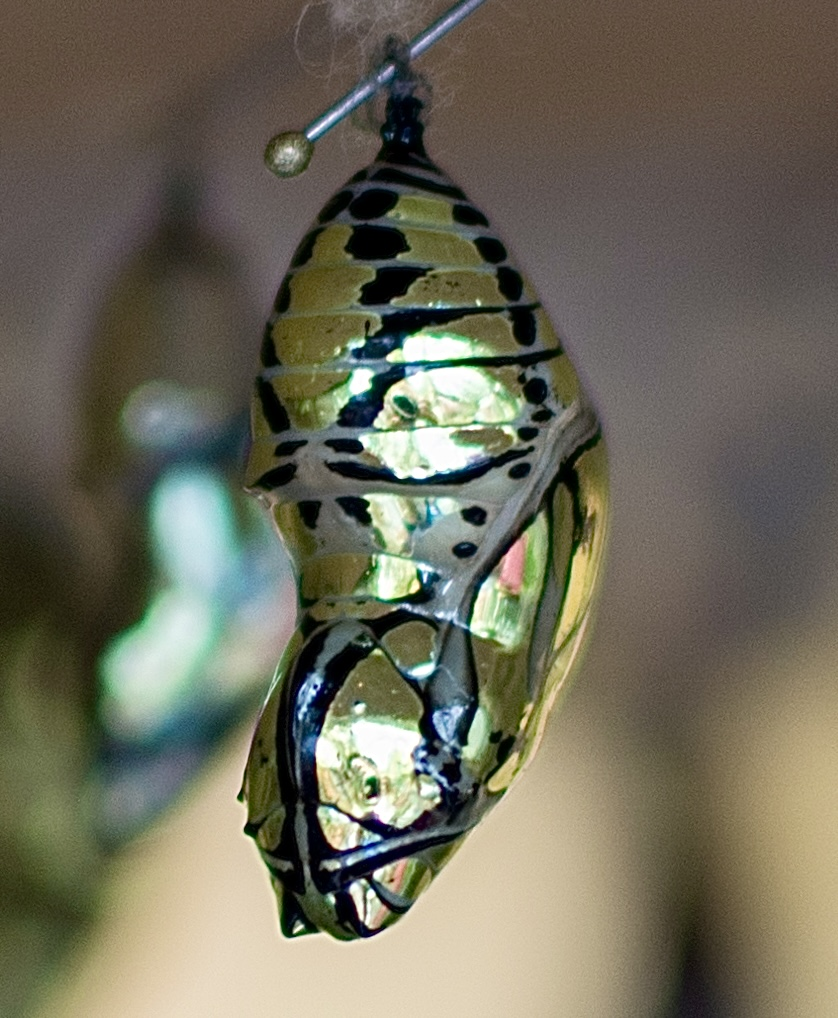
Mechanitis polymnia Chrysalis

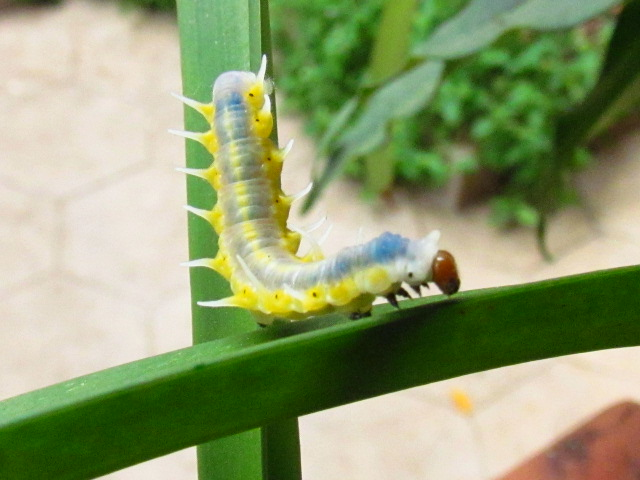
Mechanitis lysimnia Caterpillar

Butterflies in the genus Mechanitis are abundant and they are unpalatable. The mature Mechanitis butterflies in the genus have warning colors which are black, orange, and yellow. They also have tiger patterns on their wings. The butterfly gets the name Mechanitis from the chrysalises of the genus, which have a machine-like quality. They are thin and small bodied butterflies with rounded wings and long yellow antennae. The size of the adult or imago Mechanitis butterfly is 65–75 mm.

== Life history ==
The species are primarily forest butterflies and they are found at sea level and as high as 3,000 feet (910 m) above sea level in rainforests and humid forests. Female members of the genus Mechanitis lay their eggs in clusters on the small hairs found on the leaves of poisonous plants in the genus of solanum and in the family Apocynaceae. When the elongated white eggs hatch, the larva – caterpillars – feed in groups on the foliage. Some eggs clusters are also laid on food plants, which can result in them being destroyed by predators. Up to three egg clusters can be found on one plant, but only one is found per leaf. If a female Mechanitis is disturbed while laying the eggs on the upper side of a leaf, she flies away but returns to the same leaf to continue ovipositing. The egg clusters of the Mechanitis isthmia can range between 30 and 60 eggs. Those plants which are exposed to direct sunlight during most of the day are chosen for ovipositing. Most egg clusters are to be found on leaves less than a meter above the surface. After the eggs develop into larvae, the larvae begin to feed themselves from the leaf on which they were laid, and later move on to other leaves. Feeding is performed in tight groups in intervals. Sometimes one group rests, while another one feeds.

=== Reflective chrysalis ===
The pupa – chrysalis – of the Mechanitis polymnia have a mirror-like metallic appearance. The polymnia chrysalises have a reflective coating which conceals the defenseless pupa by reflecting its surroundings to confuse predators. It is thought that predators see their own reflection in the chrysalis and then flee. Another theory is that a reflective exterior does not reduce predation but it may assist the larva in regulating their body temperature while pupating.

The metallic-looking coating of the chrysalis is made of chitin. The substance is also found in coatings on other insects such as jewel beetles. Unlike the jewel beetles, which retain their chitin, the Mechanitis chrysalis loses the reflective coating in about a week. The fragile coating which gives the chrysalis of the Mechanitis its golden sheen is caused by light reflecting on the transparent chitin. The coating is dense, and there are up to 25 transparent layers which lie in the yellow-orange spectrum; the human eye then perceives the coating as gold. The chrysalis begins as blue or greenish, and then appears "golden" or "silver" after about two to four days.

=== Mating ===
Biologists believe the chemical scent diffusion is influential in mating. When a male butterfly chases another butterfly with a similar color pattern which is recognized as female, he hovers over it, fanning it from the front and back. If the target is recognized as a male, the chasing butterfly usually returns to his original observational place. If the female is receptive to the courting, they try to mate. If they are disturbed during mating, the female usually carries the male to another place to mate. After mating, the butterflies separate again and fly their own ways.

== Distribution ==
Mechanitis are found in the rainforests of South America and in Central America as far north as Mexico. The genus is distributed throughout the humid forests from Mexico to southern Brazil, into Paraguay, and stretching to three of the Caribbean islands. They have also been found in the Andean region of Colombia.

== Species ==
Arranged alphabetically:

Image	Caterpillar	Scientific name	Distribution
		Mechanitis lysimnia (Fabricius, 1793) – confused tigerwing	southern Mexico to Uruguay
		Mechanitis mazaeus Hewitson, 1860 – Mazaeus tigerwing	South America
		Mechanitis menapis Hewitson, [1856] – variable tigerwing	South America
		Mechanitis polymnia (Linnaeus, 1758) – disturbed tigerwing, orange-spotted tiger clearwing	from Mexico to the Amazon rainforest
