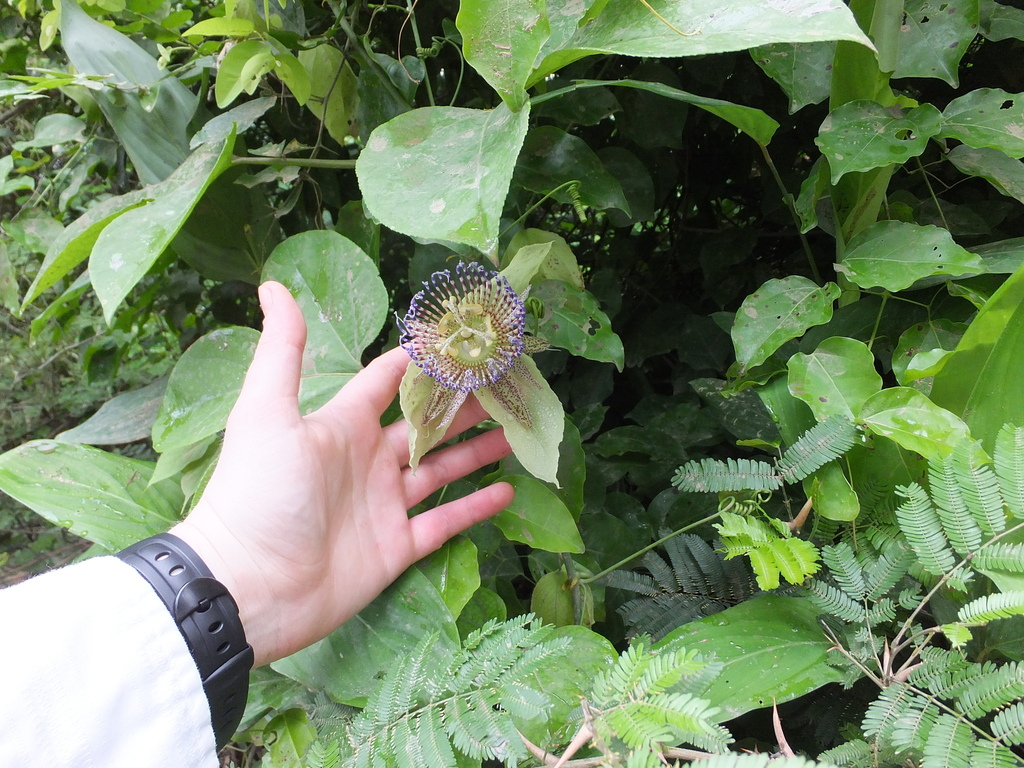

Scientific classification
- Kingdom: Plantae
- Clade: Tracheophytes
- Clade: Angiosperms
- Clade: Eudicots
- Clade: Rosids
- Order: Malpighiales
- Family: Passifloraceae
- Genus: Passiflora
- Species: P. platyloba

Binomial name
- Passiflora platyloba Killip

Varieties
- Passiflora platyloba var. platyloba; Passiflora platyloba var. pubescens (Griseb.) J.M.MacDougal

= Passiflora platyloba =

Species of flowering plant

Passiflora platyloba is a species of flowering plant in the family Passifloraceae. It is a climbing plant with purple flowers. The species is native to Mexico central America, and Colombia, and was described in 1922.

== Taxonomy ==
The species was described by Ellsworth Paine Killip in 1922.

Two varieties are recognised:

- Passiflora platyloba var. platyloba
- Passiflora platyloba var. pubescens (Griseb.) J.M.MacDougal

== Distribution ==
Passiflora platyloba is native to the wet tropical biome of Colombia, Costa Rica, El Salvador, Guatemala, Honduras, south-east Mexico, Nicaragua, and Panamá.

== Description ==
Passiflora platyloba is a climbing plant. The stem is stout and cylindrical.

The leaf stems are 6–7 centimetres (2.4–2.8 in) long. The leaves are suborbicular to ovate, 10–14 centimetres (3.9–5.5 in) long, and 12–18 centimetres (4.7–7.1 in) wide. The flower is enclosed by bracts, which are 5–6 centimetres (2.0–2.4 in) long, and 3–4 centimetres (1.2–1.6 in) wide.

The flower stems are solitary, and 6–7 centimetres (2.4–2.8 in) long. The flower is purple, 4–5 centimetres (1.6–2.0 in) wide, and has a tube around 1 centimetre (0.39 in) long. The sepals are oblong-lanceolate, 1.8–2 centimetres (0.71–0.79 in) long, around 0.8 centimetres (0.31 in) wide, and slightly fleshy. The petals are linear-lanceolate, 1.5–1.7 centimetres (0.59–0.67 in) long, and around 0.5 centimetres (0.20 in) wide. The flower has coronas with several series of filaments.

Passiflora platyloba resembles Passiflora seemannii, though the former has longer bracts.

== Uses ==
Passiflora platyloba is used for food and medicine.

== Nomenclature ==
In Spanish, the species is known as Burucuyá.
