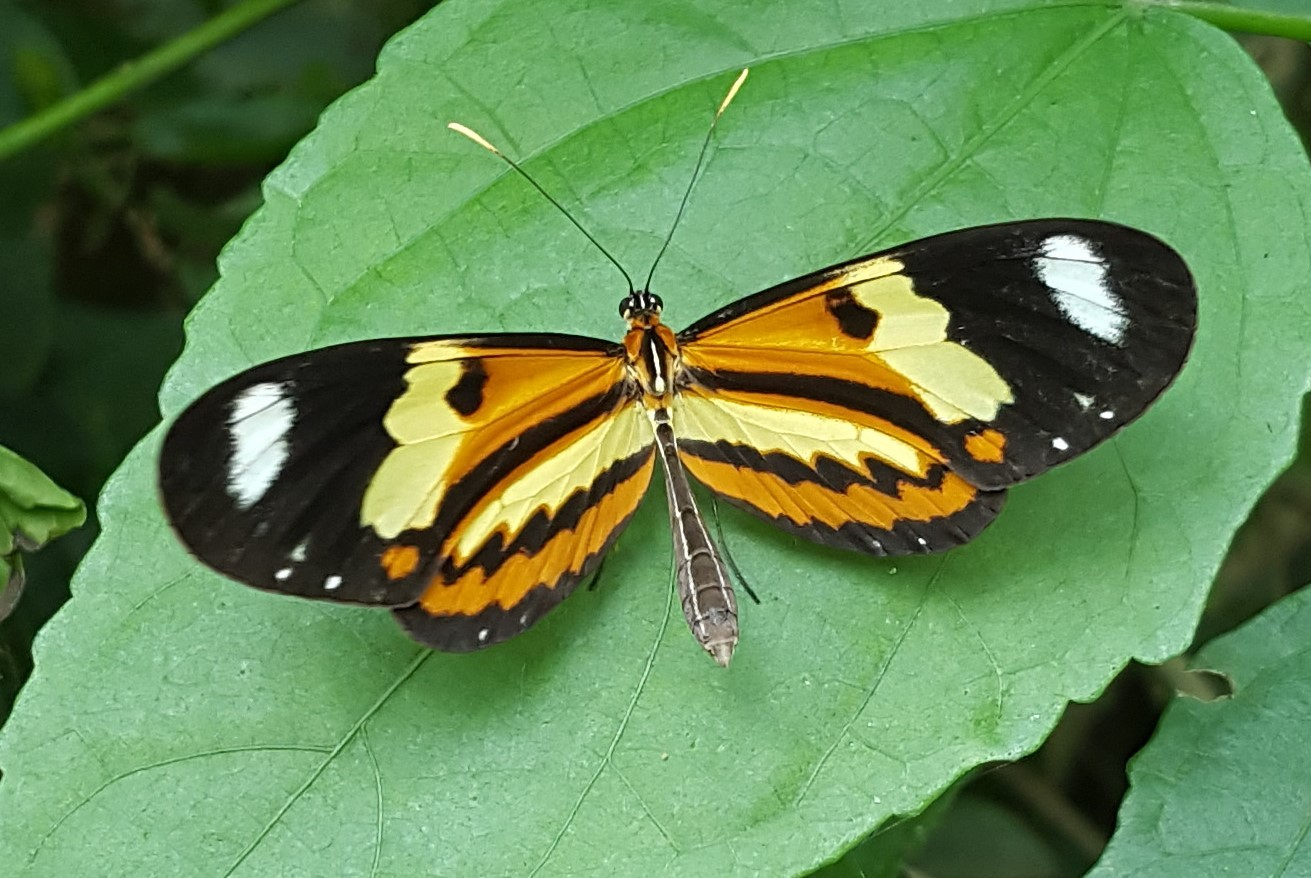

Scientific classification
- Domain: Eukaryota
- Kingdom: Animalia
- Phylum: Arthropoda
- Class: Insecta
- Order: Lepidoptera
- Family: Nymphalidae
- Genus: Mechanitis
- Species: M. lysimnia

Binomial name
- Mechanitis lysimnia (Fabricius, 1793)

Synonyms
- Papilio lysimnia Fabricius, 1793; Heliconia lysimnia; Heliconia aurea Moreira, 1881; Heliconia narcea Moreira, 1881; Mechanitis lysimnia ab. albescens Haensch, 1905; Papilio castalia Larrañaga, 1923 (preocc. Fabricius, 1793); Mechanitis nesaea Hübner, [1820]; Mechanitis lysimnia ab. sulphurescens Haensch, 1905; Heliconia lysimnia elisa Guérin-Méneville, [1844]; Mechanitis elisa connectens Talbot, 1928; Mechanitis macrinus Hewitson, 1860; Mechanitis numerianus C. & R. Felder, 1865; Mechanitis macrinus blissi Fox, 1942; Mechanitis menecles Hewitson, 1860; Mechanitis elisa acreana d'Almeida, 1950; Mechanitis utemaia Reakirt, 1866; Mechanitis doryssus f. utemaia ab. extrema Hoffmann, 1940; Mechanitis labotas Distant, 1876; Mechanitis ocona Druce, 1876; Mechanitis vilcanota Röber, 1904; Mechanitis mantineus f. forbesi Bryk, 1937

= Mechanitis lysimnia =

Species of butterfly

Mechanitis lysimnia, the confused tigerwing, sweet-oil tiger or lysimnia tigerwing, is a species of butterfly of the family Nymphalidae. It was described by Johan Christian Fabricius in 1793. It is found in Central and South America, from southern Mexico to Uruguay. The habitat consists of disturbed forests at altitudes up to 1,500 metres (4,900 ft).

Adults have been recorded feeding on nectar from Eupatorium flowers.

The larvae are gregarious and feed on Solanum species and possibly other members of the family Solanaceae. They are pale green streaked with yellow.

== Subspecies ==
- M. l. lysimnia (Brazil, Uruguay)
- M. l. bipuncta Forbes, 1948 (Venezuela)
- M. l. elisa (Guérin-Méneville, [1844]) (Ecuador, Peru, Bolivia, Brazil: Mato Grosso)
- M. l. labotas Distant, 1876 (Costa Rica)
- M. l. limnaea Forbes, 1930 (French Guiana)
- M. l. macrinus Hewitson, 1860 (Panama, Colombia, Ecuador)
- M. l. menecles Hewitson, 1860 (Brazil: Amazonas, Acre)
- M. l. nesaea Hübner, [1820] (Brazil: Bahia)
- M. l. ocona Druce, 1876 (Peru)
- M. l. roqueensis Bryk, 1953 (Peru)
- M. l. solaria Forbes, 1948 (Venezuela)
- M. l. utemaia Reakirt, 1866 (Honduras, Mexico)
- M. l. tapajona Freitas & Pona, 2022 (Brasil)
