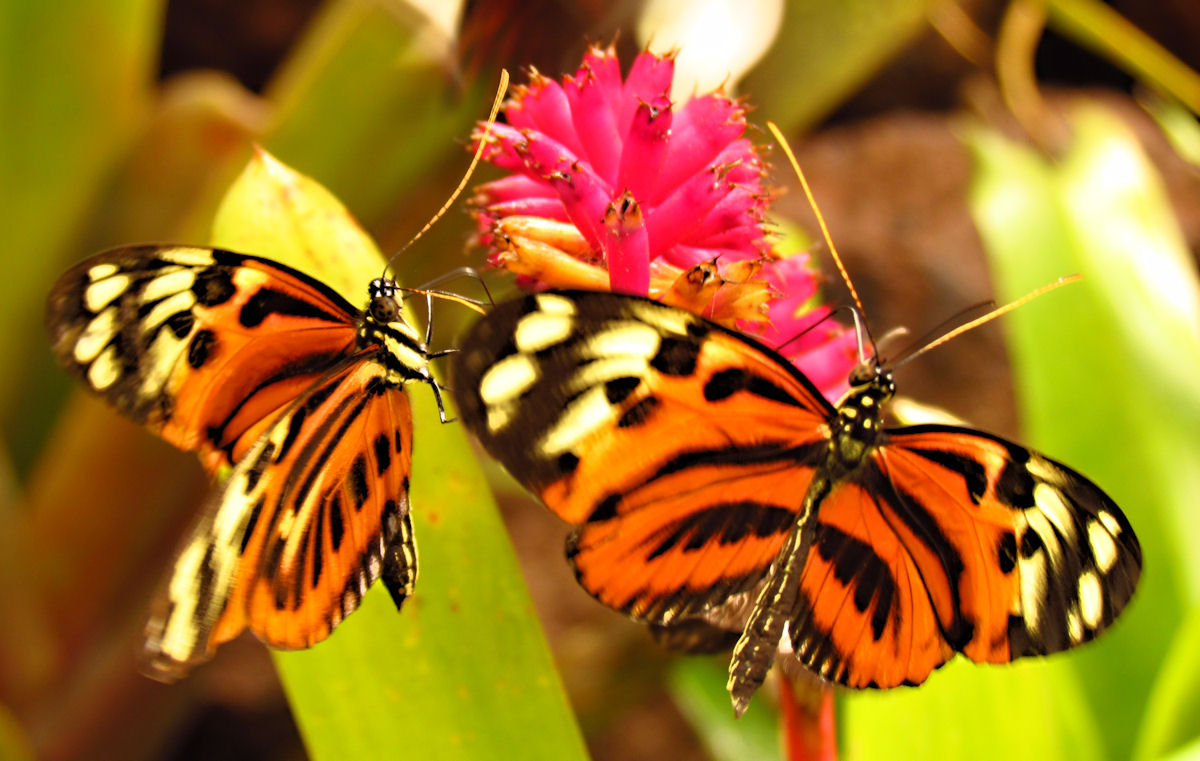
- Dorsal side, Quito, Ecuador
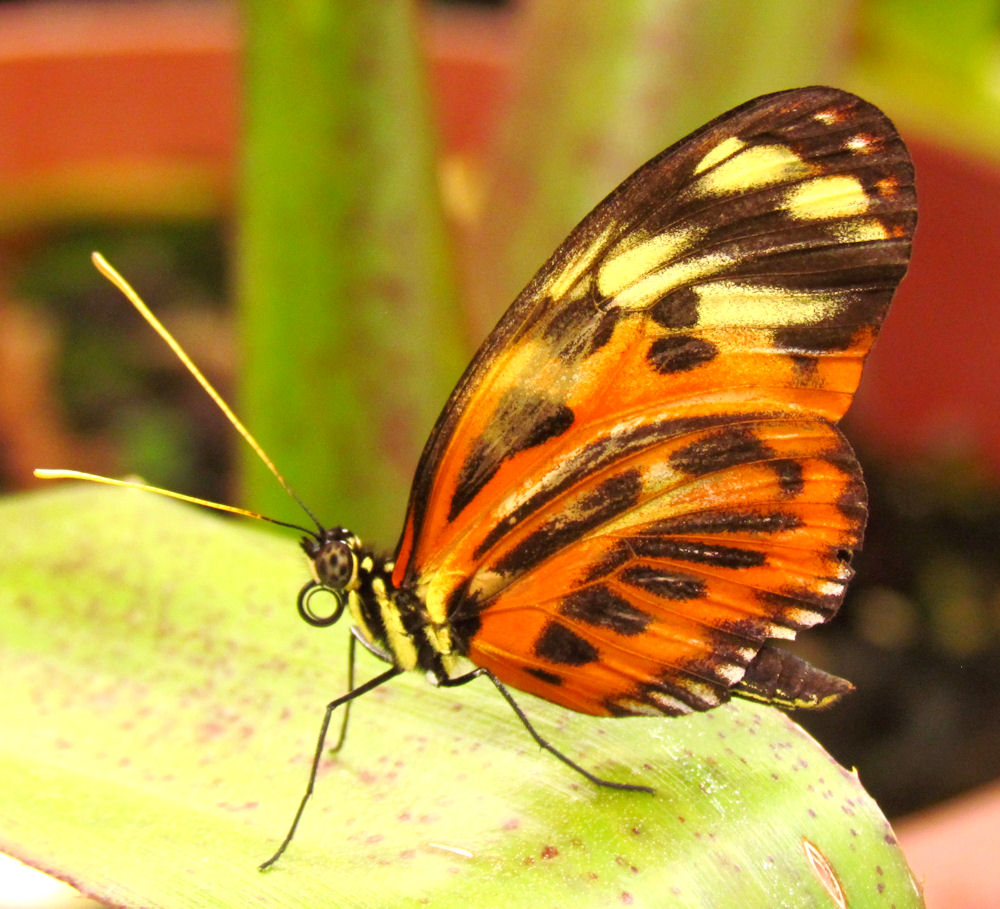
- Ventral side, Quito, Ecuador

Scientific classification
- Kingdom: Animalia
- Phylum: Arthropoda
- Class: Insecta
- Order: Lepidoptera
- Family: Nymphalidae
- Genus: Mechanitis
- Species: M. polymnia

Binomial name
- Mechanitis polymnia (Linnaeus, 1758)

Subspecies
- Many, see text

Synonyms
- Papilio polymnia Linnaeus, 1758; Papilio mopsus Linnaeus, 1758; Mechanitis isthmia Bates, 1863; Mechanitis californica Reakirt, [1866]; Mechanitis ovata Distant, 1876; Mechanitis lycidice Bates, 1864; Mechanitis doryssa Boisduval, 1870; Mechanitis veritabilis Butler, 1873; Mechanitis polymnia sancti-gabrielis Bryk, 1953

= Mechanitis polymnia =

Species of butterfly

Mechanitis polymnia, the orange-spotted tiger clearwing or disturbed tigerwing, is a butterfly of the family Nymphalidae. It is found from Mexico to the Amazon rainforest. The wingspan is 65–75 mm (2.6–3.0 in). The larvae feed on Solanum species.

== Subspecies ==
- M. p. polymnia (Suriname, French Guiana, Brazil)
- M. p. isthmia Bates, 1863 (Mexico, Panama, Costa Rica)
- M. p. chimborazona Bates, 1864 (Ecuador)
- M. p. lycidice Bates, 1864 (Mexico, Guatemala, Honduras)
- M. p. veritabilis Butler, 1873 (Colombia, Venezuela)
- M. p. dorissides Staudinger, [1884] (Peru)
- M. p. casabranca Haensch, 1905 (Brazil (Minas Gerais))
- M. p. eurydice Haensch, 1905 (Peru)
- M. p. caucaensis Haensch, 1909 (Colombia)
- M. p. werneri Hering, 1925 (Colombia)
- M. p. angustifascia Talbot, 1928 (Peru, Brazil)
- M. p. apicenotata Zikán, 1941 (Brazil (Amazonas))
- M. p. mauensis Forbes, 1948 (Brazil (Pará))
- M. p. proceriformis Bryk, 1953 (Peru)
- M. p. bolivarensis Fox, 1967 (Venezuela)
- M. p. kayei Fox, 1967 (Trinidad)
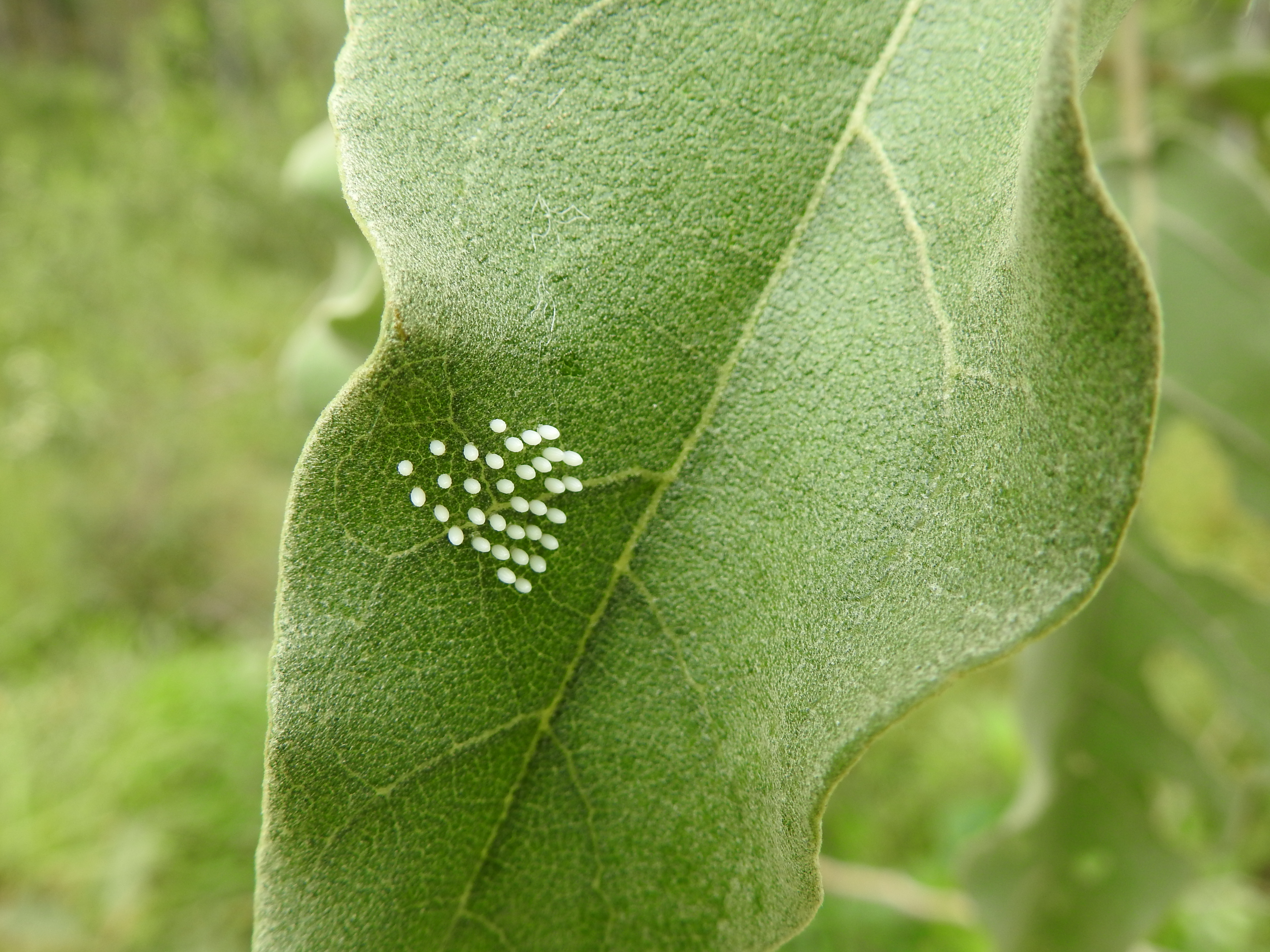
Eggs of M. polymnia

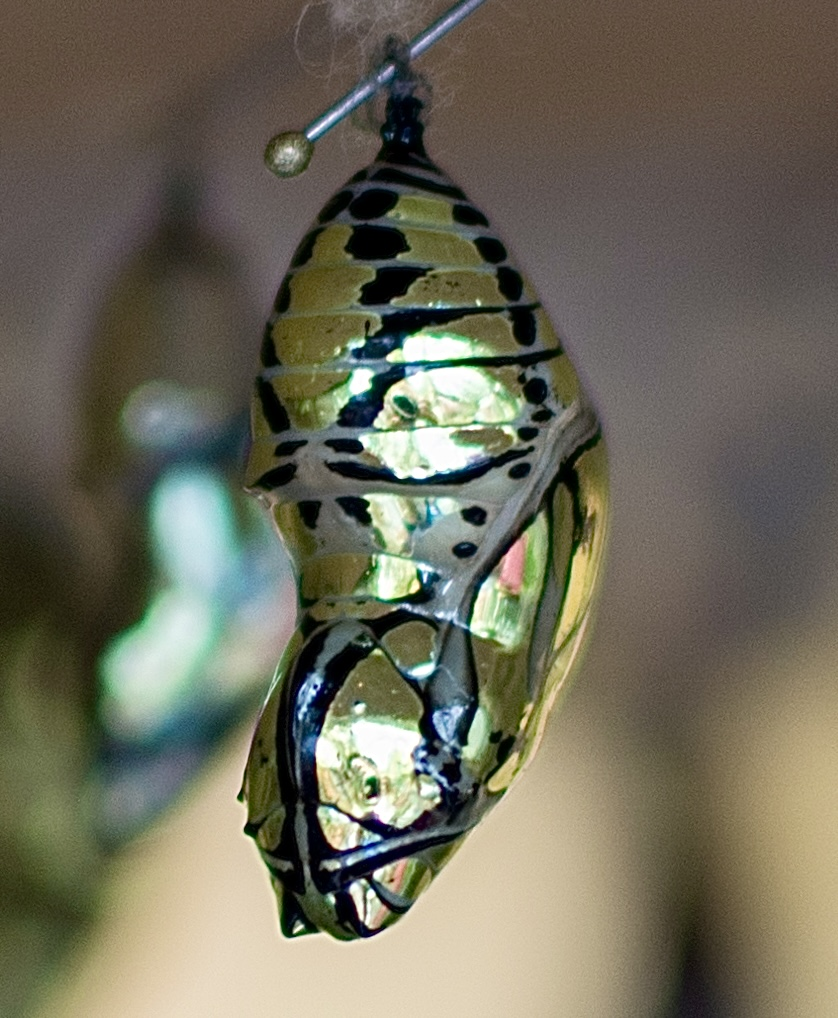
Chrysalis of M. polymnia

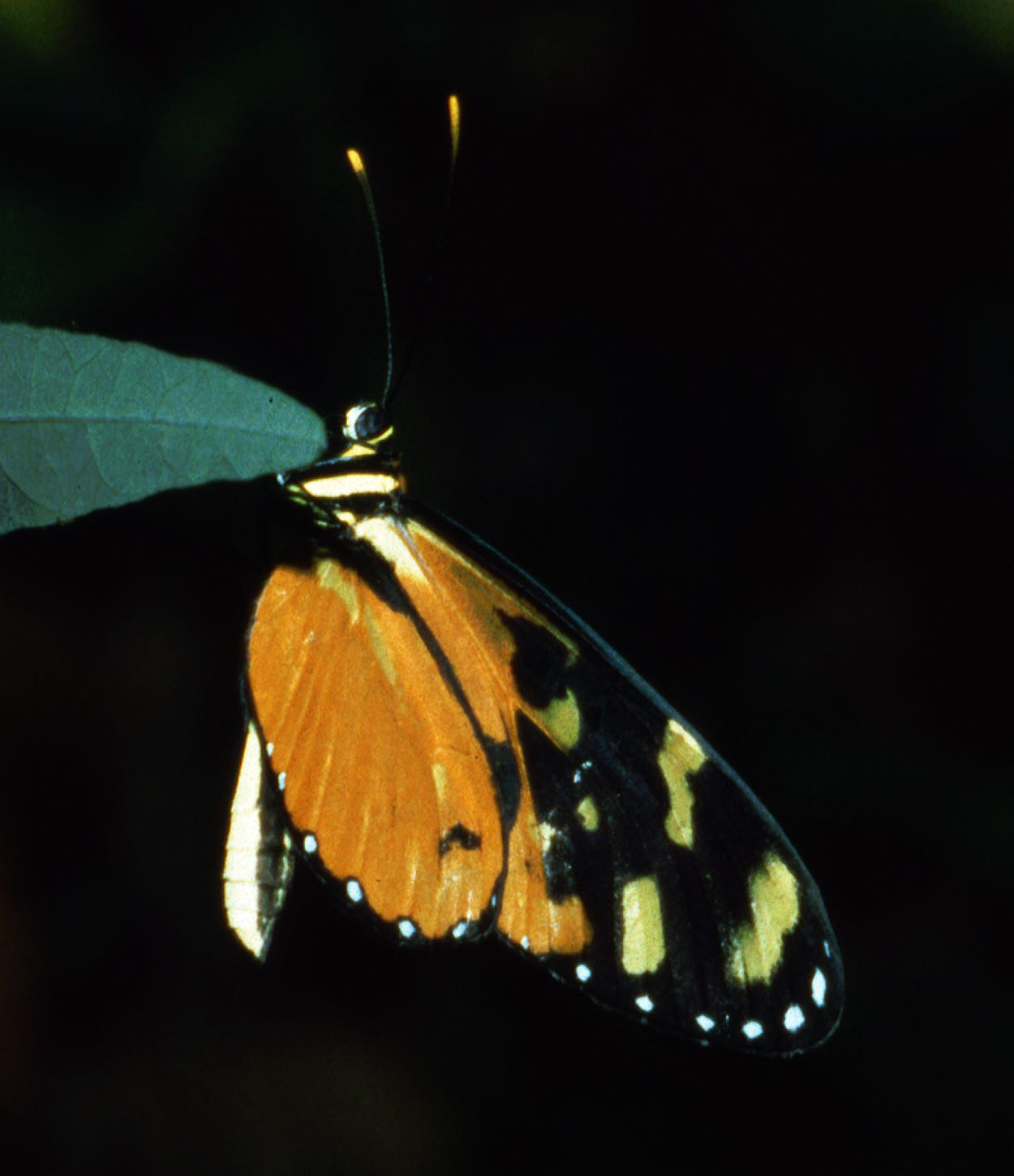
Living specimen

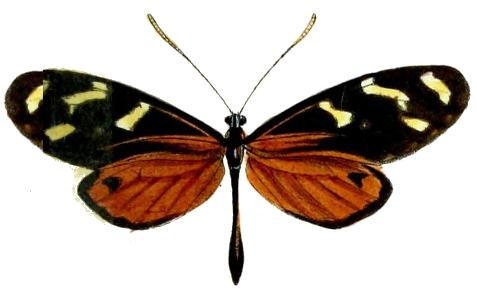
M. p. isthmia

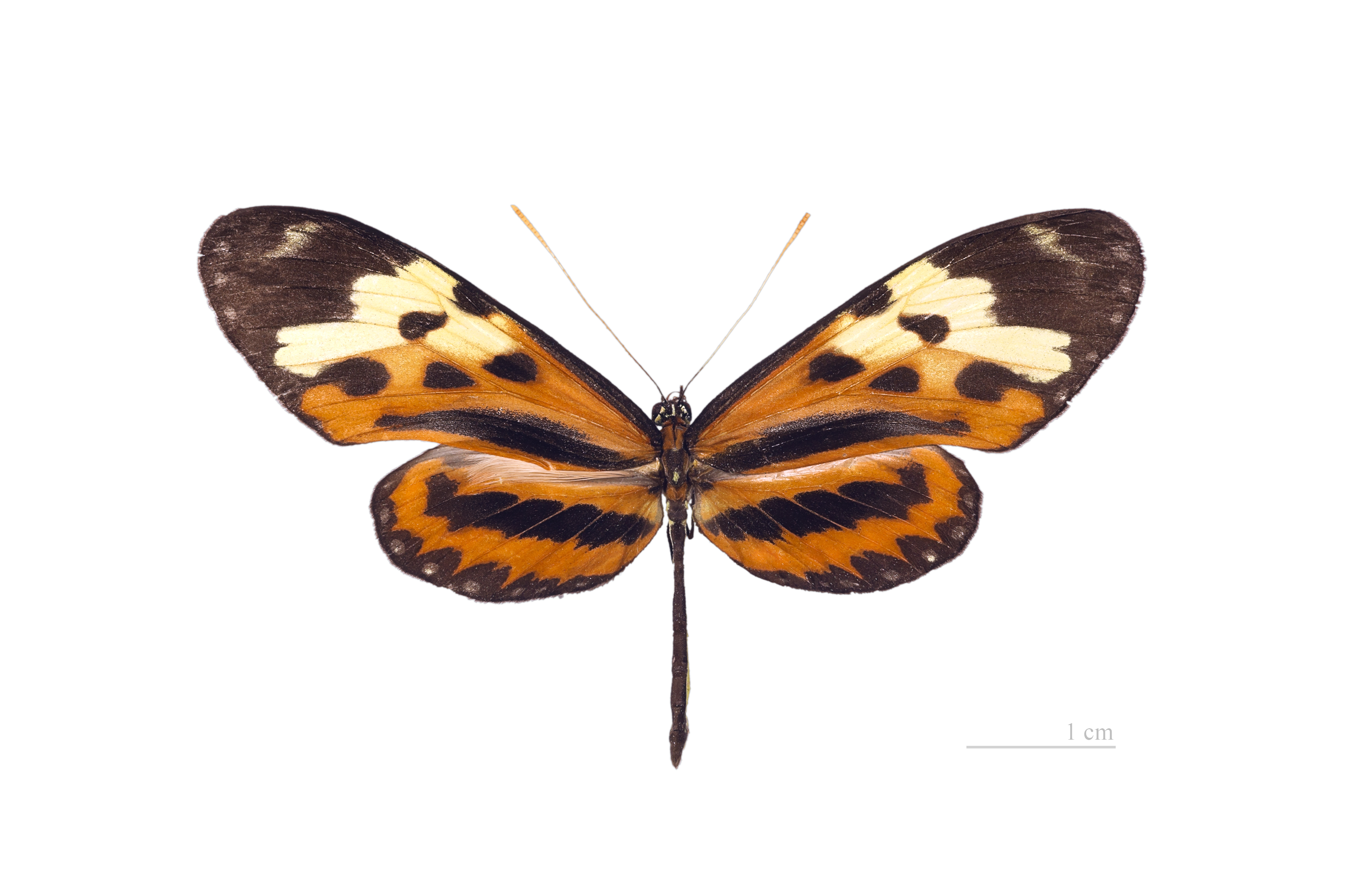
M. p. polymnia - dorsal side

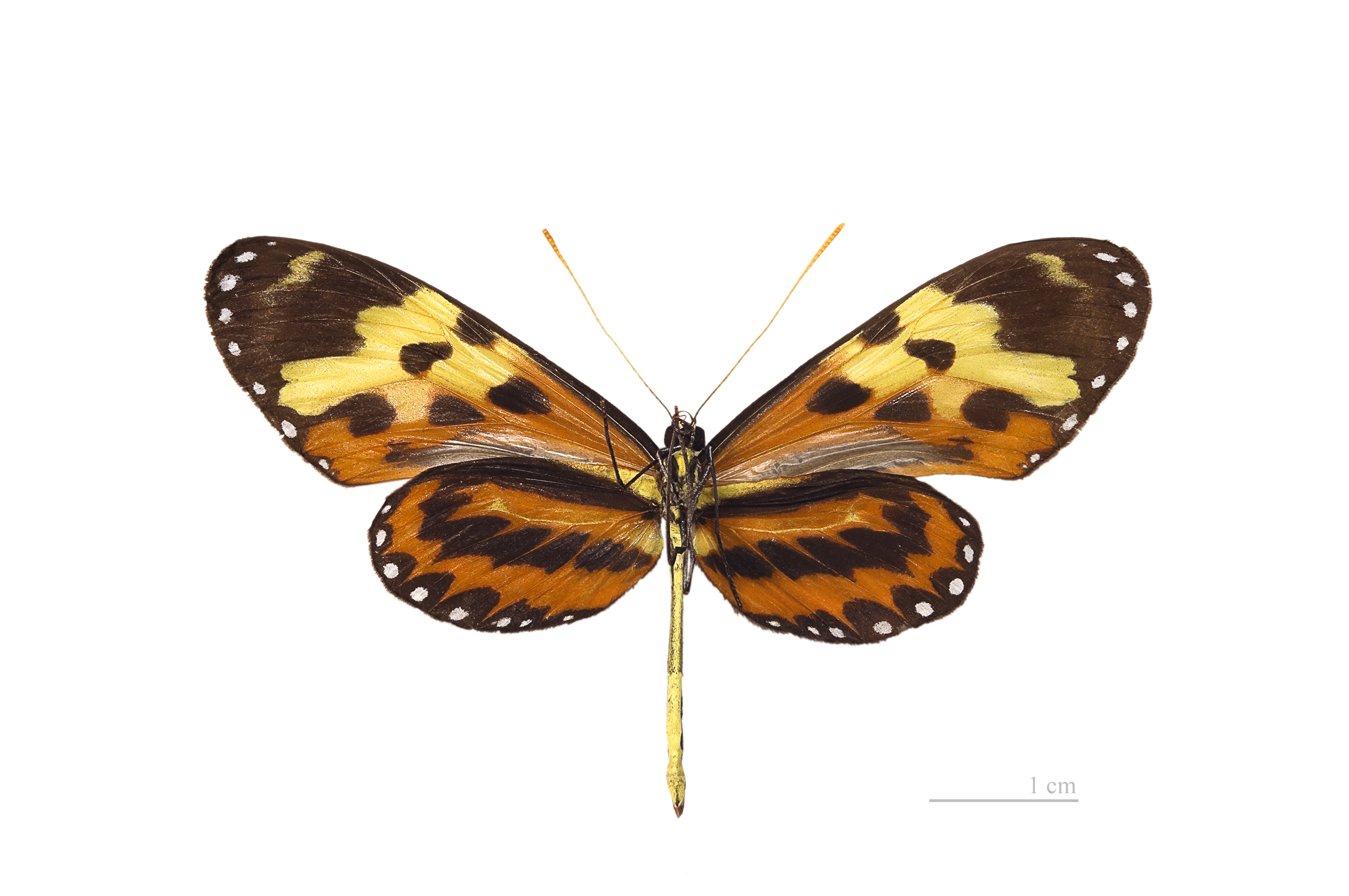
M. p. polymnia - ventral side
