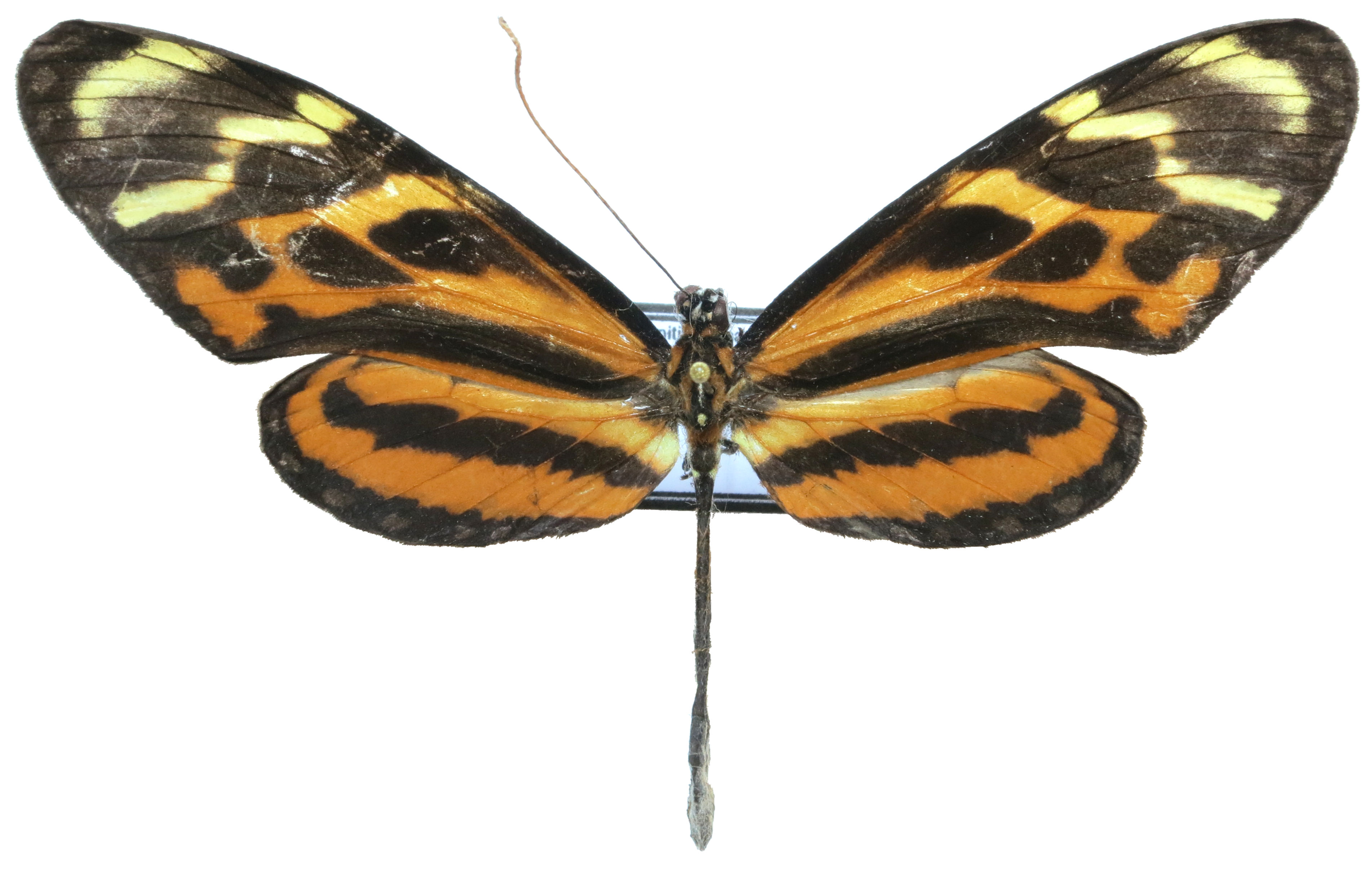
- Mechanitis menapis doryssus - Veracruz, Mexico

Scientific classification
- Domain: Eukaryota
- Kingdom: Animalia
- Phylum: Arthropoda
- Class: Insecta
- Order: Lepidoptera
- Family: Nymphalidae
- Genus: Mechanitis
- Species: M. menapis

Binomial name
- Mechanitis menapis Hewitson, 1856

Synonyms
- Mechanitis franis Reakirt, 1868; Mechanitis menapis var. peruana Hopffer, 1879; Mechanitis doryssus Bates, 1864; Mechanitis doryssus f. saturata ab. escalantei Hoffmann, 1940; Mechanitis mantineus Hewitson, 1869; Mechanitis saturata Godman, [1901]; Mechanitis doryssus var. saturatus

= Mechanitis menapis =

Menapis tigerwing

Species of butterfly

Mechanitis menapis, the Menapis tigerwing or variable tigerwing, is a species of butterfly of the family Nymphalidae. It was described by William Chapman Hewitson in 1856. It is found in South America.

The larvae feed on Solanum species, including S. hispidum and S. torvum.

== Subspecies ==
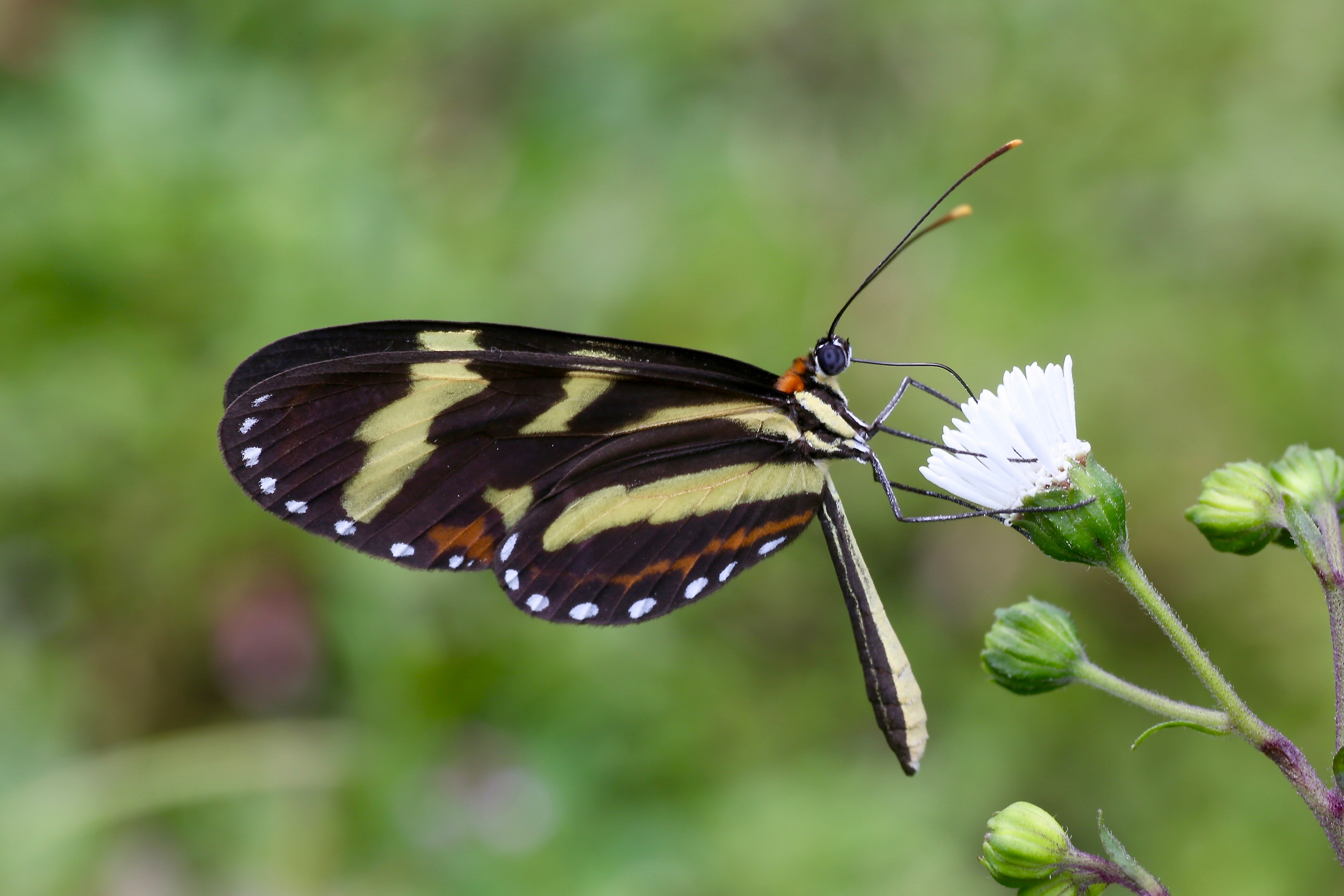
Mechanitis menapis mantineus, Ecuador, Mindo

- M. m. menapis (Colombia)
- M. m. caribensis Fox, 1967 (Venezuela)
- M. m. dariensis Brown, 1977 (Panama)
- M. m. doryssus Bates, 1864 (Guatemala, Mexico, Panama)
- M. m. mantineus Hewitson, 1869 (Ecuador: western Andes)
- M. m. occasiva Fox, 1967 (Colombia)
- M. m. saturata Godman, 1901 (Mexico, Panama, Costa Rica)
