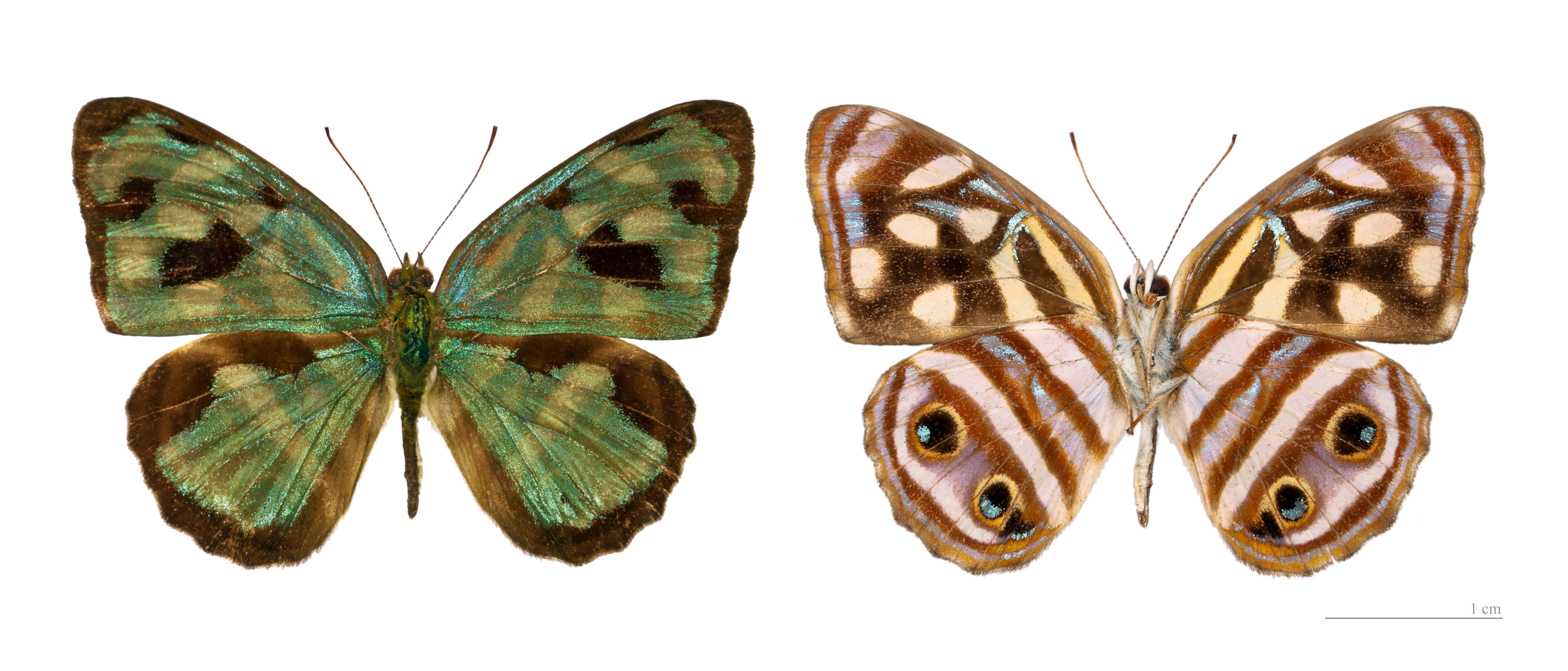
- D. p. postverta male
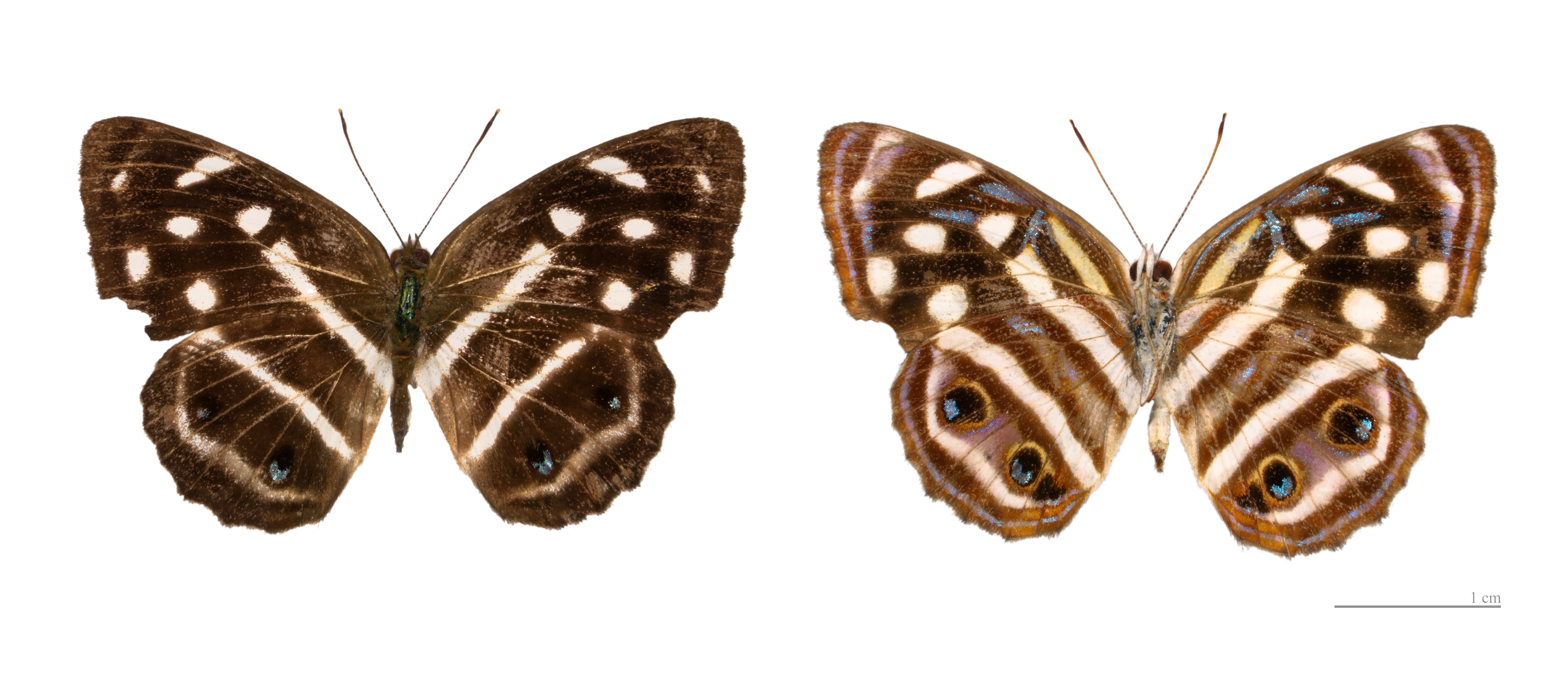
- D. p. postverta female

Scientific classification
- Kingdom: Animalia
- Phylum: Arthropoda
- Class: Insecta
- Order: Lepidoptera
- Family: Nymphalidae
- Genus: Dynamine
- Species: D. postverta

Binomial name
- Dynamine postverta (Cramer, [1780])

Synonyms
- Papilio postverta Cramer, [1780]; Papilio mylitta Cramer, [1780]; Dynamine mylitta f. uniocellata Bryk, 1953; Dynamine mylitta thoenii Anken, 1998; Dynamine postverta mexicana d'Almeida, 1952; Dynamine mylitta ab. bipupillata Röber, 1915

= Dynamine postverta =

Species of butterfly

Dynamine postverta, the Mylitta greenwing or four-spot sailor, is a butterfly in the family Nymphalidae. It is found throughout most tropical and subtropical areas of Central and South America, from Mexico south to Argentina and Paraguay. The habitat includes primary rainforests, humid deciduous woodlands, scrubby grassland and farmland at altitudes up to about 900 metres.

The larvae feed on Dalechampia species.

== Subspecies ==
The following subspecies are recognised:

- D. p. postverta (Surinam, Brazil: Bahia, Minas Gerais)
- D. p. mexicana d'Almeida, 1952 (Mexico, Honduras, Cuba)
