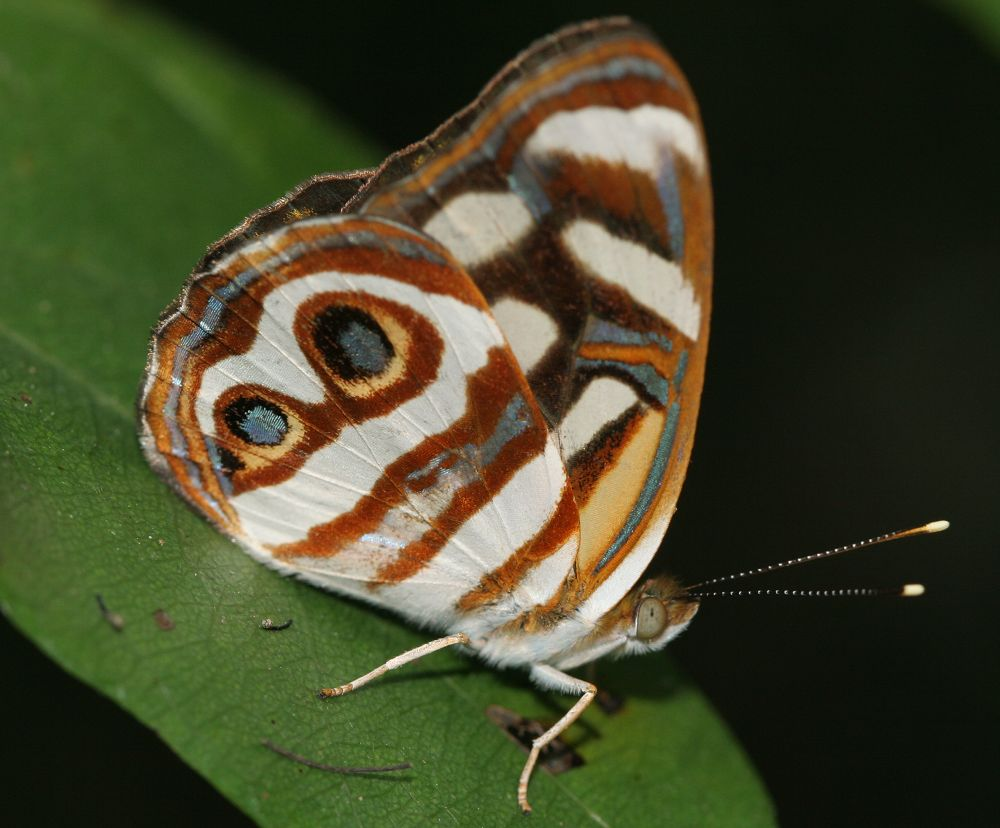

Scientific classification
- Domain: Eukaryota
- Kingdom: Animalia
- Phylum: Arthropoda
- Class: Insecta
- Order: Lepidoptera
- Family: Nymphalidae
- Genus: Dynamine
- Species: D. dyonis

Binomial name
- Dynamine dyonis Geyer, 1837

= Dynamine dyonis =

Species of butterfly

Dynamine dyonis, the blue-eyed sailor, is a species of tropical brushfoot in the butterfly family Nymphalidae. It is found in North America.

The MONA or Hodges number for Dynamine dyonis is 4534.
