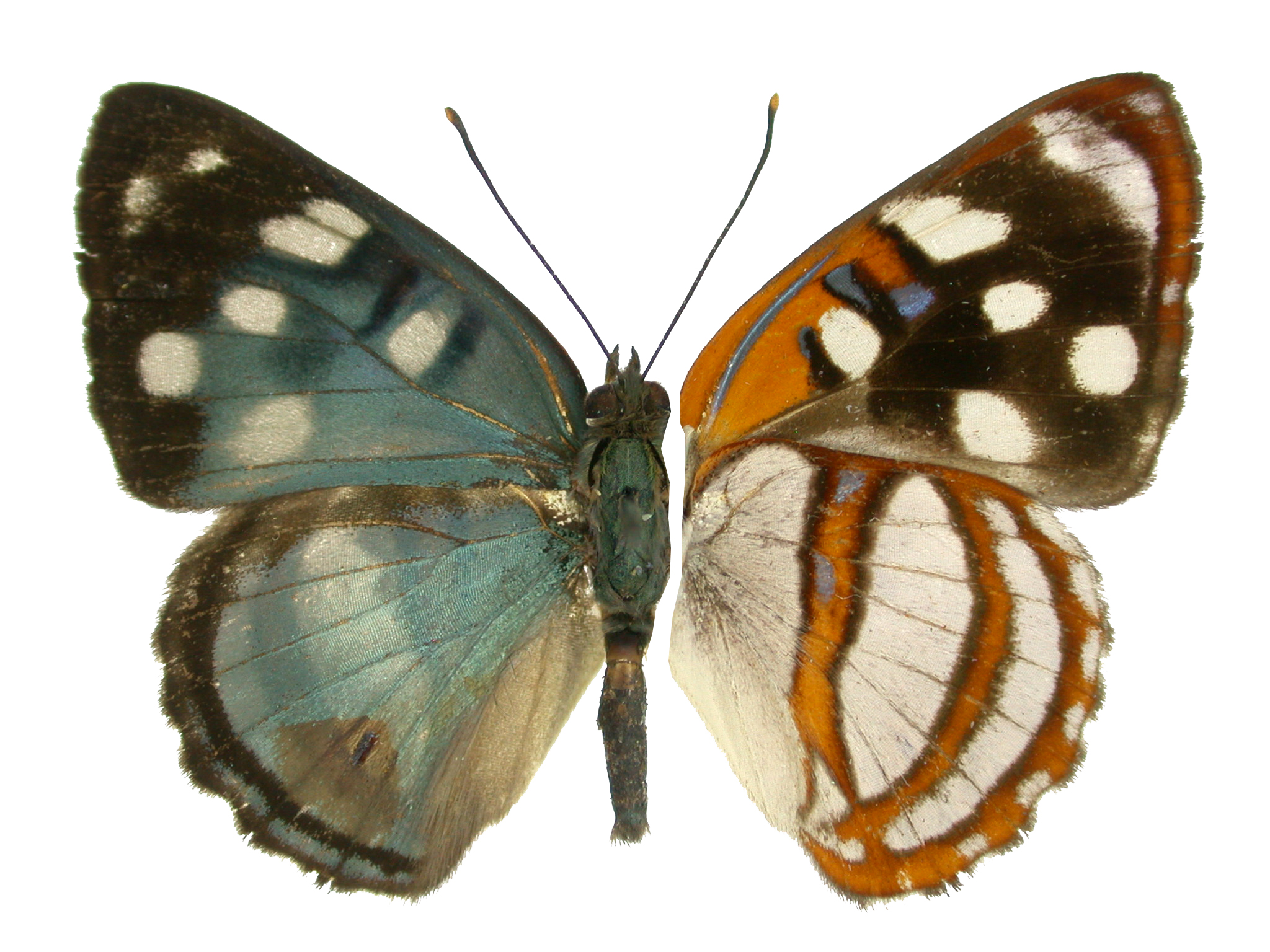

Scientific classification
- Kingdom: Animalia
- Phylum: Arthropoda
- Clade: Pancrustacea
- Class: Insecta
- Order: Lepidoptera
- Family: Nymphalidae
- Genus: Dynamine
- Species: D. racidula

Binomial name
- Dynamine racidula (Hewitson, 1852)

Synonyms
- Eubagis racidula Hewitson, 1852

= Dynamine racidula =

Species of butterfly

Dynamine racidula, the racidula sailor, is a species of butterfly of the family Nymphalidae. It is found in Brazil and Venezuela.

== Subspecies ==
- Dynamine racidula racidula (Brazil: Amazonas)
- Dynamine racidula trembathi Neild, 1996 (Venezuela)
