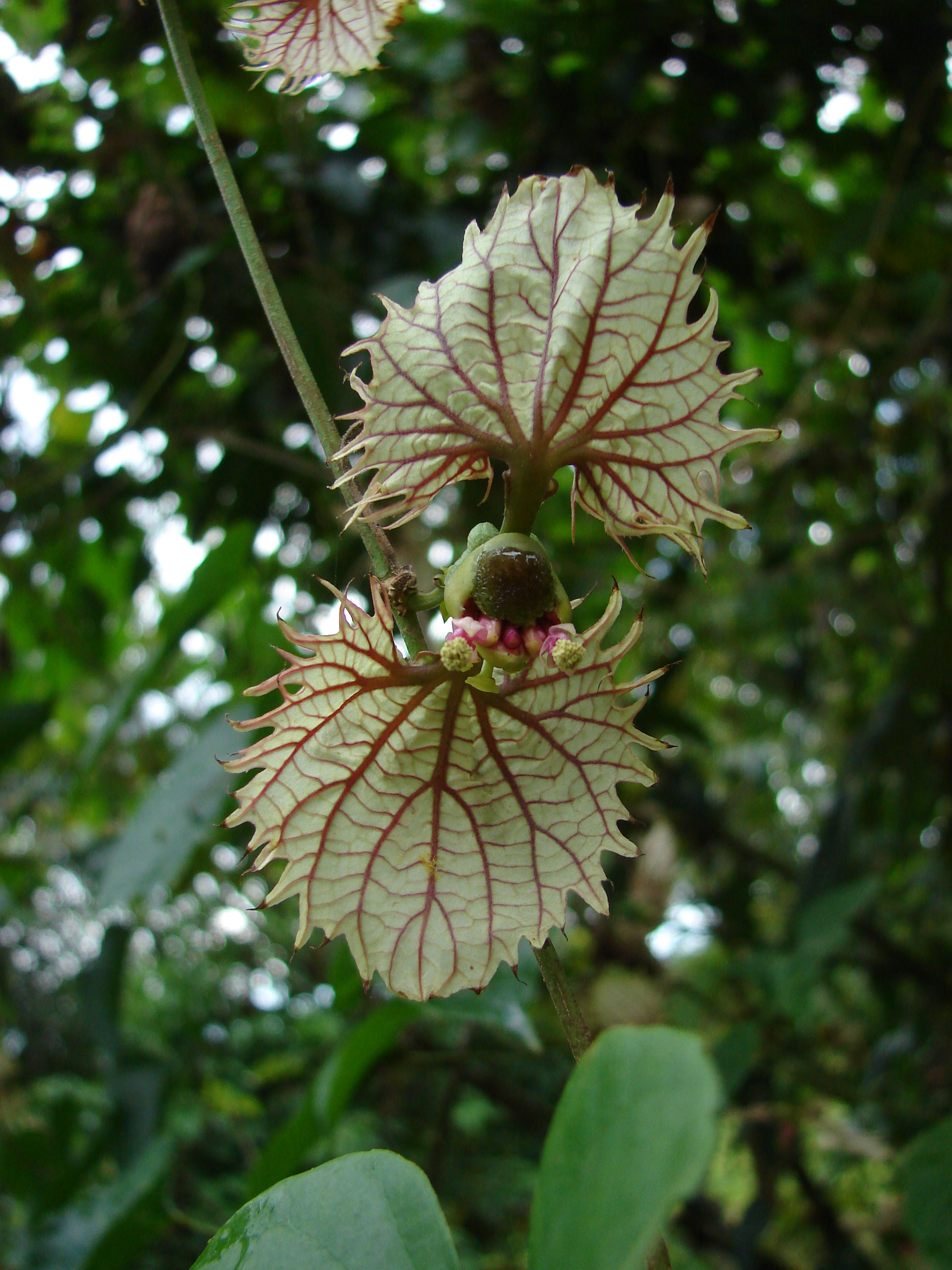

Scientific classification
- Kingdom: Plantae
- Clade: Embryophytes
- Clade: Tracheophytes
- Clade: Angiosperms
- Clade: Eudicots
- Clade: Rosids
- Order: Malpighiales
- Family: Euphorbiaceae
- Genus: Dalechampia
- Species: D. dioscoreifolia

Binomial name
- Dalechampia dioscoreifolia Poepp. 1841 not Pulle 1906

= Dalechampia dioscoreifolia =

Species of flowering plant in the spurge family Euphorbiaceae

Dalechampia dioscoreifolia is a species of plant in the family Euphorbiaceae first described in 1841. It is native to Central America (Costa Rica, Nicaragua, Panama) and northern and western South America (Colombia, Venezuela, French Guiana, northern Brazil, Bolivia, and possibly Ecuador).

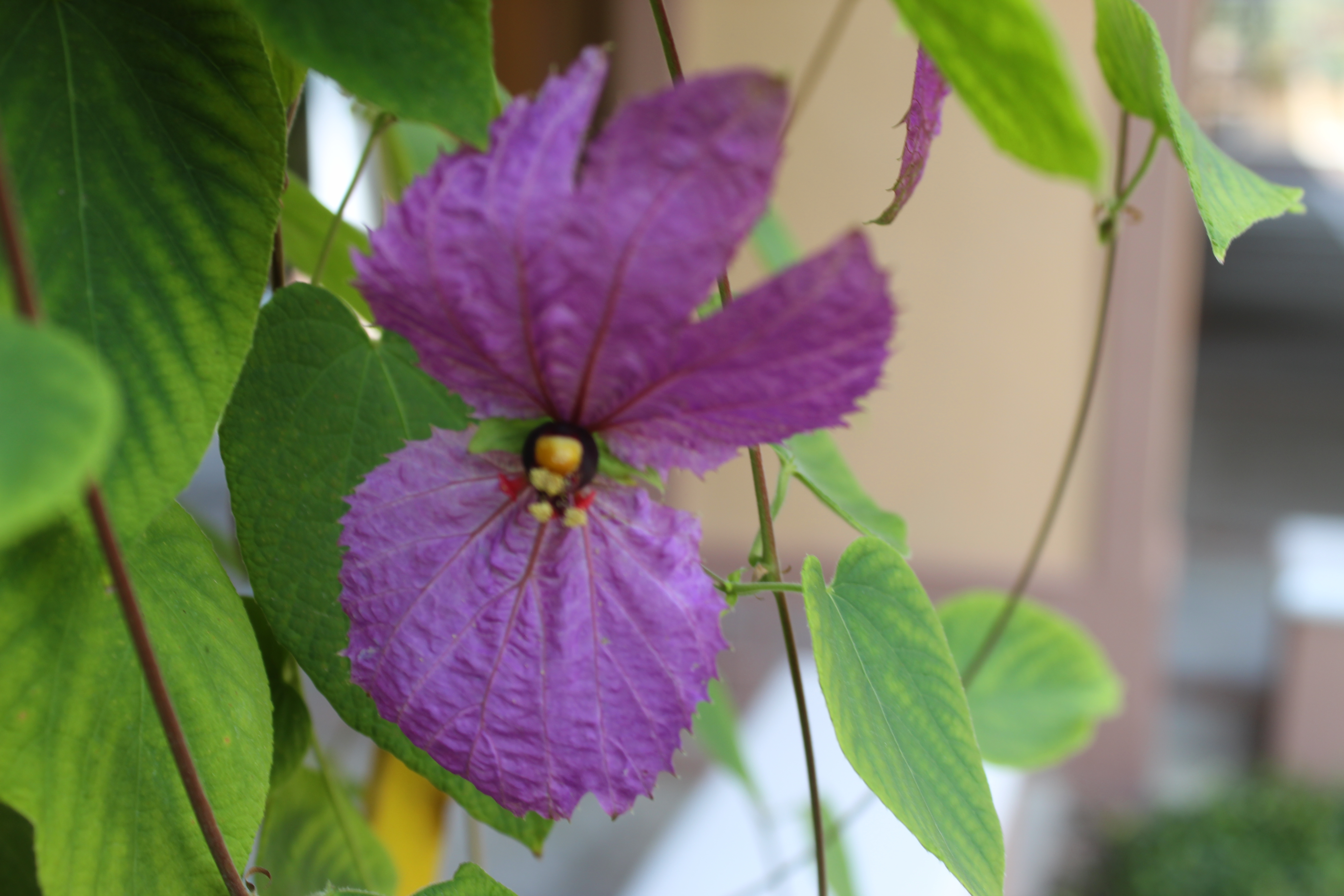
Photo of Dalechampia aristolochiifolia, which is often misidentified as D. dioscoreifolia
