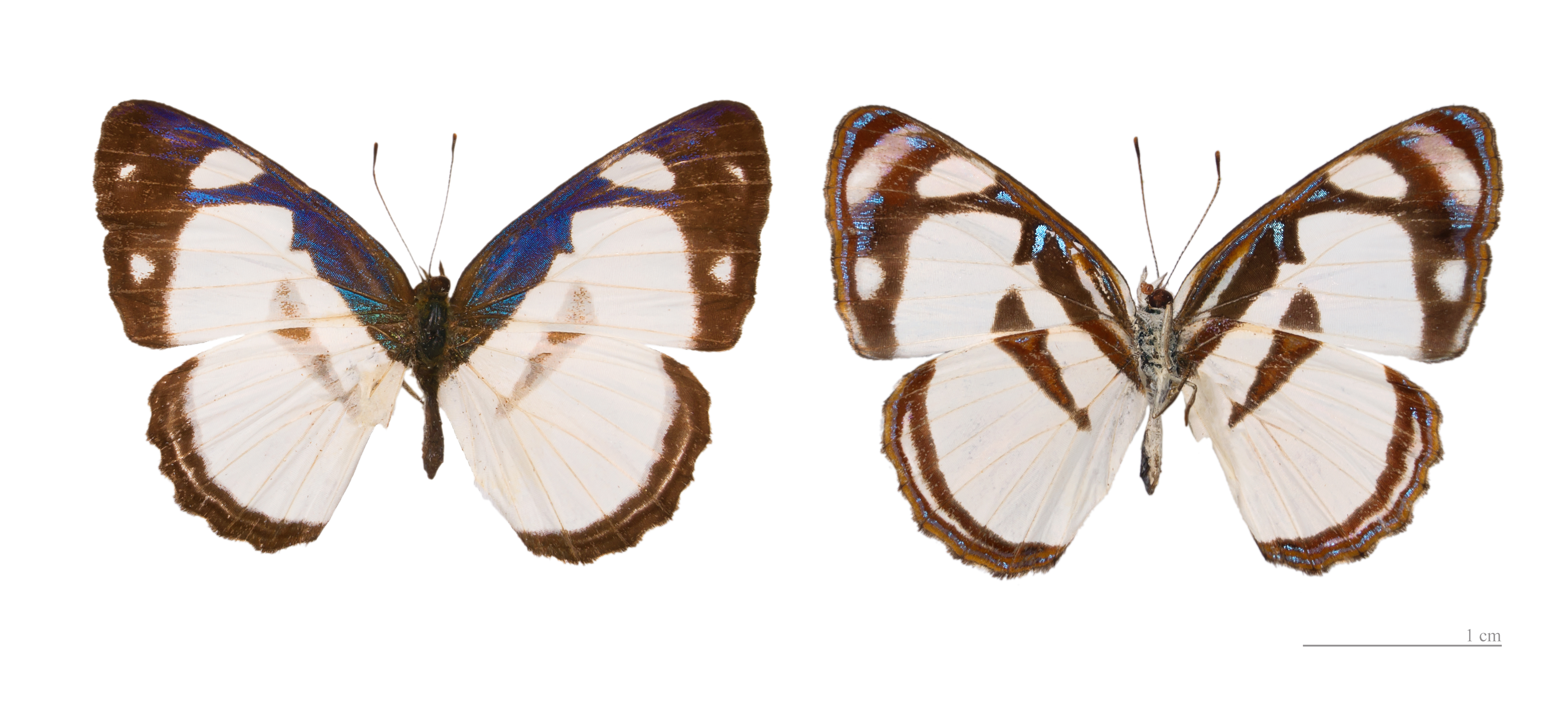

Scientific classification
- Kingdom: Animalia
- Phylum: Arthropoda
- Clade: Pancrustacea
- Class: Insecta
- Order: Lepidoptera
- Family: Nymphalidae
- Genus: Dynamine
- Species: D. athemon

Binomial name
- Dynamine athemon Linnaeus, 1758

Synonyms
- Papilio athemon Linnaeus, 1758

= Dynamine athemon =

Species of butterfly

Dynamine athemon, commonly known as the ghost sailor or exquisite sailor, is a species of butterfly in the family Nymphalidae, specifically within the Biblidinae subfamily. This species has been recorded in Central and South American countries, including Panama, Peru, Paraguay and Brazil .
