= Dynamine gisella =

Scientific classification
- Kingdom: Animalia
- Phylum: Arthropoda
- Clade: Pancrustacea
- Class: Insecta
- Order: Lepidoptera
- Family: Nymphalidae
- Genus: Dynamine
- Species: D. gisella

Binomial name
- Dynamine gisella Hewitson, 1857

Species of butterfly

Dynamine gisella, commonly known as the Gisella sailor, is a small, strikingly colorful species of brush-footed butterfly native to South America. First described by William Chapman Hewitson in 1857, this insect belongs to the genus Dynamine, a group celebrated for the metallic, radiant coloration of its male specimens.
