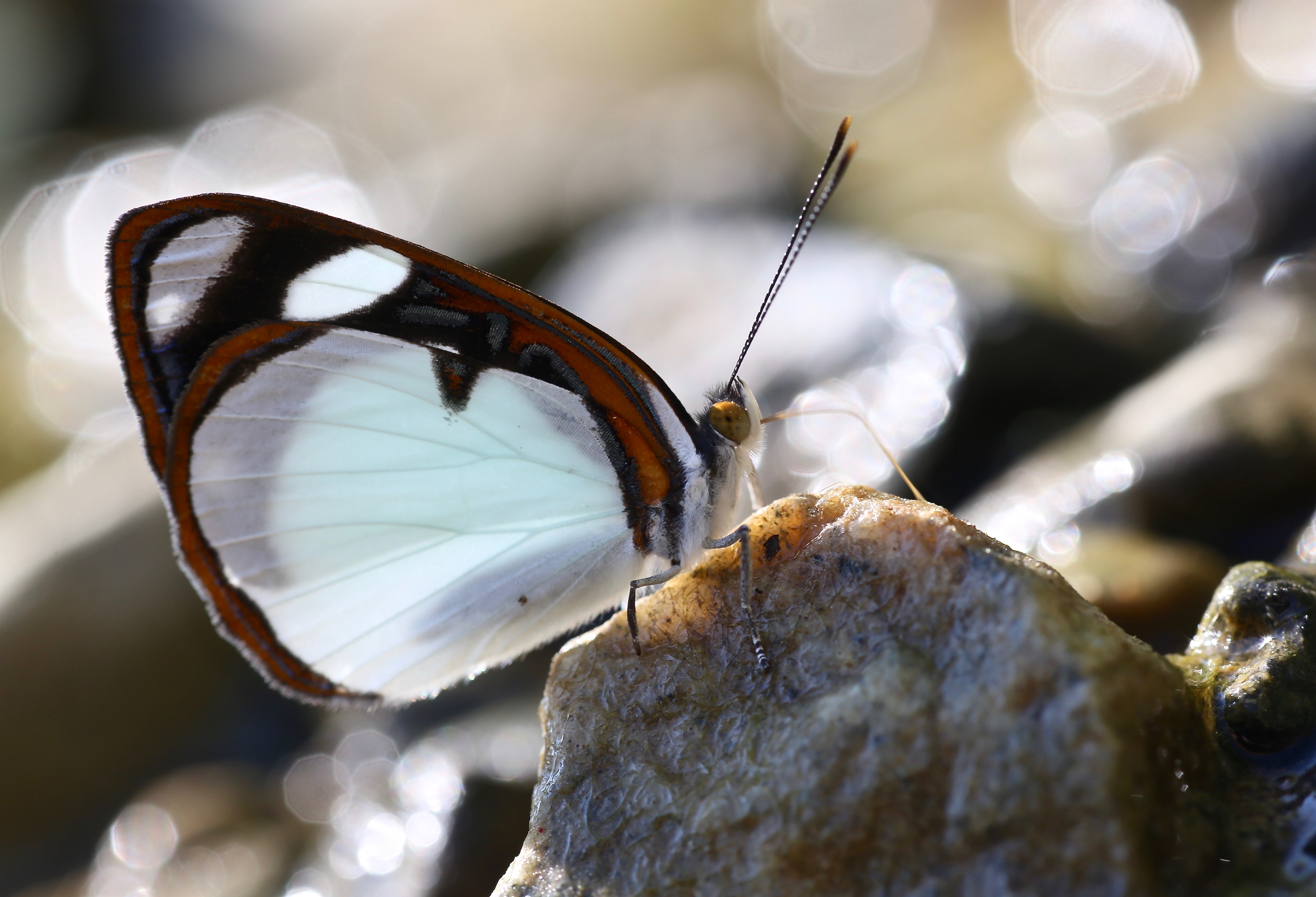

Scientific classification
- Kingdom: Animalia
- Phylum: Arthropoda
- Clade: Pancrustacea
- Class: Insecta
- Order: Lepidoptera
- Family: Nymphalidae
- Genus: Dynamine
- Species: D. anubis

Binomial name
- Dynamine anubis (Hewitson, 1859)

Synonyms
- Eubagis anubis Hewitson, 1859

= Dynamine anubis =

Species of butterfly

Dynamine anubis, commonly known as the Anubis sailor, is a species of nymphalid butterfly found in South America, including regions in Ecuador, Peru, and Brazil. It belongs to the Biblidinae subfamily, often characterized by bright green or bluish-green wing coloration.

== Subspecies ==
- Dynamine anubis anubis (Brazil: Amazonas) Hewitson, 1859
- Dynamine anubis pieridoides C.Felder & R.Felder, 1867
