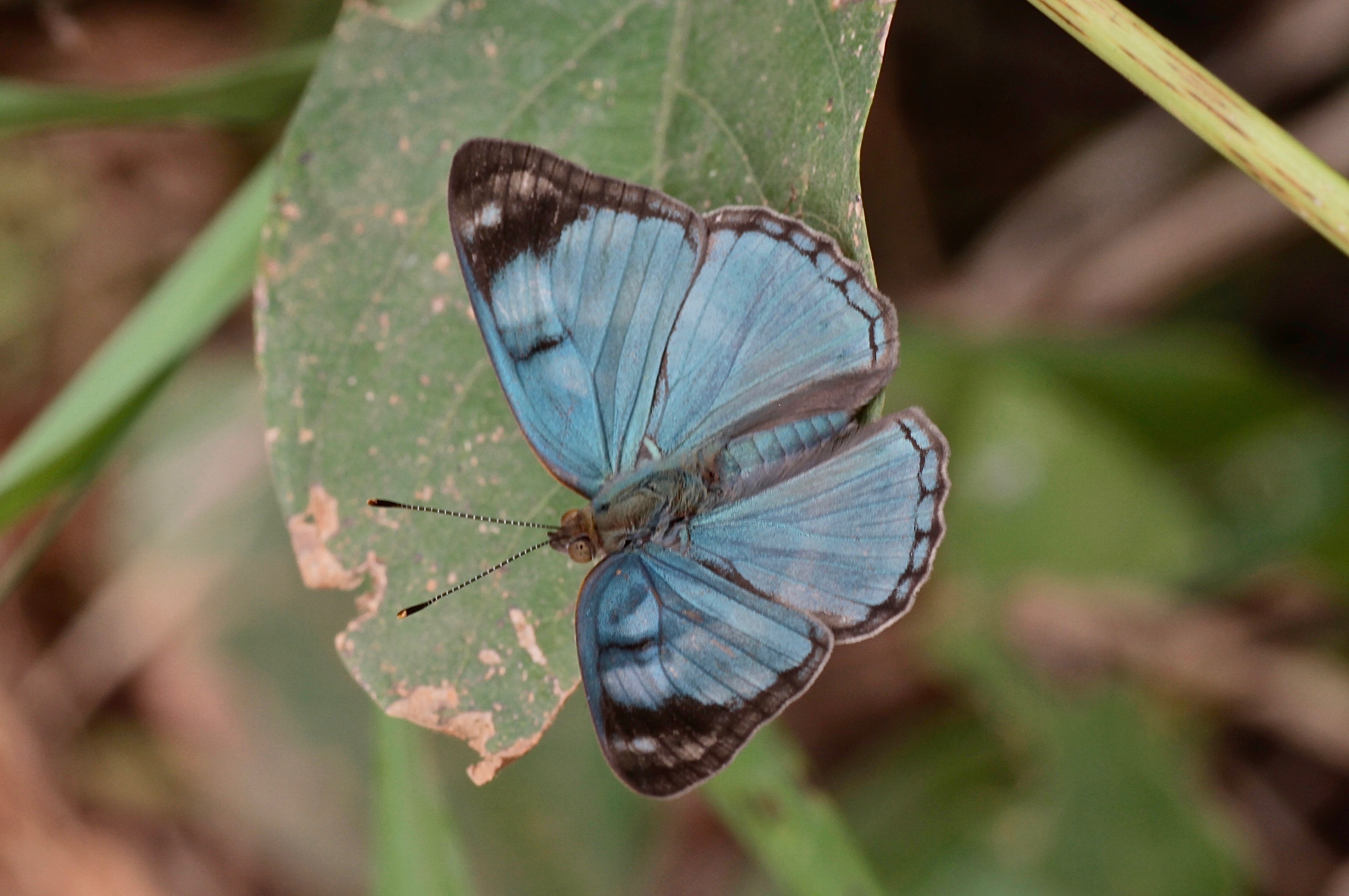

Scientific classification
- Kingdom: Animalia
- Phylum: Arthropoda
- Clade: Pancrustacea
- Class: Insecta
- Order: Lepidoptera
- Family: Nymphalidae
- Genus: Dynamine
- Species: D. arene

Binomial name
- Dynamine arene Hübner, 1816

= Dynamine arene =

Species of butterfly

Dynamine arene, commonly known as the arene greenwing or arene sailor, is a species of brush-footed butterfly in the genus Dynamine, belonging to the family Nymphalidae and subfamily Biblidinae. It is found in the Neotropical region, with records in South America, including countries like Ecuador, Peru, Brazil, Bolivia and Mexico.
