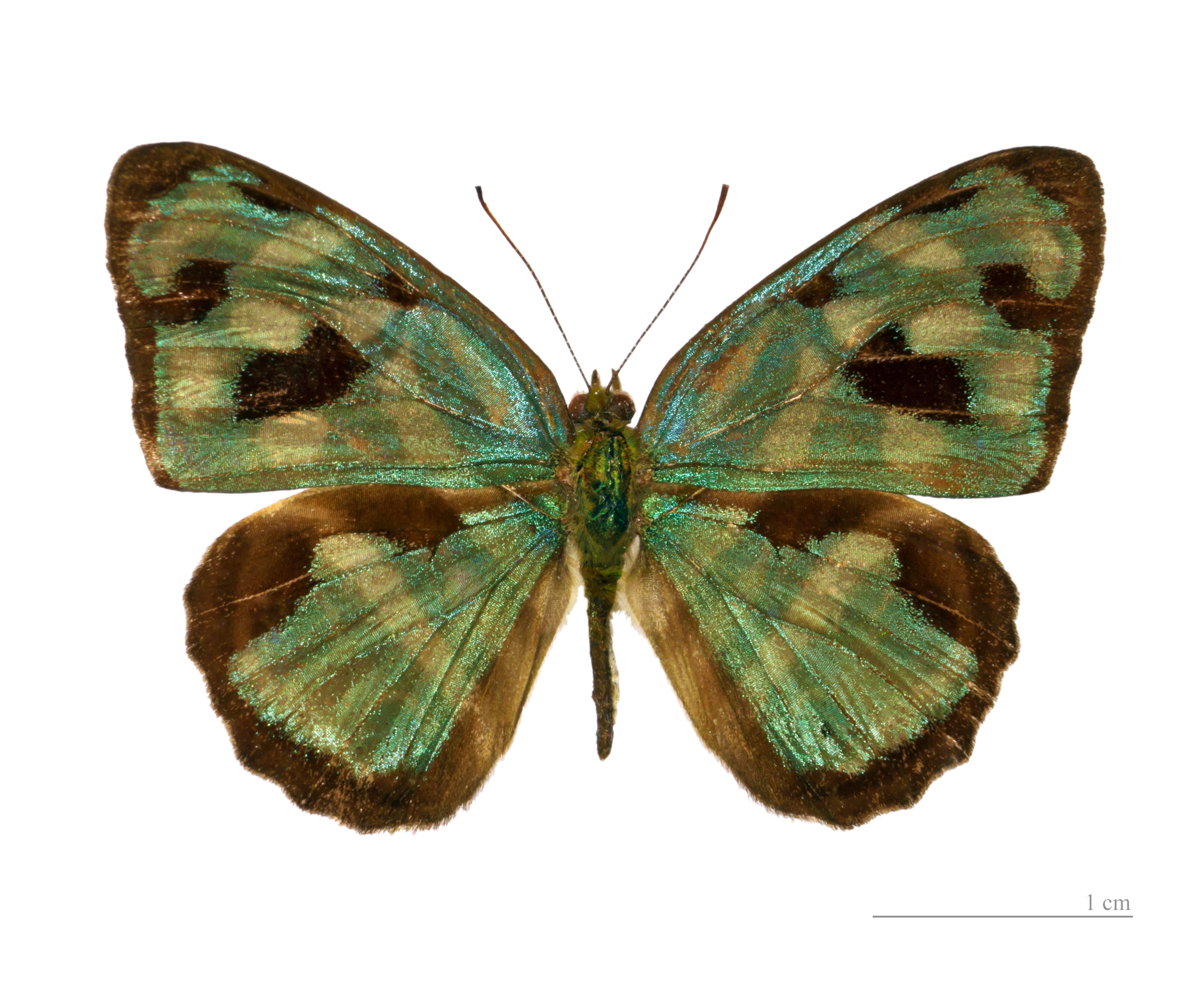
- Dynamine postverta

Scientific classification
- Domain: Eukaryota
- Kingdom: Animalia
- Phylum: Arthropoda
- Class: Insecta
- Order: Lepidoptera
- Family: Nymphalidae
- Tribe: Eubagini
- Genus: Dynamine; Hübner, [1819]

Synonyms
- Sironia Hübner, [1823]; Eubagis Boisduval, [1832]; Arisba Doubleday, 1847

= Dynamine =

Genus of brush-footed butterflies

Dynamine is a genus of nymphalid butterflies found in South America.

== Species ==
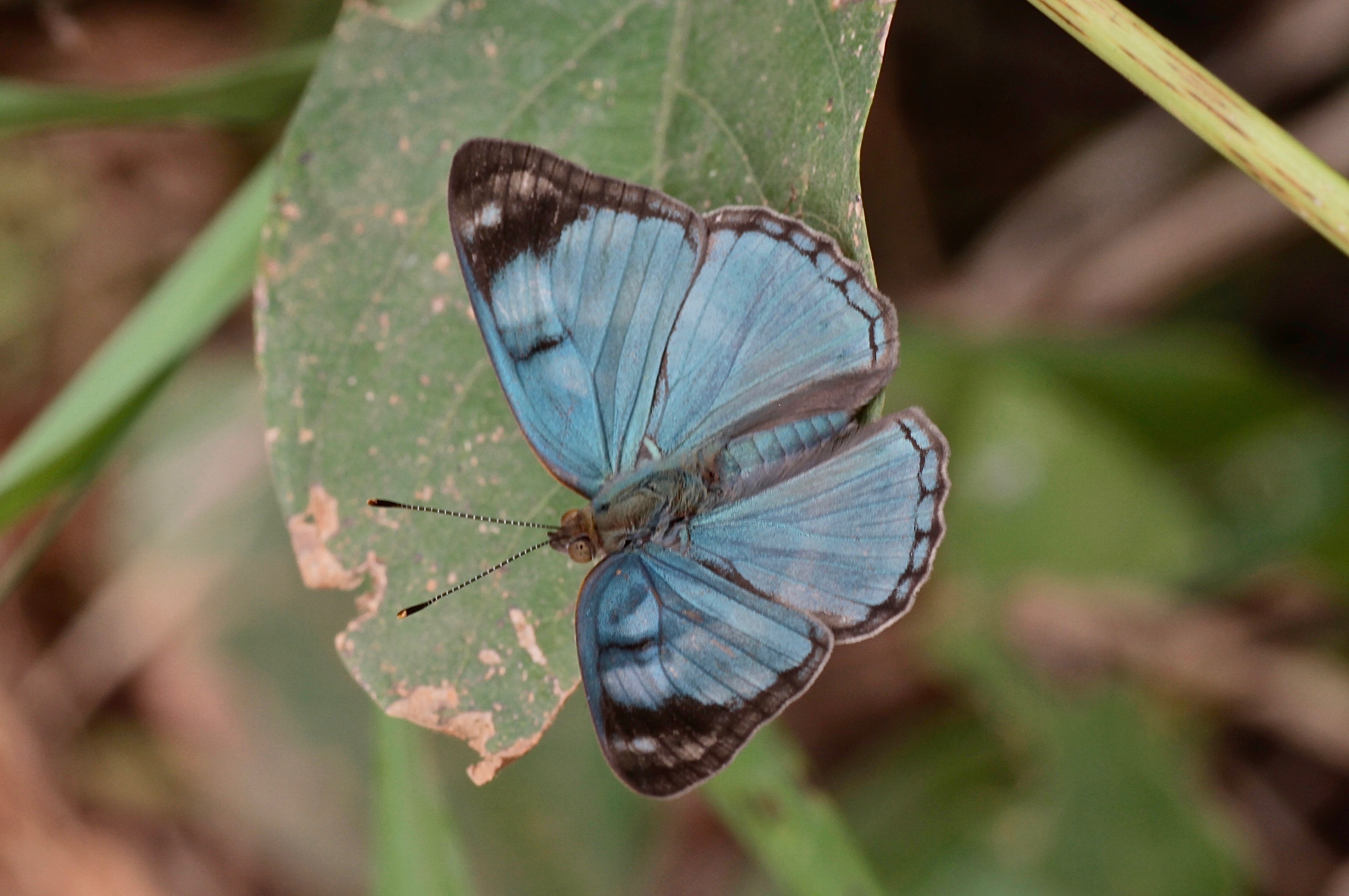
Dynamine arene, Venezuela, Caura river

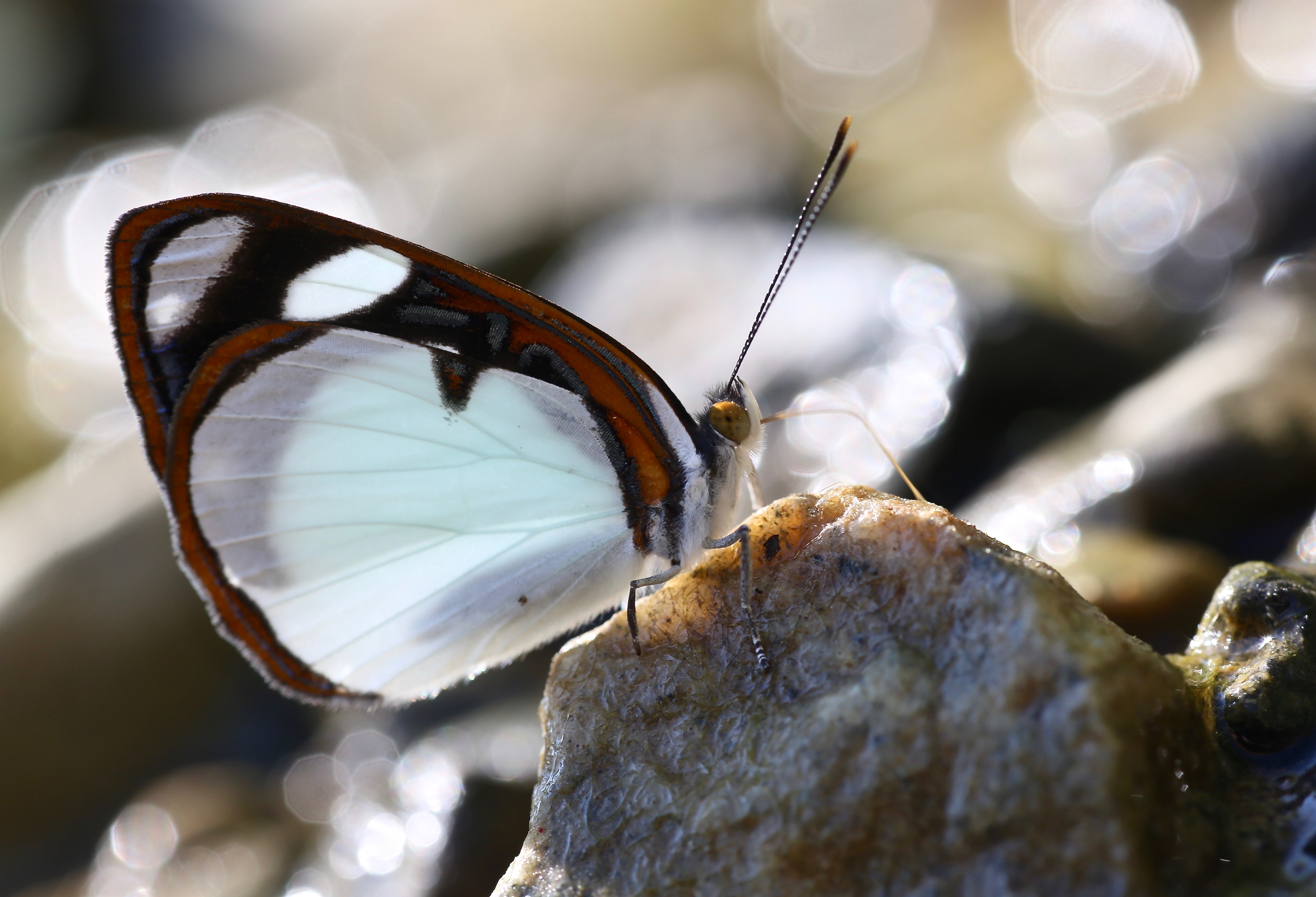
Dynamine anubis, Ecuador, Puerto Misahuallí

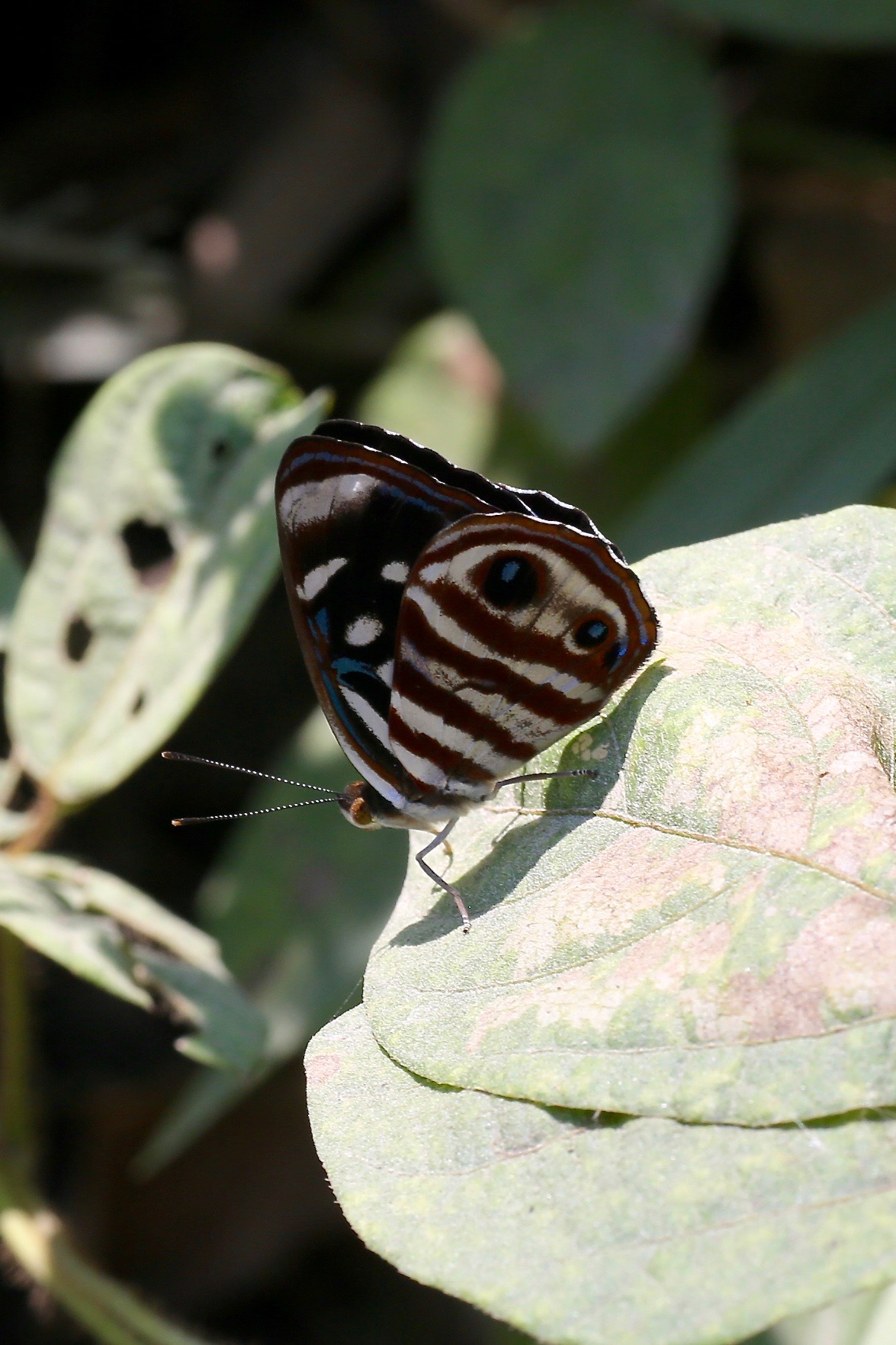
Dynamine gisella, Ecuador, Puerto Misahuallí

Listed alphabetically:

- Dynamine aerata (Butler, 1877)
- Dynamine agacles (Dalman, 1823)
- Dynamine agatha (Oberthür, 1916)
- Dynamine amplias (Hewitson, 1859)
- Dynamine anubis (Hewitson, 1859)
- Dynamine arene Hübner, [1823]
- Dynamine artemisia (Fabricius, 1793)
- Dynamine ate (Godman & Salvin, [1883])
- Dynamine athemon (Linnaeus, 1758)
- Dynamine chryseis (Bates, 1865)
- Dynamine coenus (Fabricius, 1793)
- Dynamine colombiana Talbot, 1932
- Dynamine davinae Brévignon, 2008
- Dynamine dyonis Geyer, 1837
- Dynamine erchia (Hewitson, 1852)
- Dynamine gisella (Hewitson, 1857)
- Dynamine haenschi Hall, 1917
- Dynamine hecuba (Schaus, 1913)
- Dynamine ines (Godart, [1824])
- Dynamine intermedia Talbot, 1932
- Dynamine laugieri (Oberthür, 1916)
- Dynamine meridionalis Röber, 1915
- Dynamine myrrhina (Doubleday, 1849)
- Dynamine myrson (Doubleday, 1849)
- Dynamine neoris (Hewitson, 1859)
- Dynamine onias (Hewitson, 1857)
- Dynamine paulina (Bates, 1865)
- Dynamine pebana Staudinger, [1885]
- Dynamine perpetua (Bates, 1865)
- Dynamine persis (Hewitson, 1859)
- Dynamine postverta (Cramer, [1780])
- Dynamine racidula (Hewitson, 1852)
- Dynamine sara (Bates, 1865)
- Dynamine serina (Fabricius, 1775)
- Dynamine setabis (Doubleday, 1849)
- Dynamine sosthenes (Hewitson, 1869)
- Dynamine theseus (C. & R. Felder, 1861)
- Dynamine tithia (Hübner, [1823])
- Dynamine vicaria (Bates, 1865)
- Dynamine zenobia (Bates, 1865)
