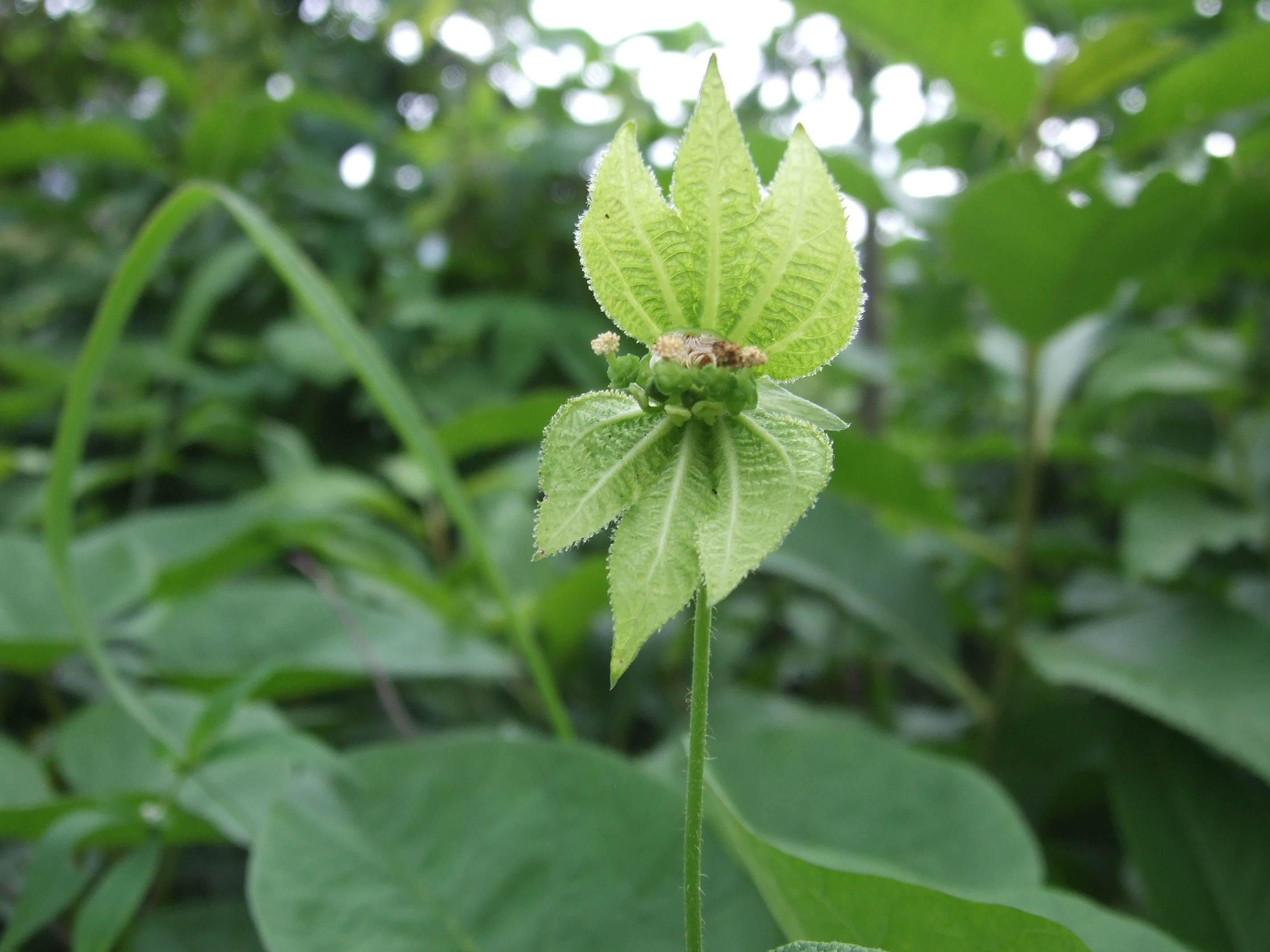
- Dalechampia scandens, Ecuador

Scientific classification
- Kingdom: Plantae
- Clade: Tracheophytes
- Clade: Angiosperms
- Clade: Eudicots
- Clade: Rosids
- Order: Malpighiales
- Family: Euphorbiaceae
- Subfamily: Acalyphoideae
- Tribe: Plukenetieae
- Subtribe: Dalechampiinae
- Genus: Dalechampia; L. 1753

Synonyms
- Cremophyllum Scheidw.; Dalechampsia Post & Kuntze; Megalostylis S.Moore; Rhopalostylis Klotzsch ex Baill.

= Dalechampia =

Genus of flowering plants in the spurge family Euphorbiaceae

Dalechampia is a genus of plant of the family Euphorbiaceae and of the monogeneric subtribe Dalechampiinae. It is widespread across lowland tropical areas (generally below 2,000 m ASL) primarily in the Americas with smaller numbers of species in Africa, Madagascar, and southern Asia. Additional new species are still being described and several are very rare and at risk of extinction.

Dalechampia has unisexual flowers that are secondarily united into bisexual blossoms (pseudanthia), which act as the pollination units. The pollination and floral evolution of this genus have been studied more intensively than perhaps any other member of the euphorbia family. In the neotropics (Americas), most species are pollinated by resin-collecting female bees, including euglossine bees and Hypanthidium of the Megachilidae, which use resin in nest construction. About a dozen neotropical species (including D. spathulata, shown below) are pollinated by fragrance-collecting male euglossine bees, which use these fragrances to attract females for mating. There are at least three independent pollination shifts from pollination by female resin-collecting bees to pollination by male fragrance-collecting bees. African and Asian species are also pollinated by resin-collecting megachilid bees, but Malagasy species are pollinated by pollen-feeding beetles and pollen-collecting bees.

Two species are of horticultural interest, D. spathulata and D. aristolochiifolia, have particularly showy blossoms with bright pink/purple bracts. Dalechampia aristolochiifolia, from Peru, has become very popular recently, but it is mistakenly advertised and distributed under the name D. dioscoreifolia.

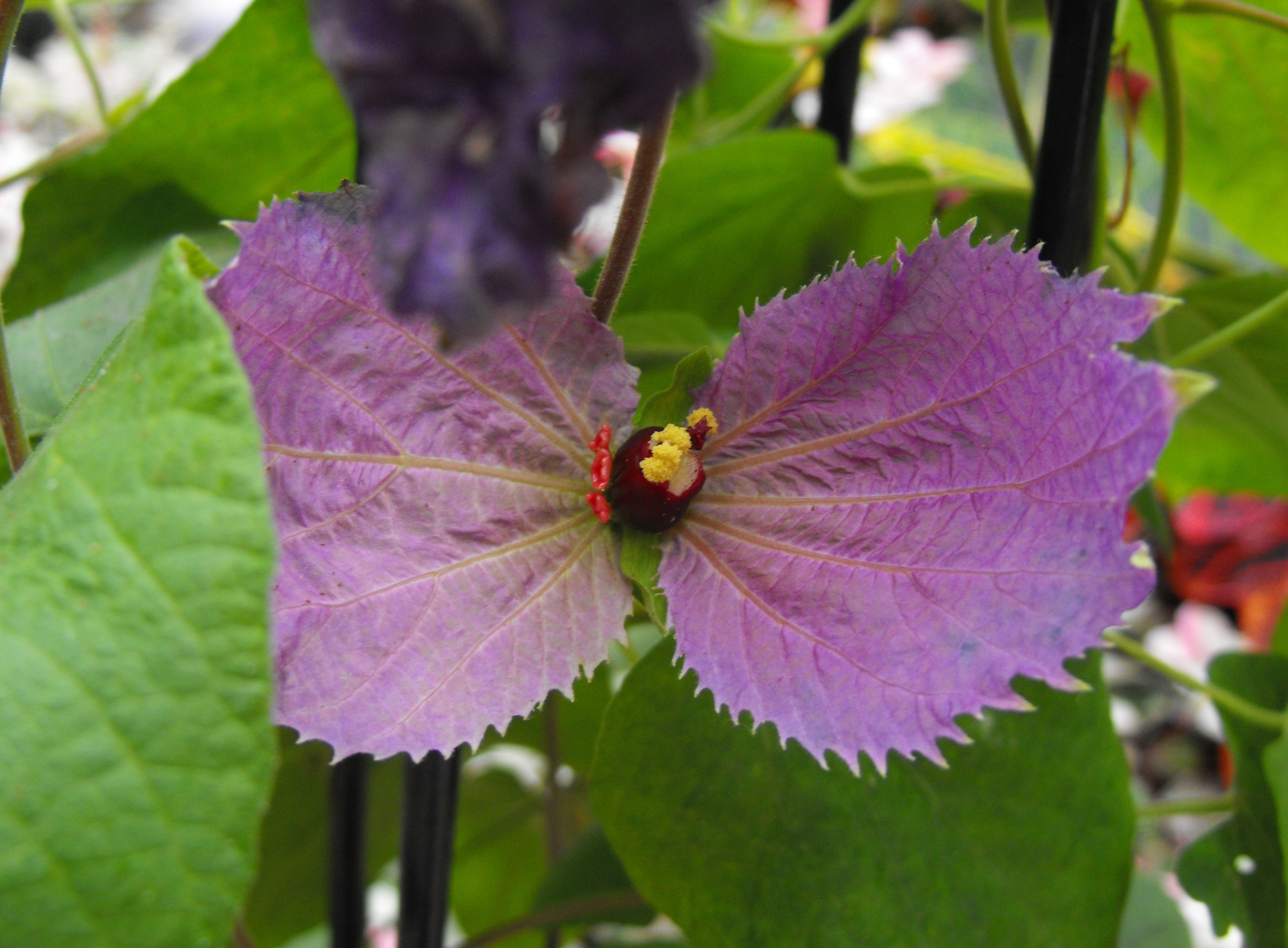
Dalechampia aristolochiifolia

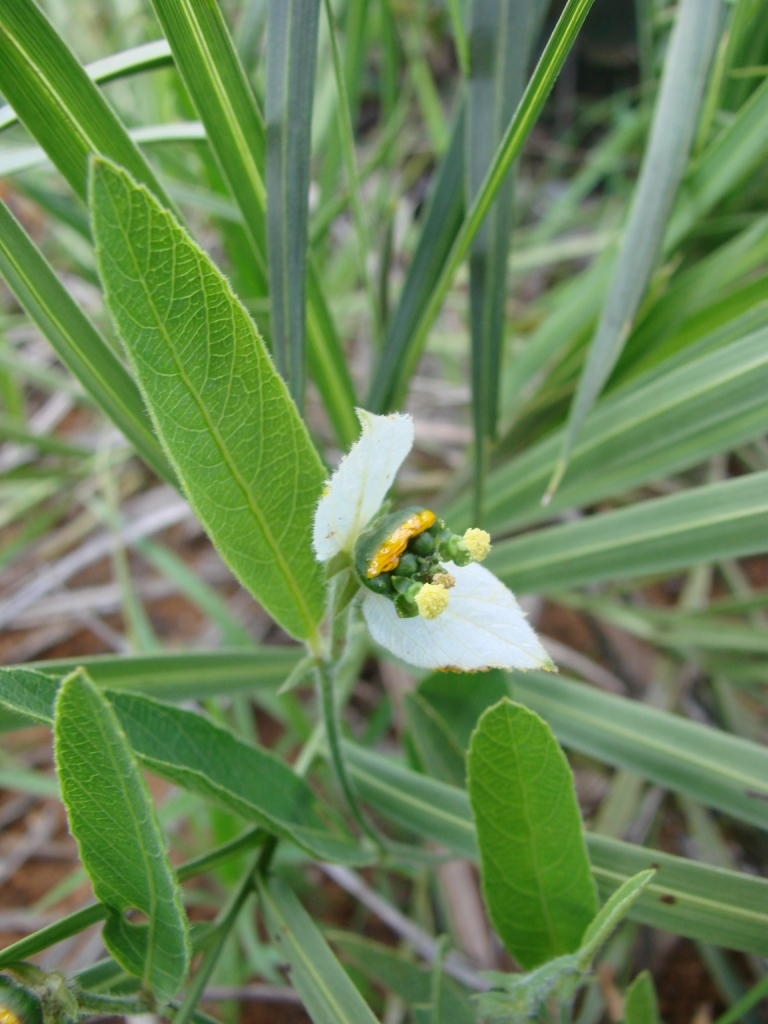
Dalechampia caperonioides

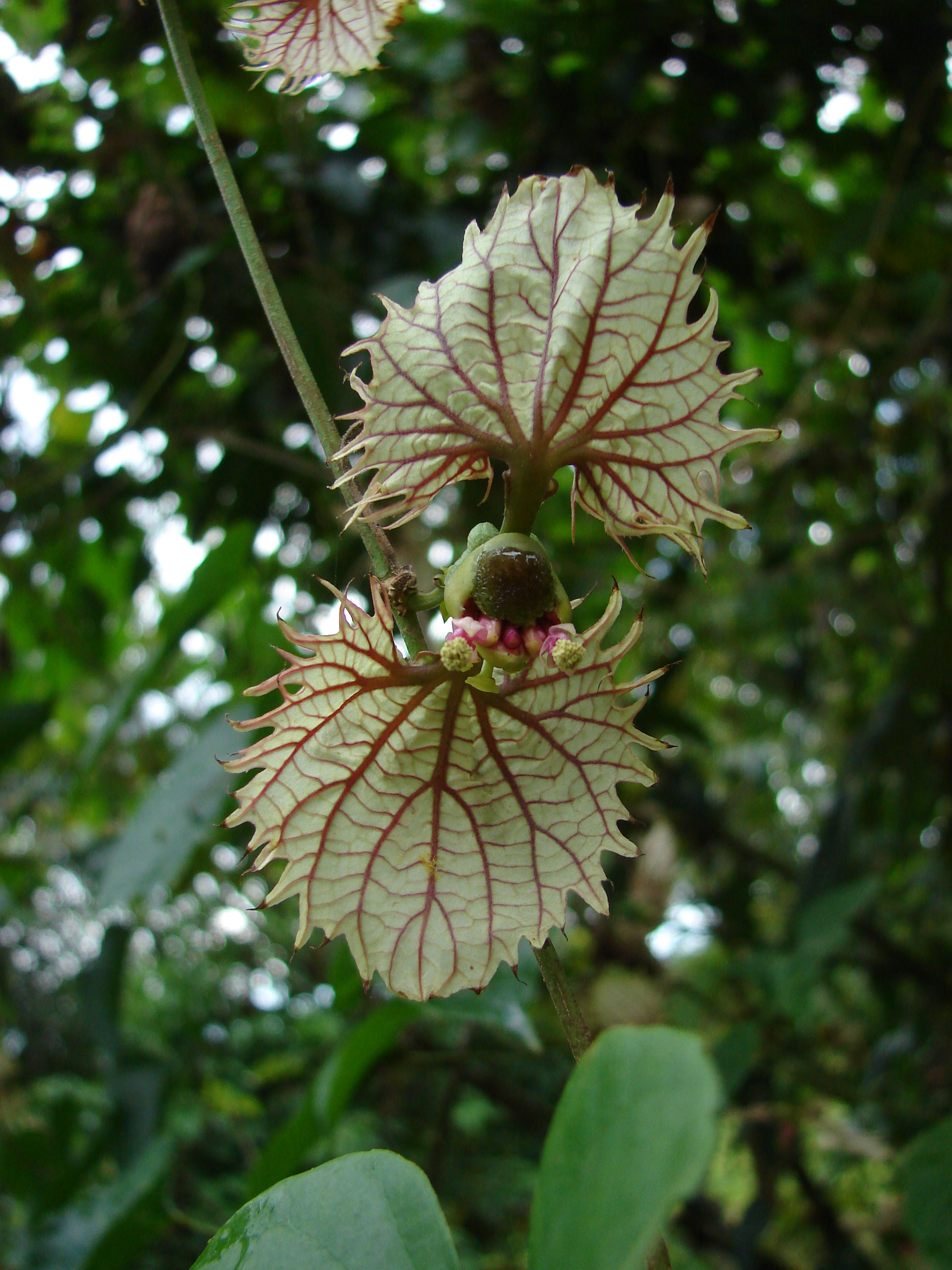
Dalechampia dioscoreifoila

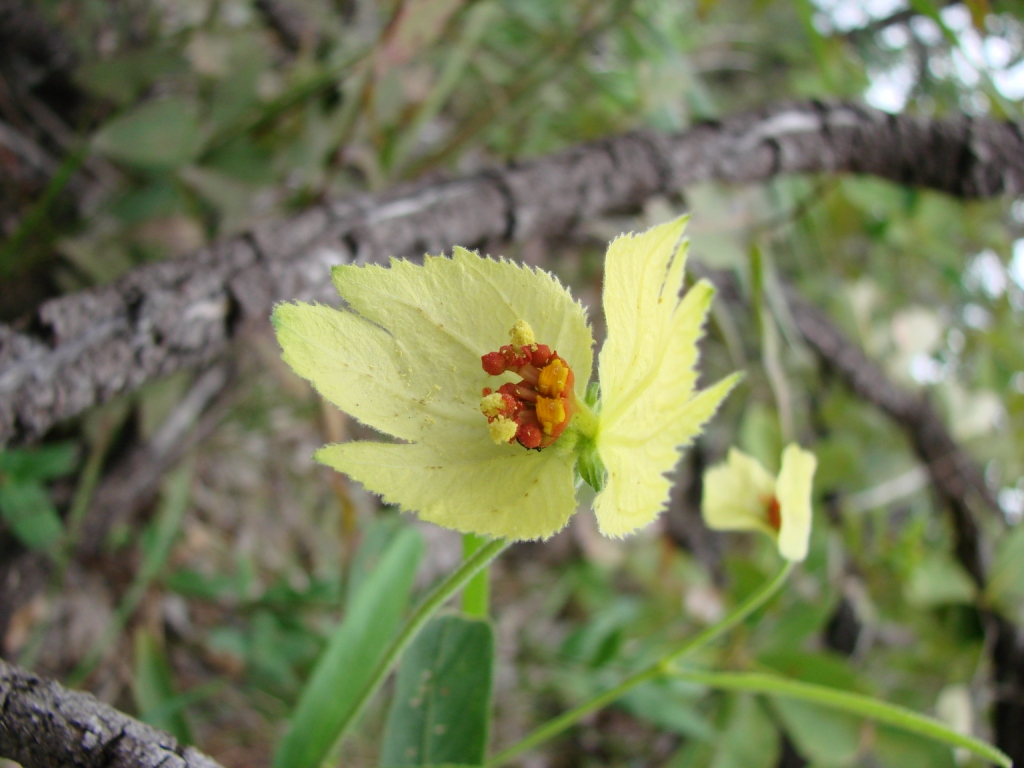
Dalechampia linearis

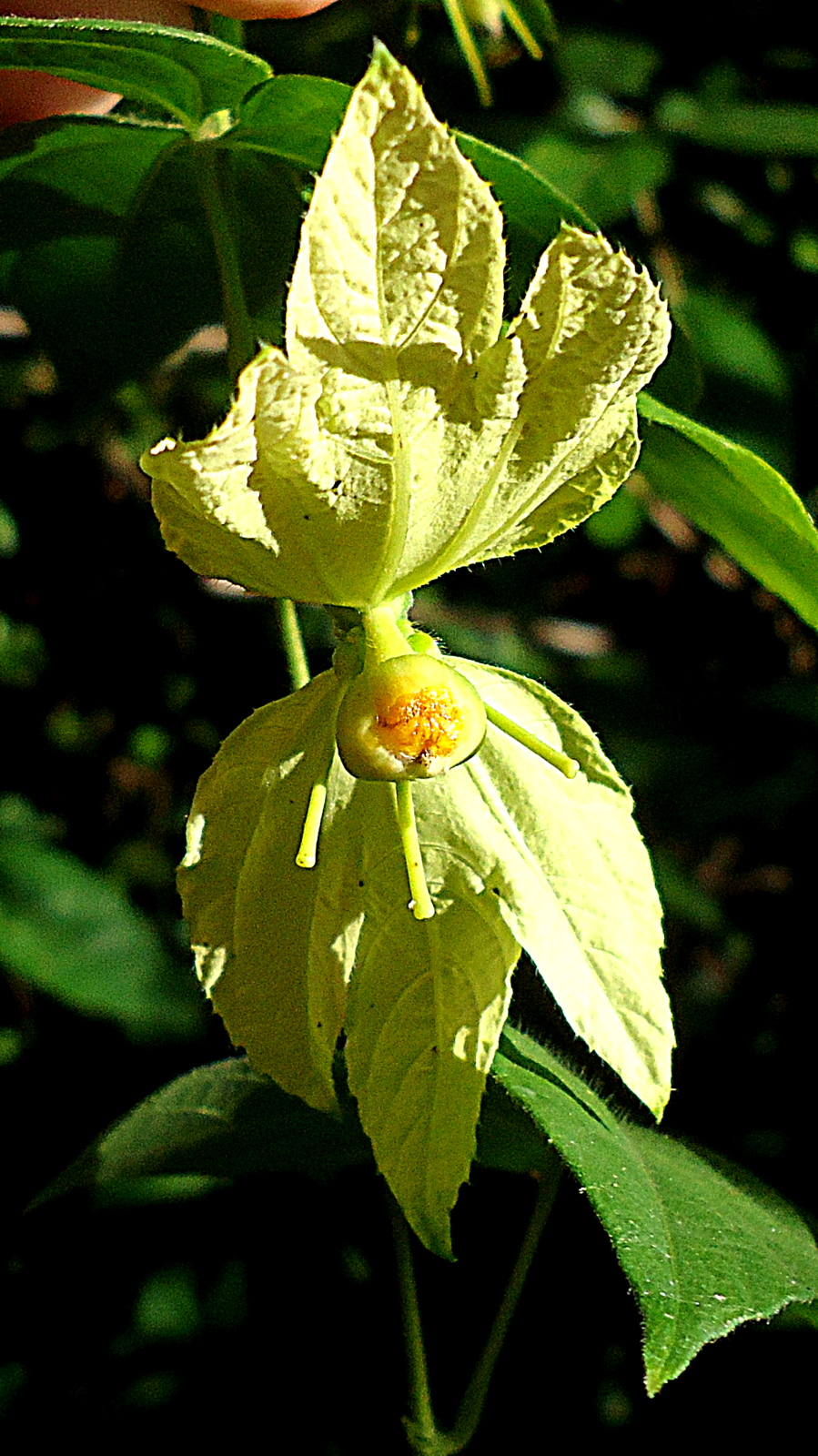
Dalechampia peckoltiana

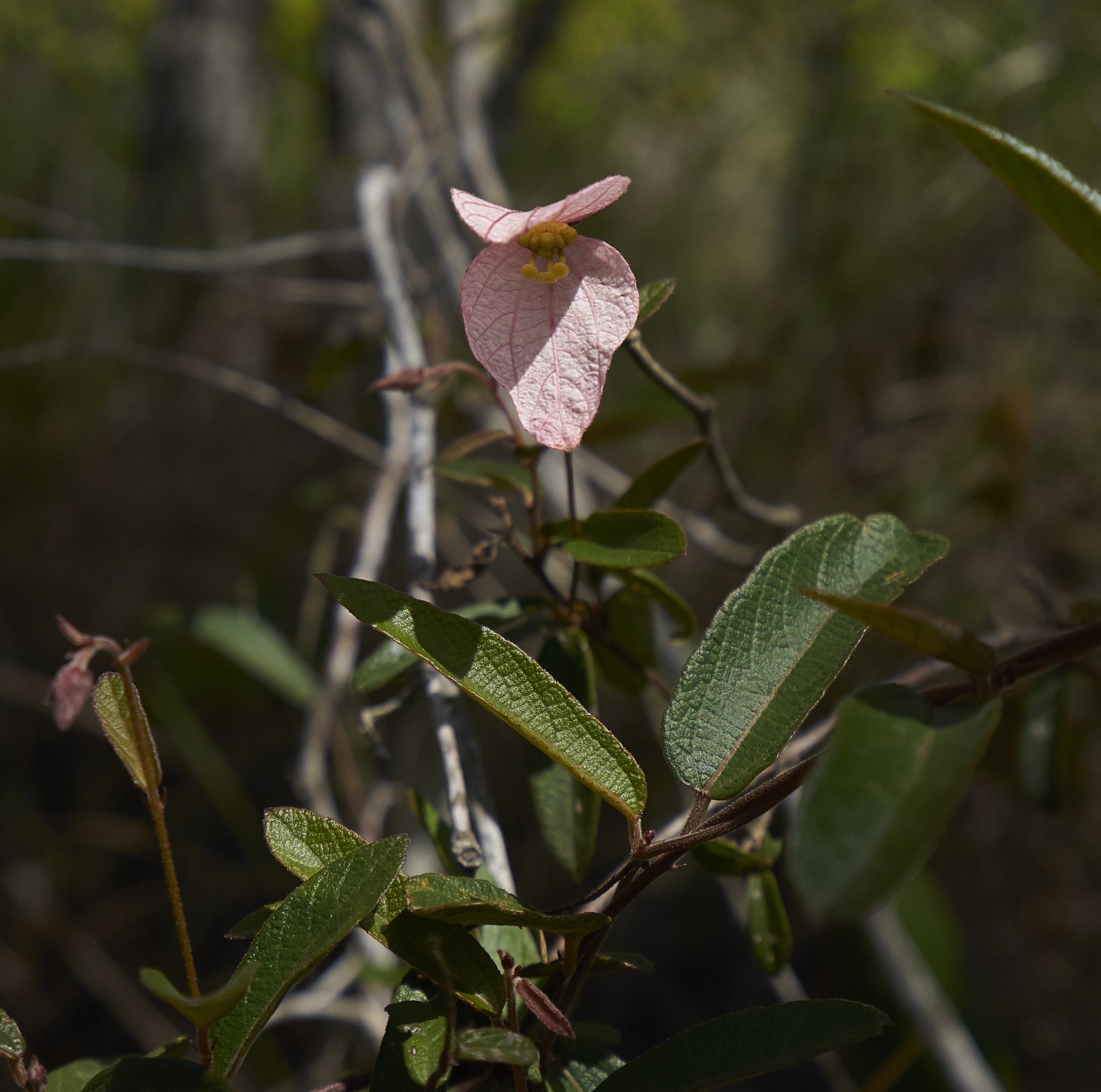
Dalechampia schippii

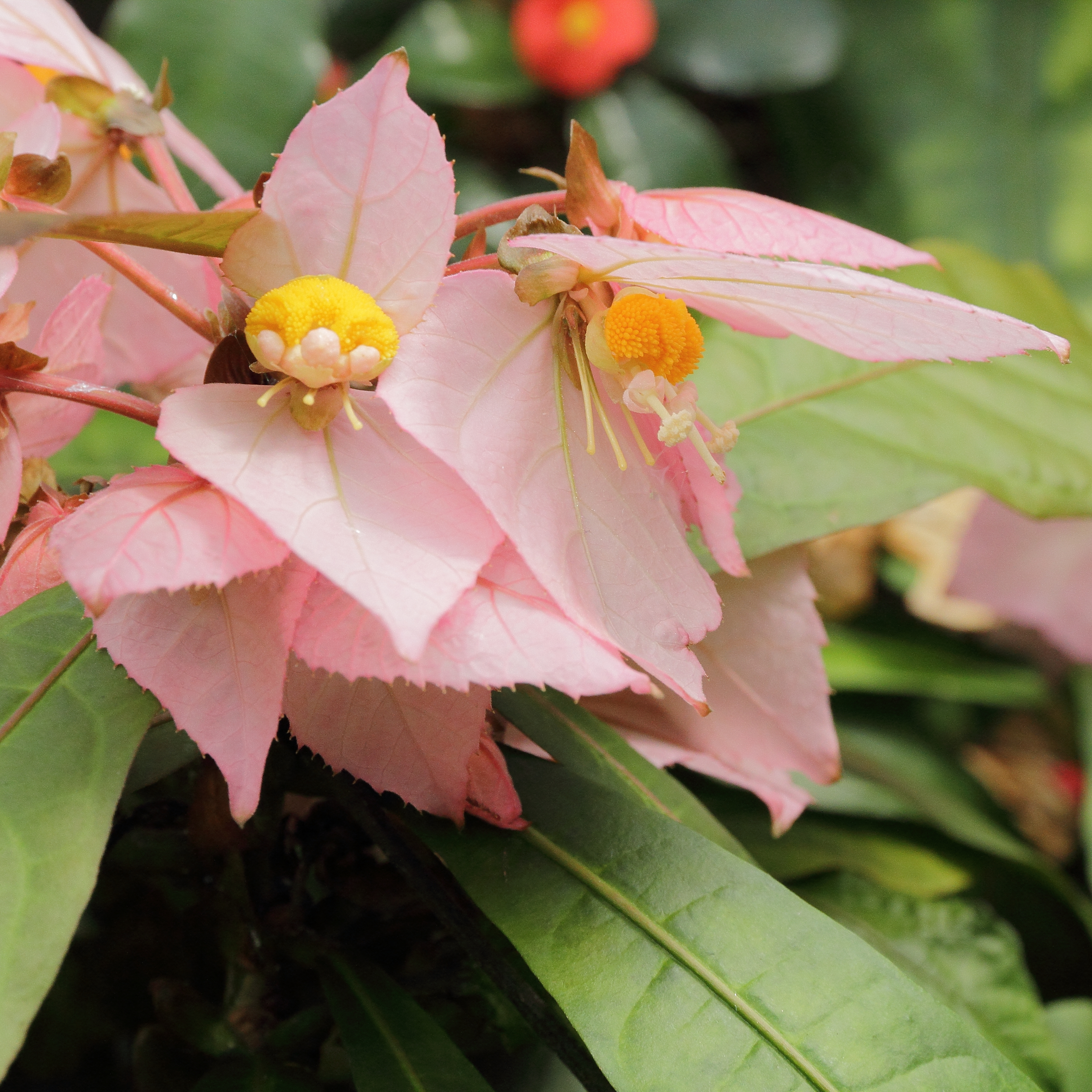
Dalechampia spathulata

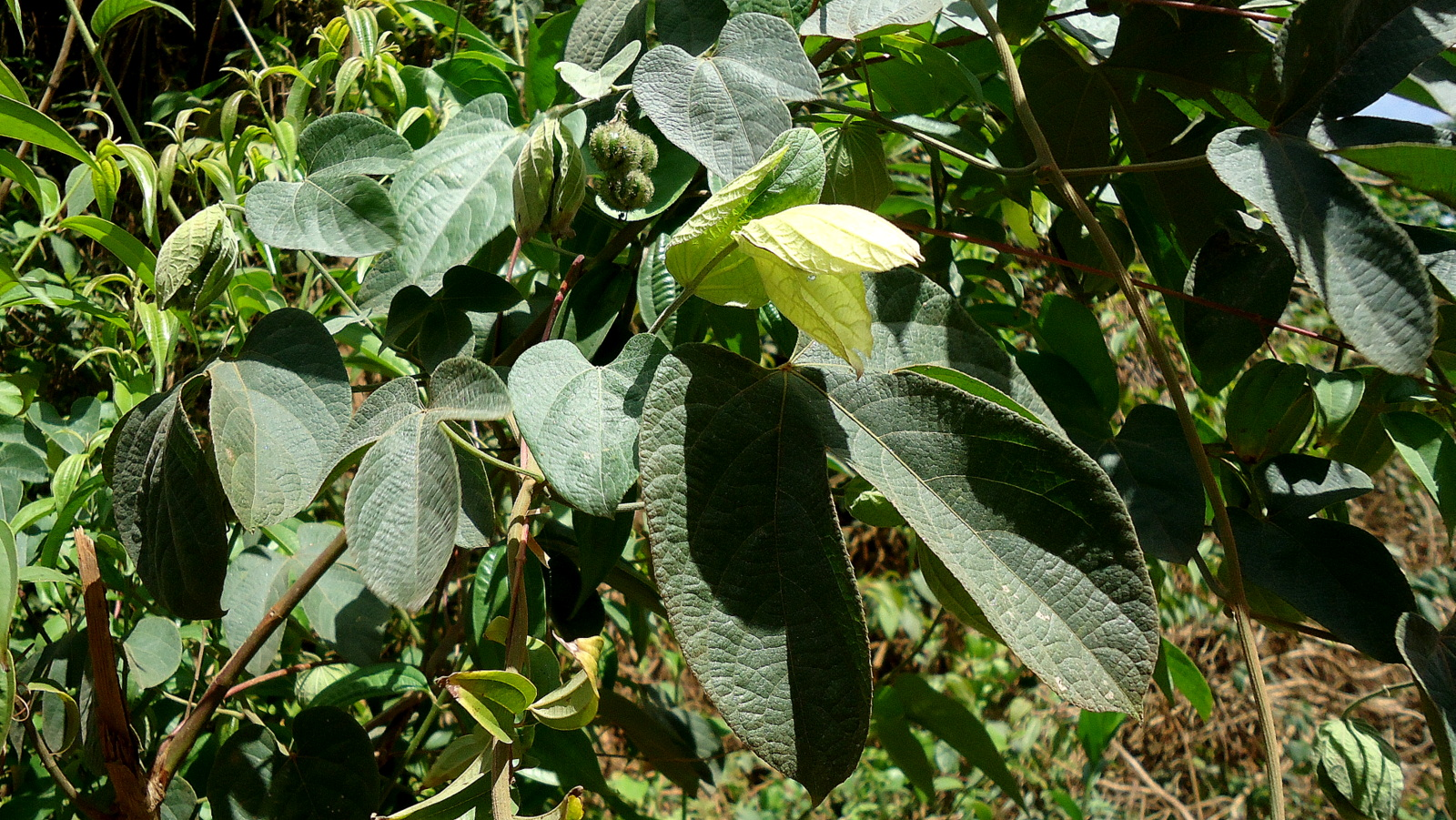
Dalechampia tiliifolia

Species

1. Dalechampia adscendens – Bolivia, Mato Grosso do Sul
2. Dalechampia affinis – N South America
3. Dalechampia alata – Bahia, Rio de Janeiro
4. Dalechampia albibracteosa – El Beni
5. Dalechampia allemii – Bahia
6. Dalechampia anomala – Paraguay, Paraná
7. Dalechampia arciana – Bahia
8. Dalechampia arenalensis – Costa Rica
9. Dalechampia aristolochiifolia – Peru
10. Dalechampia armbrusteri – Bahia, Espírito Santo
11. Dalechampia attenuistylus – Venezuela, Suriname, Fr Guiana
12. Dalechampia bangii – Bolivia, Paraguay, Rio Grande do Sul
13. Dalechampia bernieri – Madagascar
14. Dalechampia bidentata – Yunnan, SE Asia
15. Dalechampia boliviana – Bolivia, Paraguay, Rio Grande do Sul
16. Dalechampia brasiliensis – E Brazil
17. Dalechampia brevicolumna – Suriname, Fr Guiana
18. Dalechampia brevipedunculata – Amazonas in Brazil
19. Dalechampia brevipes – Mato Grosso, Mato Grosso do Sul, São Paulo
20. Dalechampia brownsbergensis – NE South America
21. Dalechampia burchellii – Goiás
22. Dalechampia burgeriana – Costa Rica
23. Dalechampia burmanica – Myanmar
24. Dalechampia canescens – SE Central America, NW South America
25. Dalechampia capensis – E + S Africa
26. Dalechampia caperonioides – Goiás, Brasília, Minas Gerais
27. Dalechampia catati – Madagascar
28. Dalechampia chevalieri – Cameroon, Central African Rep
29. Dalechampia chlorocephala – Madagascar
30. Dalechampia cissifolia – Mexico, Central America, NW + W South America
31. Dalechampia clausseniana – Brazil
32. Dalechampia clematidifolia – Madagascar
33. Dalechampia convolvuloides – E Brazil
34. Dalechampia coriacea – Bahia
35. Dalechampia cujabensis – Mato Grosso
36. Dalechampia decaryi – Madagascar
37. Dalechampia denticulata – Cuba
38. Dalechampia dioscoreifolia from Nicaragua to Bolivia
39. Dalechampia elongata – N Thailand
40. Dalechampia falcata – Cambodia, Thailand, Vietnam
41. Dalechampia fernandesii – Ceará
42. Dalechampia ficifolia – E Brazil
43. Dalechampia fragrans – Suriname, French Guiana
44. Dalechampia francisceana – Minas Gerais
45. Dalechampia galpinii – southern Africa
46. Dalechampia gentryi – Peru, NW Brazil
47. Dalechampia glechomifolia – S Brazil, Misiones
48. Dalechampia granadilla – Rio de Janeiro
49. Dalechampia guaranitica – Paraguay
50. Dalechampia hassleriana – Paraguay, Paraná
51. Dalechampia hastata – Amazonas in Brazil
52. Dalechampia herzogiana – Bolivia, Mato Grosso do Sul
53. Dalechampia heterobractea – N Brazil, Venezuela, 3 Guianas
54. Dalechampia hispida – Peru, Ecuador
55. Dalechampia humilis – Brazil
56. Dalechampia hutchisoniana – Peru
57. Dalechampia ilheotica – Pernambuco, Bahia
58. Dalechampia indica – S India, Sri Lanka
59. Dalechampia ipomoeifolia – tropical Africa
60. Dalechampia juruana – NW South America
61. Dalechampia karsteniana – N Colombia
62. Dalechampia katangensis – Katanga
63. Dalechampia laevigata – S Mexico, Belize, Honduras
64. Dalechampia leandrii – Rio de Janeiro
65. Dalechampia leucophylla – Goiás
66. Dalechampia liesneri – S Venezuela, NW Brazil
67. Dalechampia linearis – Brazil, Paraguay
68. Dalechampia luetzelburgii – Ceará, Pernambuco, Bahia
69. Dalechampia magnistipulata – Veracruz, Oaxaca
70. Dalechampia magnoliifolia – N + WC South America
71. Dalechampia martiana – São Paulo
72. Dalechampia megacarpa – S Venezuela, NW Brazil
73. Dalechampia meridionalis – Uruguay, S Brazil
74. Dalechampia micrantha – N + NW South America
75. Dalechampia micromeria – S Brazil, Paraguay
76. Dalechampia occidentalis – Mato Grosso
77. Dalechampia olfersiana – Minas Gerais
78. Dalechampia olympiana – Amazonas in Brazil
79. Dalechampia osana – Osa Peninsula
80. Dalechampia papillistigma – Bolívar
81. Dalechampia parvibracteata – NE South America
82. Dalechampia pavoniifolia – Somalia
83. Dalechampia peckoltiana – Rio de Janeiro
84. Dalechampia pentaphylla – Brazil
85. Dalechampia pernambucensis – Ceará, Pernambuco
86. Dalechampia perrieri – Madagascar
87. Dalechampia psilogyne – Goiás
88. Dalechampia purpurata – Bahia
89. Dalechampia regnellii – Minas Gerais
90. Dalechampia reitzkleinii – Santa Catarina
91. Dalechampia riedeliana – Mato Grosso
92. Dalechampia riparia – Santa Catarina
93. Dalechampia rubrivenia- Paraguay
94. Dalechampia scandens – Latin America, West Indies
95. Dalechampia schenckiana – Pernambuco
96. Dalechampia schippii – Belize
97. Dalechampia schottii – Yucatán
98. Dalechampia serrula – Canindeyú
99. Dalechampia shankii – Central America, Colombia, Ecuador
100. Dalechampia sinuata – Madagascar
101. Dalechampia spathulata – Central America, S Mexico
102. Dalechampia stenoloba – Karnataka
103. Dalechampia stenosepala – S Brazil, Paraguay, NE Argentina
104. Dalechampia stipulacea – South America
105. Dalechampia subintegra – Bahia
106. Dalechampia subternata – Madagascar
107. Dalechampia sylvestris – Brazil, Paraguay, Bolivia
108. Dalechampia tamifolia – Mauritius, Comoros, Madagascar, SW India
109. Dalechampia tenuiramea – Brazil, S Venezuela, Bolivia
110. Dalechampia tiliifolia – Central America, S Mexico, N + W South America, Trinidad
111. Dalechampia trifoliata – E Africa
112. Dalechampia triphylla – São Paulo, Rio de Janeiro
113. Dalechampia uleana – Brazil, Peru, Bolivia
114. Dalechampia ulmifolia – E. Paraguay, Rio Grande do Sul, Misiones
115. Dalechampia variifolia – Minas Gerais
116. Dalechampia velutina – Tamil Nadu
117. Dalechampia violacea – Rio Grande do Sul
118. Dalechampia viridissima – Bahia, Espírito Santo
119. Dalechampia weberbaueri – Peru
120. Dalechampia websteri – Nicaragua, Costa Rica, Panama
121. Dalechampia weddelliana – Goiás, Mato Grosso, Mato Grosso do Sul, Paraguay
