= Meon (disambiguation) =

The Meon is a river in Hampshire, England.

Meon may also refer to:

- Meon, Hampshire, a hamlet in the Fareham district of Hampshire, England
- East Meon, village and civil parish in the East Hampshire district of Hampshire, England
- West Meon, village and civil parish in Hampshire, England
- Meon Valley (UK Parliament constituency), constituency represented in the House
- Meon Valley Railway, (MVR) a cross-country railway in Hampshire, England that ran between Alton and Fareham
- Meonstoke, Hampshire, England
- Méon, a former commune in the Maine-et-Loire department in western France
- Dioptis meon, a moth
- Baal-meon, a biblical town
- HMS Meon (K269), a ship
- Meonwara, a Jutish tribe that settled in the Meon Valley during the 5th and 6th Centuries
- Meon (philosophy)
