= Dioptis restricta =

Scientific classification
- Kingdom: Animalia
- Phylum: Arthropoda
- Clade: Pancrustacea
- Class: Insecta
- Order: Lepidoptera
- Superfamily: Noctuoidea
- Family: Notodontidae
- Genus: Dioptis
- Species: D. restricta

Binomial name
- Dioptis restricta Warren, 1901

Synonyms
- Epilaus melda Boisduval, 1870

Species of moth

Dioptis restricta is a moth of the family Notodontidae first described by William Warren in 1901. It is endemic to eastern Brazil and possibly Peru.
