= Dioptis fratelloi =

Scientific classification
- Kingdom: Animalia
- Phylum: Arthropoda
- Clade: Pancrustacea
- Class: Insecta
- Order: Lepidoptera
- Superfamily: Noctuoidea
- Family: Notodontidae
- Genus: Dioptis
- Species: D. fratelloi

Binomial name
- Dioptis fratelloi Miller, 2008

Species of moth

Dioptis fratelloi is a moth of the family Notodontidae first described by James S. Miller in 2008. It is only known from Mount Wokomung and the north slope of Mount Roraima in western Guyana.

The length of the forewings is 19–19.5 mm for males and 21 mm for females.

== Etymology ==
The species is named in honor of Steve Fratello.
