= Dioptis nigrivenis =

Scientific classification
- Kingdom: Animalia
- Phylum: Arthropoda
- Clade: Pancrustacea
- Class: Insecta
- Order: Lepidoptera
- Superfamily: Noctuoidea
- Family: Notodontidae
- Genus: Dioptis
- Species: D. nigrivenis

Binomial name
- Dioptis nigrivenis Hering, 1925

Species of moth

Dioptis nigrivenis is a moth of the family Notodontidae first described by Hering in 1925. It is found in Ecuador and Peru.
