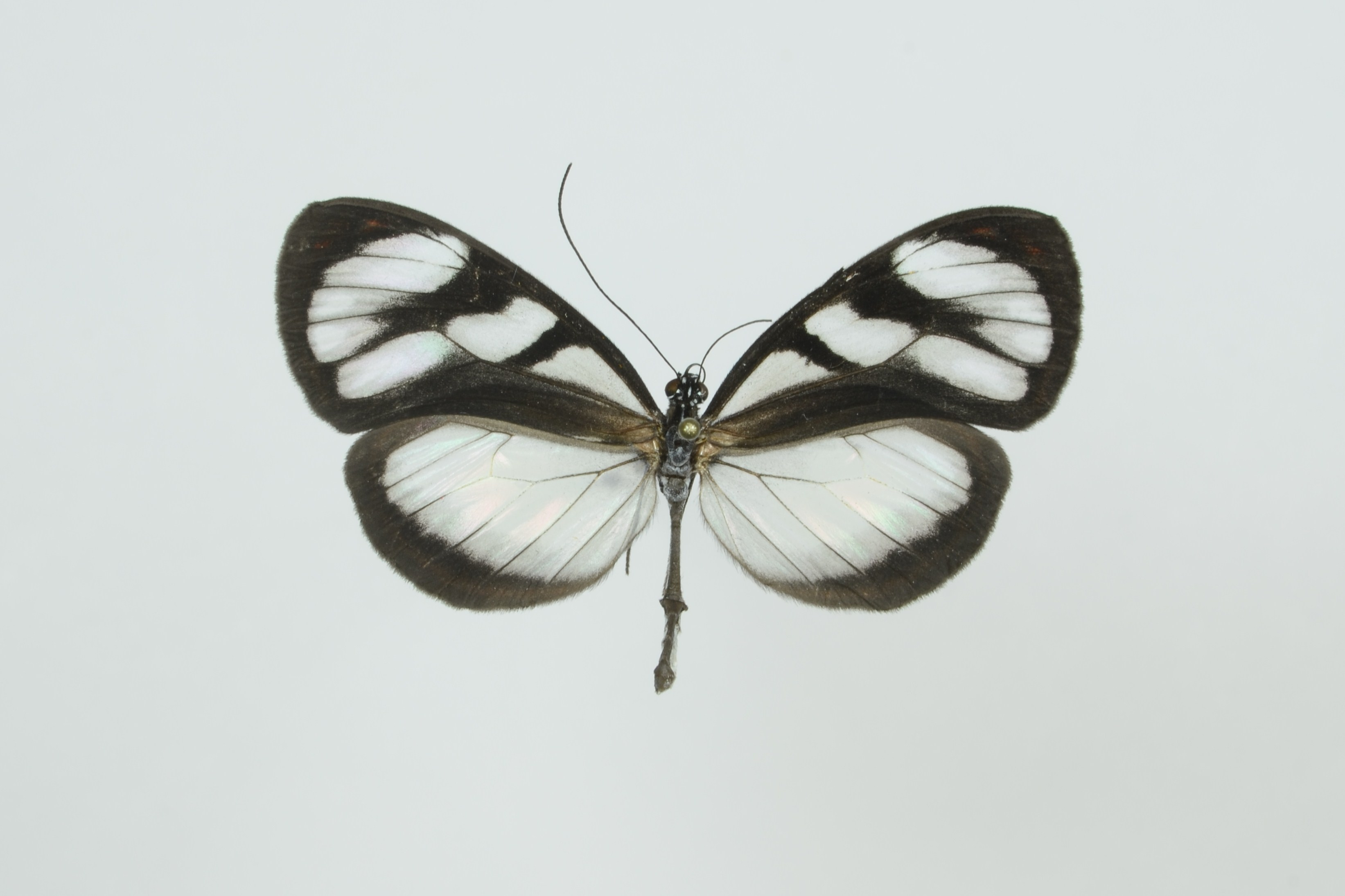

Scientific classification
- Domain: Eukaryota
- Kingdom: Animalia
- Phylum: Arthropoda
- Class: Insecta
- Order: Lepidoptera
- Family: Nymphalidae
- Genus: Oleria
- Species: O. tigilla

Binomial name
- Oleria tigilla (Weymer, 1899)

Synonyms
- Leycothyris tigilla Weymer, 1899; Leucothyris tigilla

= Oleria tigilla =

Species of butterfly

Oleria tigilla is a species of butterfly of the family Nymphalidae. It is found in Ecuador and Peru.

The wingspan is about 45 mm.
