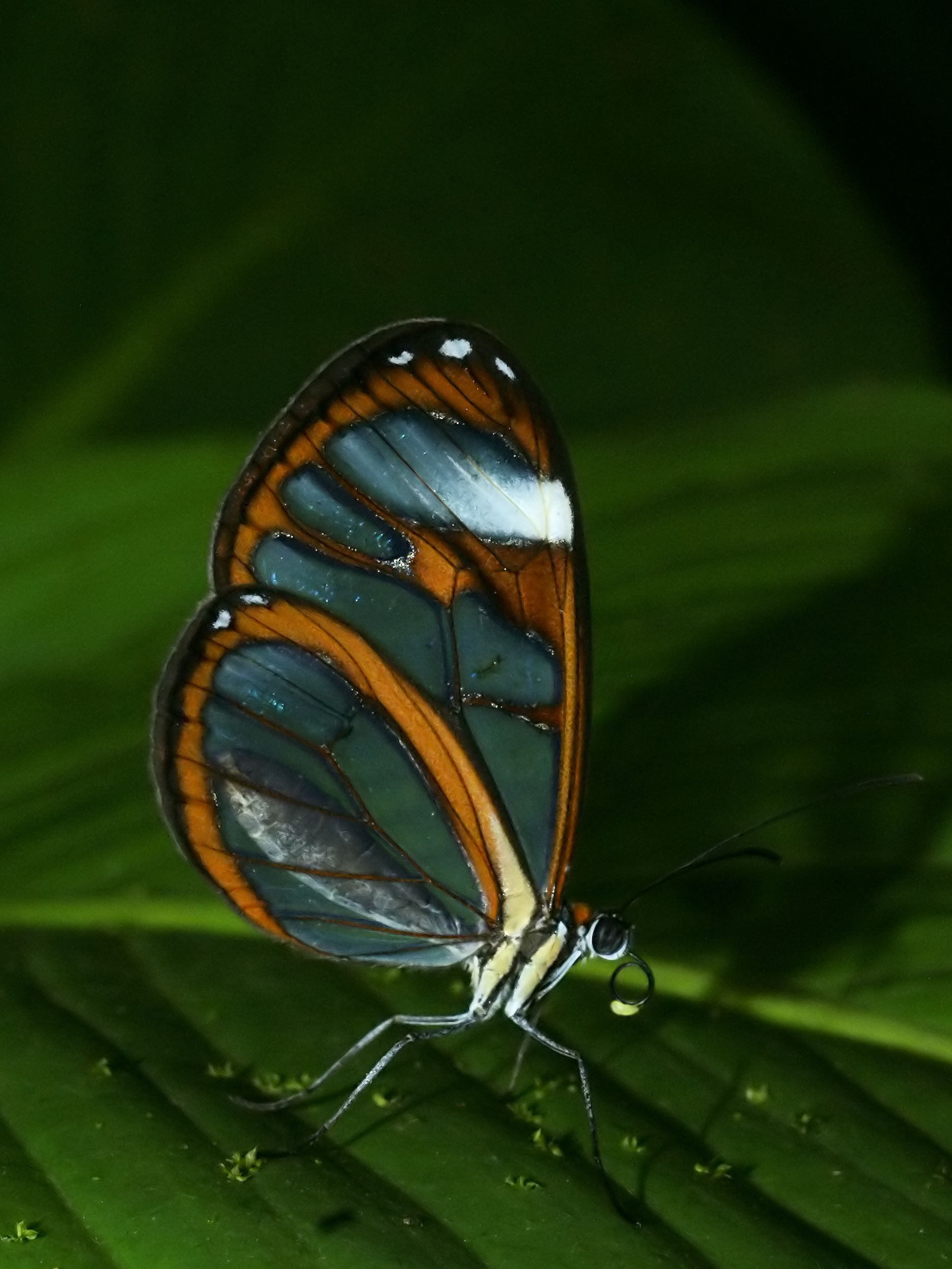

Scientific classification
- Kingdom: Animalia
- Phylum: Arthropoda
- Class: Insecta
- Order: Lepidoptera
- Family: Nymphalidae
- Genus: Oleria
- Species: O. rubescens

Binomial name
- Oleria rubescens (Butler & H. Druce, 1872)

Synonyms
- Leucothyris rubescens Butler & H. Druce, 1872

= Oleria rubescens =

Species of butterfly

Oleria rubescens is a butterfly of the family Nymphalidae first described by Arthur Gardiner Butler and Herbert Druce in 1872. It is found in Mexico, south to Panama and Costa Rica.

The wingspan is 49–50 mm. Forewing length is 23–25 mm.

The larvae feed on Solanum siparunoides.
