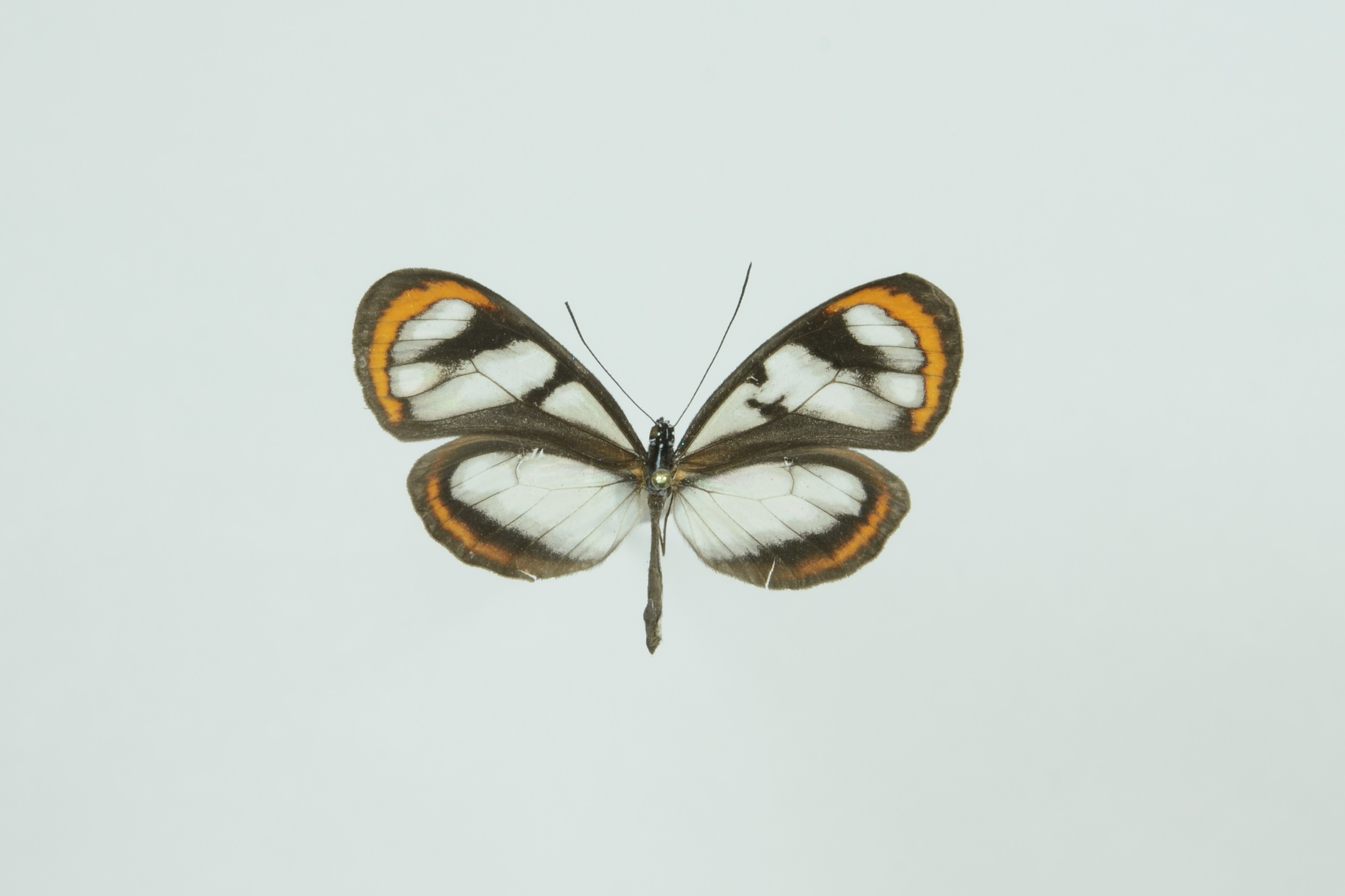

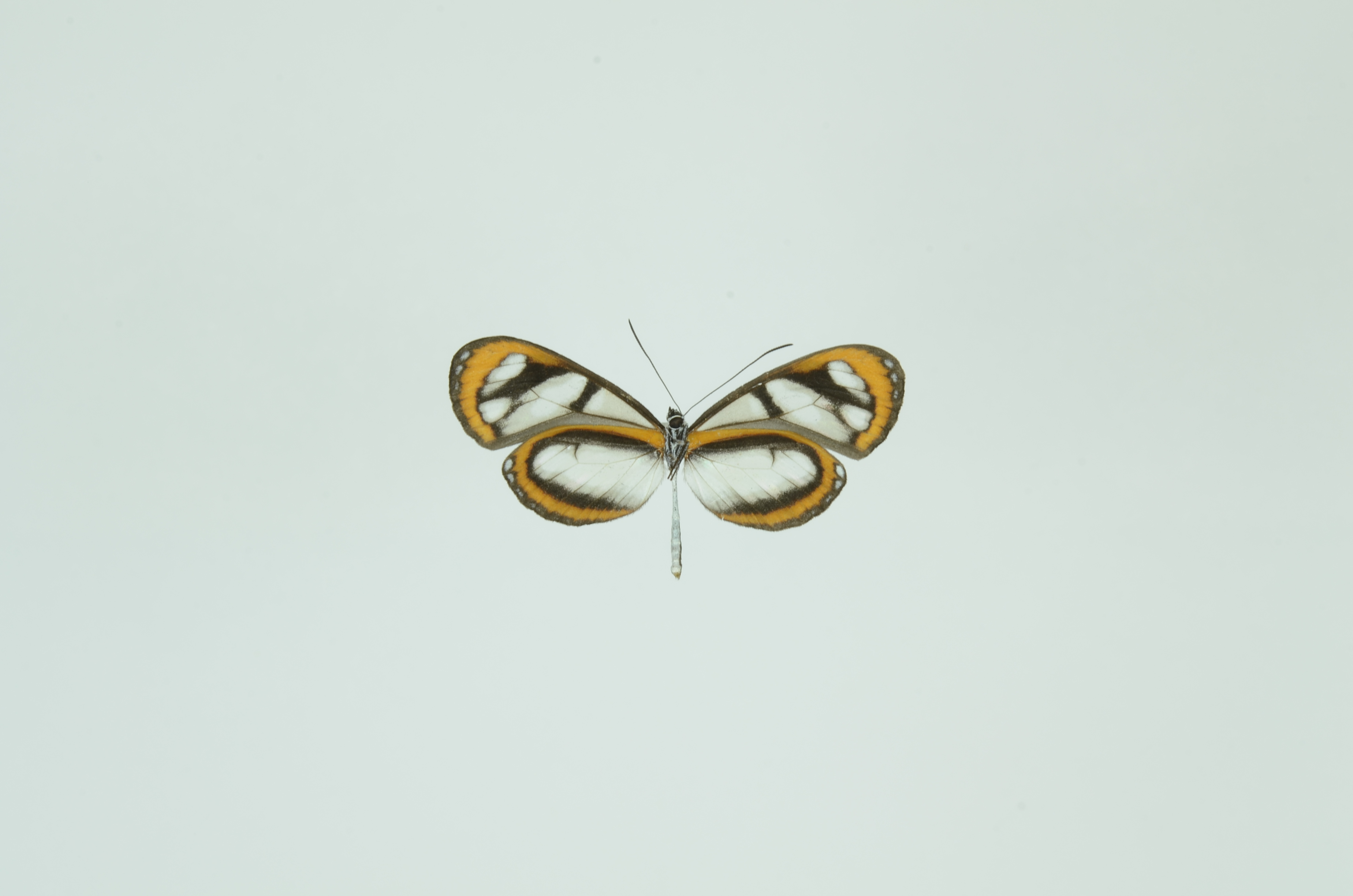

Scientific classification
- Domain: Eukaryota
- Kingdom: Animalia
- Phylum: Arthropoda
- Class: Insecta
- Order: Lepidoptera
- Family: Nymphalidae
- Genus: Oleria
- Species: O. gunilla

Binomial name
- Oleria gunilla (Hewitson, 1858)

Synonyms
- Ithomia gunilla Hewitson, 1858

= Oleria gunilla =

Species of butterfly

Oleria gunilla, the Gunilla clearwing, is a species of butterfly of the family Nymphalidae. It is found in Brazil, Ecuador, Colombia and Peru.

The wingspan is about 35 mm.

== Subspecies ==
- Oleria gunilla gunilla (Brazil (Amazonas))
- Oleria gunilla lota (Hewitson, 1872) (Ecuador)
- Oleria gunilla lerdina (Staudinger, 1885) (Peru)
- Oleria gunilla escura (Haensch, 1903) (Ecuador)
- Oleria gunilla lubilerda (Haensch, 1905) (Colombia)
- Oleria gunilla borilis (Haensch, 1909) (Peru)
- Oleria gunilla praemona (Haensch, 1909) (Peru)
- Oleria gunilla serdolis (Haensch, 1909) (Peru)
