= Dioptis vitrifera =

Scientific classification
- Kingdom: Animalia
- Phylum: Arthropoda
- Clade: Pancrustacea
- Class: Insecta
- Order: Lepidoptera
- Superfamily: Noctuoidea
- Family: Notodontidae
- Genus: Dioptis
- Species: D. vitrifera

Binomial name
- Dioptis vitrifera Warren, 1905

Synonyms
- Dioptis albifasciata Druce, 1907

Species of moth

Dioptis vitrifera is a moth of the family Notodontidae first described by William Warren in 1905. It is found in Amazonian Peru.
