= Dioptis candelaria =

Scientific classification
- Kingdom: Animalia
- Phylum: Arthropoda
- Clade: Pancrustacea
- Class: Insecta
- Order: Lepidoptera
- Superfamily: Noctuoidea
- Family: Notodontidae
- Genus: Dioptis
- Species: D. candelaria

Binomial name
- Dioptis candelaria H. Druce, 1885

Synonyms
- Dioptis nivea Hering, 1925

Species of moth

Dioptis candelaria is a moth of the family Notodontidae first described by Herbert Druce in 1885. It is found in Costa Rica and Panama.
