= Dioptis egla =

Scientific classification
- Kingdom: Animalia
- Phylum: Arthropoda
- Clade: Pancrustacea
- Class: Insecta
- Order: Lepidoptera
- Superfamily: Noctuoidea
- Family: Notodontidae
- Genus: Dioptis
- Species: D. egla

Binomial name
- Dioptis egla H. Druce, 1893

Synonyms
- Dioptis phaedima Prout, 1918

Species of moth

Dioptis egla is a moth of the family Notodontidae first described by Herbert Druce in 1893. It is found in Brazil, Peru and Ecuador.

The larvae feed on Geonoma species.

== Description ==
Dioptis egla has wing colors similar to the Monarch Butterfly, with orange and black. There are large transparent blotches that make up the majority of the wings.
