= Dioptis chloris =

Scientific classification
- Kingdom: Animalia
- Phylum: Arthropoda
- Clade: Pancrustacea
- Class: Insecta
- Order: Lepidoptera
- Superfamily: Noctuoidea
- Family: Notodontidae
- Genus: Dioptis
- Species: D. chloris

Binomial name
- Dioptis chloris H. Druce, 1893

Species of moth

Dioptis chloris is a moth of the family Notodontidae first described by Herbert Druce in 1893. It is found in southern Ecuador and Peru.
