= Dioptis leucothyris =

Scientific classification
- Kingdom: Animalia
- Phylum: Arthropoda
- Clade: Pancrustacea
- Class: Insecta
- Order: Lepidoptera
- Superfamily: Noctuoidea
- Family: Notodontidae
- Genus: Dioptis
- Species: D. leucothyris

Binomial name
- Dioptis leucothyris (Butler, 1876)

Synonyms
- Hyrmina leucothyris Butler, 1876

Species of insect

Dioptis leucothyris is a moth of the family Notodontidae first described by Arthur Gardiner Butler in 1876. It is found in Brazil and Peru.
