= Dioptis beckeri =

Scientific classification
- Kingdom: Animalia
- Phylum: Arthropoda
- Clade: Pancrustacea
- Class: Insecta
- Order: Lepidoptera
- Superfamily: Noctuoidea
- Family: Notodontidae
- Genus: Dioptis
- Species: D. beckeri

Binomial name
- Dioptis beckeri Miller, 2008

Species of moth

Dioptis beckeri is a moth of the family Notodontidae first described by James S. Miller in 2008. It is found in Rondônia in Brazil.

The length of the forewings is 15.5–18 mm for males and 19–20 mm for females.

== Etymology ==
The species is named in honor of Vitor Osmar Becker.
