= Dioptis subalbata =

Scientific classification
- Kingdom: Animalia
- Phylum: Arthropoda
- Clade: Pancrustacea
- Class: Insecta
- Order: Lepidoptera
- Superfamily: Noctuoidea
- Family: Notodontidae
- Genus: Dioptis
- Species: D. subalbata

Binomial name
- Dioptis subalbata (Dognin, 1904)

Synonyms
- Tithraustes subalbata Dognin, 1904

Species of moth

Dioptis subalbata is a moth of the family Notodontidae first described by Paul Dognin in 1904. It is found in Bolivia.
