= Dioptis pellucida =

Scientific classification
- Kingdom: Animalia
- Phylum: Arthropoda
- Clade: Pancrustacea
- Class: Insecta
- Order: Lepidoptera
- Superfamily: Noctuoidea
- Family: Notodontidae
- Genus: Dioptis
- Species: D. pellucida

Binomial name
- Dioptis pellucida Warren, 1901

Species of moth

Dioptis pellucida is a moth of the family Notodontidae first described by William Warren in 1901. It is found in Colombia.

There is a brown hindwing form, which belongs to a mimicry complex with several Ithomiini species, including Hypoleria lavinia, Ithomia diasia, Oleria amalda and Pseudoscada timna.
