= Dioptis butes =

Scientific classification
- Kingdom: Animalia
- Phylum: Arthropoda
- Clade: Pancrustacea
- Class: Insecta
- Order: Lepidoptera
- Superfamily: Noctuoidea
- Family: Notodontidae
- Genus: Dioptis
- Species: D. butes

Binomial name
- Dioptis butes (H. Druce, 1885)

Synonyms
- Tithraustes butes H. Druce, 1885; Phaeochlaena basalis Warren, 1900

Species of moth

Dioptis butes is a moth of the family Notodontidae first described by Herbert Druce in 1885. It is found from Costa Rica north to Belize and Veracruz in Mexico.
