= Dioptis incerta =

Scientific classification
- Kingdom: Animalia
- Phylum: Arthropoda
- Clade: Pancrustacea
- Class: Insecta
- Order: Lepidoptera
- Superfamily: Noctuoidea
- Family: Notodontidae
- Genus: Dioptis
- Species: D. incerta

Binomial name
- Dioptis incerta Hering, 1925

Species of moth

Dioptis incerta is a moth of the family Notodontidae, described by Erich Martin Hering in 1925 from Peru.
