= Dioptis ilerdina =

Scientific classification
- Kingdom: Animalia
- Phylum: Arthropoda
- Clade: Pancrustacea
- Class: Insecta
- Order: Lepidoptera
- Superfamily: Noctuoidea
- Family: Notodontidae
- Genus: Dioptis
- Species: D. ilerdina

Binomial name
- Dioptis ilerdina Bates, 1862

Synonyms
- Laurona herdina Walker, 1864

Species of moth

Dioptis ilerdina is a moth of the family Notodontidae first described by Henry Walter Bates in 1862. It is found in Brazil and Peru.
