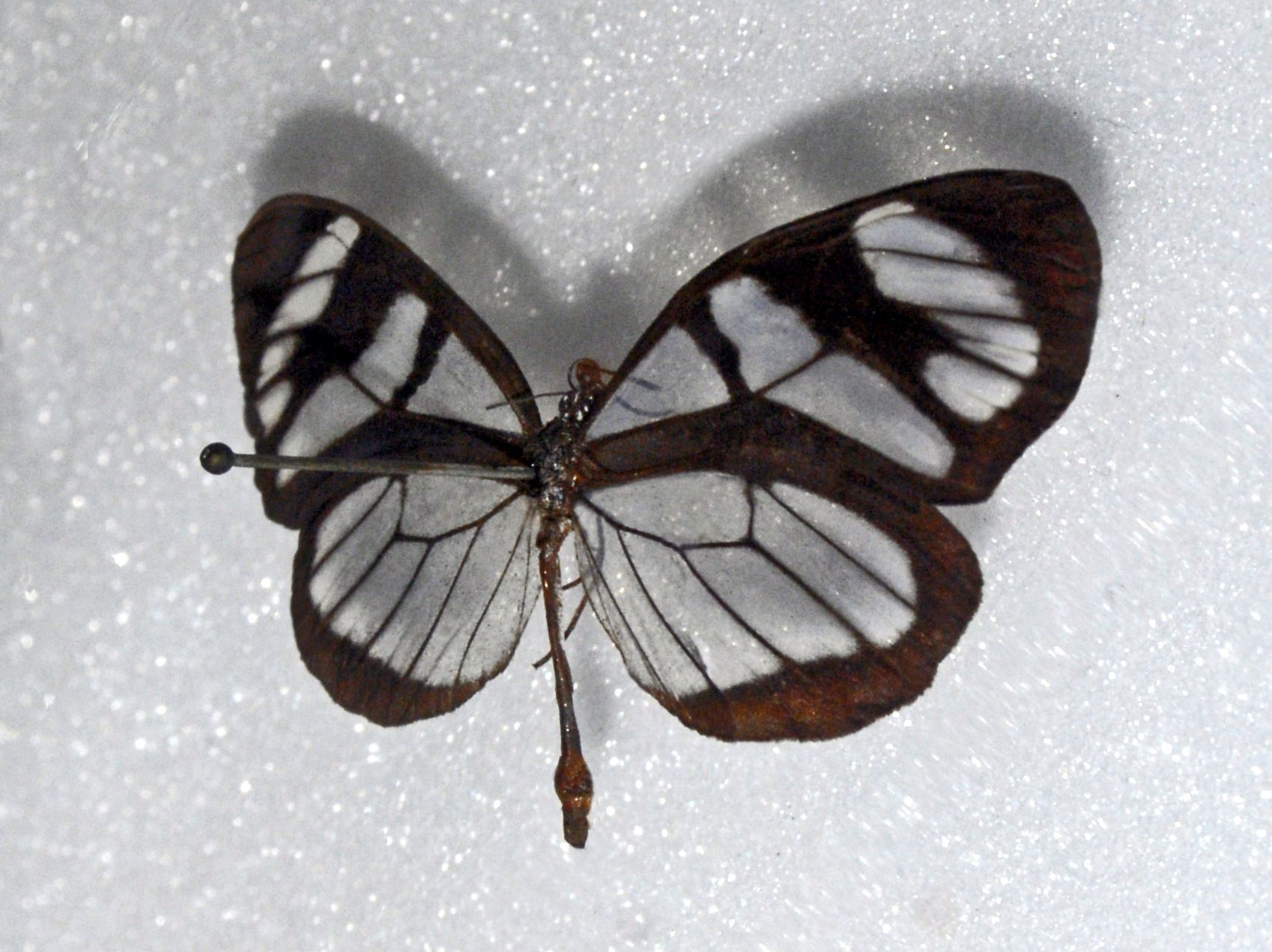
- Museum specimen

Scientific classification
- Domain: Eukaryota
- Kingdom: Animalia
- Phylum: Arthropoda
- Class: Insecta
- Order: Lepidoptera
- Family: Nymphalidae
- Genus: Oleria
- Species: O. flora

Binomial name
- Oleria flora (Cramer, 1779)

Synonyms
- Papilio flora Cramer, 1779; Ithomia flora Hewitson, 1855

= Oleria flora =

Species of butterfly

Oleria flora is a species of butterfly of the family Nymphalidae.

== Subspecies ==
- Oleria flora flora; present in Guyana
- Oleria flora subspecies; present in Brazil

== Description ==
Oleria flora has transparent wings with brown veins and a brown and orange border on the outer edge of the hindwings.

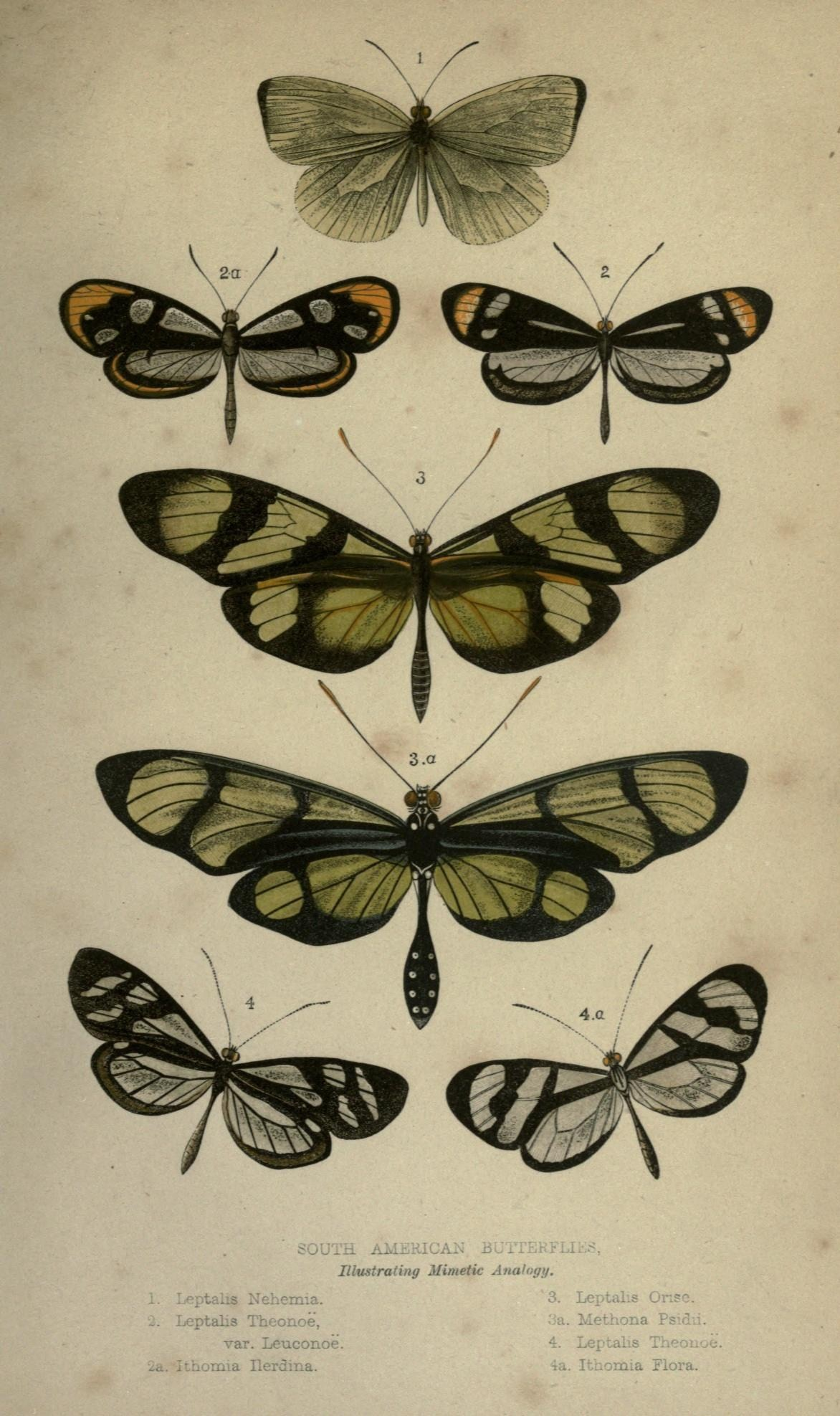
4a - Oleria flora from Curiosities of Entomology
