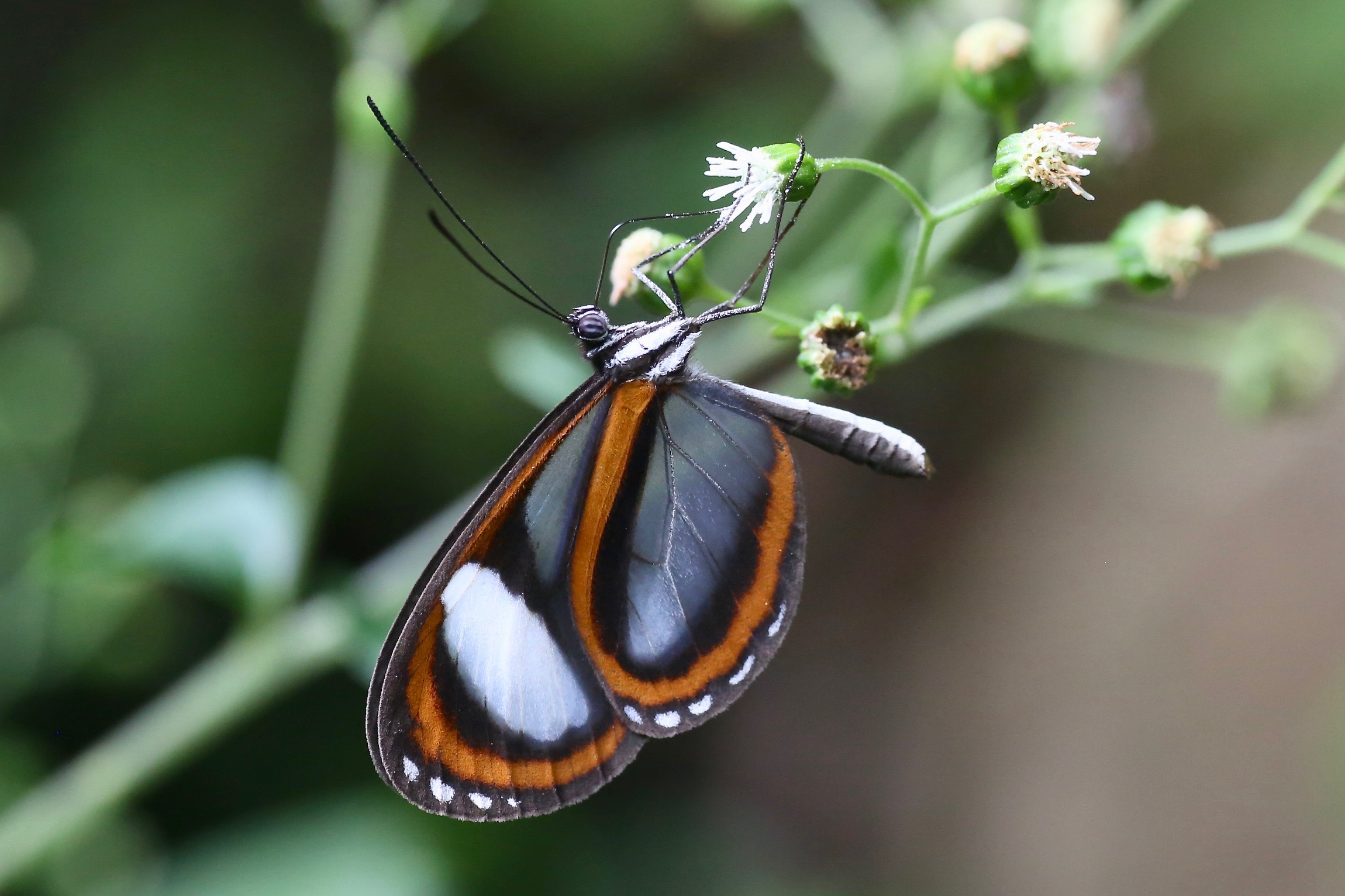
- Oleria estella estella – Río Alpayacu, Mera, Pastaza Province, Ecuador

Scientific classification
- Domain: Eukaryota
- Kingdom: Animalia
- Phylum: Arthropoda
- Class: Insecta
- Order: Lepidoptera
- Family: Nymphalidae
- Genus: Oleria
- Species: O. estella

Binomial name
- Oleria estella (Hewitson, 1868)

Synonyms
- Ithomia estella Hewitson, 1868

= Oleria estella =

Species of insect

Oleria estella, the Estella clearwing or Estella glasswing, is a species of clearwing (ithomiine) butterflies of the family Nymphalidae. It was first described by William Chapman Hewitson in 1868 and it is found from Venezuela to Bolivia in the eastern foothills of the Andes.

The wingspan of the males is 39–43 millimetres (1.5–1.7 in), females – 38–42 millimetres (1.5–1.7 in).

The larvae feed on Solanum species.

== Subspecies ==
- Oleria estella estella (Hewitson, [1868]) (eastern Ecuador and Peru)
- Oleria estella subosa (Haensch, [1909]) (Bolivia)
