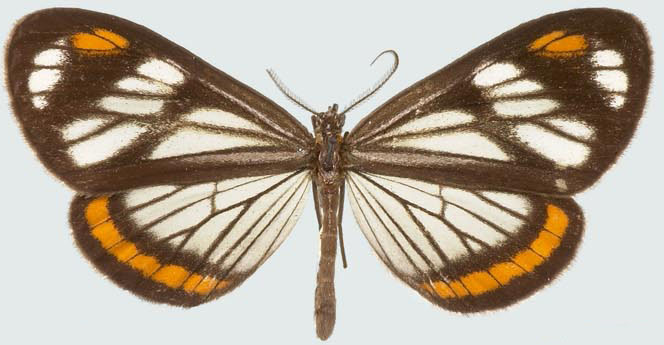
- Dioptis cyma

Scientific classification
- Kingdom: Animalia
- Phylum: Arthropoda
- Clade: Pancrustacea
- Class: Insecta
- Order: Lepidoptera
- Superfamily: Noctuoidea
- Family: Notodontidae
- Tribe: Dioptini
- Genus: Dioptis; Hubner, 1818

Synonyms
- Paradioptis Hering, 1925; Eudioptis Prout, 1918; Authyala Warren, 1905

= Dioptis =

Genus of moths

Dioptis is a genus of moths of the family Notodontidae. It consists of the following species:

- Dioptis aeliana Bates, 1862
- Dioptis angustifascia Hering, 1925
- Dioptis areolata Walker, 1854
- Dioptis beckeri Miller, 2008
- Dioptis butes (Druce, 1885)
- Dioptis candelaria Druce, 1885
- Dioptis charila Druce, 1893
- Dioptis charon Druce, 1893
- Dioptis cheledonis Druce, 1893
- Dioptis chloris Druce, 1893
- Dioptis climax Prout, 1918
- Dioptis columbiana Hering, 1925
- Dioptis curvifascia Prout, 1918
- Dioptis cyma Hübner, 1818
- Dioptis dentistriga Hering, 1925
- Dioptis egla Druce, 1893
- Dioptis eteocles (Druce, 1885)
- Dioptis fatima (Möschler, 1877)
- Dioptis fratelloi Miller, 2008
- Dioptis ilerdina Bates, 1862
- Dioptis incerta Hering, 1925
- Dioptis indentata Hering, 1925
- Dioptis leucothyris (Butler, 1876)
- Dioptis longipennis (Schaus, 1913)
- Dioptis meon (Cramer, 1775)
- Dioptis nigrivenis Hering, 1925
- Dioptis obliquaria (Warren, 1905)
- Dioptis onega Bates, 1862
- Dioptis otanes Druce, 1893
- Dioptis pallene Druce, 1893
- Dioptis paracyma Prout, 1918
- Dioptis pellucida Warren, 1901
- Dioptis peregrina Hering, 1925
- Dioptis phelina C. and R. Felder, 1874
- Dioptis proix Prout, 1918
- Dioptis restricta Warren, 1901
- Dioptis roraima Druce, 1893
- Dioptis stenothyris Prout, 1918
- Dioptis subalbata (Dognin, 1904)
- Dioptis tessmanni Hering, 1925
- Dioptis trailii (Butler, 1877)
- Dioptis uniguttata Warren, 1901
- Dioptis vacuata Warren, 1905
- Dioptis vitrifera Warren, 1905
- Dioptis zarza (Dognin, 1894)
