= Dioptis vacuata =

Scientific classification
- Kingdom: Animalia
- Phylum: Arthropoda
- Clade: Pancrustacea
- Class: Insecta
- Order: Lepidoptera
- Superfamily: Noctuoidea
- Family: Notodontidae
- Genus: Dioptis
- Species: D. vacuata

Binomial name
- Dioptis vacuata Warren, 1905

Species of moth

Dioptis vacuata is a moth of the family Notodontidae first described by William Warren in 1905. It is found in Panama.

It is the largest member of the genus Dioptis, with females reaching a forewing length of 25 mm.
