= Dioptis charila =

Scientific classification
- Kingdom: Animalia
- Phylum: Arthropoda
- Clade: Pancrustacea
- Class: Insecta
- Order: Lepidoptera
- Superfamily: Noctuoidea
- Family: Notodontidae
- Genus: Dioptis
- Species: D. charila

Binomial name
- Dioptis charila H. Druce, 1893

Species of moth

Dioptis charila is a moth of the family Notodontidae first described by Herbert Druce in 1893. It is found across northern South America and south into the Amazon basin, at least as far as Loreto, Peru.
