= Dioptis aeliana =

Scientific classification
- Kingdom: Animalia
- Phylum: Arthropoda
- Clade: Pancrustacea
- Class: Insecta
- Order: Lepidoptera
- Superfamily: Noctuoidea
- Family: Notodontidae
- Genus: Dioptis
- Species: D. aeliana

Binomial name
- Dioptis aeliana Bates, 1862

Species of moth

Dioptis aeliana is a moth of the family Notodontidae first described by Henry Walter Bates in 1862. It is found in lowland sites in Amazonian Brazil.
