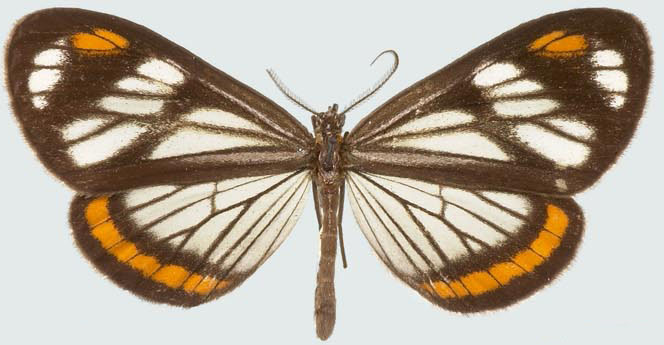

Scientific classification
- Kingdom: Animalia
- Phylum: Arthropoda
- Clade: Pancrustacea
- Class: Insecta
- Order: Lepidoptera
- Superfamily: Noctuoidea
- Family: Notodontidae
- Genus: Dioptis
- Species: D. cyma

Binomial name
- Dioptis cyma Hübner, 1818

= Dioptis cyma =

Species of moth

Dioptis cyma is a moth of the family Notodontidae first described by Jacob Hübner in 1818. It is found in Peru, Brazil and French Guiana.
