= Dioptis zarza =

Scientific classification
- Kingdom: Animalia
- Phylum: Arthropoda
- Clade: Pancrustacea
- Class: Insecta
- Order: Lepidoptera
- Superfamily: Noctuoidea
- Family: Notodontidae
- Genus: Dioptis
- Species: D. zarza

Binomial name
- Dioptis zarza (Dognin, 1894)

Synonyms
- Monocreaga zarza Dognin, 1894

Species of moth

Dioptis zarza is a moth of the family Notodontidae first described by Paul Dognin in 1894. It is found in Ecuador.
