= Dioptis uniguttata =

Scientific classification
- Kingdom: Animalia
- Phylum: Arthropoda
- Clade: Pancrustacea
- Class: Insecta
- Order: Lepidoptera
- Superfamily: Noctuoidea
- Family: Notodontidae
- Genus: Dioptis
- Species: D. uniguttata

Binomial name
- Dioptis uniguttata Warren, 1901

Synonyms
- Dioptis quirites Druce, 1907

Species of moth

Dioptis uniguttata is a moth of the family Notodontidae first described by William Warren in 1901. It is found in Colombia and Ecuador.
