= Dioptis phelina =

Scientific classification
- Kingdom: Animalia
- Phylum: Arthropoda
- Clade: Pancrustacea
- Class: Insecta
- Order: Lepidoptera
- Superfamily: Noctuoidea
- Family: Notodontidae
- Genus: Dioptis
- Species: D. phelina

Binomial name
- Dioptis phelina C. Felder & R. Felder, 1874

Synonyms
- Tithraustes impleta Warren, 1900; Dioptis pandates Druce, 1893

Species of moth

Dioptis phelina is a moth of the family Notodontidae first described by Cajetan and Rudolf Felder in 1874. It is endemic to the region of Bogotá in Colombia.
