= Dioptis longipennis =

Scientific classification
- Kingdom: Animalia
- Phylum: Arthropoda
- Clade: Pancrustacea
- Class: Insecta
- Order: Lepidoptera
- Superfamily: Noctuoidea
- Family: Notodontidae
- Genus: Dioptis
- Species: D. longipennis

Binomial name
- Dioptis longipennis (Schaus, 1913)

Synonyms
- Tithraustes longipennis Schaus, 1913

Species of moth

Dioptis longipennis is a moth of the family Notodontidae first described by William Schaus in 1913. It is found in Costa Rica, Panama and Nicaragua.

The larvae feed on Asterogyne, Calyptrogyne, Geonoma and Prestoea species.
