= Dioptis areolata =

Scientific classification
- Kingdom: Animalia
- Phylum: Arthropoda
- Clade: Pancrustacea
- Class: Insecta
- Order: Lepidoptera
- Superfamily: Noctuoidea
- Family: Notodontidae
- Genus: Dioptis
- Species: D. areolata

Binomial name
- Dioptis areolata Walker, 1854

Species of moth

Dioptis areolata is a moth of the family Notodontidae first described by Francis Walker in 1854. It is found in Brazil and Venezuela.
