= Dioptis tessmanni =

Scientific classification
- Kingdom: Animalia
- Phylum: Arthropoda
- Clade: Pancrustacea
- Class: Insecta
- Order: Lepidoptera
- Superfamily: Noctuoidea
- Family: Notodontidae
- Genus: Dioptis
- Species: D. tessmanni

Binomial name
- Dioptis tessmanni Hering, 1925

Synonyms
- Dioptis opaca Hering, 1925

Species of moth

Dioptis tessmanni is a moth of the family Notodontidae first described by Hering in 1925. It is found in Peru.
