= Dioptis trailii =

Scientific classification
- Kingdom: Animalia
- Phylum: Arthropoda
- Clade: Pancrustacea
- Class: Insecta
- Order: Lepidoptera
- Superfamily: Noctuoidea
- Family: Notodontidae
- Genus: Dioptis
- Species: D. trailii

Binomial name
- Dioptis trailii (Butler, 1877)

Synonyms
- Hyrmina trailii Butler, 1877

Species of moth

Dioptis trailii is a moth of the family Notodontidae first described by Arthur Gardiner Butler in 1877. It occurs at localities throughout the upper Amazon basin of Brazil and Peru, and is known from at least one locality in central Venezuela.
