= Dioptis stenothyris =

Scientific classification
- Kingdom: Animalia
- Phylum: Arthropoda
- Clade: Pancrustacea
- Class: Insecta
- Order: Lepidoptera
- Superfamily: Noctuoidea
- Family: Notodontidae
- Genus: Dioptis
- Species: D. stenothyris

Binomial name
- Dioptis stenothyris L. B. Prout, 1918

Species of moth

Dioptis stenothyris is a moth of the family Notodontidae first described by Louis Beethoven Prout in 1918. It is found in Brazil and Peru.

== Bibliography ==
- Miller, James S. (2009). "Generic revision of the Dioptinae (Lepidoptera: Noctuoidea: Notodontidae) Part 1: Dioptini". Bulletin of the American Museum of Natural History. 321 (2): 1–676. doi:10.1206/321.1. hdl:2246/5978. S2CID 86824329.
