= Dioptis fatima =

Scientific classification
- Kingdom: Animalia
- Phylum: Arthropoda
- Clade: Pancrustacea
- Class: Insecta
- Order: Lepidoptera
- Superfamily: Noctuoidea
- Family: Notodontidae
- Genus: Dioptis
- Species: D. fatima

Binomial name
- Dioptis fatima (Möschler, 1877)

Synonyms
- Hyrmina fatima Möschler, 1877

Species of moth

Dioptis fatima is a moth of the family Notodontidae first described by Heinrich Benno Möschler in 1877. It is found in Brazil, Venezuela, Guyana, Suriname, French Guiana and Peru.
