= Dioptis charon =

Scientific classification
- Kingdom: Animalia
- Phylum: Arthropoda
- Clade: Pancrustacea
- Class: Insecta
- Order: Lepidoptera
- Superfamily: Noctuoidea
- Family: Notodontidae
- Genus: Dioptis
- Species: D. charon

Binomial name
- Dioptis charon H. Druce, 1893

Species of moth

Dioptis charon is a moth of the family Notodontidae first described by Herbert Druce in 1893. It is found in Bolivia and the lowlands of south-eastern Peru.
