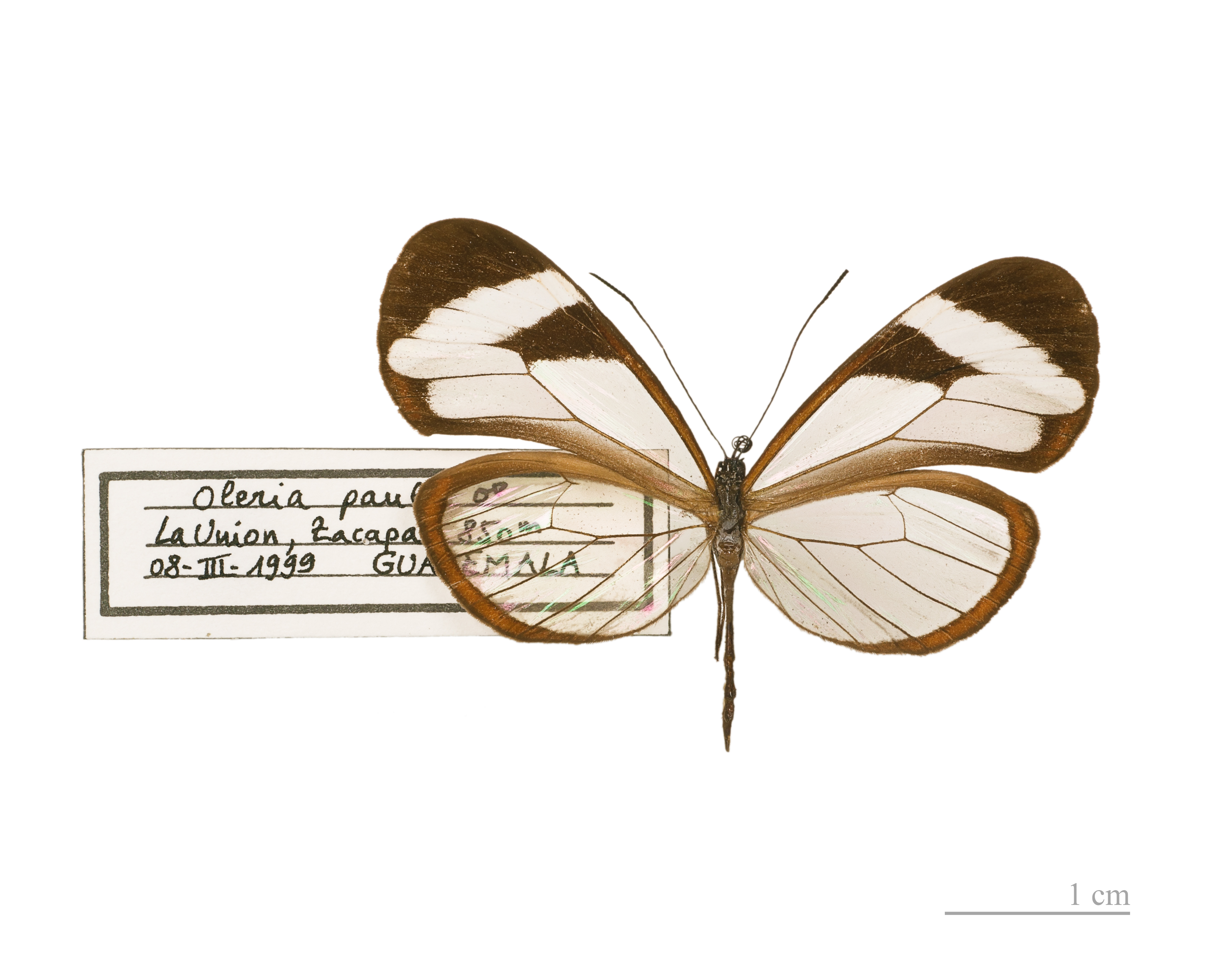
- Oleria paula

Scientific classification
- Domain: Eukaryota
- Kingdom: Animalia
- Phylum: Arthropoda
- Class: Insecta
- Order: Lepidoptera
- Family: Nymphalidae
- Subfamily: Danainae
- Tribe: Ithomiini
- Genus: Oleria; Hübner, 1816

Synonyms
- Athesis Weymer, 1890; Leucothyris Boisduval, 1870; Pteronymia Longstaff, 1912

= Oleria =

Genus of brush-footed butterflies

Oleria is a genus of clearwing (ithomiine) butterflies, named by Jacob Hübner in 1816. They are in the brush-footed butterfly family, Nymphalidae.

== Species ==
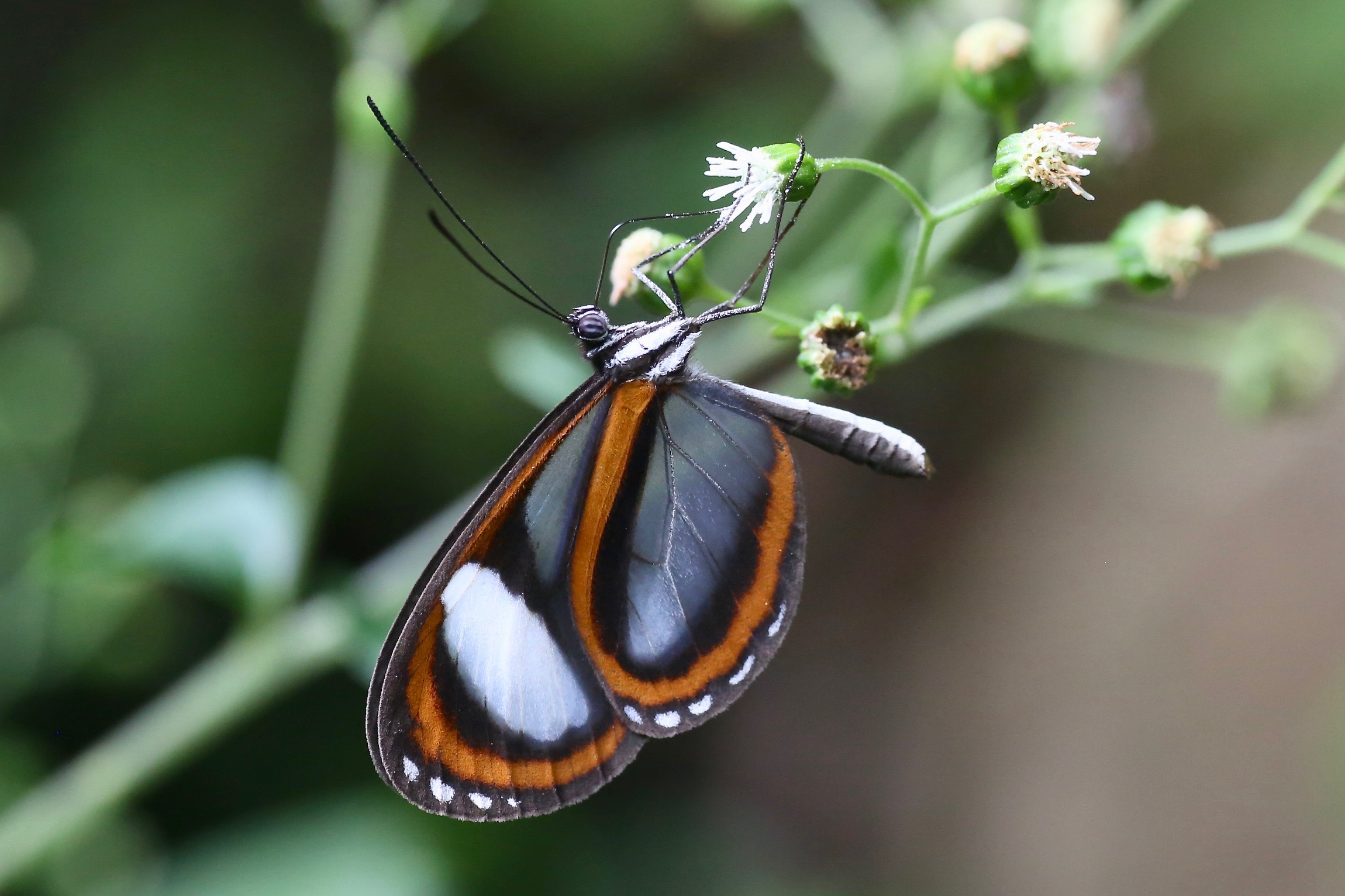
Oleria estella estella in Pastaza Province, Ecuador

Arranged alphabetically within species groups:

- Oleria aegle (Fabricius, 1776)
- Oleria agarista (C. Felder & R. Felder, 1862)
- Oleria alexina (Hewitson, [1859])
- Oleria amalda (Hewitson, [1857])
- Oleria antaxis (Haensch, 1909)
- Oleria aquata (Weymer, 1875)
- Oleria assimilis (Haensch, 1903)
- Oleria astrea (Cramer, [1775])
- Oleria athalina (Staudinger, [1884])
- Oleria attalia (Hewitson, 1855)
- Oleria bioculata (Haensch, 1905)
- Oleria canilla (Hewitson, 1874)
- Oleria cyrene (Latreille, [1809])
- Oleria deronda (Hewitson, 1876)
- Oleria derondina (Haensch, 1909)
- Oleria enania (Haensch, 1909)
- Oleria estella (Hewitson, 1868)
- Oleria fasciata (Haensch, 1903)
- Oleria flora (Cramer, 1779)
- Oleria fumata (Haensch, 1905)
- Oleria gunilla (Hewitson, 1858)
- Oleria ilerdina (Hewitson, [1858])
- Oleria ilerdinoides (Staudinger, 1885)
- Oleria makrena (Hewitson, [1854])
- Oleria olerioides (d'Almeida, 1952)
- Oleria onega (Hewitson, [1852])
- Oleria padilla (Hewitson, 1863)
- Oleria paula (Weymer, 1883)
- Oleria phenomoe (Doubleday, [1847])
- Oleria quadrata (Haensch, 1903)
- Oleria quintina (C. Felder & R. Felder, 1865)
- Oleria radina (Haensch, 1909)
- Oleria rubescens (Butler & H. Druce, 1872)
- Oleria santineza (Haensch, 1903)
- Oleria sexmaculata (Haensch, 1903)
- Oleria similigena d'Almeida, 1962
- Oleria synnova (Hewitson, [1859])
- Oleria tigilla (Weymer, 1899)
- Oleria tremona (Haensch, 1909)
- Oleria vicina (Salvin, 1869)
- Oleria victorine (Guérin-Méneville, [1844])
- Oleria zea (Hewitson, [1855])
- Oleria zelica (Hewitson, 1856)

The Ollantaya species group:

- Oleria aegineta (Hewitson, 1869)
- Oleria baizana (Haensch, 1903)
