= Dioptis eteocles =

Scientific classification
- Kingdom: Animalia
- Phylum: Arthropoda
- Clade: Pancrustacea
- Class: Insecta
- Order: Lepidoptera
- Superfamily: Noctuoidea
- Family: Notodontidae
- Genus: Dioptis
- Species: D. eteocles

Binomial name
- Dioptis eteocles (H. Druce, 1885)

Synonyms
- Tithraustes eteocles H. Druce, 1885

Species of moth

Dioptis eteocles is a moth of the family Notodontidae first described by Herbert Druce in 1885. It is found in Nicaragua, Honduras and Guatemala.
