= Dioptis obliquaria =

Scientific classification
- Kingdom: Animalia
- Phylum: Arthropoda
- Clade: Pancrustacea
- Class: Insecta
- Order: Lepidoptera
- Superfamily: Noctuoidea
- Family: Notodontidae
- Genus: Dioptis
- Species: D. obliquaria

Binomial name
- Dioptis obliquaria (Warren, 1905)

Synonyms
- Authyala obliquaria Warren, 1905

Species of moth

Dioptis obliquaria is a moth of the family Notodontidae first described by William Warren in 1905. It is found in southeastern Peru.
