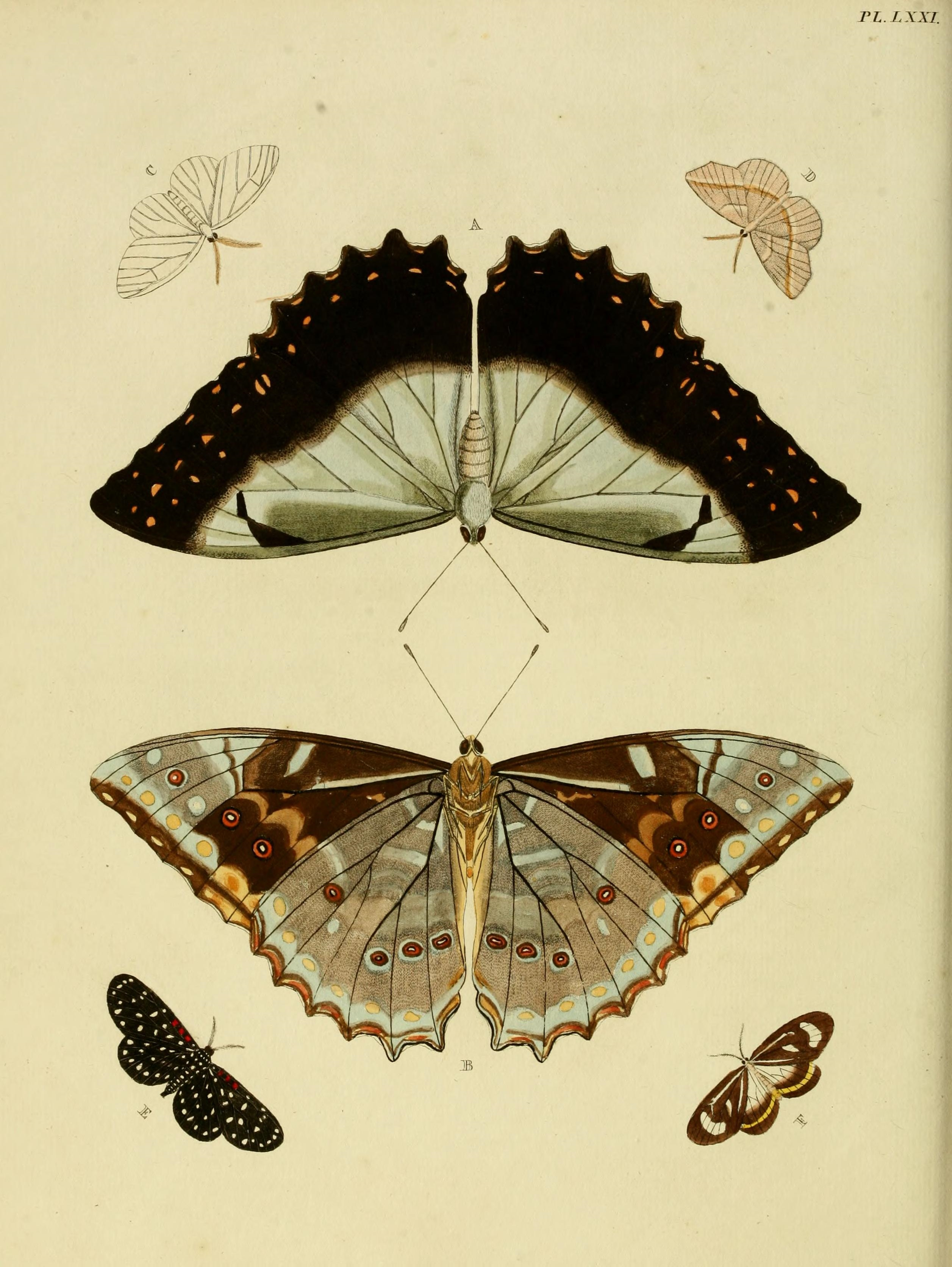

Scientific classification
- Kingdom: Animalia
- Phylum: Arthropoda
- Clade: Pancrustacea
- Class: Insecta
- Order: Lepidoptera
- Superfamily: Noctuoidea
- Family: Notodontidae
- Genus: Dioptis
- Species: D. meon

Binomial name
- Dioptis meon (Cramer, 1775)

Synonyms
- Bombyx meon Cramer, 1775; Dioptis beroea Moschler, 1877

= Dioptis meon =

Species of moth

Dioptis meon is a moth of the family Notodontidae first described by Pieter Cramer in 1775. It is found in Guyana and Suriname.
