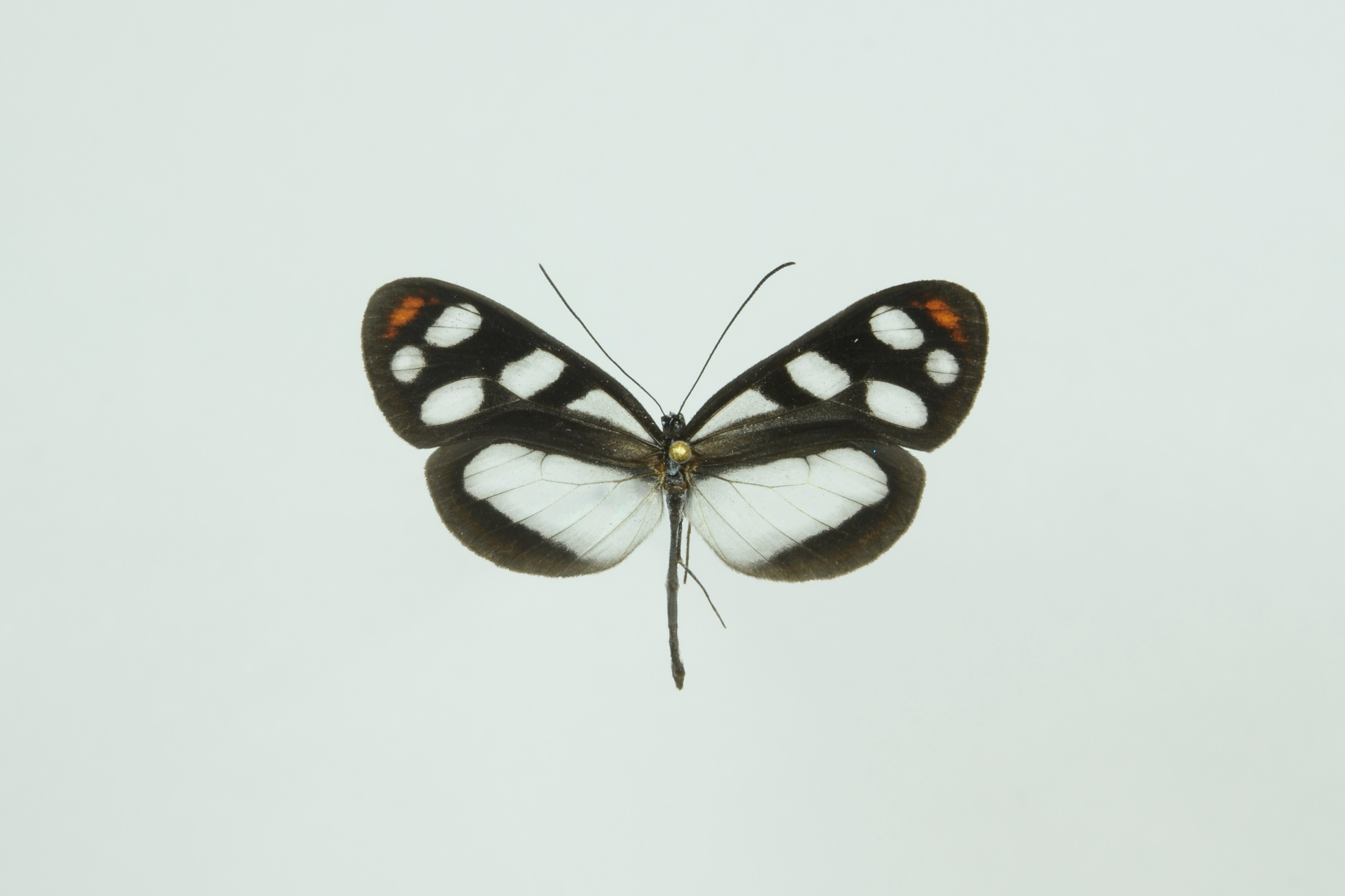

Scientific classification
- Domain: Eukaryota
- Kingdom: Animalia
- Phylum: Arthropoda
- Class: Insecta
- Order: Lepidoptera
- Family: Nymphalidae
- Genus: Oleria
- Species: O. onega

Binomial name
- Oleria onega (Hewitson, 1852)

Synonyms
- Ithomia onega Hewitson, 1851

= Oleria onega =

Species of butterfly

Oleria onega, the Onega clearwing or Onega glasswing, is a species of butterfly of the family Nymphalidae. It is found from Colombia to southern Peru.

The wingspan is about 52 millimetres (2.05 in).

The larvae feed on Solanum species.

== Subspecies ==
- Oleria onega onega (Brazil (Amazonas))
- Oleria onega ilerda (Hewitson, [1854]) (Colombia)
- Oleria onega epicharme (C. & R. Felder, 1862) (Brazil (Amazonas), Peru)
- Oleria onega janarilla (Hewitson, 1863) (Ecuador)
- Oleria onega crispinilla (Hopffer, 1874) (Peru)
- Oleria onega perspicua (Butler, 1877) (Brazil (Amazonas))
- Oleria onega lerida (Kirby, 1878) (Ecuador)
- Oleria onega janarilla (Hewitson, 1863)
- Oleria onega bocca (Riley, 1919) (Brazil (Amazonas))
- Oleria onega lentita Lamas, 1985 (Peru)
