= Meon (philosophy) =

Philosophical category

Meon is a philosophical category which is one of the forms of unformed being or a pure potency.

The term is Greek (μὴ ὄν) and stems from Ancient Greek philosophy, it is one of the forms of nothing. It was used by pre-socratics, then by sophists as well as Plato and Aristotle in their elaboration of matter. Neoplatonics also used this term. Greek me- means negation (as well as a- (e.g. atheism, see alpha privativum) and u- (as in utopia). "on" means entity (as in ontology, palaeontology).

In Sergei Bulgakov, meon is God in its initial transcendence (secrecy, non-manifestation) and non-personality (see Ain Soph). The adjective for meon is "meonic" (e.g., "meonic night of non-being"). Bulgakov contrasts meon to oukon (οὐκ ὄν)— a "barren, sterile, Parmenidean nothing". Here meon is a Superbeing analogous to tao and nirvana.

Before Bulgakov meon was elaborated by Nikolai Minsky, who formulated "meonism" in his In the Light of Conscience: Thoughts and Dreams about the Purpose of Life (1880). Meons can be spatial (atom, Universe), temporal (moment and eternity) or are categories (Absolute, selfless love, unlimited knowledge, free will, etc.). Meons unite in the One. The One (God) decides on an act of self-sacrifice and voluntarily goes into oblivion (becomes non-existent, meon), allowing our world to exist. Meons are comprehended through phenomena. Later the category of the meonal acquired the meaning of “pure potentiality, the absence of actual embodiment”.

In imiaslavie (and in Aleksei Losev) meon is connected to matter. Meonization is materialization, and meonic-temporal resists aeonic (eternal).
