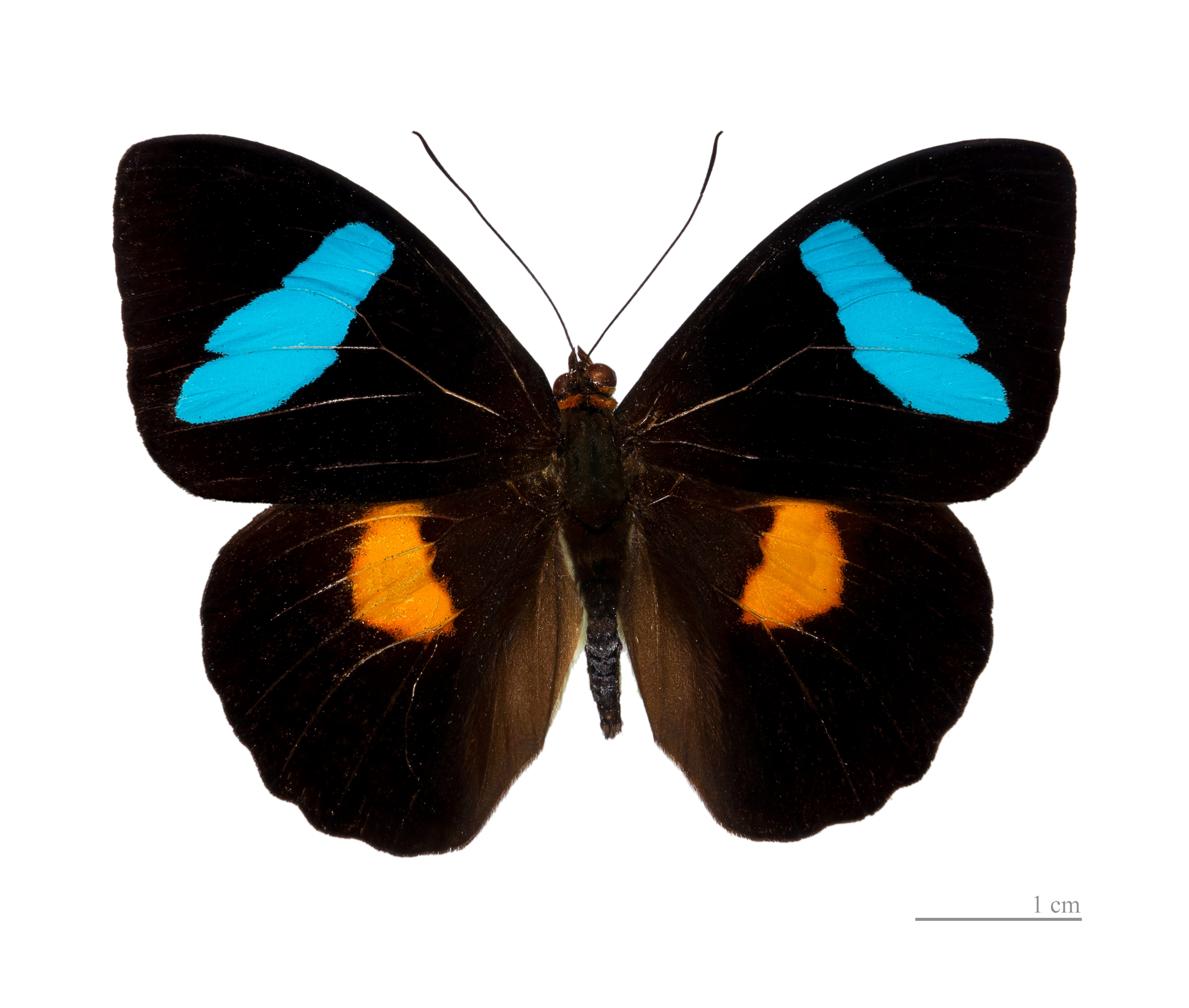
- From MHNT
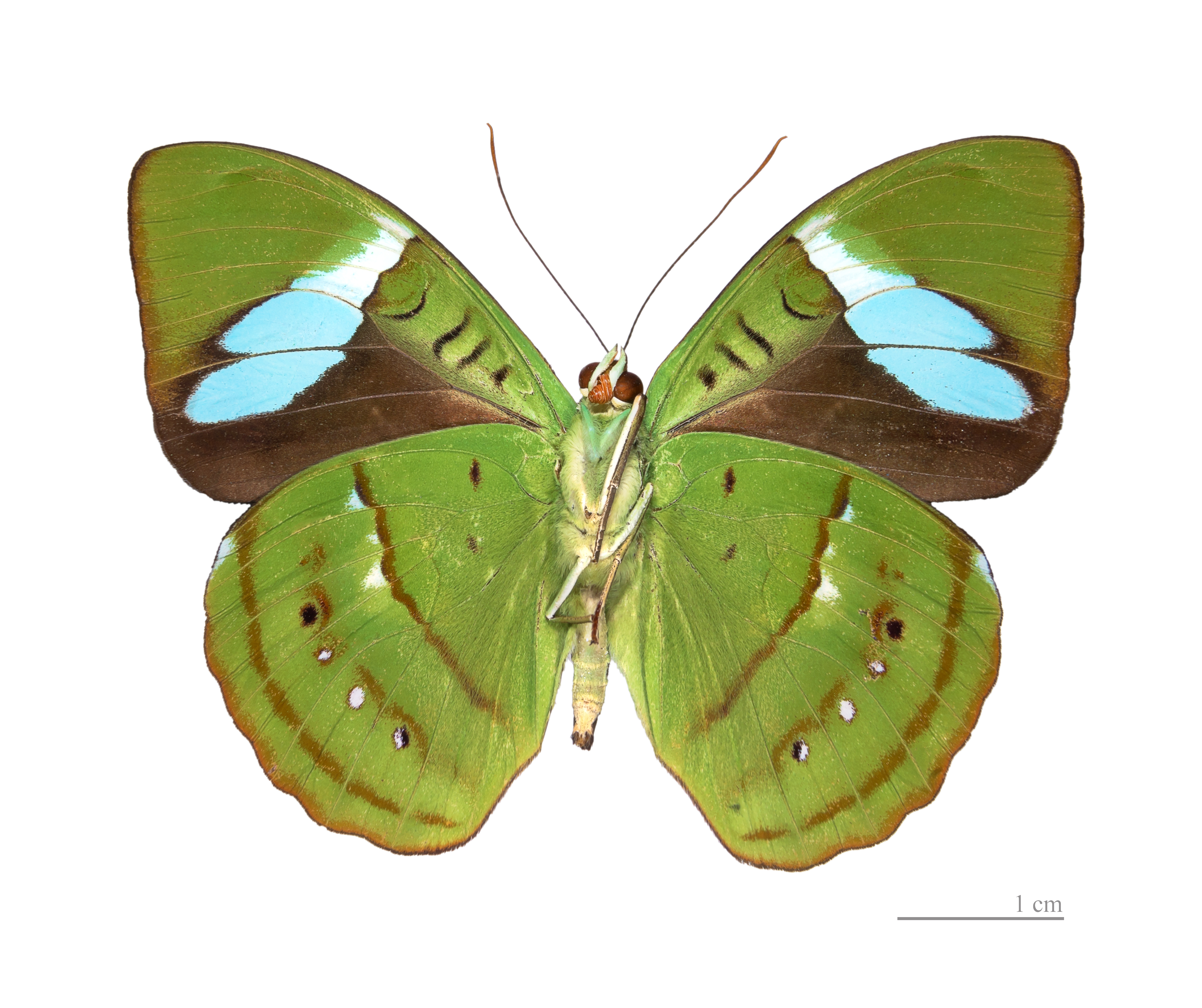
- Underside

Scientific classification
- Domain: Eukaryota
- Kingdom: Animalia
- Phylum: Arthropoda
- Class: Insecta
- Order: Lepidoptera
- Family: Nymphalidae
- Genus: Nessaea
- Species: N. batesii

Binomial name
- Nessaea batesii (C. & R. Felder, 1860)

Synonyms
- Epicalia batesii C. & R. Felder, 1860; Nessaea batesi

= Nessaea batesii =

Species of butterfly

Nessaea batesii, the Bates olivewing, is a species of butterfly of the family Nymphalidae. It is found in eastern Venezuela, the Guianas and the lower Amazon in Brazil.

The length of the wings is 29–36 mm for males and 32–40 mm for females.

== Subspecies ==
- Nessaea batesii batesii (Brazil (Pará))
- Nessaea batesii magniplaga Röber, 1928 (Suriname)
