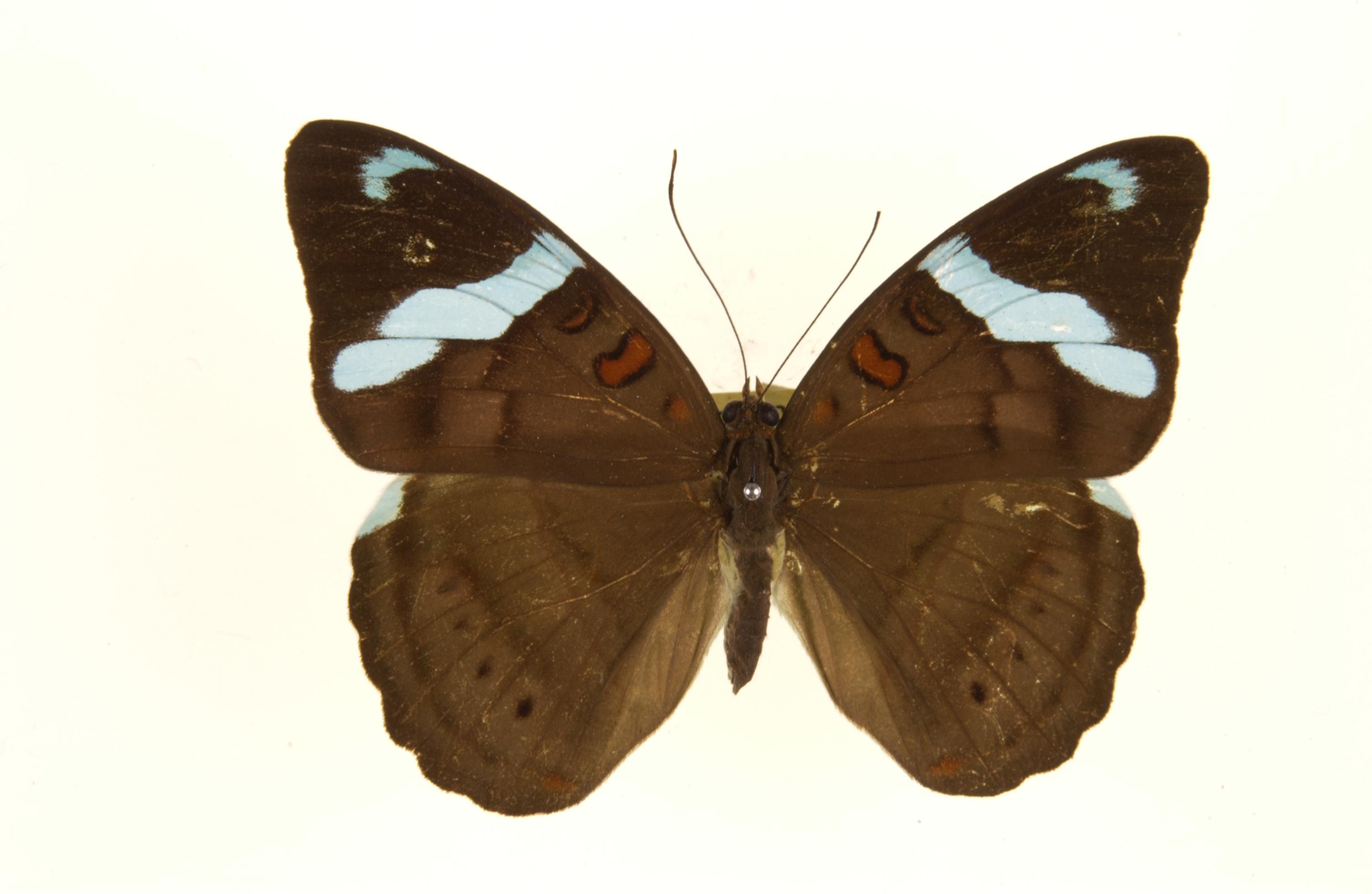
- Female
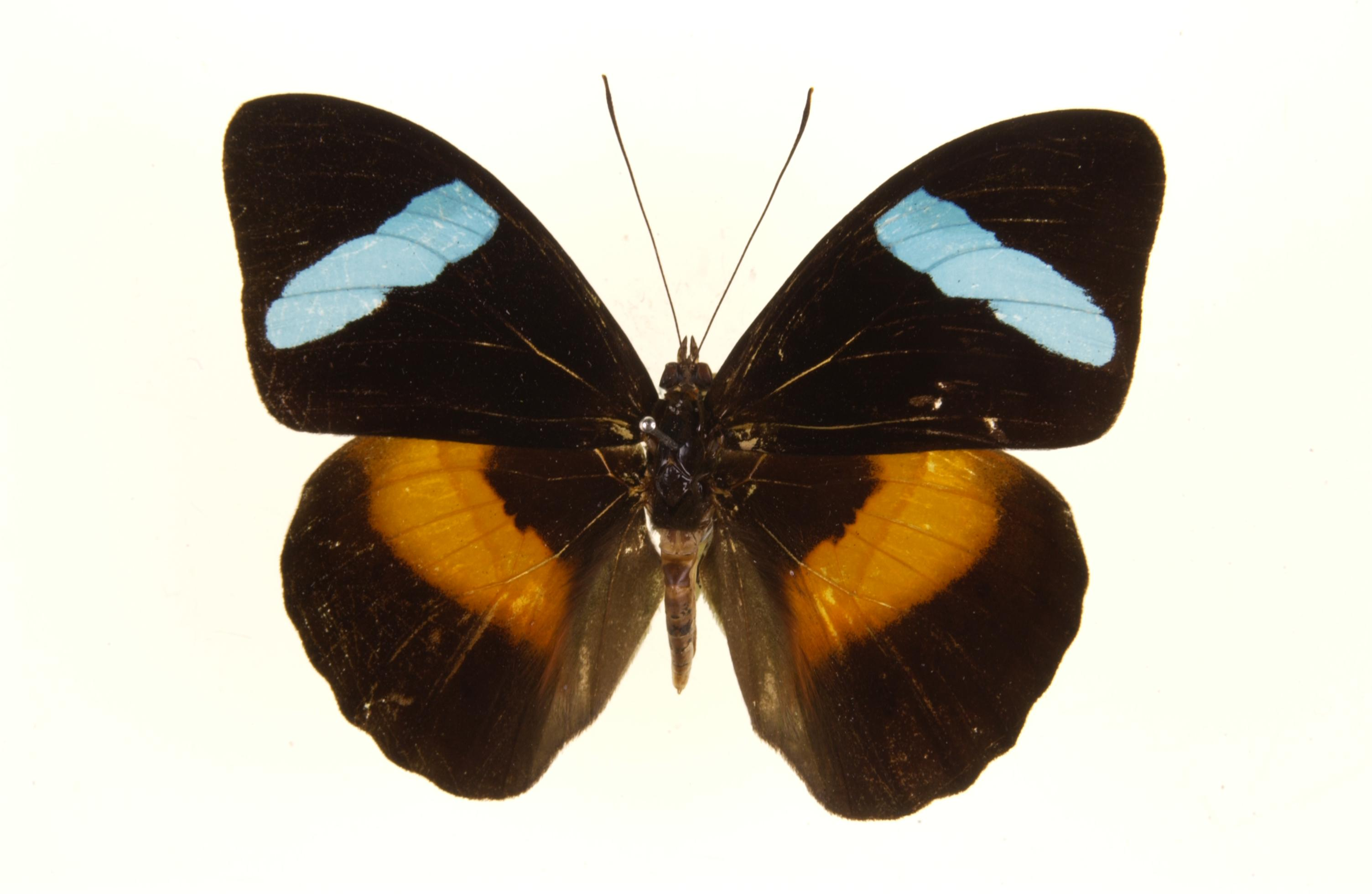
- Male

Scientific classification
- Kingdom: Animalia
- Phylum: Arthropoda
- Class: Insecta
- Order: Lepidoptera
- Family: Nymphalidae
- Genus: Nessaea
- Species: N. obrinus

Binomial name
- Nessaea obrinus (Linnaeus, 1758)

Synonyms
- Papilio obrinus Linnaeus, 1758; Papilio ancaeus Linnaeus, 1758; Nessaea obrinus latifascia Röber, 1928; Nessaea obrinus romani Bryk, 1953; Nessaea obrina

= Nessaea obrinus =

Species of butterfly

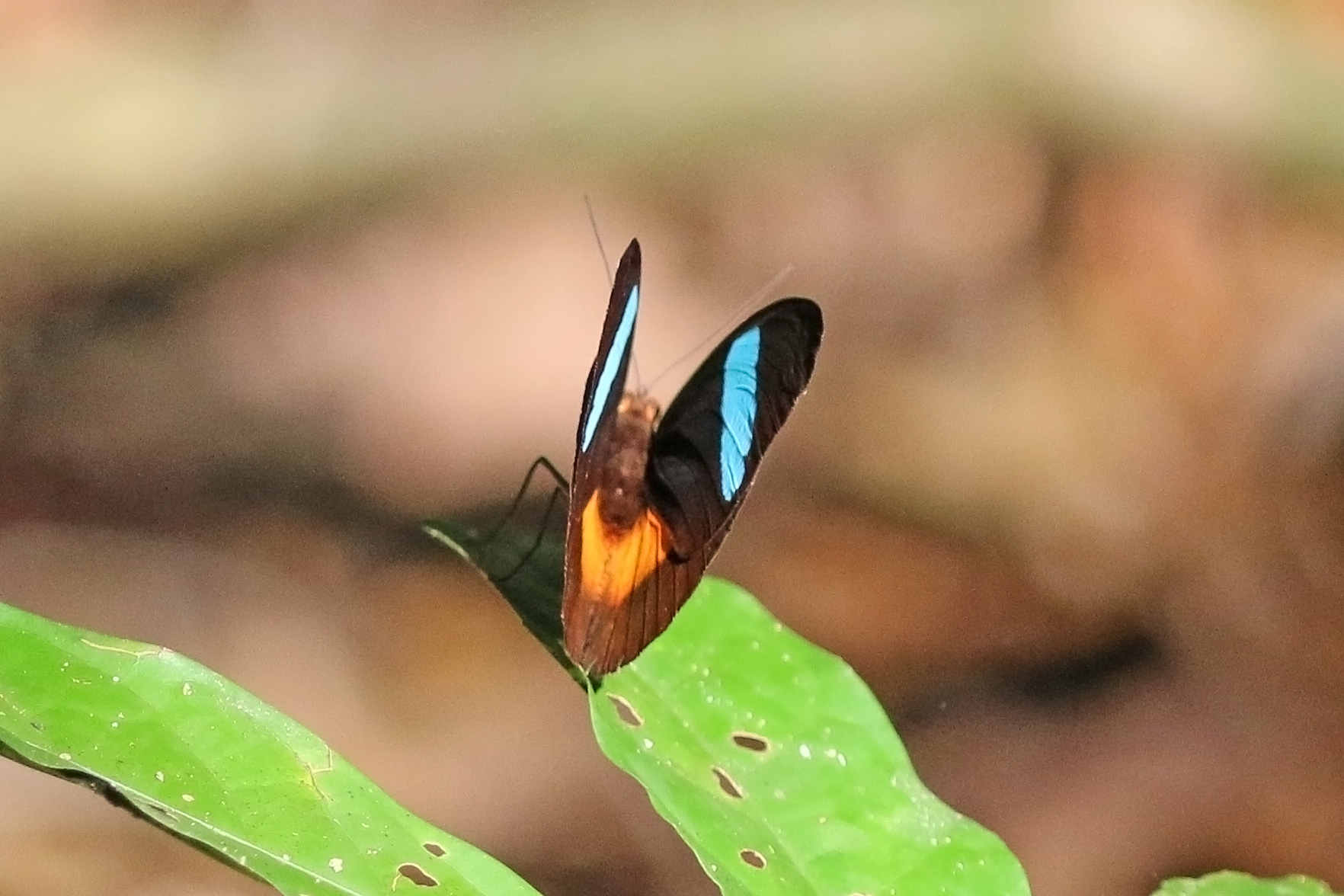
N. o. faventia, Brazil

Nessaea obrinus, the obrina olivewing, is a species of butterfly of the family Nymphalidae. It is found from Colombia and the Guianas to the mouth of the Amazon and south to central Bolivia and Mato Grosso in Brazil, extending to northern Argentina.

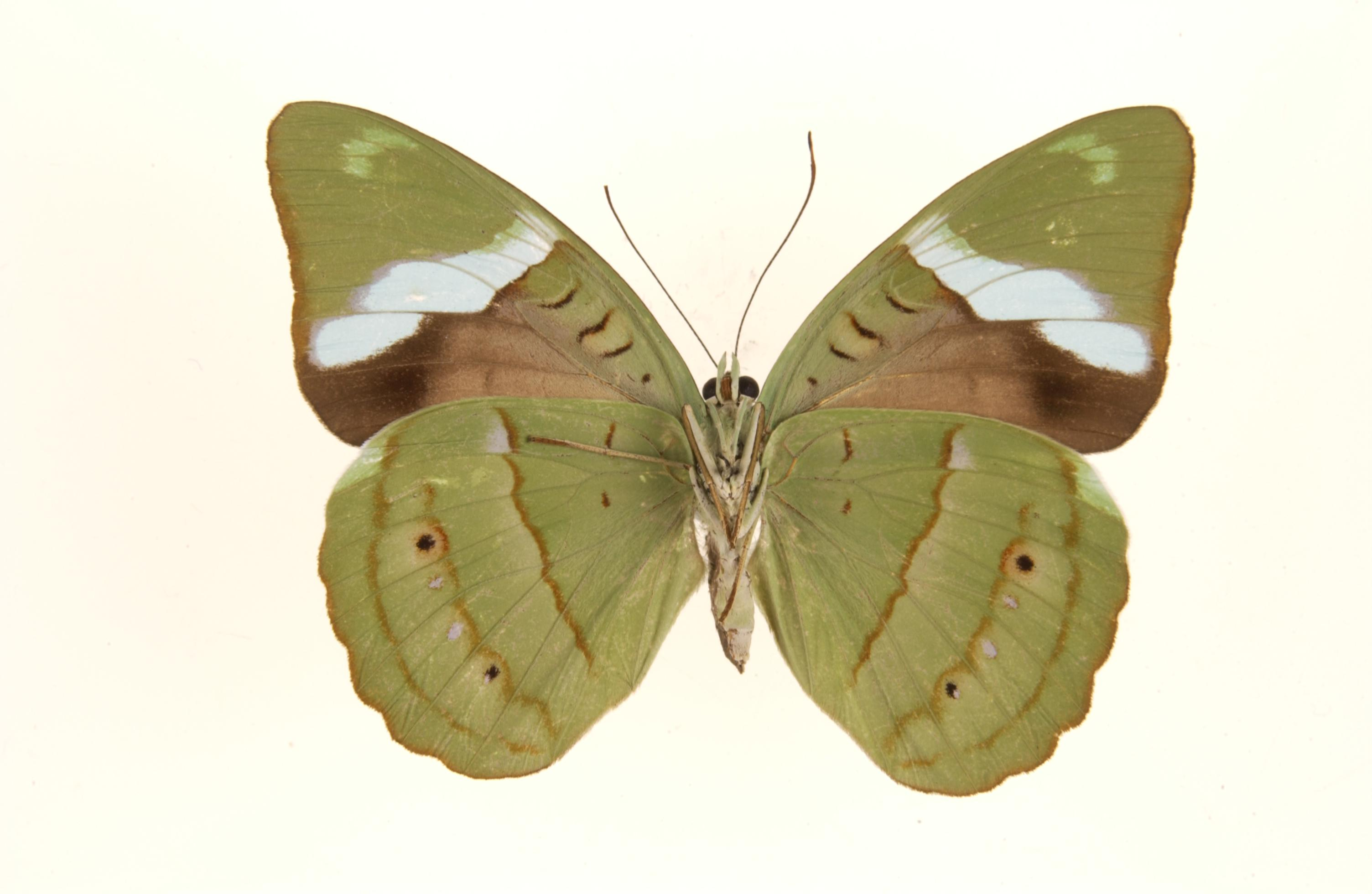
Underside

The length of the wings is 25–40 mm for males and 26–41 mm for females. Adults of subspecies obrinus are on wing in January and from July to November. Adults of subspecies faventia are on wing year round, but mainly from June to October and adults of subspecies lesoudieri are on wing year round, with no observed peak of abundance.

== Blue pigmentation ==
Obrina Olivewing butterflies are very unusual because they are one of the few animals with actual blue pigment. Most other species get their blue coloration from a process called coherent scattering, in which scattered light waves interfere to create a blue color. All the other species of Nessaea get their blue coloration from the pigment pterobilin. Pterobilin also provides blue for Graphium agamemnon, G. antiphates, G. doson, and G. sarpedon. Other butterflies in Graphium and Papilio (specifically P. phorcas and P. weiskei) use the blue pigments phorcabilin and sarpedobilin.

== Subspecies ==
- Nessaea obrinus obrinus (Guianas and in eastern Venezuela)
- Nessaea obrinus faventia Fruhstorfer, 1910 (Brazil (Mato Grosso), Bolivia)
- Nessaea obrinus lesoudieri Le Moult, 1933 (Colombia, Ecuador, Peru, Bolivia, Brazil (Amazonas))
