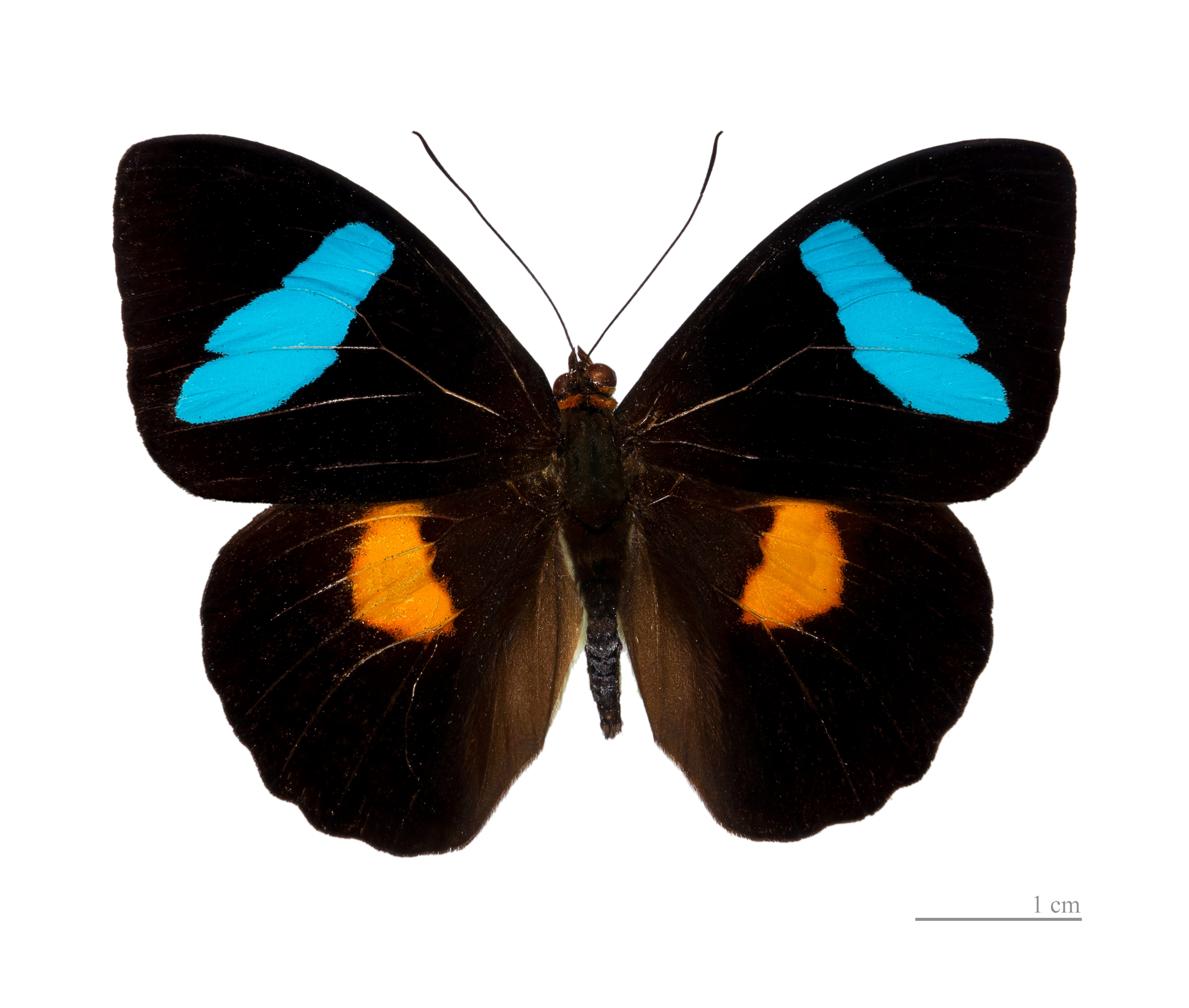
- Nessaea batesii from French Guiana

Scientific classification
- Kingdom: Animalia
- Phylum: Arthropoda
- Class: Insecta
- Order: Lepidoptera
- Family: Nymphalidae
- Tribe: Epicaliini
- Genus: Nessaea; Hübner, 1819

Type species
- Papilio ancaeus Linnaeus, 1758

Species
- Nessaea aglaura Doubleday [1848]; Nessaea ecuadorensis Talbot 1932; Nessaea batesii C. & R. Felder 1860; Nessaea magniplaga Röber 1928; Nessaea hewitsonii C. & R. Felder 1859; Nessaea obrinus Linnaeus 1758; Nessaea faventia Fruhstorfer 1910; Nessaea latifascia Röber 1928; Nessaea romani Bryk 1953; Nessaea regina Salvin 1869; Nessaea thalia Bargmann 1928

Synonyms
- Epicallia Erichson, 1848 (non Hübner, [1820]: preoccupied); Polychroa Billberg, 1820

= Nessaea =

Genus of brush-footed butterflies

Nessaea is a genus of nymphalid butterflies found in the Neotropical realm. Unlike virtually all other butterflies with blue coloration, the blue colors in this genus are due to pigmentation [pterobilin (biliverdin IXγ)] rather than iridescence (e.g., Morpho species).

== Species ==
Accepted species:

- Nessaea aglaura Doubleday [1848] – common olivewing, northern nessaea or Aglaura olivewing
- Nessaea ecuadorensis Talbot 1932
- Nessaea batesii C. & R. Felder 1860 – Bates olivewing
- Nessaea magniplaga Röber 1928
- Nessaea hewitsonii C. & R. Felder 1859 – Hewitson's olivewing
- Nessaea obrinus Linnaeus 1758 – obrina olivewing
- Nessaea faventia Fruhstorfer 1910
- Nessaea latifascia Röber 1928
- Nessaea romani Bryk 1953
- Nessaea regina Salvin 1869
- Nessaea thalia Bargmann 1928

Unaccepted species:

- Nessaea margaretha Krüger 1933 - unavailable name and infrasubspecific name
- Nessaea ancaeus Linnaeus 1767 - junior subjective synonym
- Nessaea lesoudieri Le Moult 1933 - junior subjective synonym
- Nessaea coniuncta Krüger 1933 - unavailable name and infrasubspecific name

== Images ==
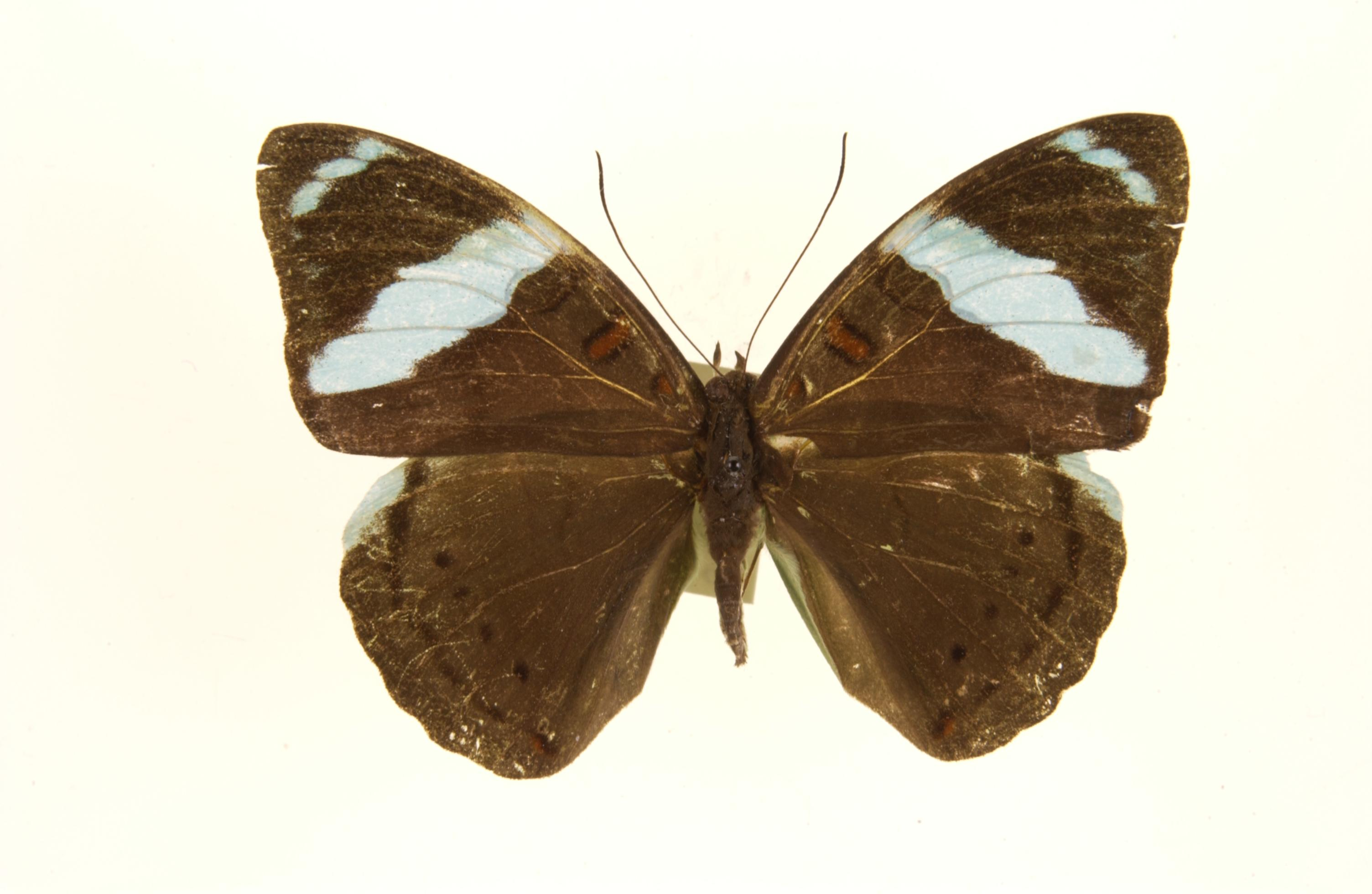
Nessaea aglaura

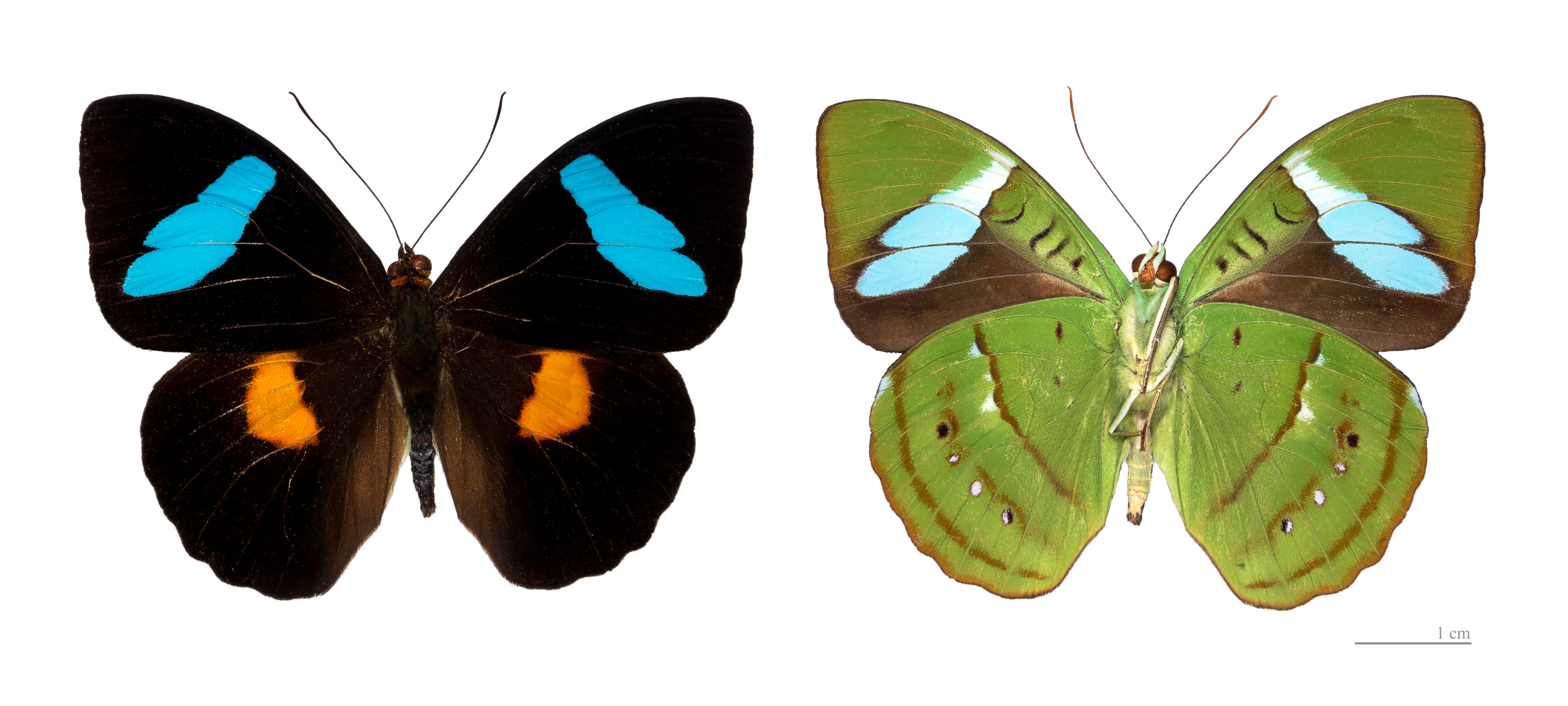
Nessaea batesii males

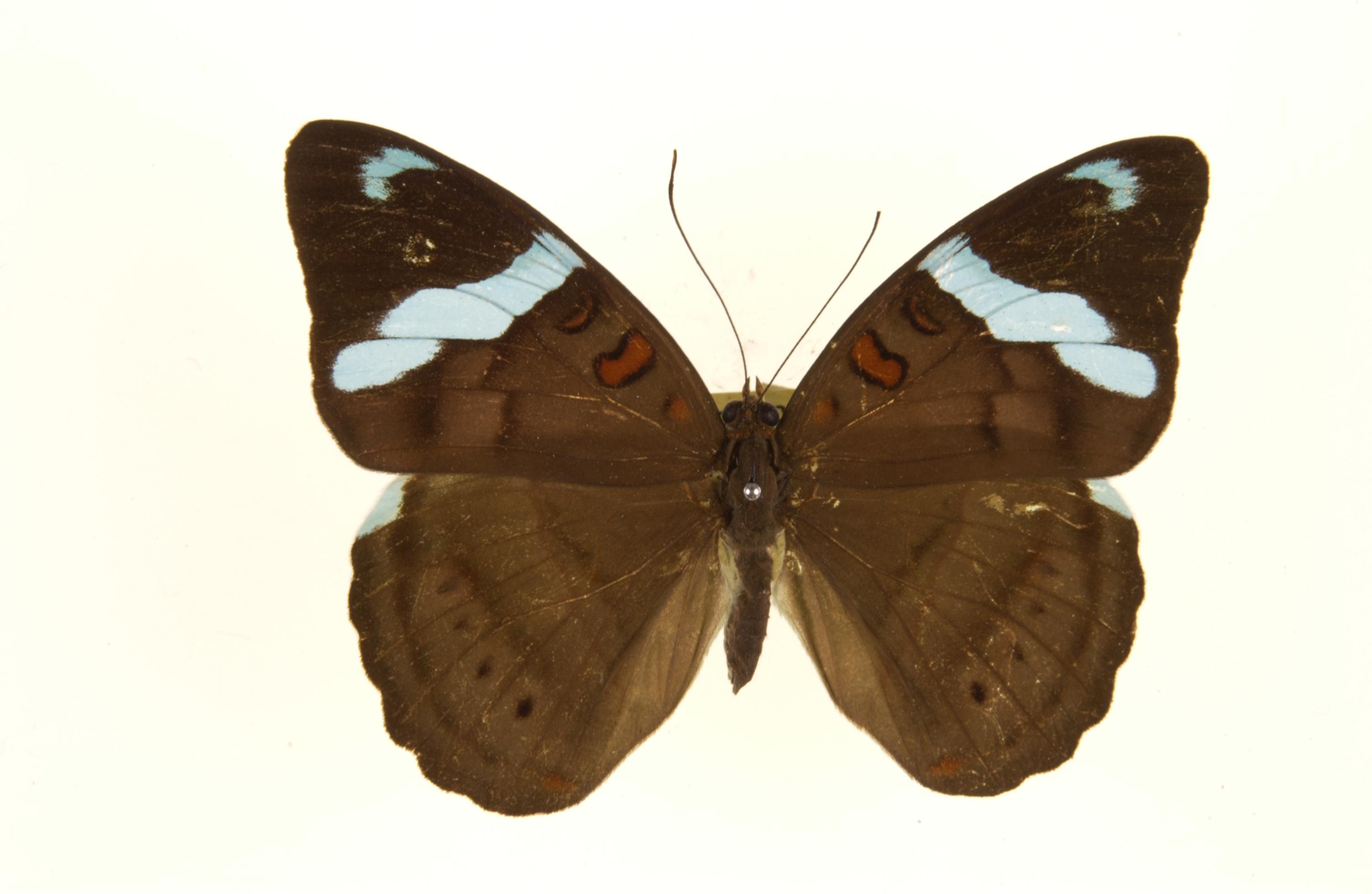
Nessaea obrinus female - upperside

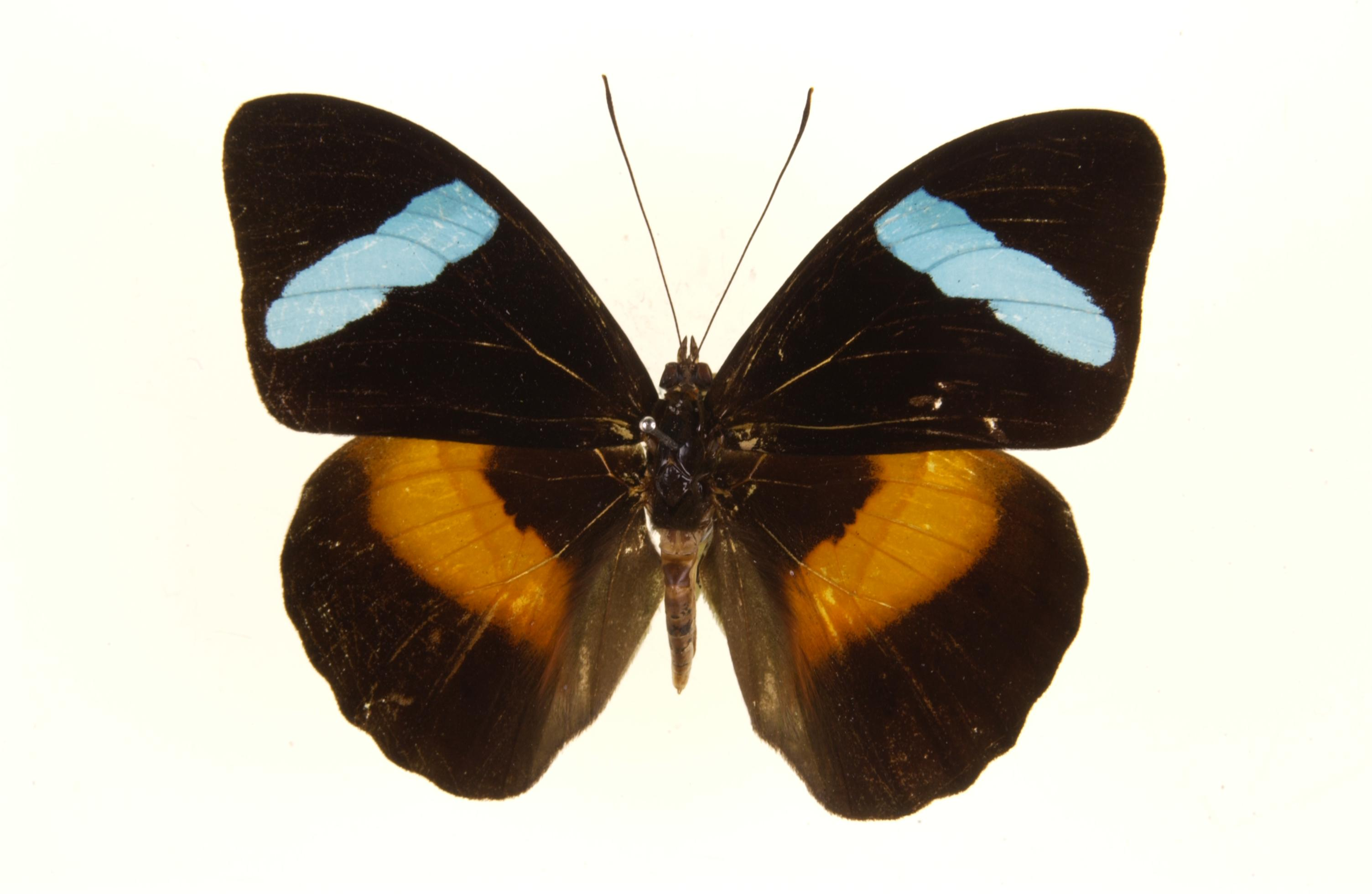
Nessaea obrinus male - upperside

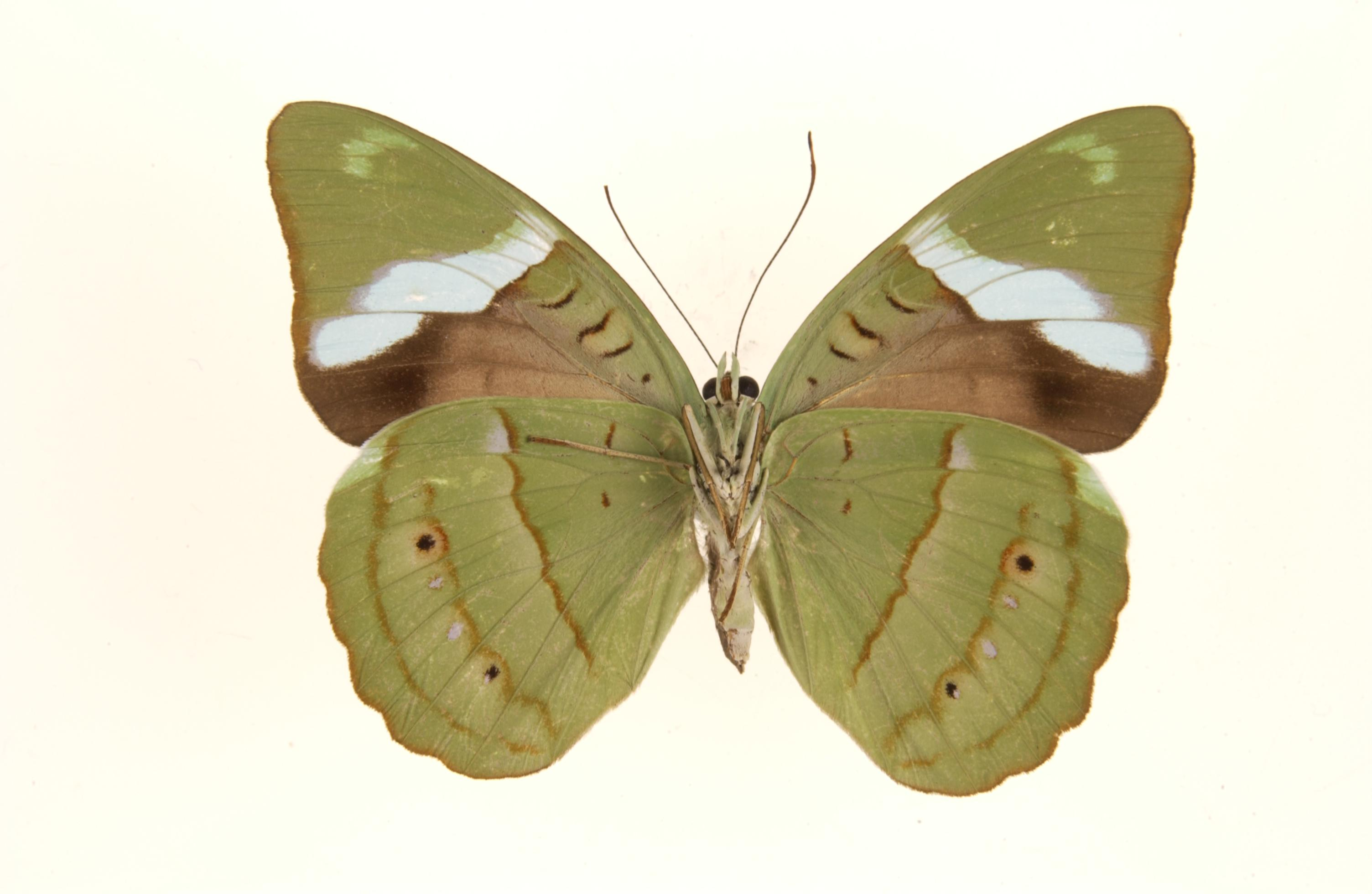
Nessaea obrinus - underside

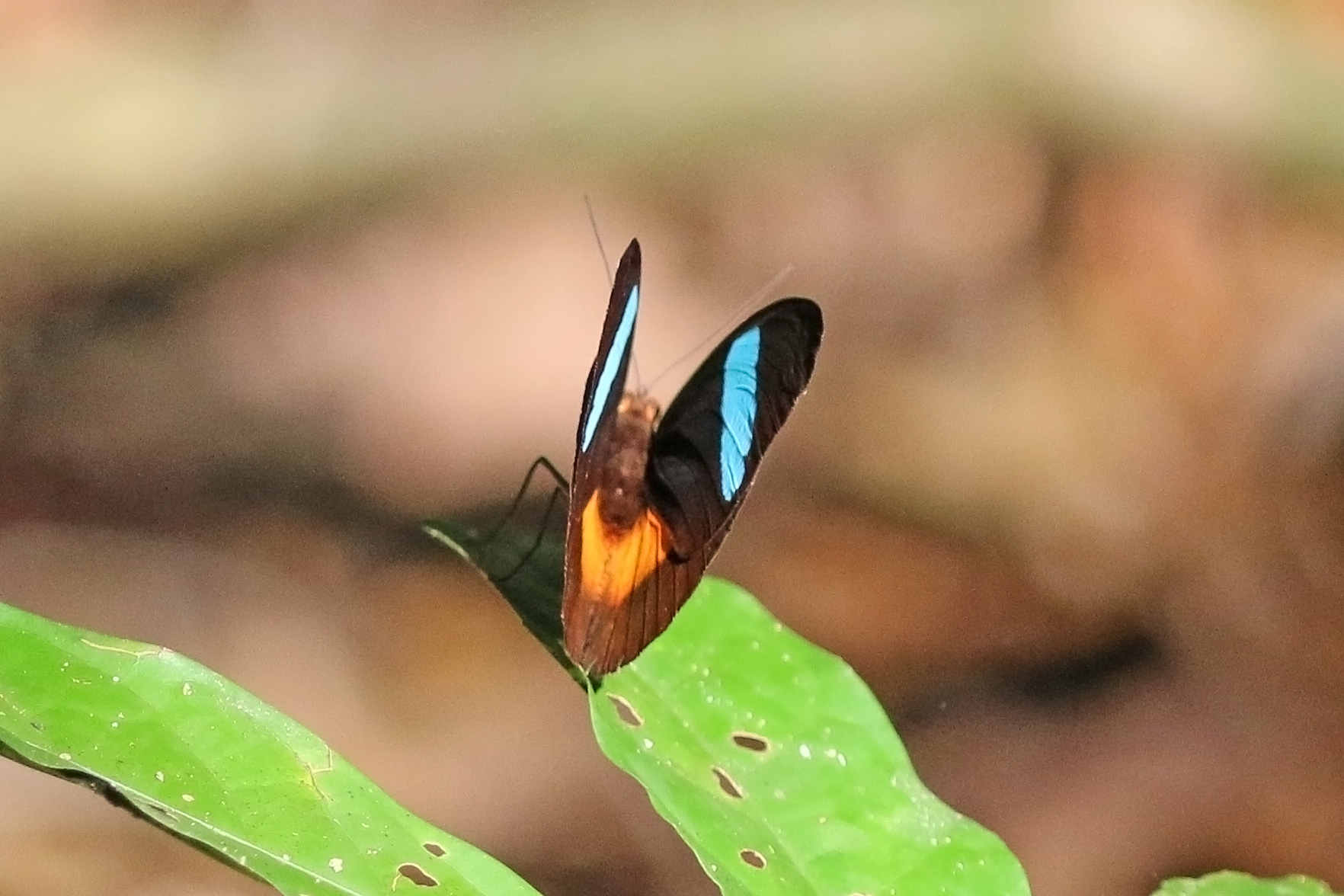
Obrinus olivewing (N. obrinus faventia, male, Brazil

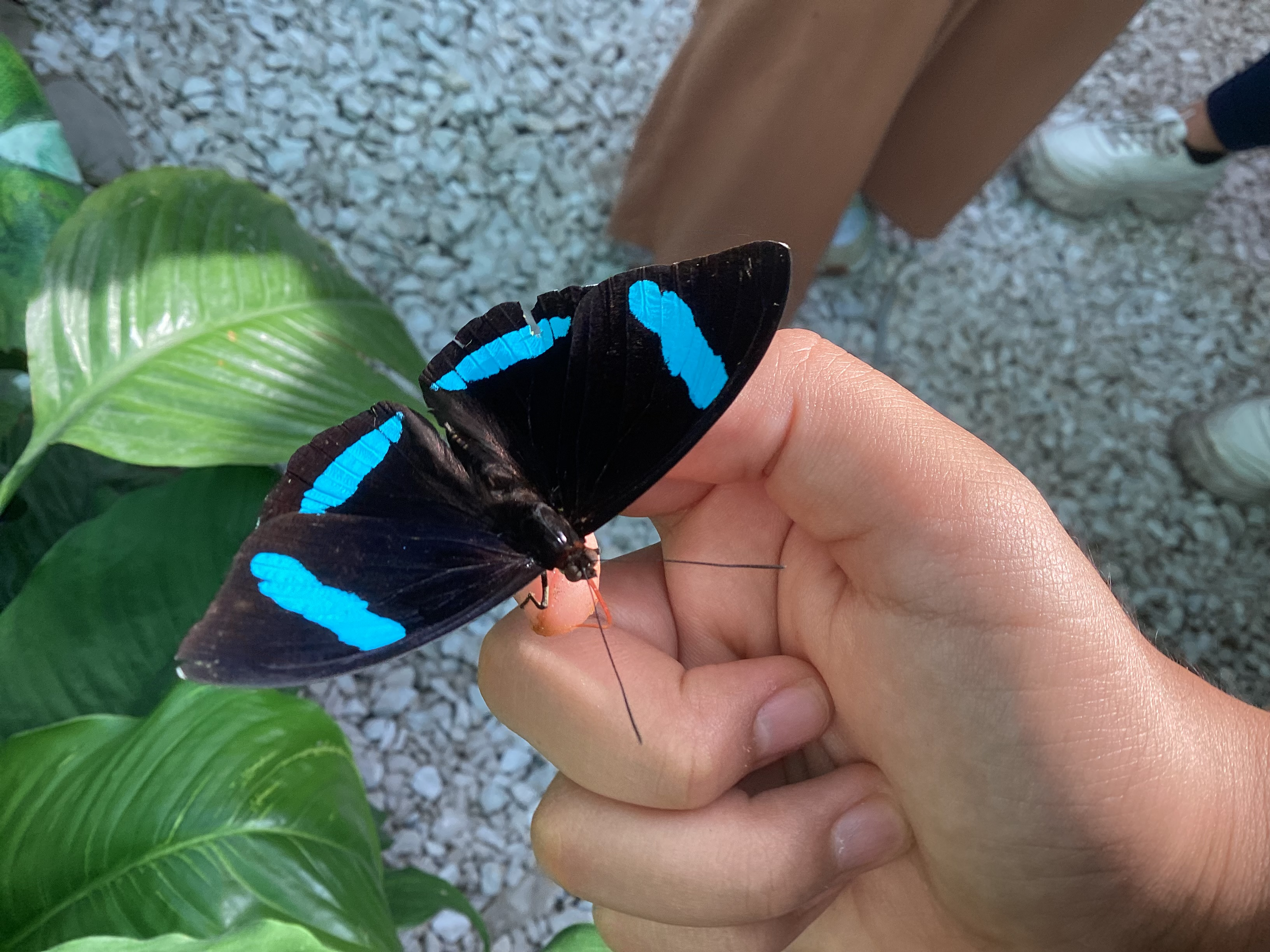
Nessaea hewitsonii
