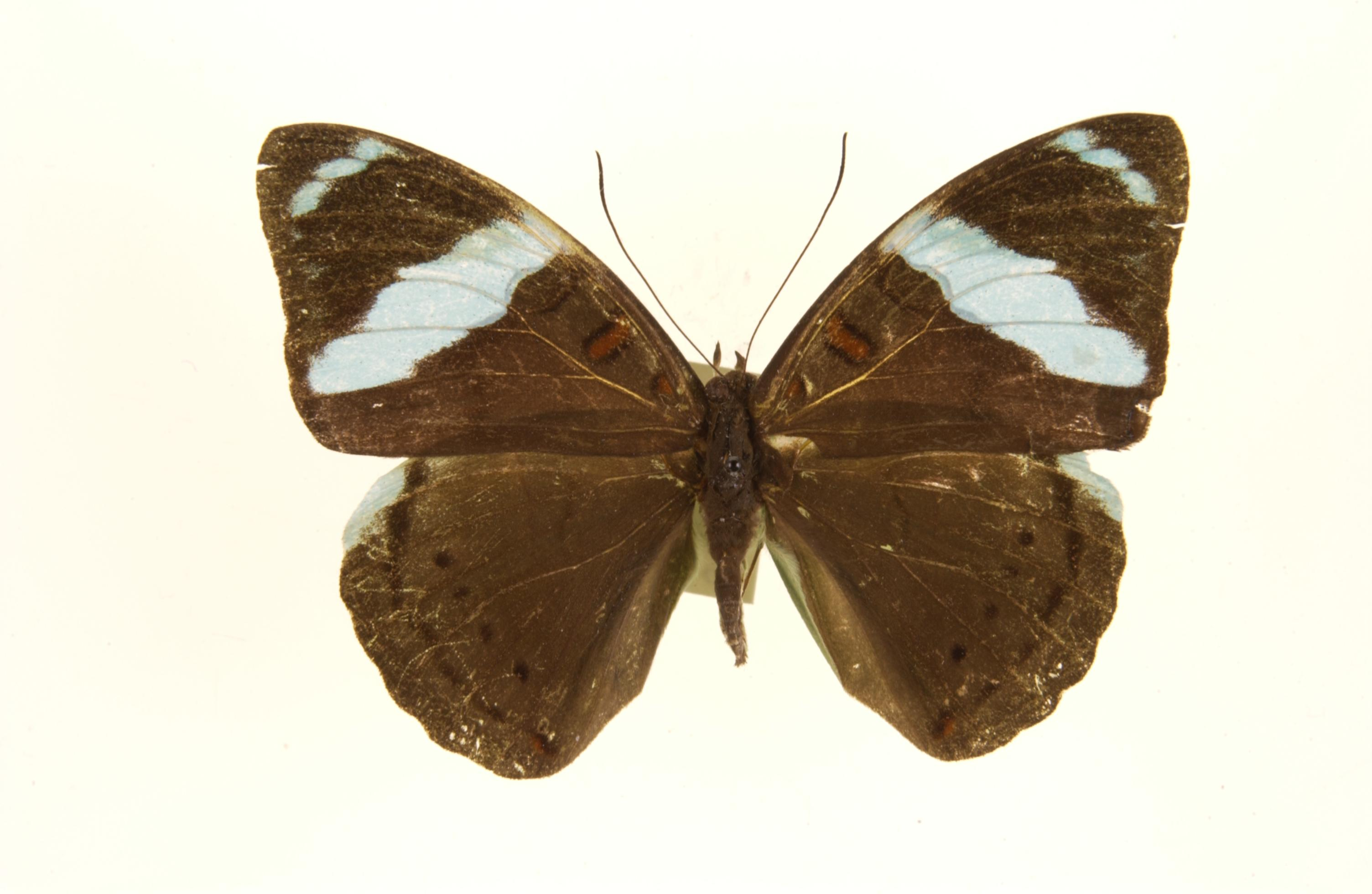

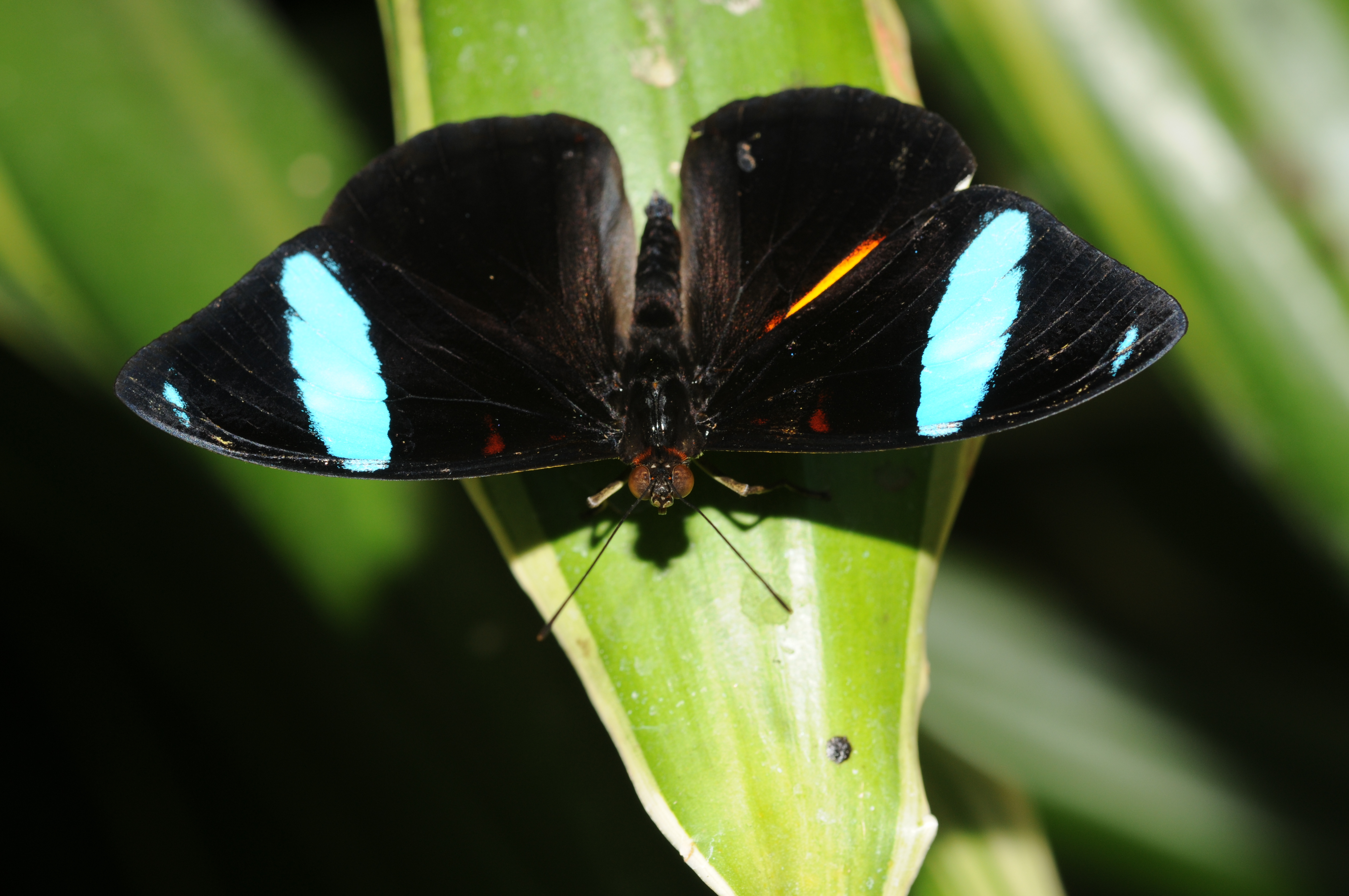

Scientific classification
- Domain: Eukaryota
- Kingdom: Animalia
- Phylum: Arthropoda
- Class: Insecta
- Order: Lepidoptera
- Family: Nymphalidae
- Genus: Nessaea
- Species: N. aglaura

Binomial name
- Nessaea aglaura (Doubleday, [1848])

Synonyms
- Epicalia aglaura Doubleday, [1848]; Epicalia regina Salvin, 1869; Nessaea regina; Nessaea aglaura ecuadorensis Talbot, 1932

= Nessaea aglaura =

Common olivewing

Species of butterfly

Nessaea aglaura, the common olivewing, northern nessaea or Aglaura olivewing, is a species of butterfly of the family Nymphalidae. It is found from Mexico to Panama, Ecuador, Venezuela and Colombia. It is found in evergreen tropical forest and in semi-deciduous tropical forest.

The length of the wings is 31–34 mm for males and 28–36 mm for females. Adults are on wing nearly year round.

They are notable for the presence of blue pigments in their wings, as opposed to blue created by physical structures.

The larvae feed on Alchornea costaricensis and Plukenetia volubilis.

== Subspecies ==
- Nessaea aglaura aglaura (Mexico to Panama and Ecuador)
- Nessaea aglaura regina (Salvin, 1869) (Venezuela, Colombia)
- Nessaea aglaura thalia Bargmann, 1928 (Colombia, Ecuador)
