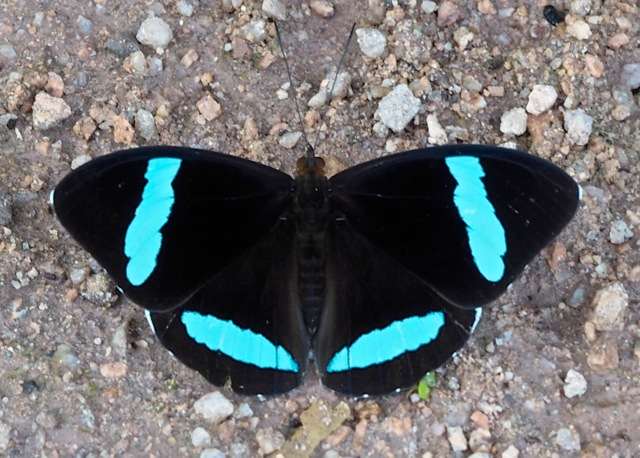
- upper side
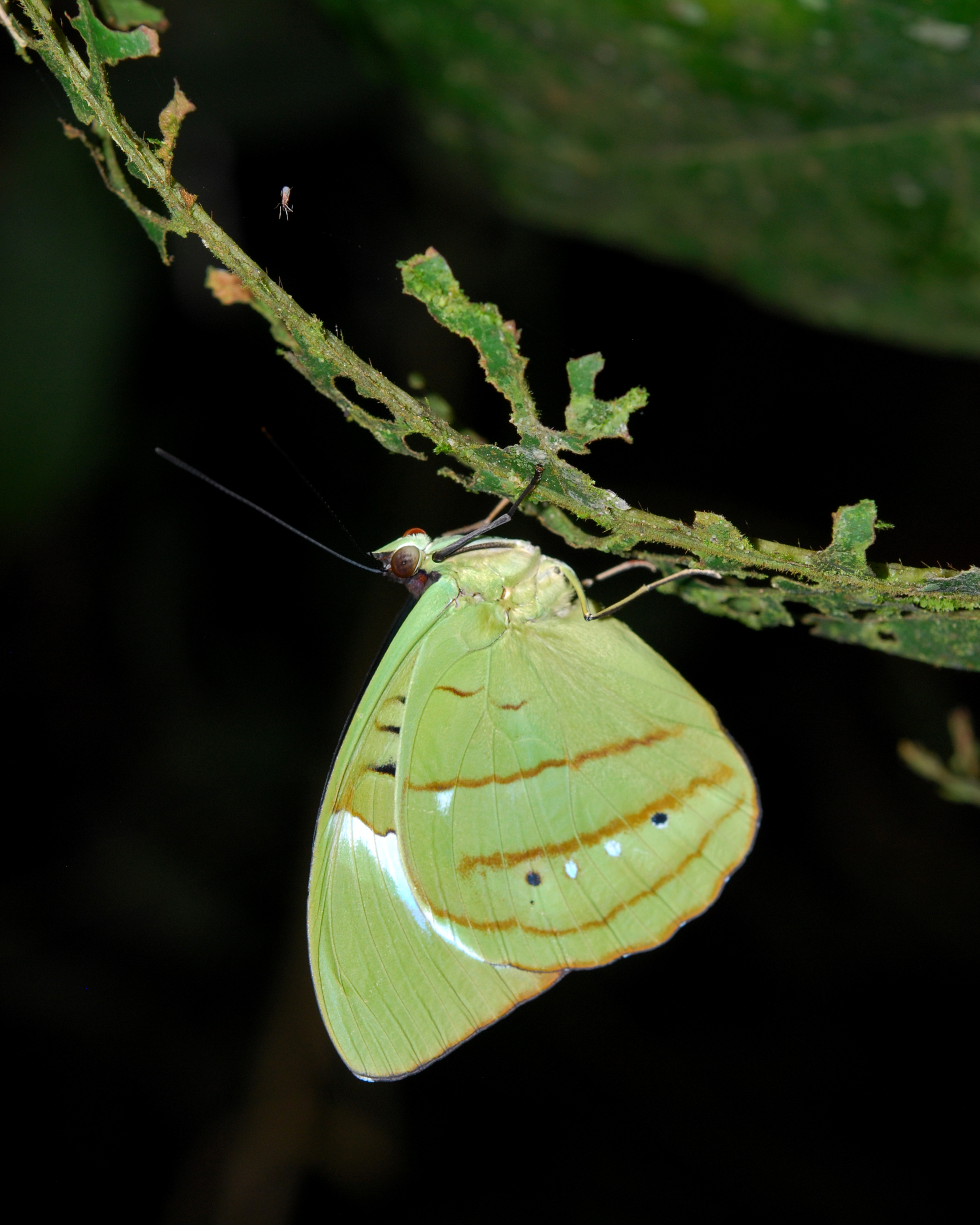
- underside

Scientific classification
- Domain: Eukaryota
- Kingdom: Animalia
- Phylum: Arthropoda
- Class: Insecta
- Order: Lepidoptera
- Family: Nymphalidae
- Genus: Nessaea
- Species: N. hewitsonii

Binomial name
- Nessaea hewitsonii (C. & R. Felder, 1859)

Synonyms
- Epicalia hewitsonii C. & R. Felder, 1859; Nessaea hewitsoni

= Nessaea hewitsonii =

Hewitson's olivewing

Species of butterfly

Nessaea hewitsonii, the Hewitson's olivewing, is a species of butterfly of the family Nymphalidae. It is common in a broad range of the Amazon basin including the eastern slopes of the Andes mountain range. It is found in high evergreen tropical forest, semi-deciduous tropical forest, and riverine forest.

The length of the wings is 33–40 mm for males and 36–41 mm for females.

== Subspecies ==
- Nessaea hewitsonii hewitsonii (from Colombia, Ecuador and Peru eastward into the Amazon valley, and south to Rondonia, Brazil)
- Nessaea hewitsonii boliviensis Jenkins, 1989 (Bolivia and southern Peru)

== Gallery ==
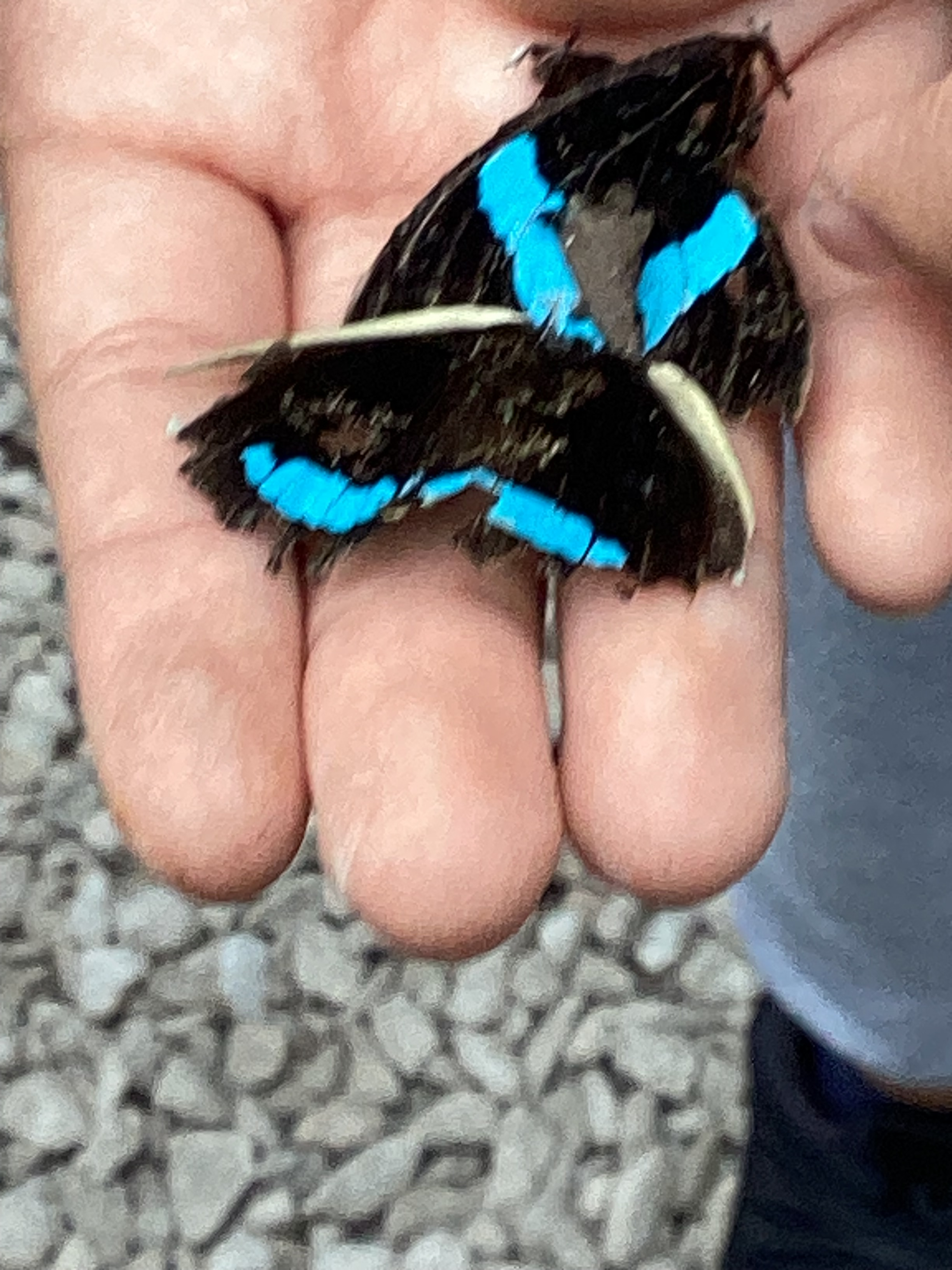
A dead individual due to predation.

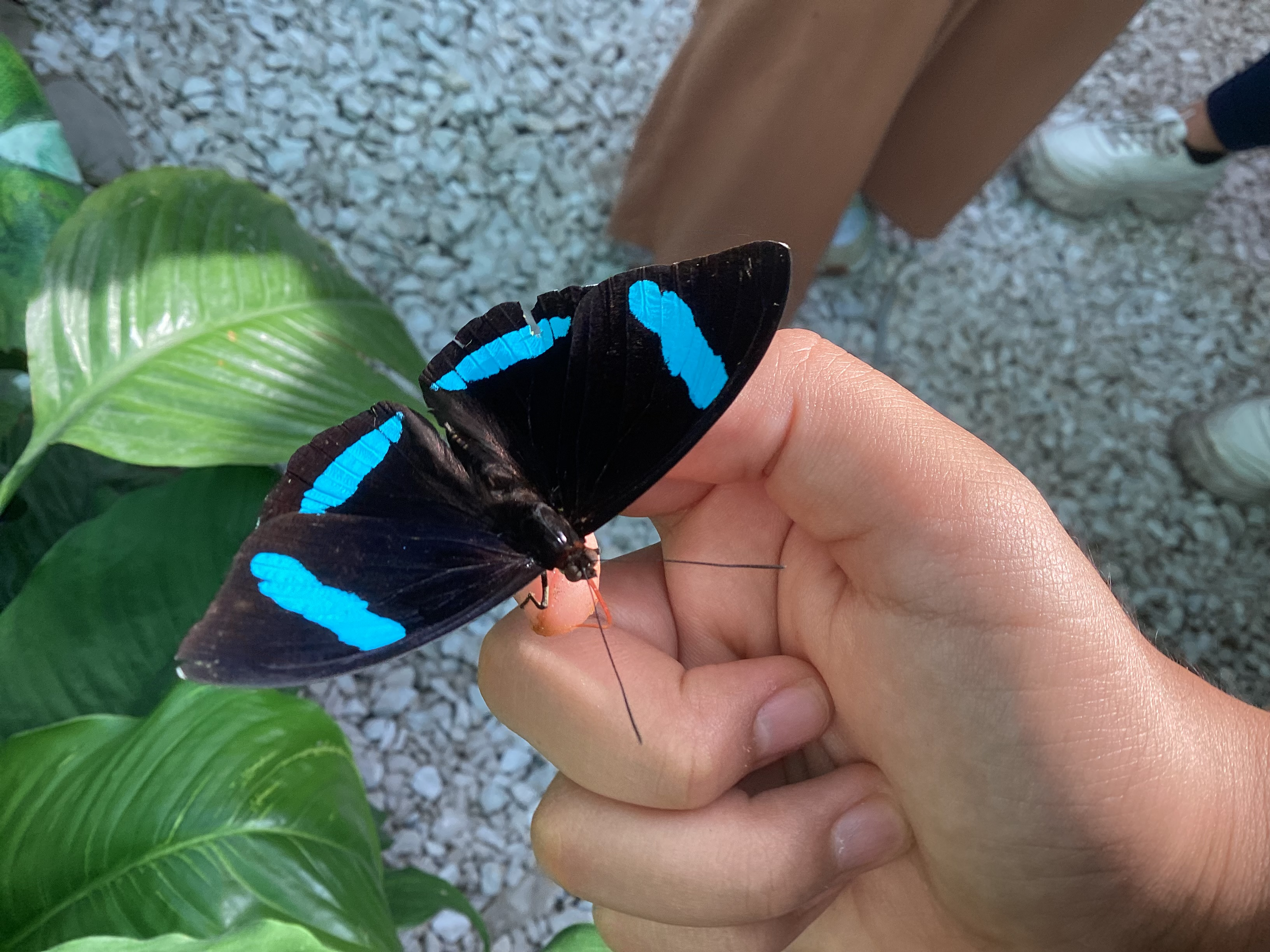
A captive specimen
