= Butterfly Creek (zoo) =

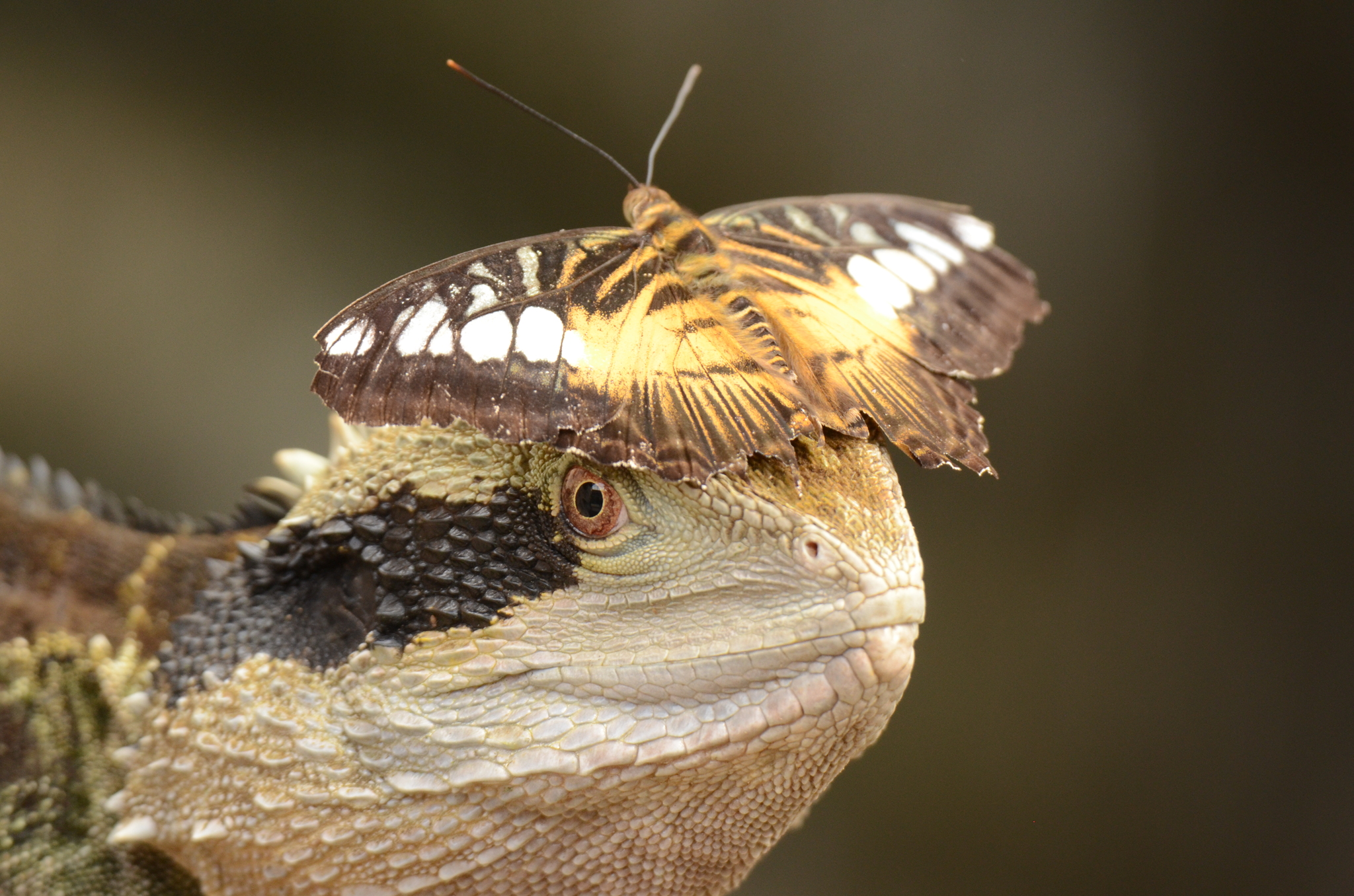
- Parthenos sylvia resting on an eastern water dragon at Butterfly Creek
- Interactive map of Butterfly Creek
- 36.9994°S 174.7947°E
- Date opened: November 2003
- Location: 10 Tom Pearce Drive, Auckland Airport, Auckland, New Zealand
- Land area: 8 acres
- No. of species: ~60
- Memberships: Zoo and Aquarium Association
- Website: www.butterflycreek.co.nz

Butterfly Creek is a wildlife facility located adjacent to Auckland Airport, Auckland, New Zealand. Opening in November 2003, the facility primarily exhibits exotic species, including a butterfly garden and two saltwater crocodiles, the only members of their species kept in New Zealand.

== History ==
Situated on approximately 8 acres (3.2 ha) of land, it was initially established as a walk-through butterfly garden (the butterfly house remaining the flagship attraction of the place) and has now expanded to having a number of both native and exotic animal species including two saltwater crocodiles (the only two of their species to be kept in New Zealand) named Goldie and Scar. These were brought from Australia in 2009 after initially being removed from the wild by wildlife authorities, after concerns for locals and livestock in the area. The park has become regarded as a secondary zoo for people living in the Auckland city region as-well as a tourist attraction for visiting domestic and international visitors due to its location near the airport. Another feature of the park stated to be a significant drawcard of visitation is lifelike replicas of extinct and mythical creatures such as the extinct moa bird of New Zealand, animatronic models of dinosaurs and models of some mythical creatures. These like the wildlife residence are exhibited throughout the gardens of the park.

== Wildlife exhibits ==
Butterfly House

- Arcas cattleheart
- Blue moon
- Blue morpho
- Great yellow mormon
- Paper kite
- Pink rose
- Postman butterfly
- Scarlet mormon
- The clipper
- Tiger longwing
- Yellow-edged giant owl
- (fish species convict cichlid and giant gourami live in the creek waterways in the exhibit too)

Crocodilians

- American alligator
- Saltwater crocodile

Reptiles

- Eastern blue-tongued skink
- Eastern water dragon
- Green iguana
- Inland bearded dragon
- Leopard tortoise
- Madagascar day gecko
- Red-bellied turtle
- (also found in these buildings are exhibits for Brazilian black tarantula, Peruvian pink-toe tarantula and butterfly pupae)
- Lace Monitor

Exotic Mammals

- Cotton-top tamarin
- Emperor tamarin
- Meerkat
- Small-clawed otter
- South African crested porcupine

Kiwi House

- North Island brown kiwi
- (some smaller exhibits for species of wētā at different times)

New Zealand Eels

- Shortfin eel

Buttermilk Farm

- Alpaca
- Budgerigar
- Domestic chicken
- Domestic rat
- Goat
- Guinea pig
- Ostrich
- Rabbit
- Sheep
- Sulphur-crested cockatoo

Tropical Marine Aquarium

- Blue tang
- Red coris wrasse
- Silver mono
- Yellow-tail blue damselfish

Tropical Freshwater Aquarium

- Black ghost knifefish
- Clown knifefish
- Clown loach
- Common plecostomus
- Cigar shark
- Flagtail
- Jaguar cichlid
- Oscar
- Red-tail plecostomus
- Royal plecostomus
- Sailfin plecostomus
- Silver arowana
- Silver dollar
- Six-banded distichodus
- Striped catfish

== Animatronic and replica statue exhibits ==
Extinct Megafuna is represented at the park with a life-sized replica model of the now extinct North Island giant moa, one of the largest flightless-birds to ever exist and was a native to the islands of New Zealand until according to some sources was hunted into non-existence.

Dinosaur Kingdom is an exhibit at the park which includes a number of animatronic models of dinosaurs built to what the species life-sized body size dimensions would have been. The animatronic dinosaurs include replicas of the species: ankylosaurus, dilophosaurus, diplodocus, parasaurolophus, spinosaurus, stegosaurus, triceratops, tyrannosaurus rex and velociraptor.

Mythical Creatures is a similar pair of exhibits in the park which include models of fantasy creatures of myths and legends such as dragons, unicorns, mermaids, sea serpents, a kraken and also aliens.

== Gallery ==
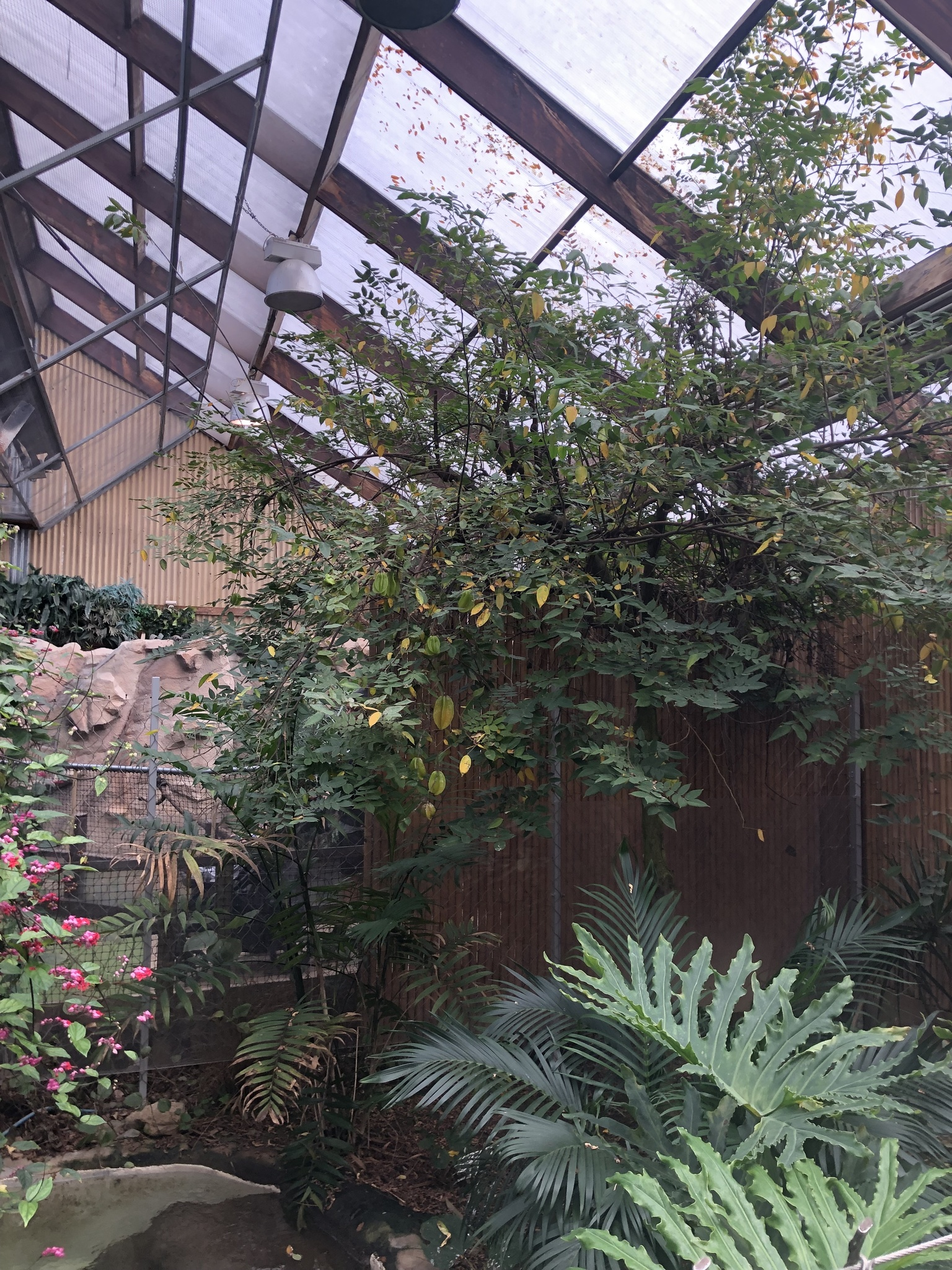
Tropical indoor garden

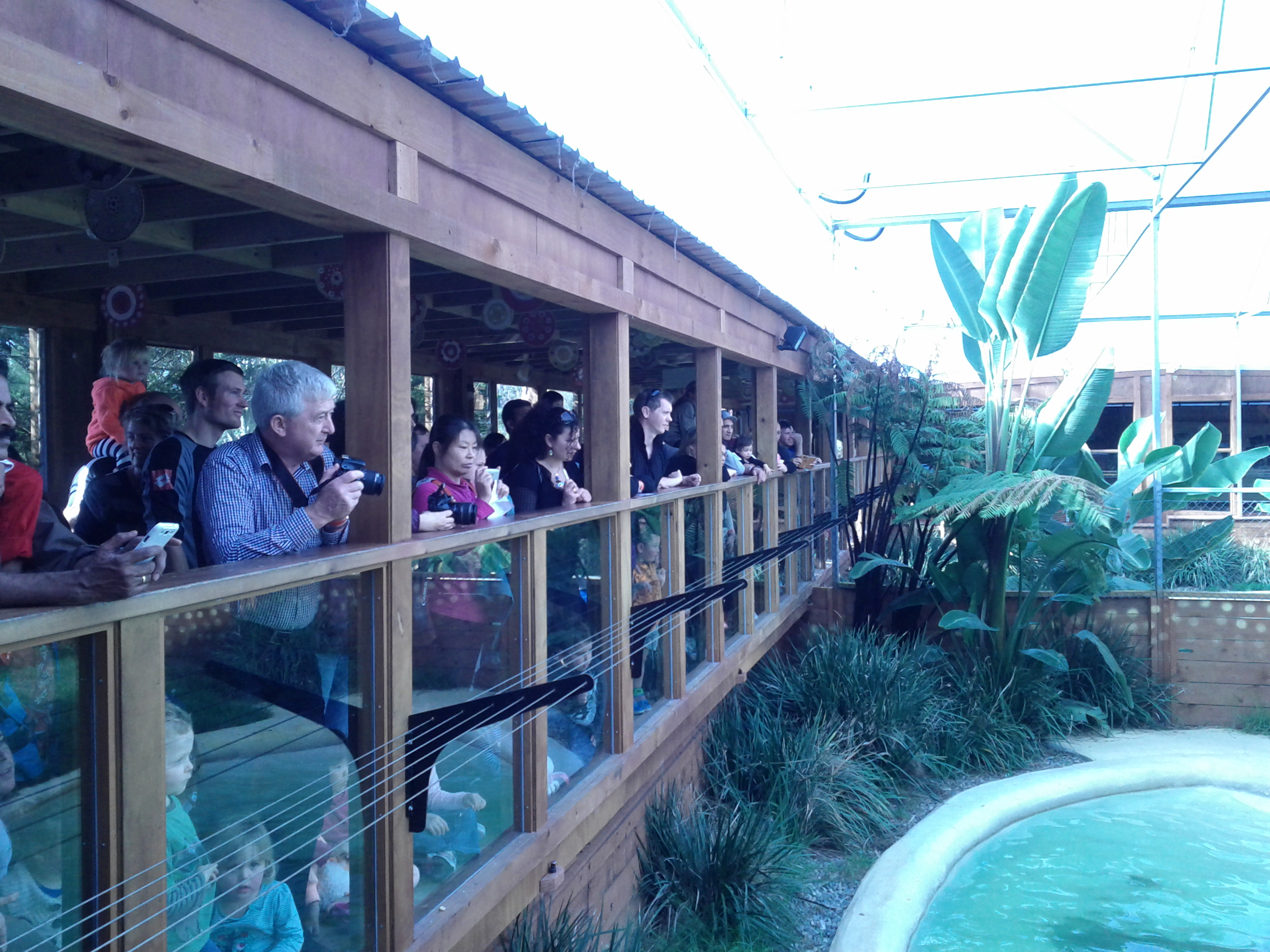
Crocodilian enclosure

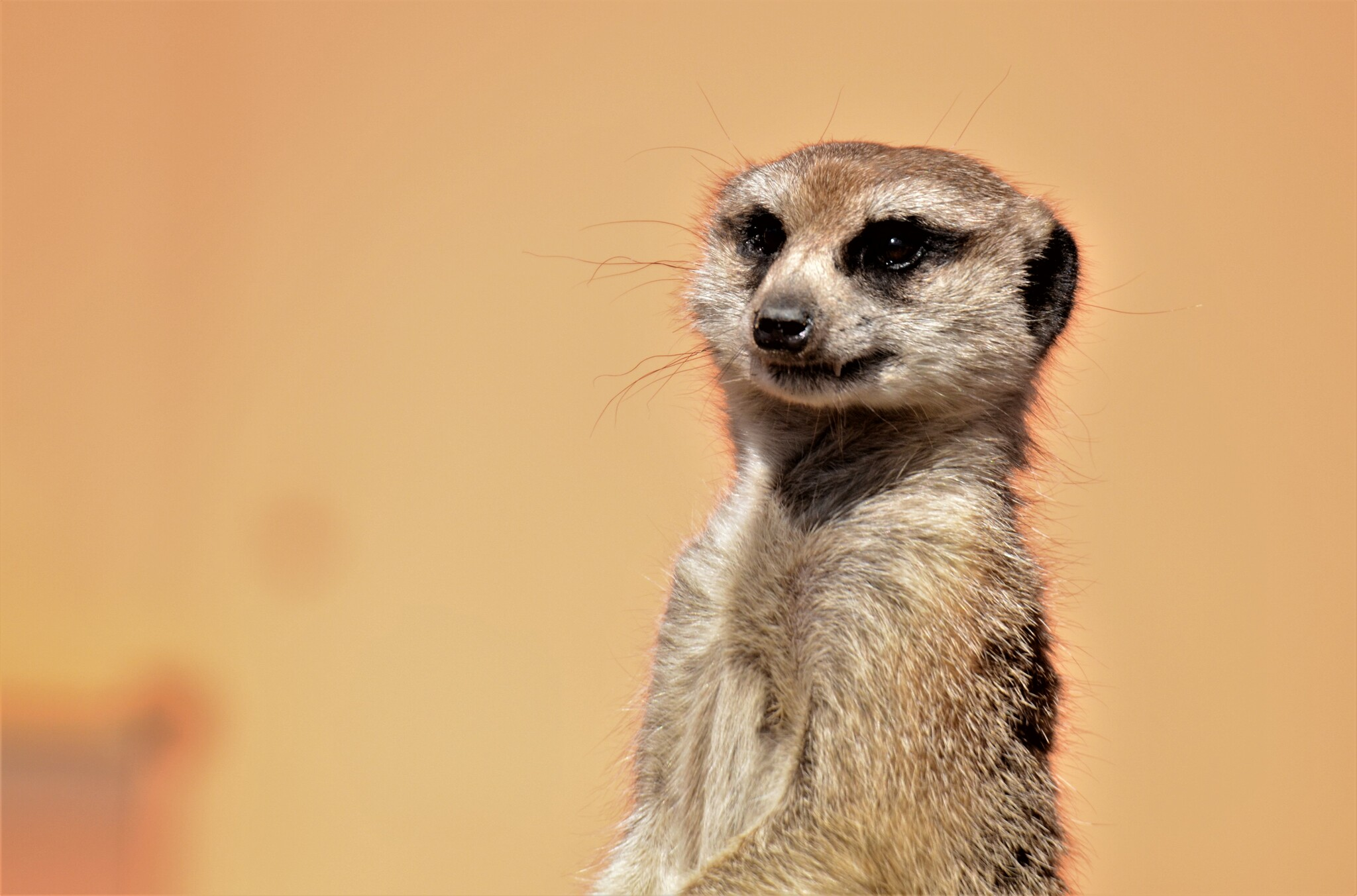
Meerkat at Butterfly Creek

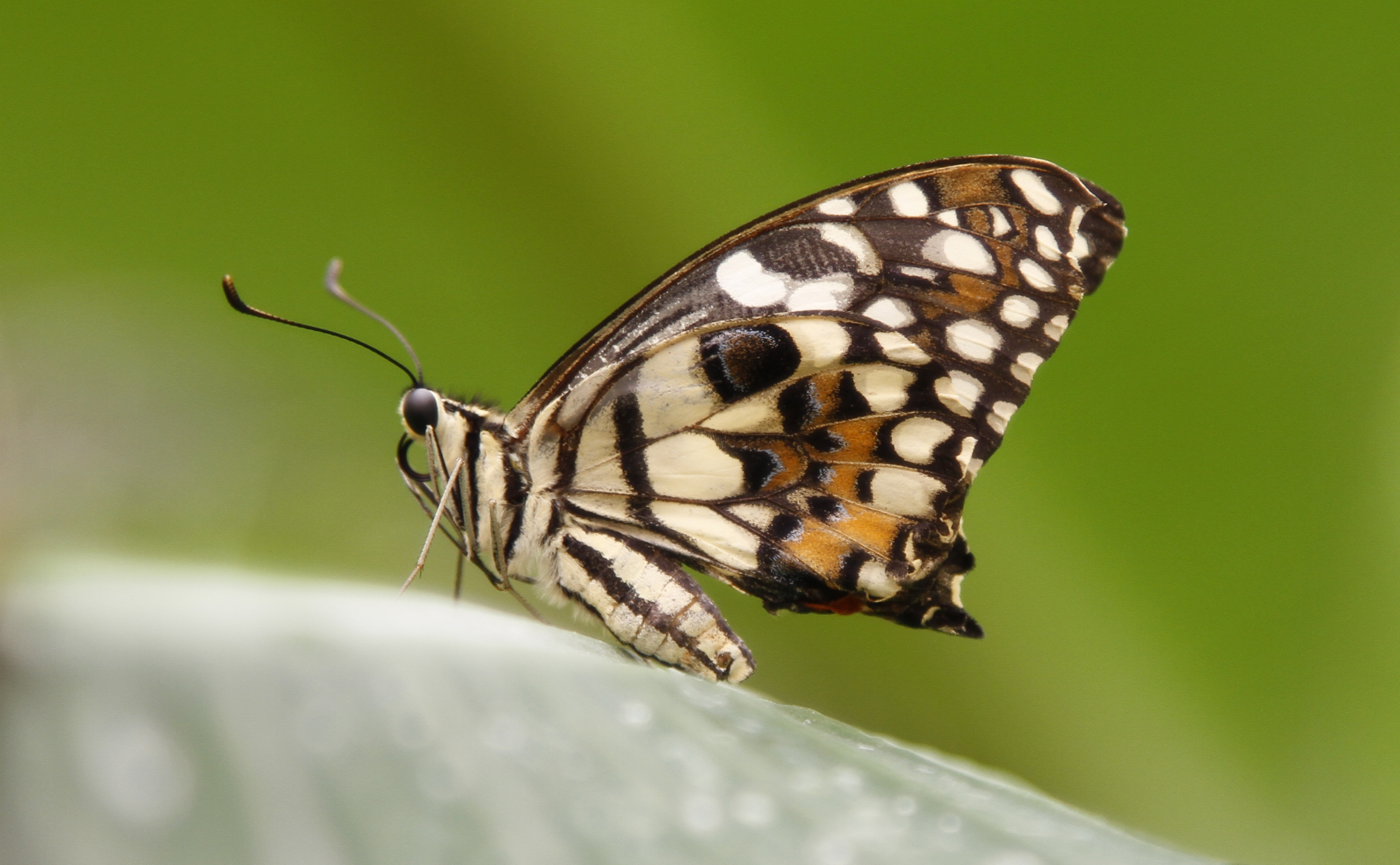
Papilio demoleus

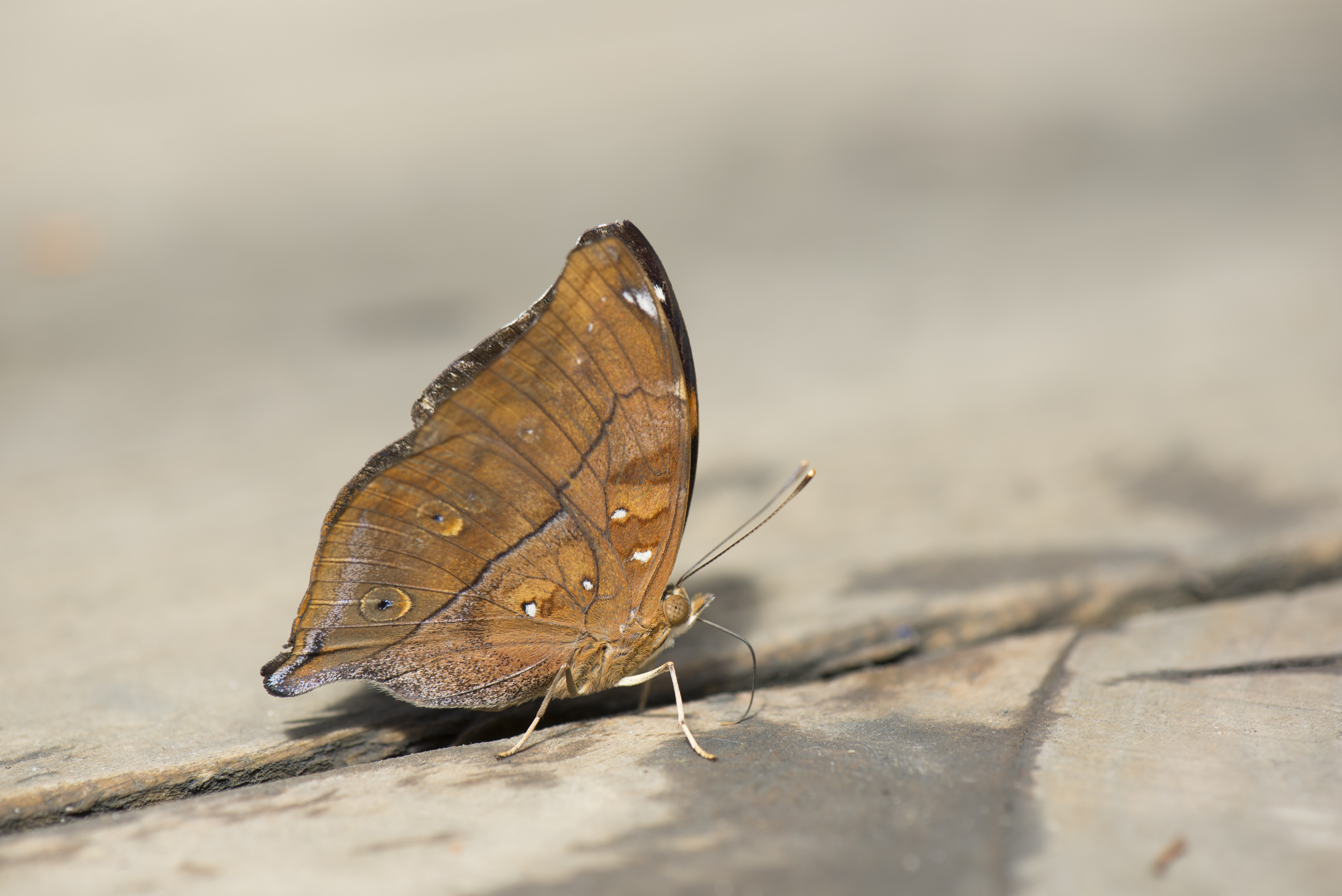
Doleschallia bisaltide

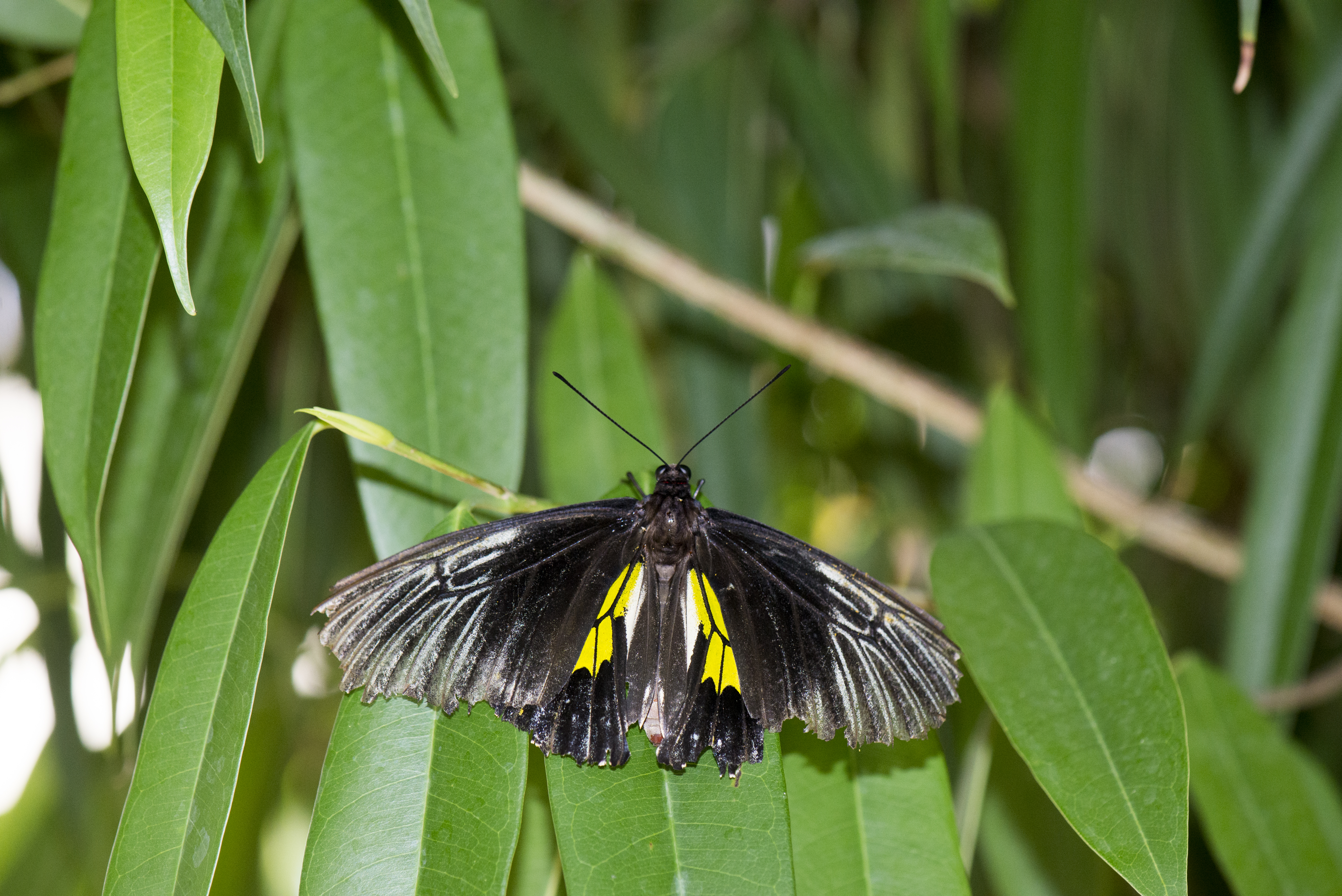
Troides rhadamantus
