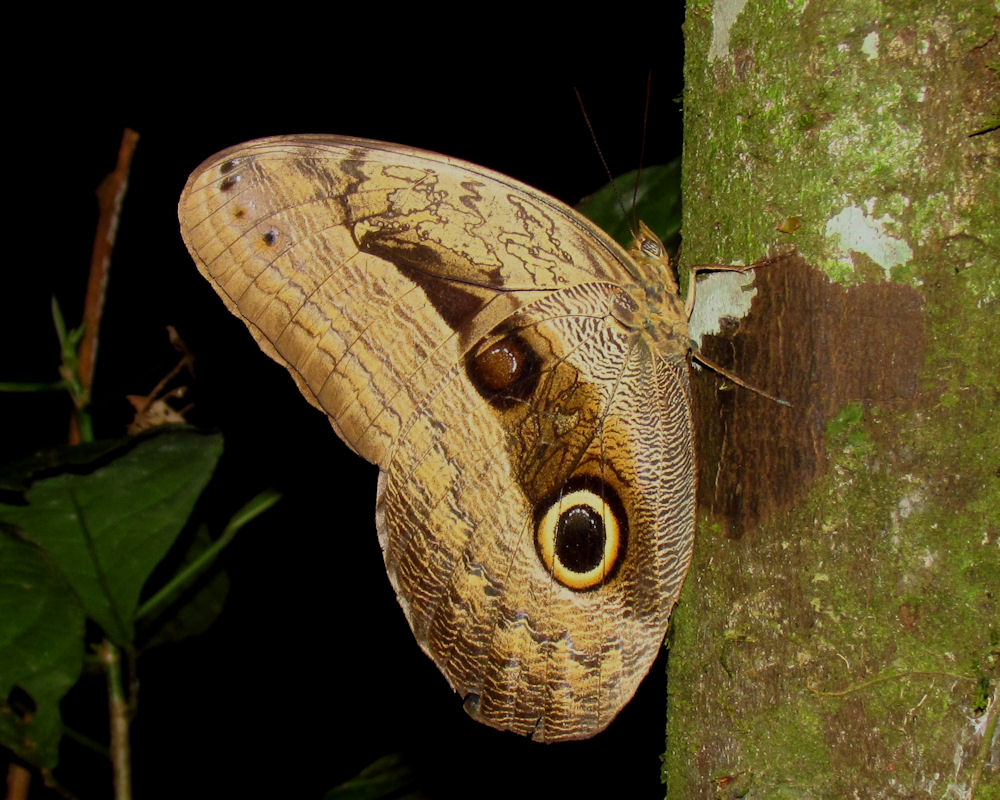

Scientific classification
- Kingdom: Animalia
- Phylum: Arthropoda
- Class: Insecta
- Order: Lepidoptera
- Family: Nymphalidae
- Genus: Caligo
- Species: C. oedipus

Binomial name
- Caligo oedipus Stichel, 1903

Synonyms
- Caligo oedipus ab. nocturnus Stichel, 1903; Caligo oileus hyposchesis Dyar, 1914

= Caligo oedipus =

Boomerang owl

Species of butterfly

Caligo oedipus, the boomerang owl, is a butterfly of the family Nymphalidae. The species can be found from Central America to Colombia.

== Subspecies ==
- C. o. fruhstorferi Stichel, 1904
- C. o. oedipus
