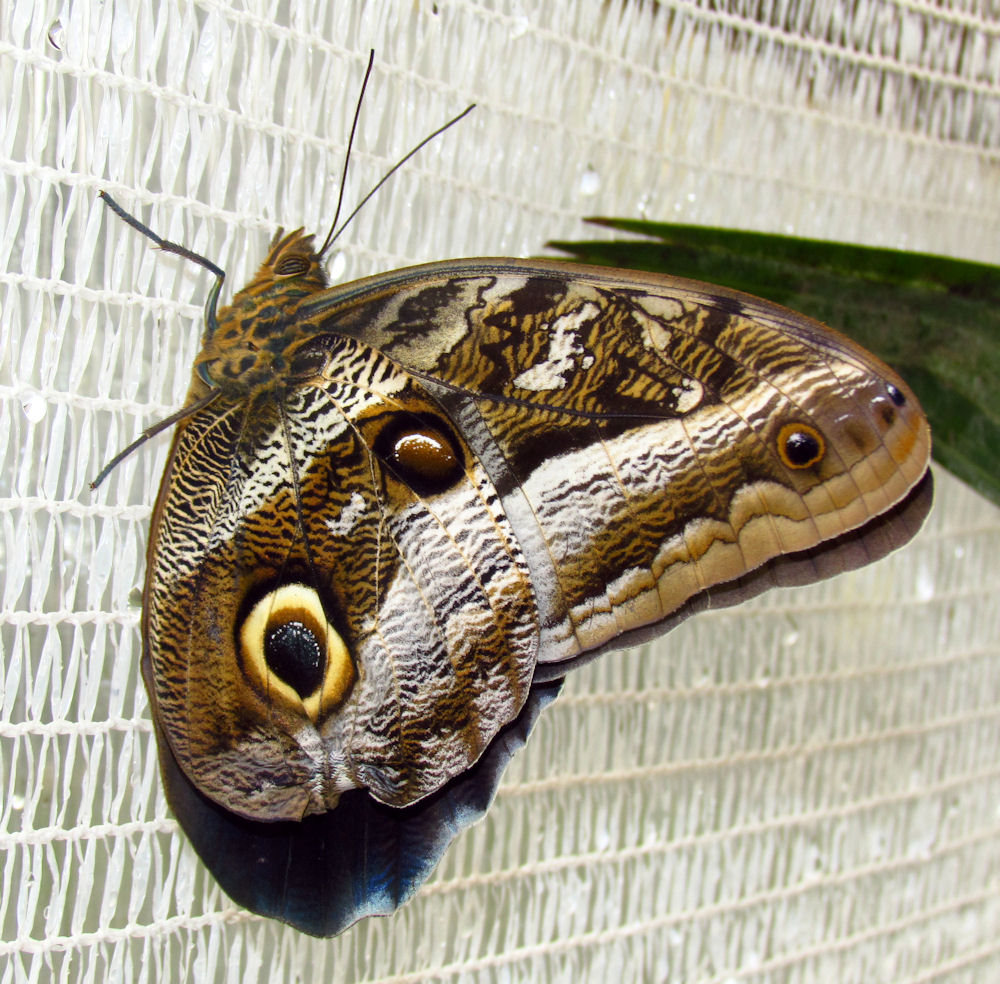
- At Jardín Botánica de Quito, Quito, Ecuador

Scientific classification
- Kingdom: Animalia
- Phylum: Arthropoda
- Class: Insecta
- Order: Lepidoptera
- Family: Nymphalidae
- Genus: Caligo
- Species: C. idomeneus

Binomial name
- Caligo idomeneus (Linnaeus, 1758)

= Caligo idomeneus =

Idomeneus giant owl

Species of butterfly

Caligo idomeneus, the Idomeneus giant owl, is a butterfly of the family Nymphalidae. The species can be found in the Amazon rainforest and eastern Andes, from Venezuela to Ecuador, and south to the Mato Grosso in southern Brazil. The butterfly is named for Idomeneus, the leader of the Cretan army during the Trojan War.

The wingspan is about 110–140 millimetres (4.3–5.5 in).

The larvae feed on Musa species.

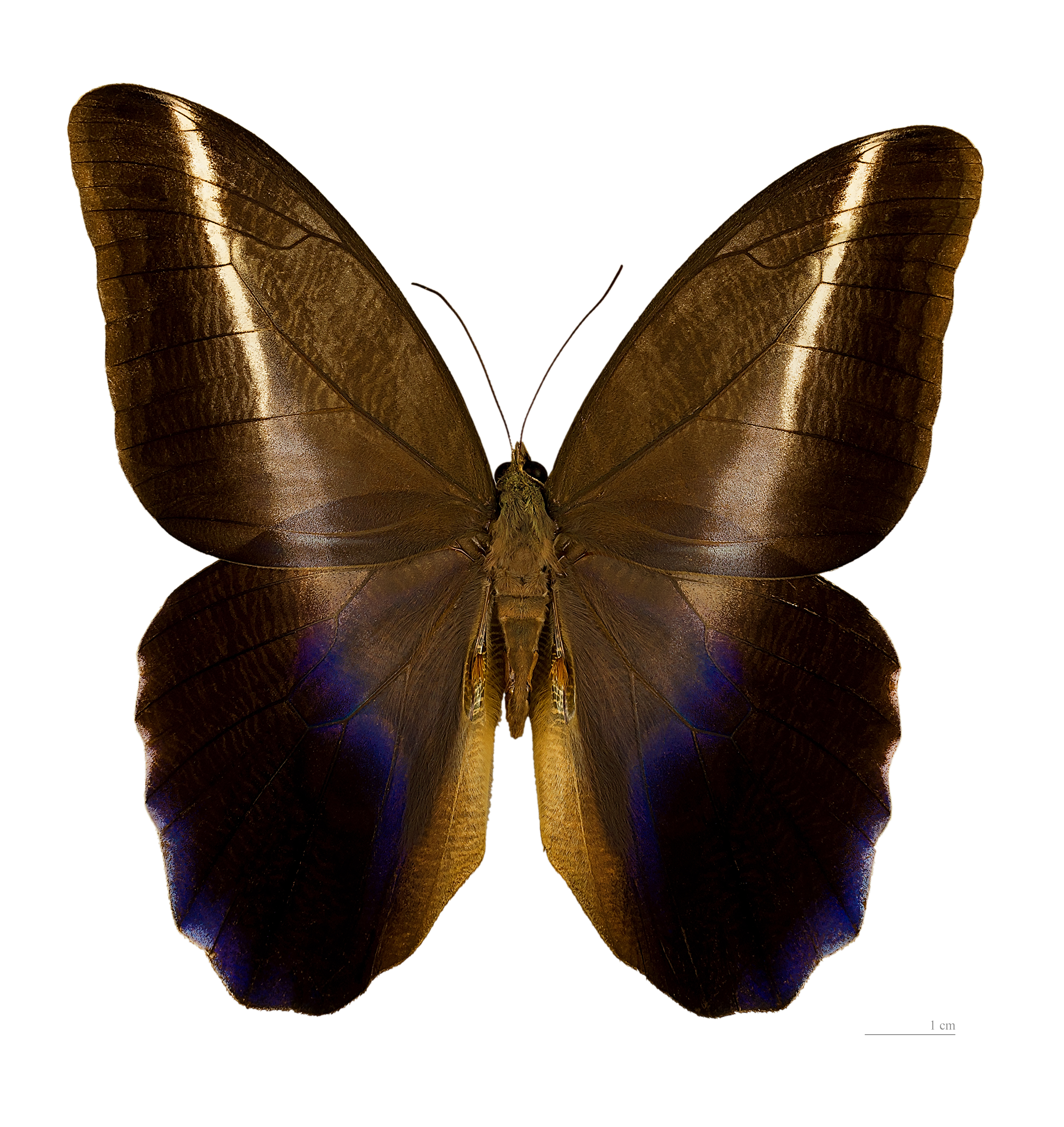
C. i. idomeneus, dorsal, MHNT

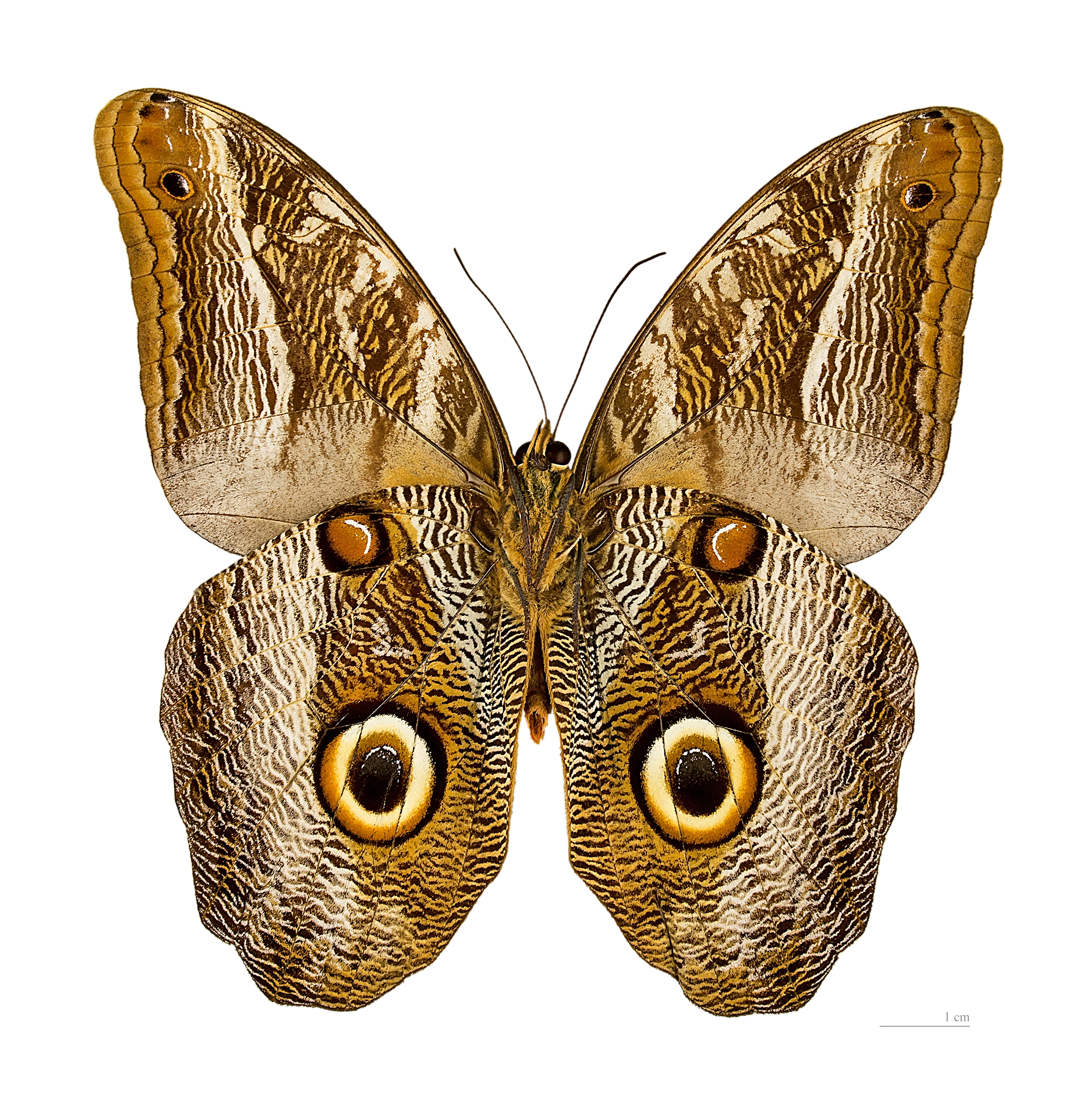
C. i. idomeneus, ventral, MHNT
