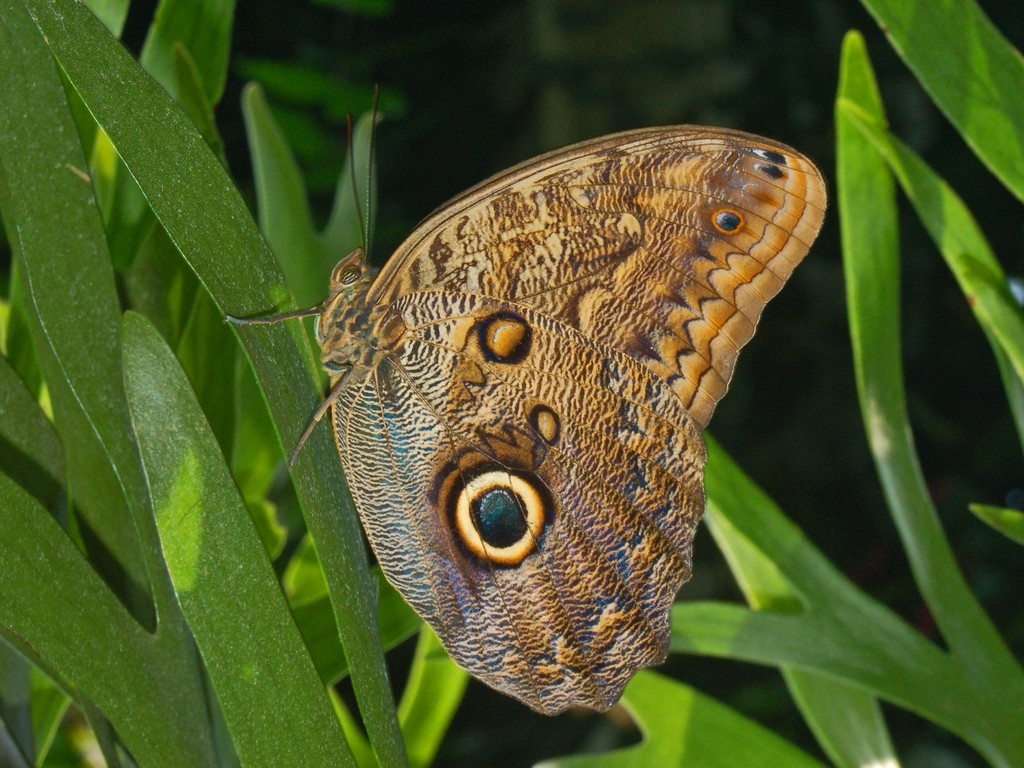

Scientific classification
- Kingdom: Animalia
- Phylum: Arthropoda
- Class: Insecta
- Order: Lepidoptera
- Family: Nymphalidae
- Genus: Caligo
- Species: C. illioneus

Binomial name
- Caligo illioneus (Cramer, 1775)

Synonyms
- Papilio illioneus Cramer, [1775]; Caligo illioneus polyxenus Stichel, 1903; Caligo saltus Kaye, 1904; Caligo oberon Butler, 1870

= Caligo illioneus =

Illioneus giant owl

Species of butterfly

Caligo illioneus, the Illioneus giant owl, is an owl butterfly belonging to the nymphalid family, Morphinae subfamily, tribe Brassolini.

== Etymology ==
The genus Latin name Caligo means "darkness" and may refer to the active periods, as these butterflies preferentially fly in dusk. The specific name illioneus derives from Ilionesus, a Trojan companion of Aeneas in Virgil's Aeneid.

== Description ==
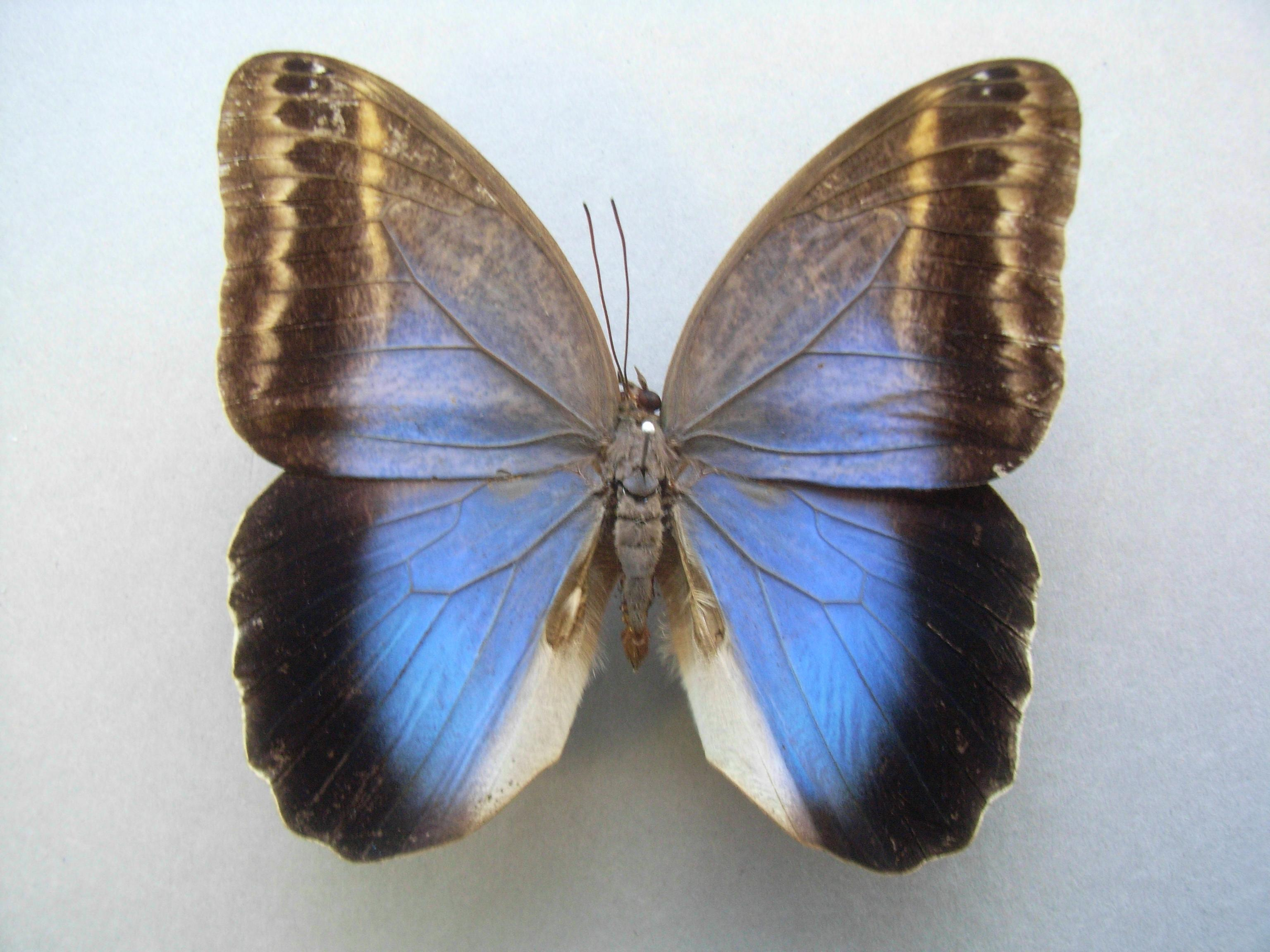
Dorsal view

Caligo illioneus has a wingspan reaching about 12–15 centimetres (4.7–5.9 in). In this large owl butterfly the dorsal sides of the wings vary from light brilliant blue to purplish with dark brown edges, while the undersides have a highly cryptic dull brown color, with huge yellow-rimmed eyespots resembling to the eyes of an owl.

In the early stage the caterpillars are greenish with yellow stripes along the body, about 10 centimetres (3.9 in) long. Later they are light brown with dark brown longitudinal stripes, about 12 centimetres (4.7 in) long. The caterpillars grow on banana plants, causing the destruction of large areas of banana plantations, while the adults mainly feed on the juices of fermenting fruits.

== Distribution ==
The species is native to Costa Rica and it is widespread in most of South America, particularly in Brazil, Colombia, Ecuador, Guyana, Peru, and Venezuela.

== Habitat ==
This owl butterfly lives in South American rainforests and secondary forests.

== Subspecies ==
- Caligo illioneus illioneus (Suriname, Venezuela, Trinidad)
- Caligo illioneus oberon Butler, 1870 (Costa Rica, Panama, Ecuador, Venezuela, Colombia)
- Caligo illioneus pampeiro Fruhstorfer, 1904 (Paraguay)
- Caligo illioneus pheidriades Fruhstorfer, 1912 (Bolivia)
- Caligo illioneus praxsiodus Fruhstorfer, 1912 (Peru)
