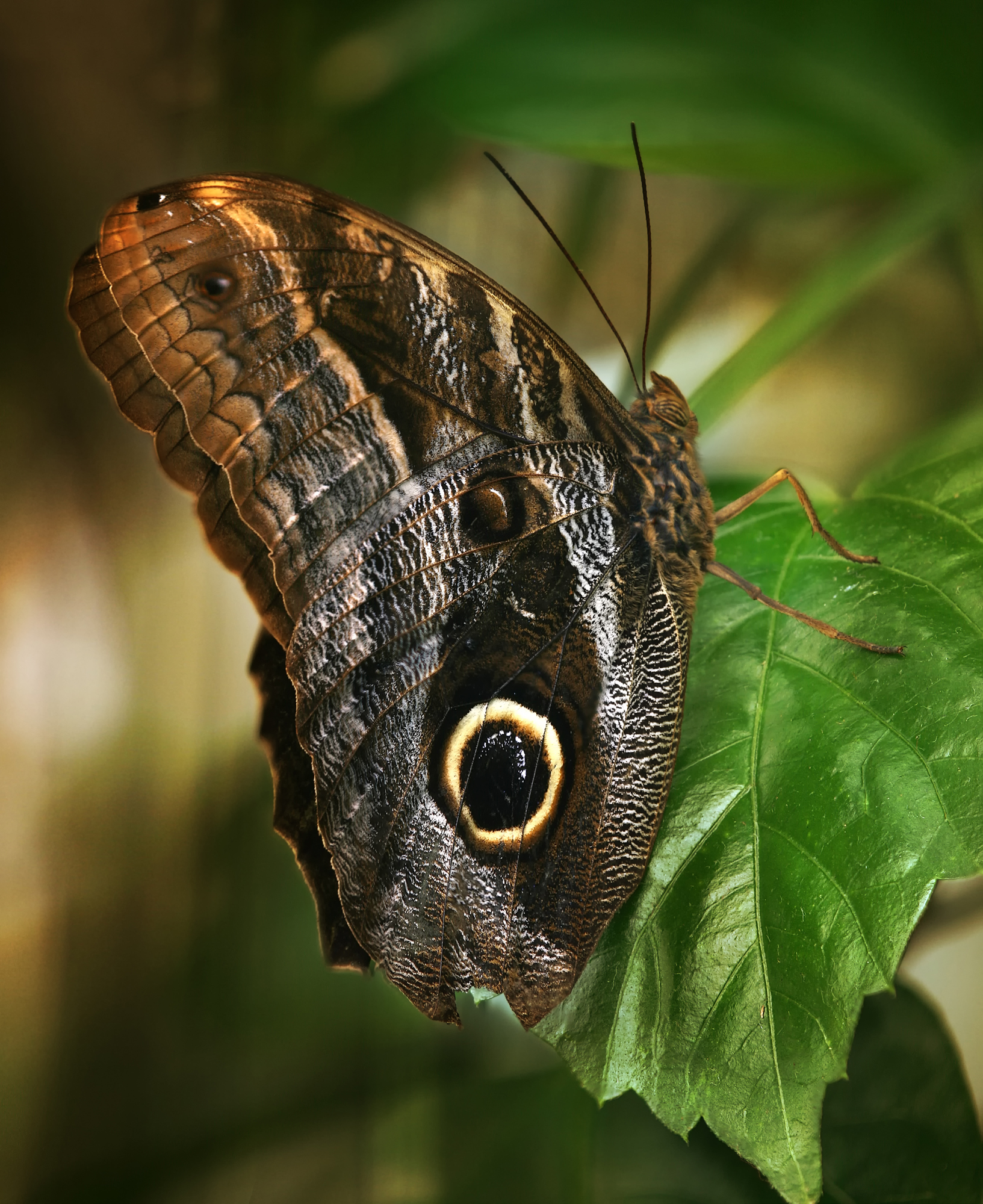

Scientific classification
- Kingdom: Animalia
- Phylum: Arthropoda
- Class: Insecta
- Order: Lepidoptera
- Family: Nymphalidae
- Genus: Caligo
- Species: C. eurilochus

Binomial name
- Caligo eurilochus (Cramer, [1775])

= Caligo eurilochus =

Forest giant owl

Species of butterfly in the family Nymphalidae

Caligo eurilochus, the forest giant owl, is an owl butterfly (tribe Brassolini of nymphalid subfamily Morphinae) ranging from Mexico, through Central America, to the Amazon River basin in South America. It is a very large butterfly, among the largest in its family, with a wingspan up to 17 centimetres. The type locality is Suriname.

Several subspecies are recognized, but many more have been proposed.

The larvae feed on several host plants, including Calathea latifolia (Marantaceae), Heychium sp. (Zingiberaceae), Heliconia latispatha (Heliconiaceae), and Musa spp. (Musaceae). The larva also feed on the fruit of most Musa species. The female lays a large number of eggs of one of the host plants and the small larvae hatch after about 3 to 5 days. Fertile eggs develop a grey ring just above the center. Infertile eggs collapse. The first instar of the larvae are white with two orange/brown stripes down the length of their body leading to two little spindles at the end. Later on in life the larvae develop hairs mimicking spines and a crown made of four horns at the back of their head. The larvae then find a high enough spot to pupate and begin the change of metamorphosis. The large owl butterfly emerges and begins to pump out its wings, later searching for food. the butterflies drink the juices of fermenting fruits and a wide variety of nectar plants.

== Gallery ==
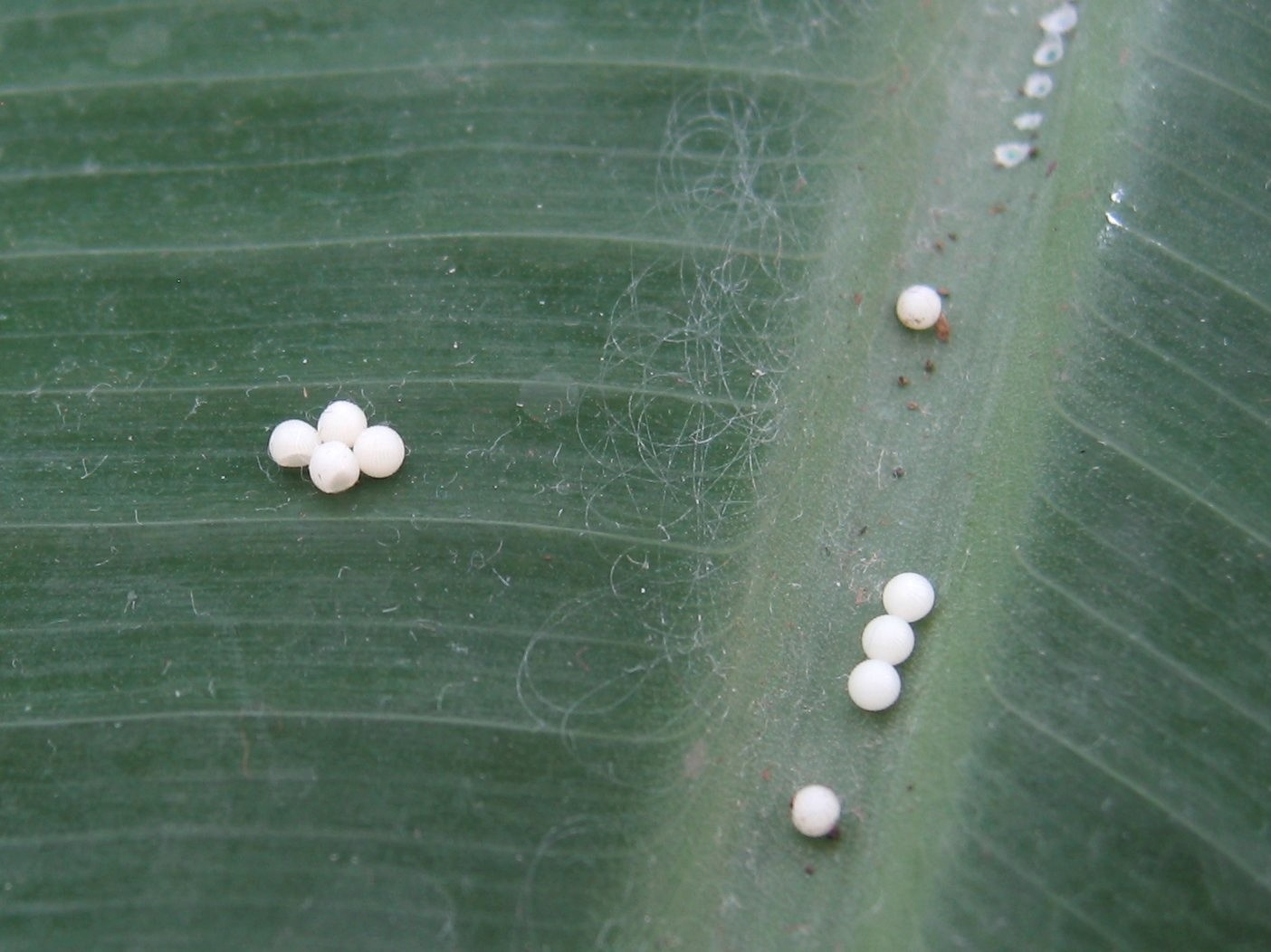
Eggs

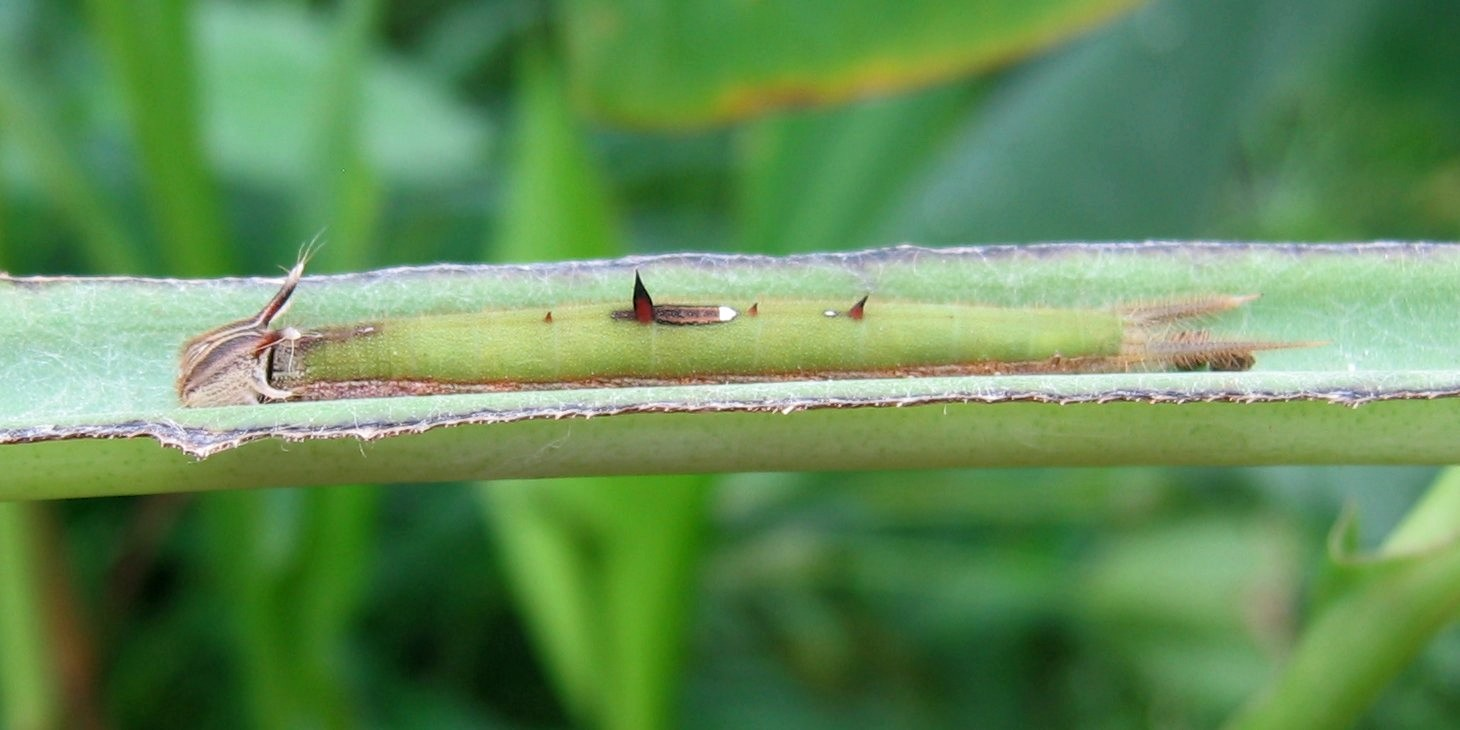
Caterpillar

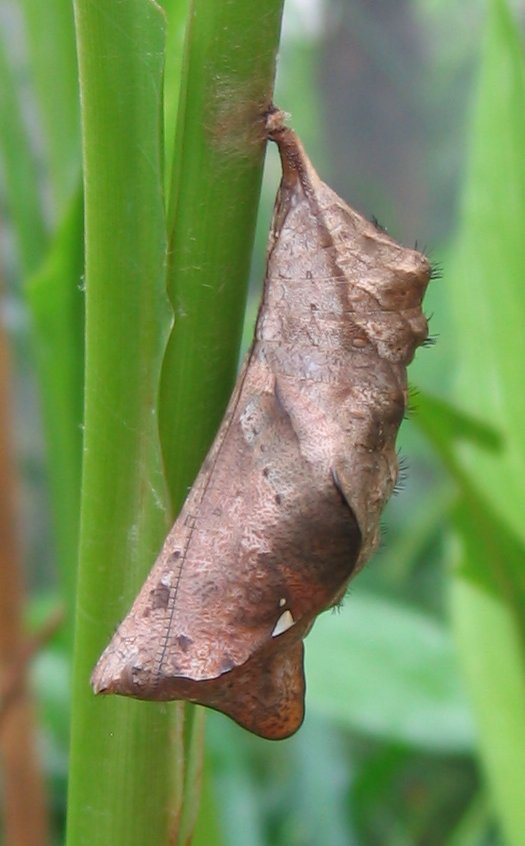
Pupa

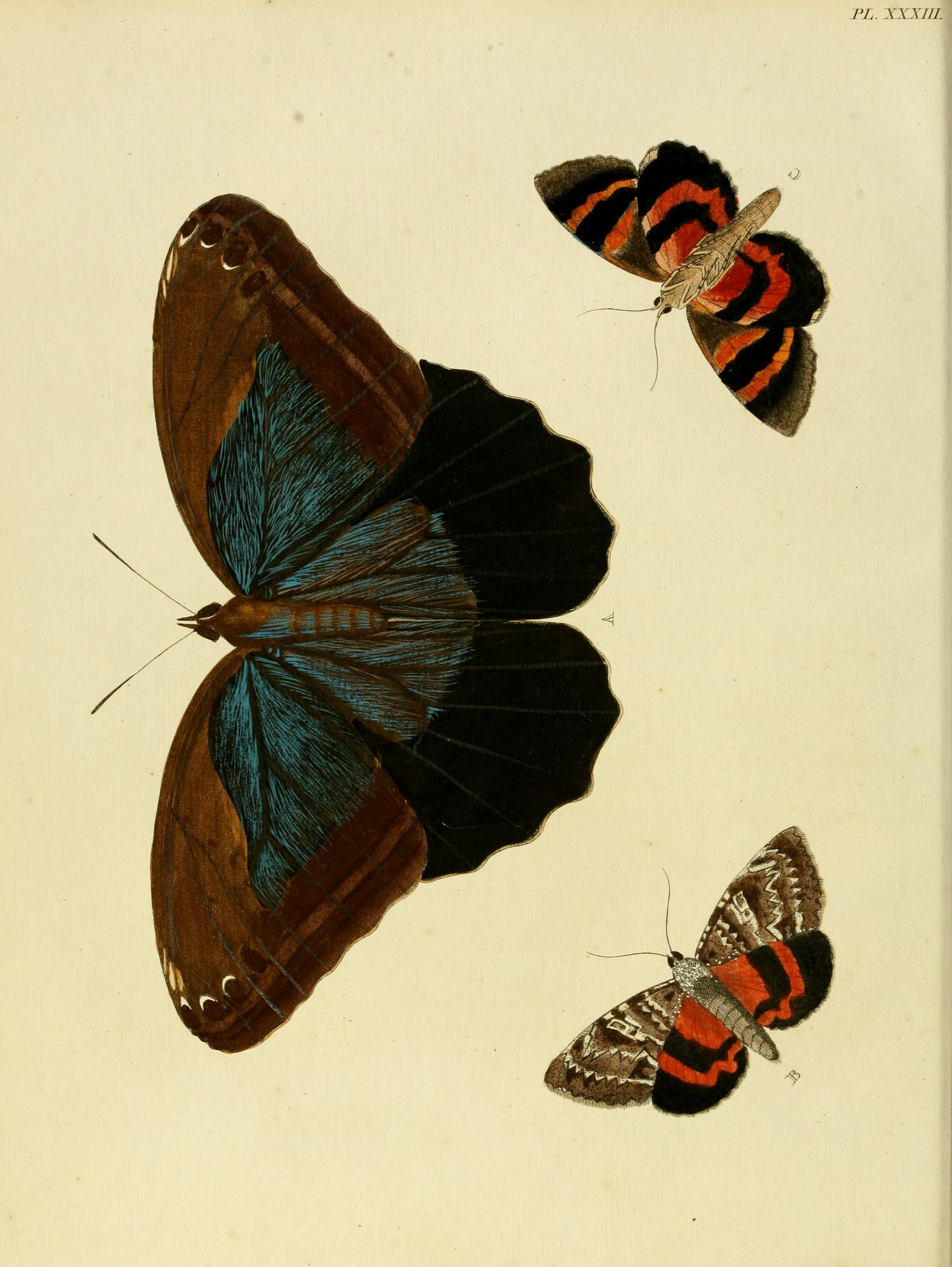
Plate from De Uitlandsche Kapellen illustrating the iconotype of C. eurilochus

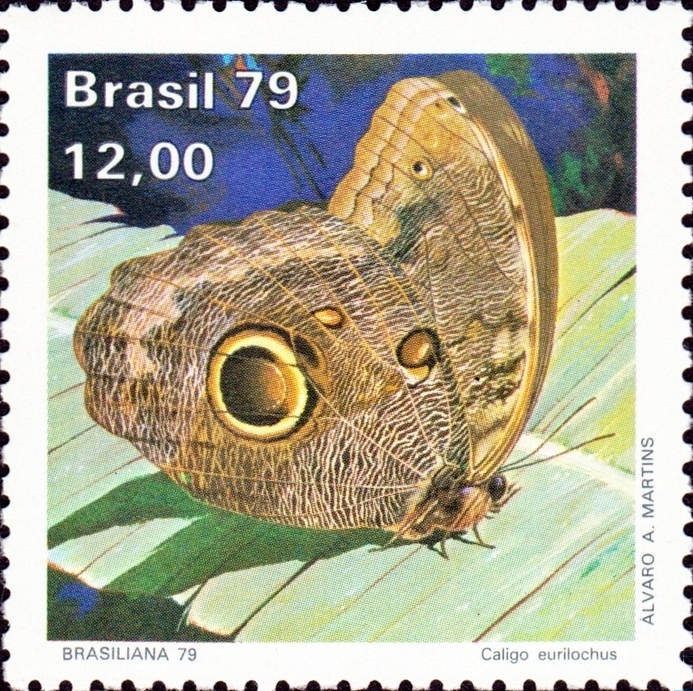
Ventral
