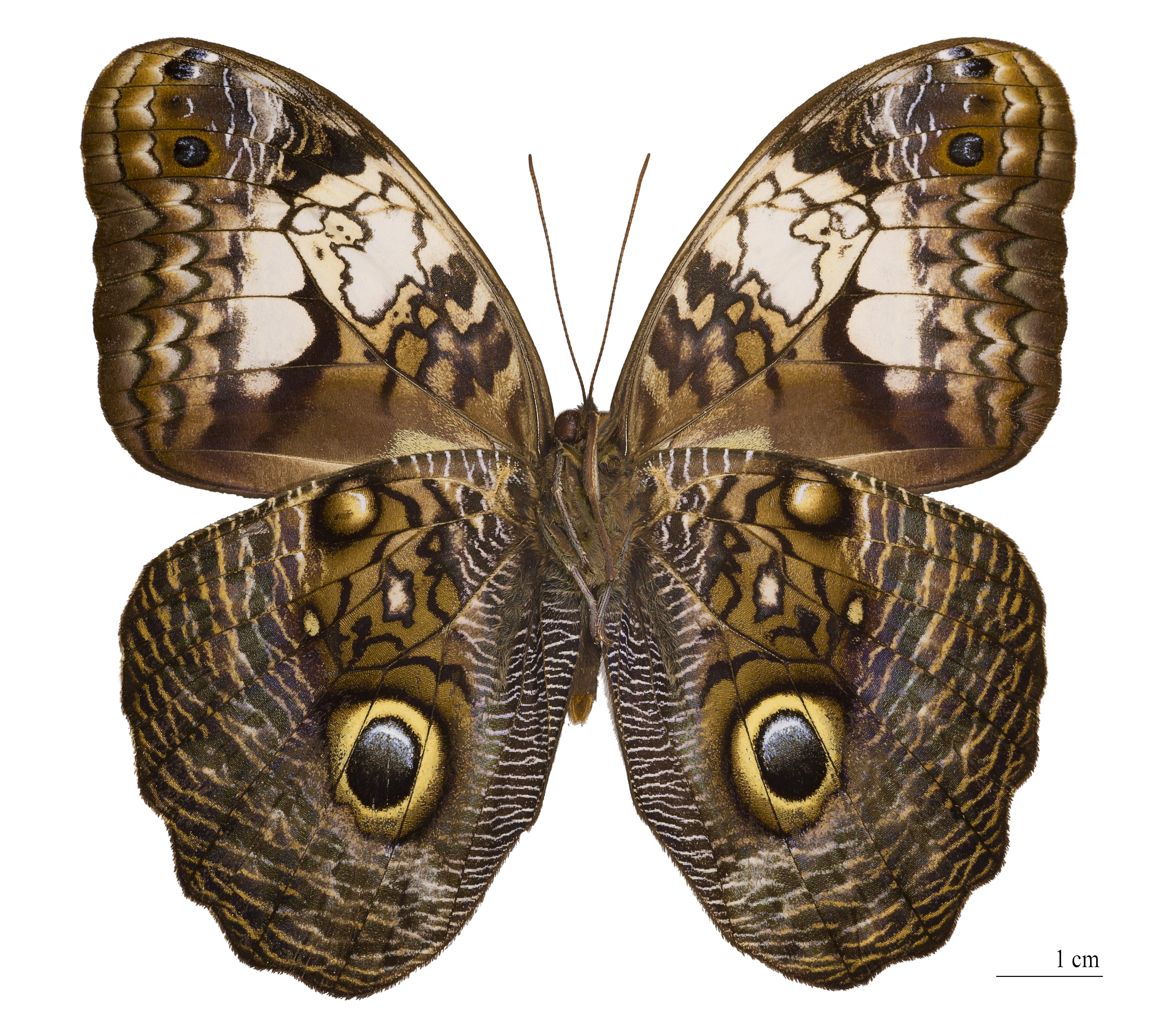
- Caligo martia, underside

Scientific classification
- Kingdom: Animalia
- Phylum: Arthropoda
- Clade: Pancrustacea
- Class: Insecta
- Order: Lepidoptera
- Family: Nymphalidae
- Tribe: Brassolini
- Genus: Caligo; Hübner, [1819]

Type species
- Caligo eurilochus Cramer, 1775

Diversity
- Some 20 species

Synonyms
- Hamadryas Mikan, 1821 (non Hübner, 1804: preoccupied); Aerodes Billberg, 1820; Pavonia Godart, [1824]

= Owl butterfly =

Owl butterflies

Members of brush-footed butterfly genus Caligo

The owl butterflies are species of the genus Caligo and are known for their large eyespots, which resemble owls' eyes. They are found in the rainforests and secondary forests of Mexico, Central and South America.

Owl butterflies are very large, 65–200 mm (2.6–7.9 in), and fly only a few meters at a time, so avian predators have little difficulty in following them to their settling place. However, the butterflies preferentially fly in dusk, when few avian predators are around. The Latin name may possibly refer to their active periods; caligo means darkness.

Some owl butterflies form leks in mating behavior.

== Species ==
Listed alphabetically within groups:

There are some twenty species in this genus, which can be divided into six groups that might constitute subgenera. Some species are of uncertain placement with regard to these groups, however:

- C. eurilochus species group
  - Caligo bellerophon Stichel, 1903
  - Caligo brasiliensis (C. Felder, 1862) – Brazilian owl, almond-eyed owl
  - Caligo eurilochus (Cramer, [1775]) – forest giant owl
  - Caligo idomeneus (Linnaeus, 1758) – Idomeneus giant owl
  - Caligo illioneus (Cramer, [1775]) – Illioneus giant owl
  - Caligo memnon (C. & R. Felder, [1867]) – giant owl, pale owl
  - Caligo prometheus (Kollar, 1850)
  - Caligo suzanna (Deyrolle, 1872)
  - Caligo telamonius (C. & R. Felder, 1862) – yellow-fronted owl
  - Caligo teucer (Linnaeus, 1758) – Teucer giant owl
- C. arisbe species group:
  - Caligo arisbe Hübner, [1822]
  - Caligo martia (Godart, [1824])
  - Caligo oberthurii (Deyrolle, 1872)
- C. atreus species group:
  - Caligo atreus (Kollar, 1850) – yellow-edged giant owl
  - Caligo uranus Herrich-Schäffer, 1850 – yellow-bordered owl
- C. oileus species group
  - Caligo oedipus Stichel, 1903 – boomerang owl
  - Caligo oileus C. & R. Felder, 1861 – Oileus giant owl
  - Caligo placidianus Staudinger, 1887 – placid giant owl
  - Caligo zeuxippus Druce, 1902
- C. beltrao species group
  - Caligo beltrao (Illiger, 1801) – purple owl
- incertae sedis
  - Caligo euphorbus (C. & R. Felder, 1862) – Euphorbus giant owl
  - Caligo superbus Staudinger, 1887
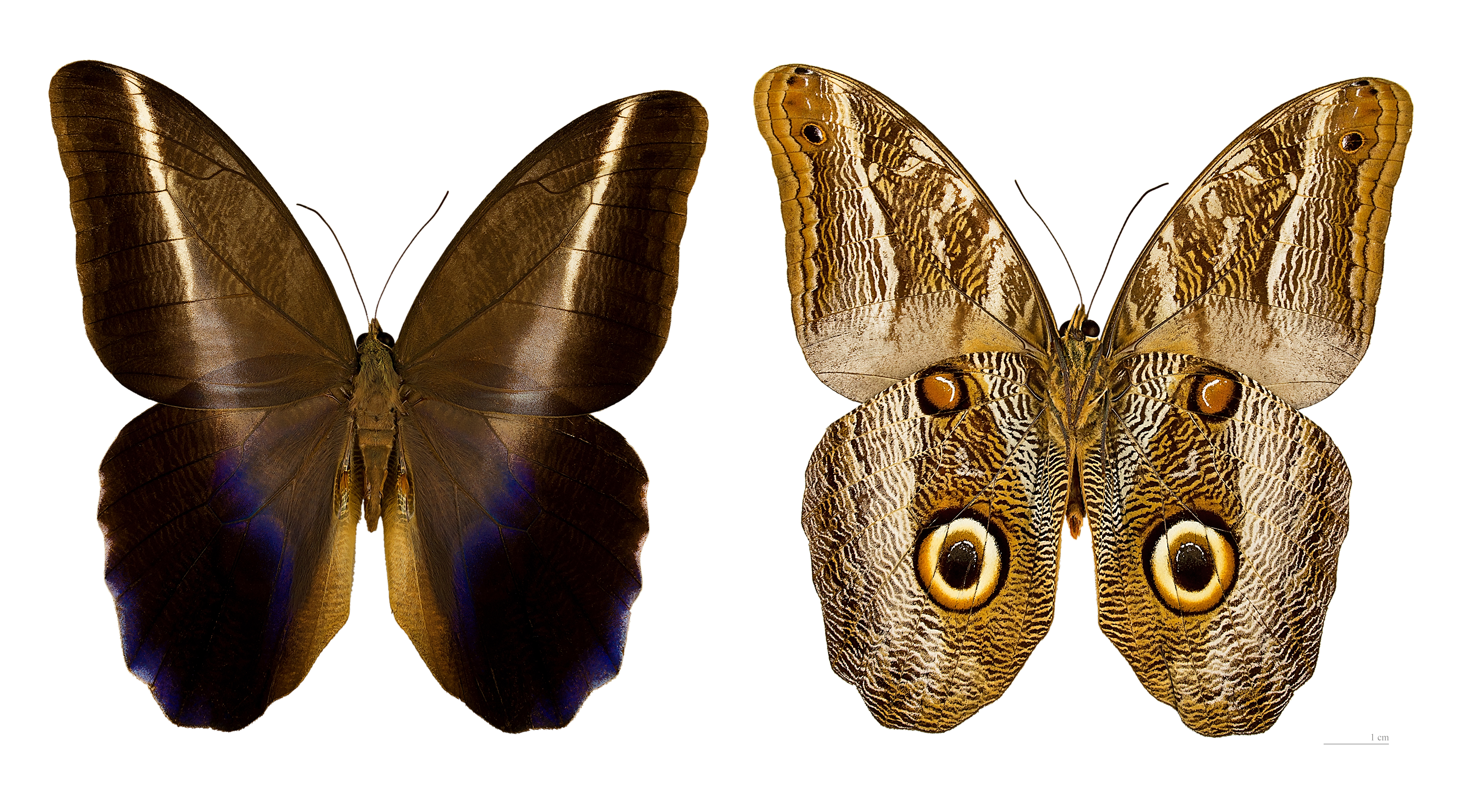
Caligo idomeneus - MHNT

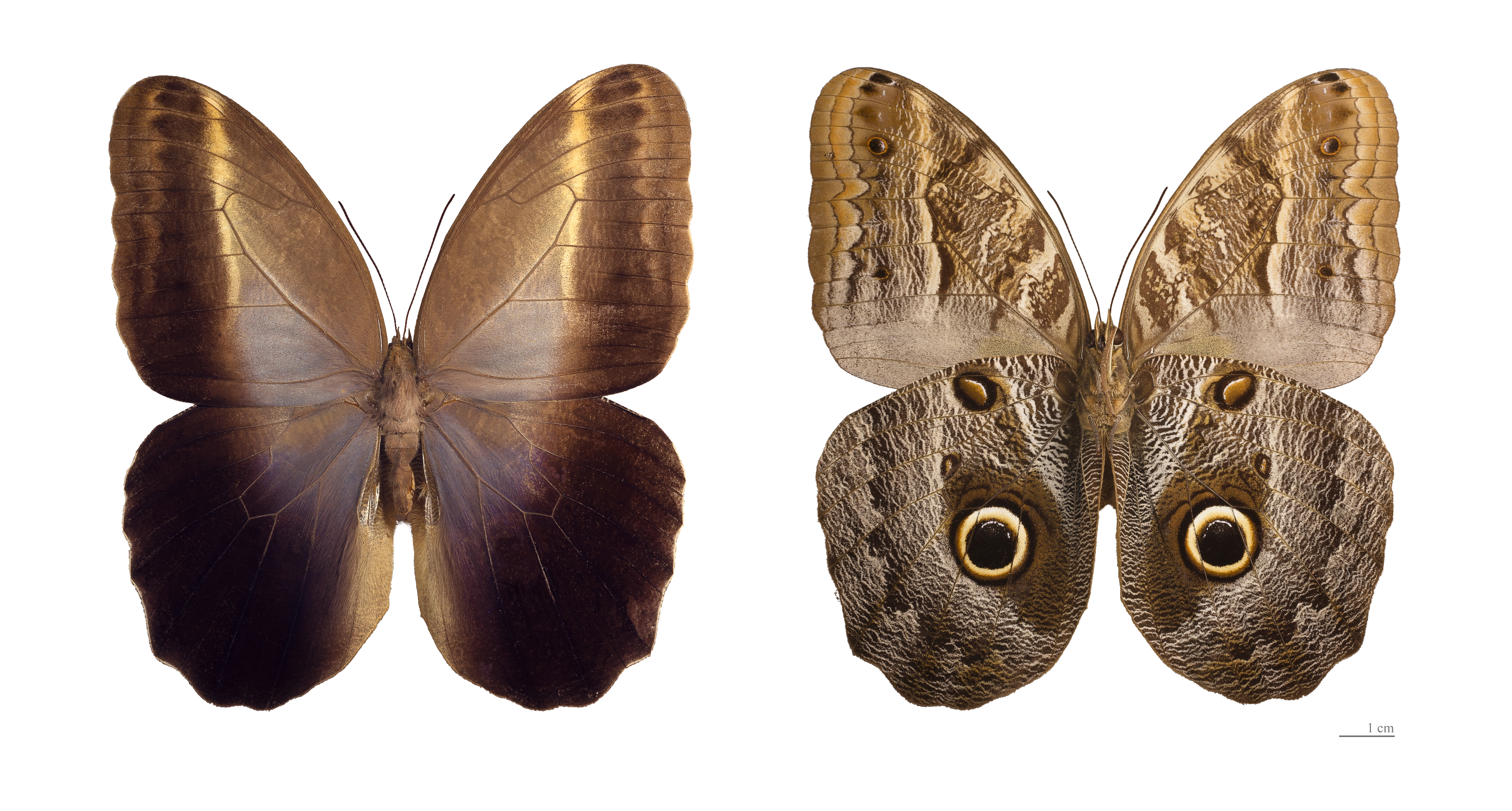
Caligo teucer - MHNT

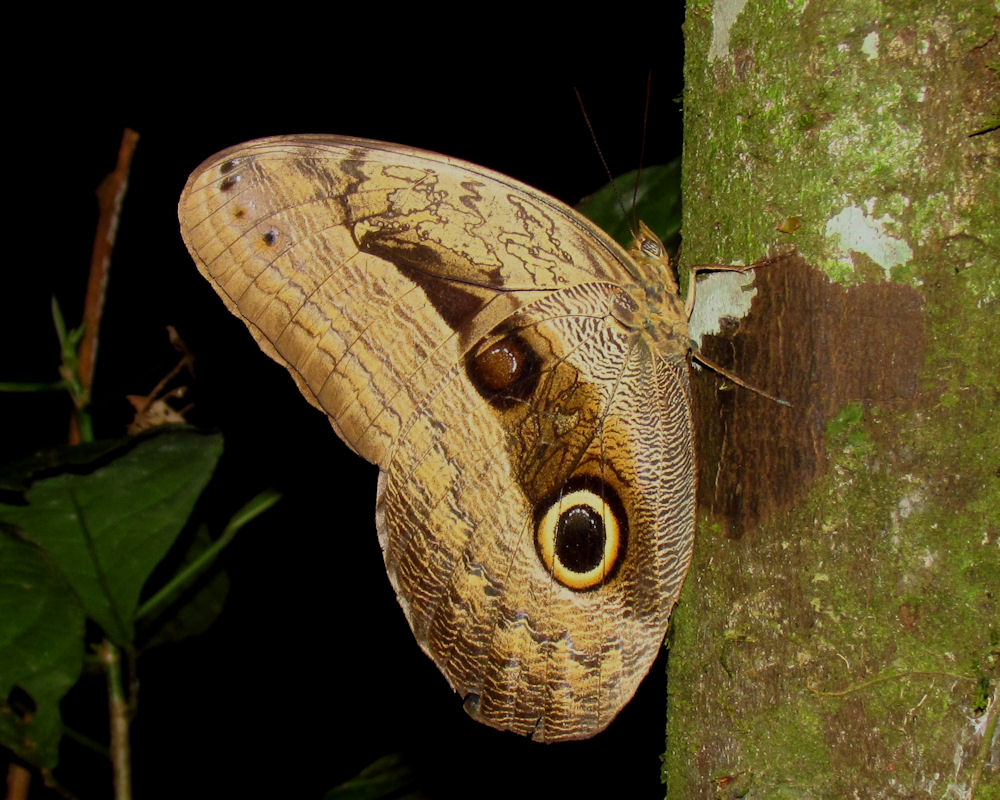
Caligo oedipus

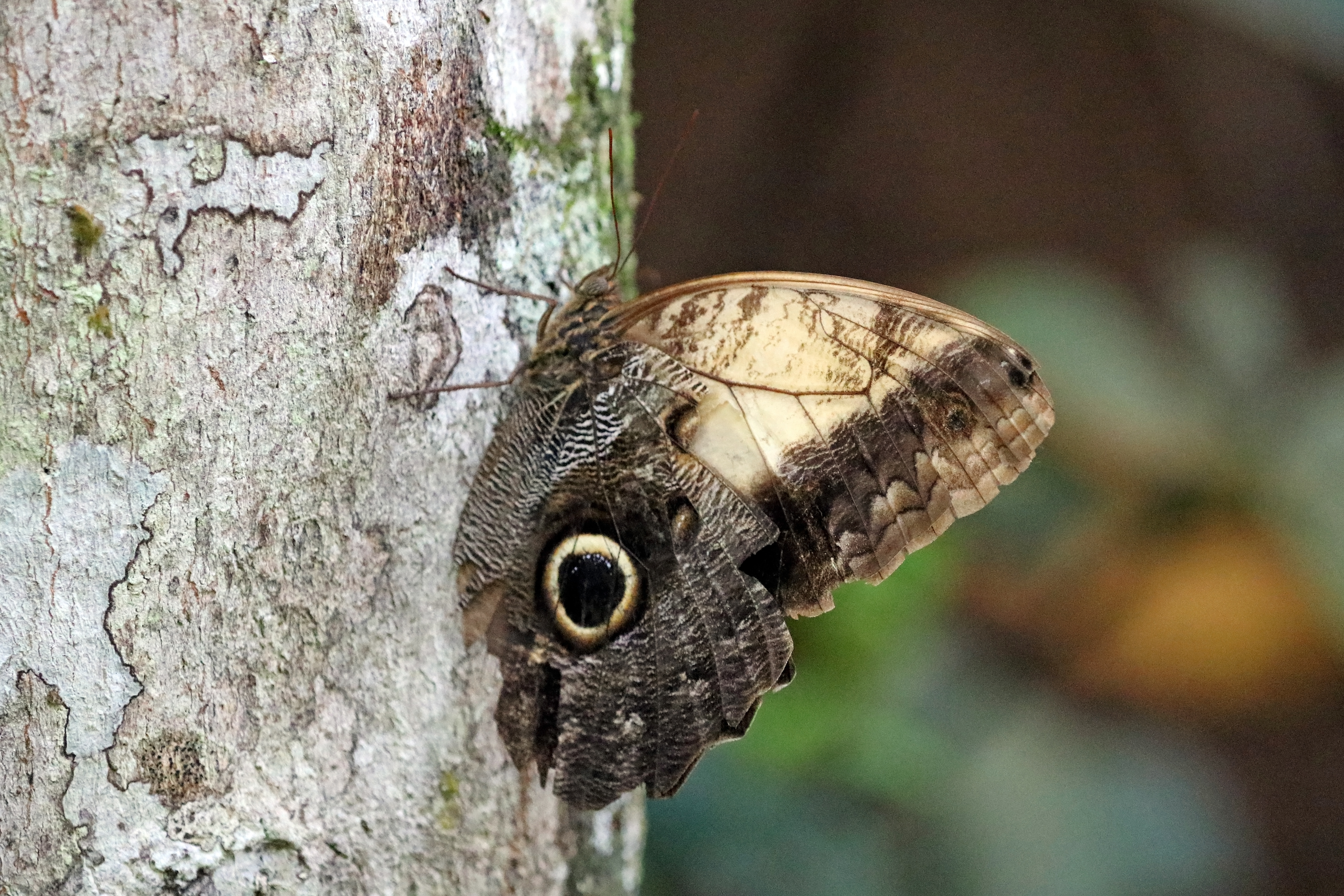
Caligo telamonius
in Costa Rica

== Functions of the wing pattern ==
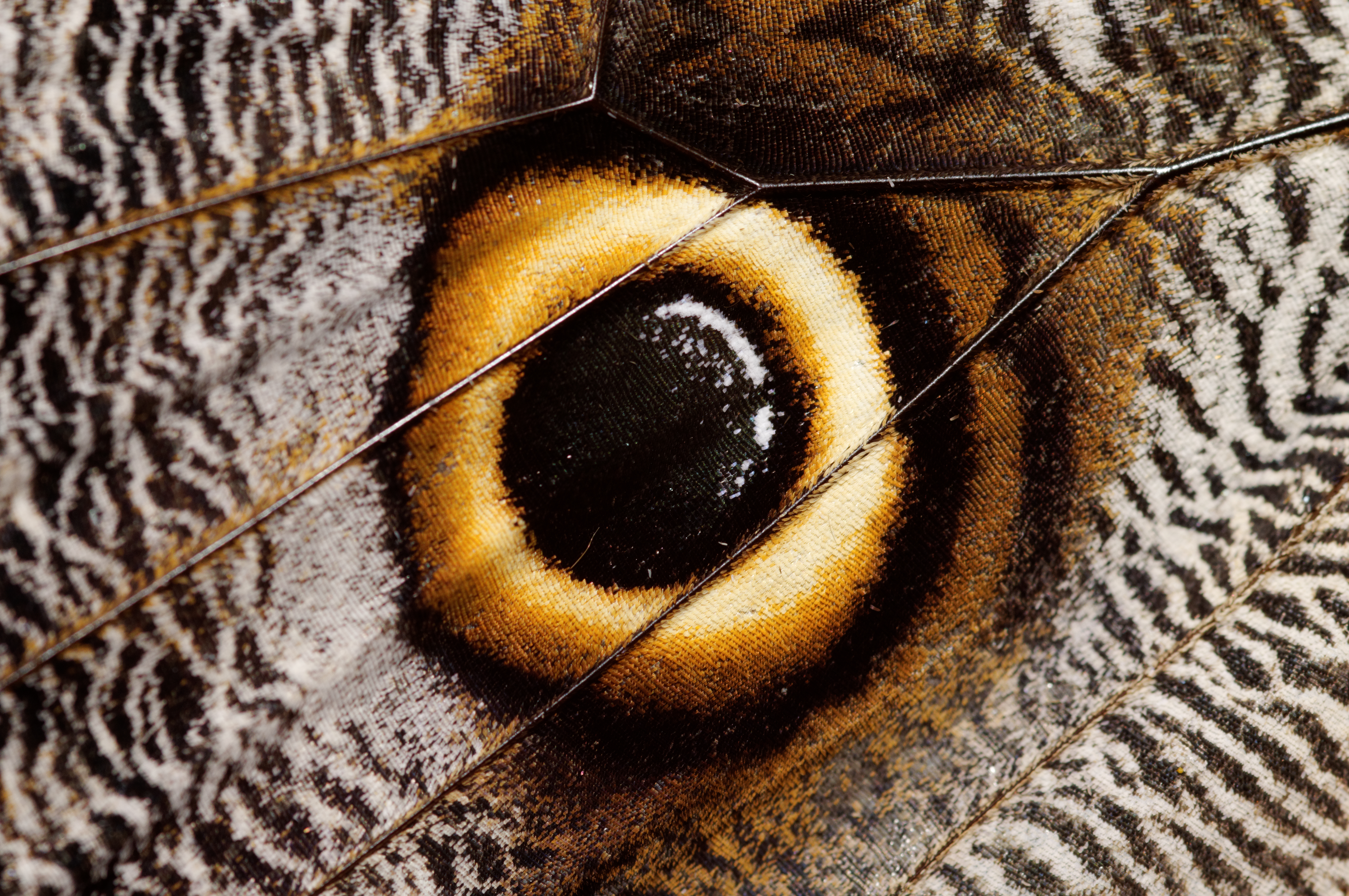
Close-up of a Caligo wing

The underwing pattern is highly cryptic. It is conceivable that the eye pattern is a generalized form of mimicry. It is known that many small animals hesitate to go near patterns resembling eyes with a light-colored iris and a large pupil, which matches the appearance of the eyes of many predators that hunt by sight.

According to the Batesian mimicry theory the pattern on the wings of Caligo resemble the head of a predator like a lizard or an amphibian. It should deter predators while resting, feeding, mating, or emerging from the pupa.

The role of eyespots as antipredator mechanisms has been discussed since the 19th century. Several hypotheses are suggested to explain their occurrence. In some butterflies, particularly Satyrinae (such as the gatekeeper butterfly and the grayling), it has been shown that ocelli (eyespots) serve as a decoy, diverting bird attack away from the vulnerable body, and towards the outer part of the hindwings or the forewing tip.

Research by Martin Stevens et al. (2008), however, suggests that eyespots are not a form of mimicry and do not deter predators because they look like eyes. Rather the conspicuous contrast in the patterns on the wings deter predators. In this study, however, the influence of surrounding forms, like the head region of a predator, was not tested. Also the question why animals evolved such complex imitations of other species is left unanswered.
