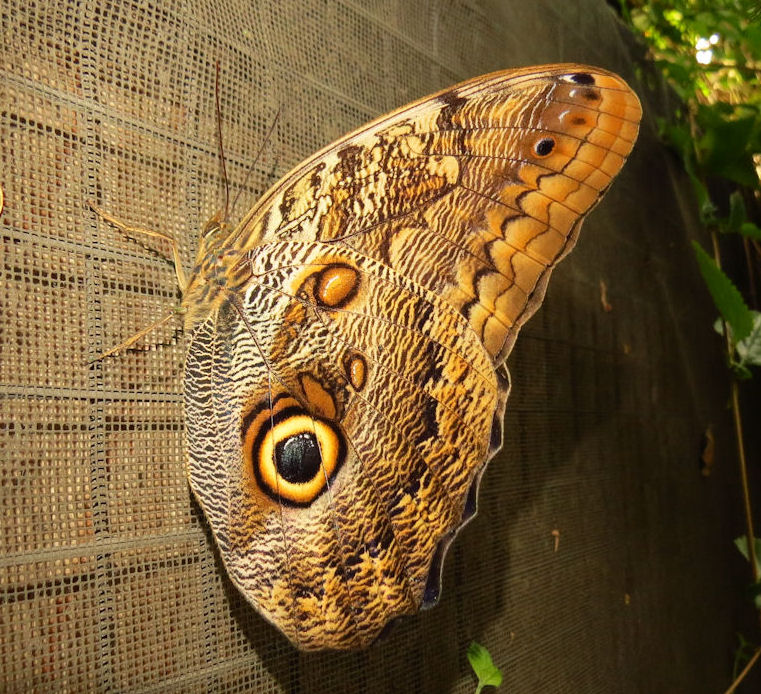

Scientific classification
- Kingdom: Animalia
- Phylum: Arthropoda
- Class: Insecta
- Order: Lepidoptera
- Family: Nymphalidae
- Genus: Caligo
- Species: C. teucer

Binomial name
- Caligo teucer (Linnaeus, 1758)

Synonyms
- Papilio teucer Linnaeus, 1758; Caligo teucra Hübner, [1819]; Caligo musae Fabricius, 1938; Caligo teucer phoroneus Fruhstorfer, 1907; Caligo teucer joasa Joicey & Kaye, 1917

= Caligo teucer =

Teucer owl butterfly

Species of butterfly

Caligo teucer, the Teucer owl butterfly is a butterfly of the family Nymphalidae. It was described by Carl Linnaeus his 1758 10th edition of Systema Naturae. It is found from Colombia and Venezuela to Bolivia and Paraguay. The habitat consists of rainforests and cloudforests at altitudes ranging from 400 to 1,400 meters.

The wingspan is about 100 mm.

The larvae feed on Heliconia and Musa species.

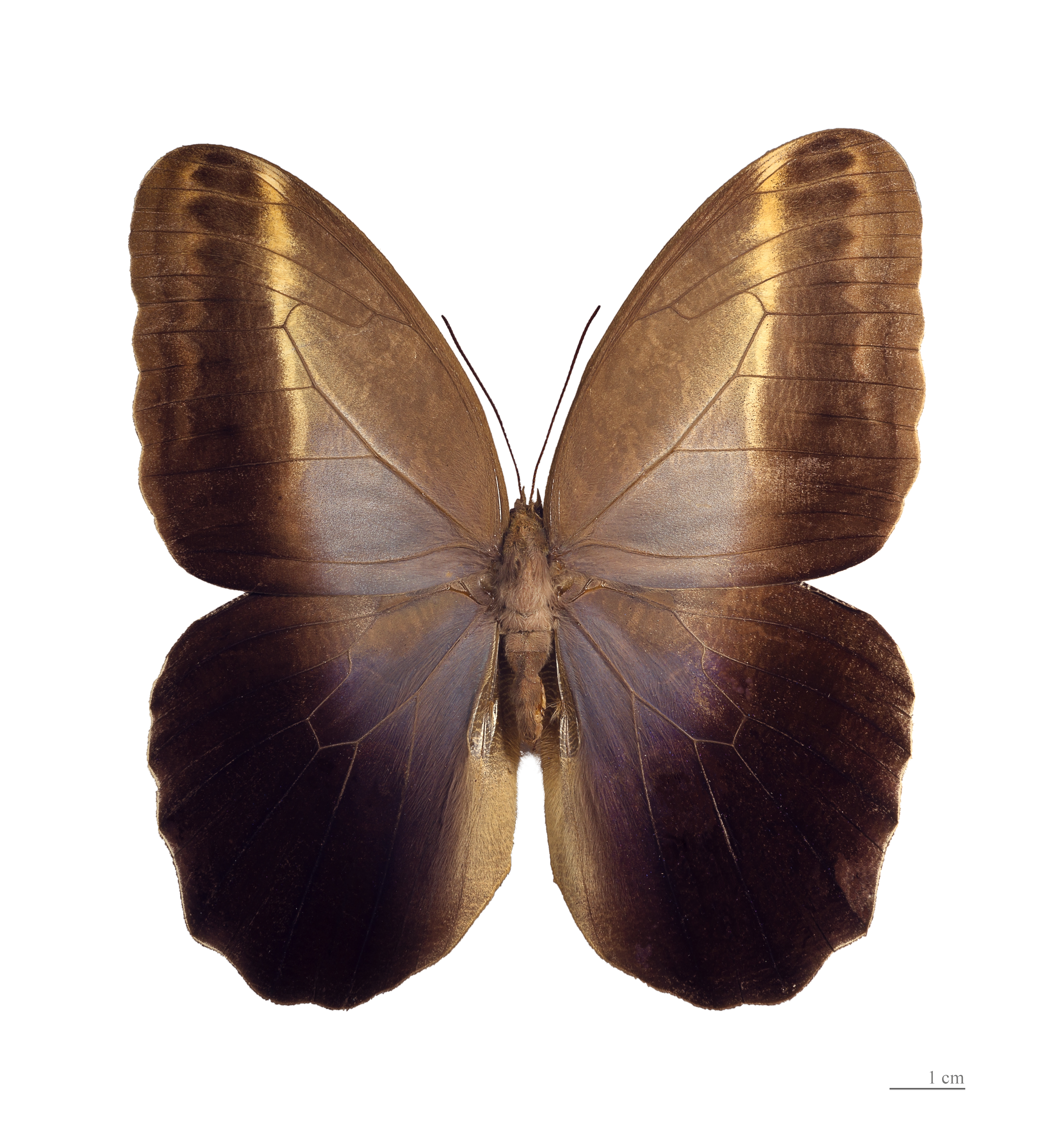
Dorsal view

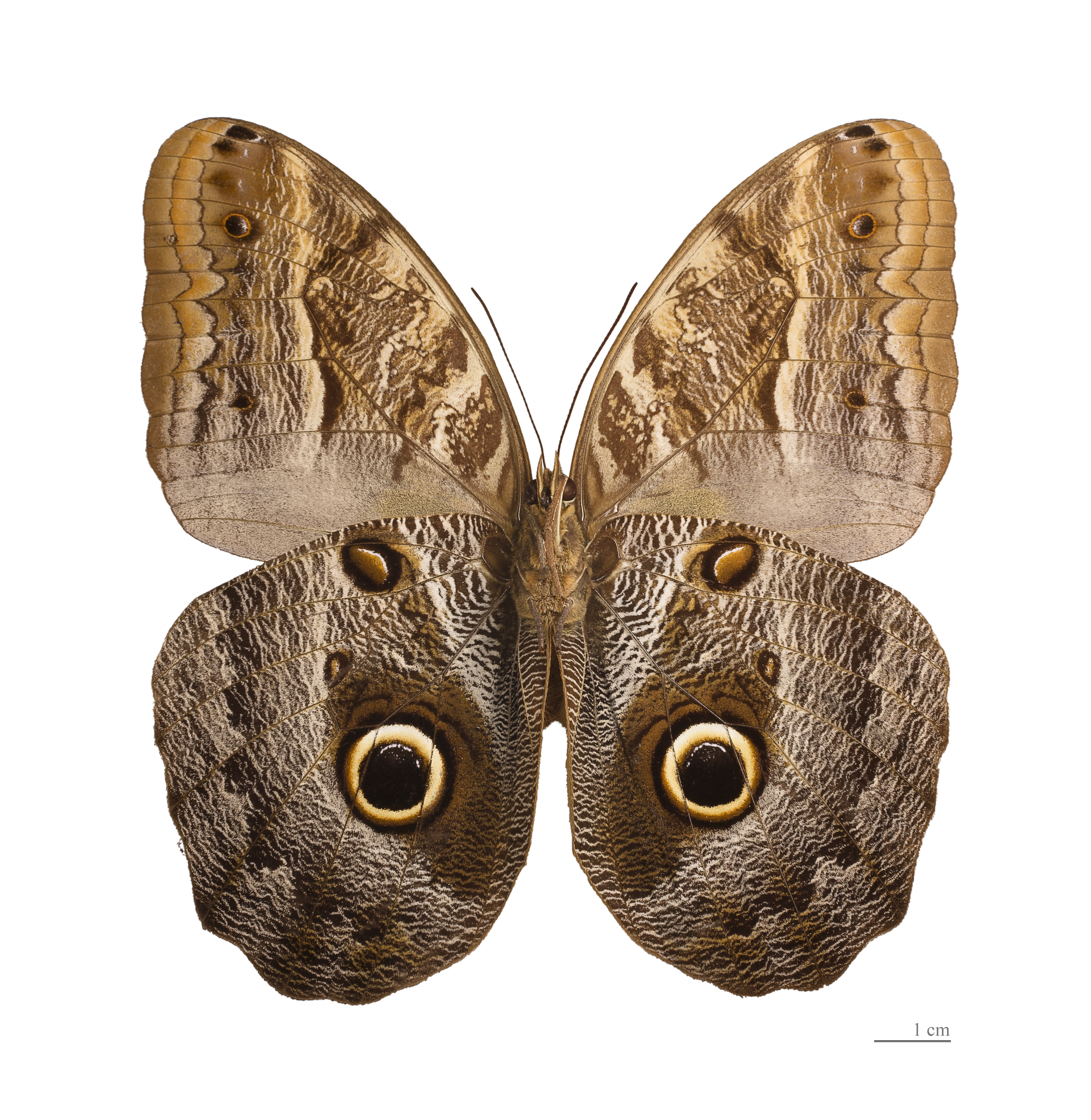
Ventral view

== Subspecies ==
- Caligo teucer teucer Linnaeus, 1758
- Caligo teucer ecuadora Joicey & Kaye, 1917 (Ecuador)
- Caligo teucer insulanus Stichel, 1904 (Trinidad)
- Caligo teucer japetus Stichel, 1903 (Paraguay)
- Caligo teucer nubilus Fruhstorfer, 1907 (Guyana)
- Caligo teucer obidonus Fruhstorfer, 1904 (Brazil: Pará, Amazonas)
- Caligo teucer phorkys Fruhstorfer, 1912 (Bolivia)
- Caligo teucer semicaerulea Joicey & Kaye, 1917 (Peru)
