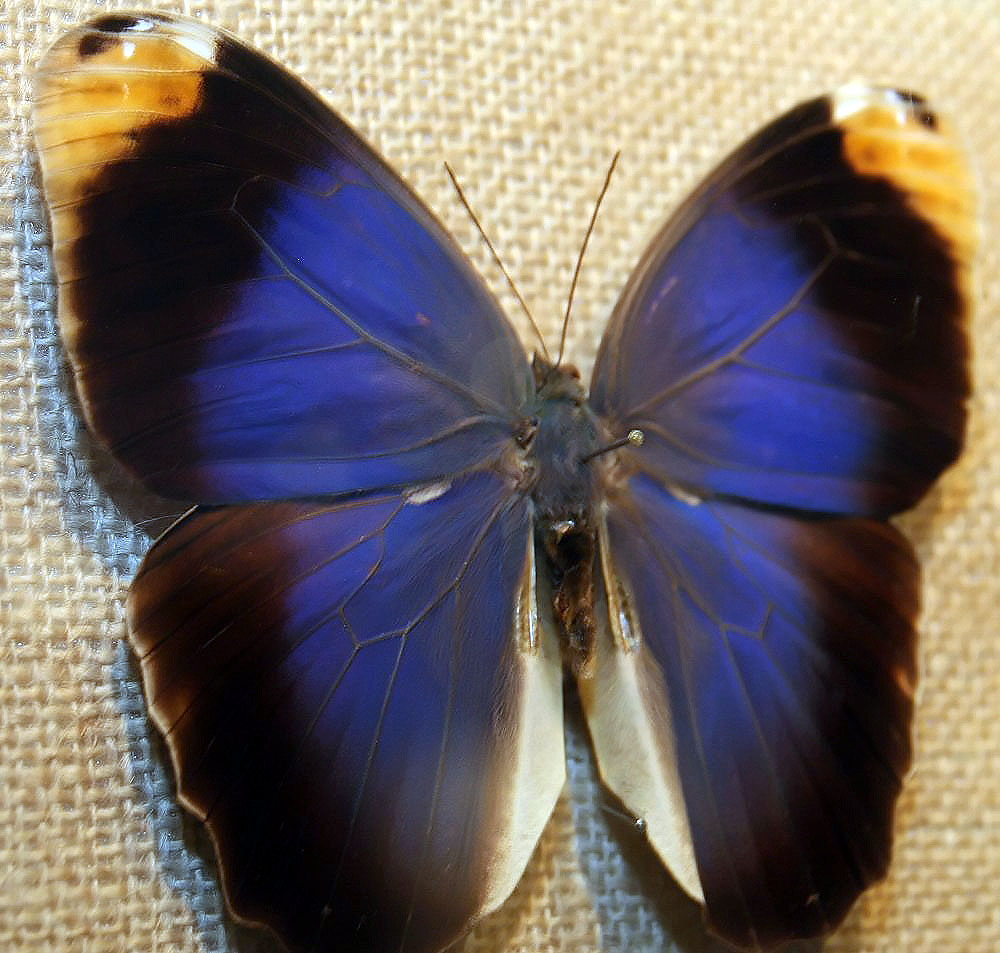

Scientific classification
- Domain: Eukaryota
- Kingdom: Animalia
- Phylum: Arthropoda
- Class: Insecta
- Order: Lepidoptera
- Family: Nymphalidae
- Genus: Caligo
- Species: C. beltrao

Binomial name
- Caligo beltrao Illiger, 1801

= Caligo beltrao =

Purple owl

Species of insect

Caligo beltrao, the purple owl, is a butterfly of the family Nymphalidae. The species can be found in Brazil.

The wingspan is about 120 mm.

The larvae feed on Canna indica, Calathea zebrina, Musa species, and Hedychium coronarium.
