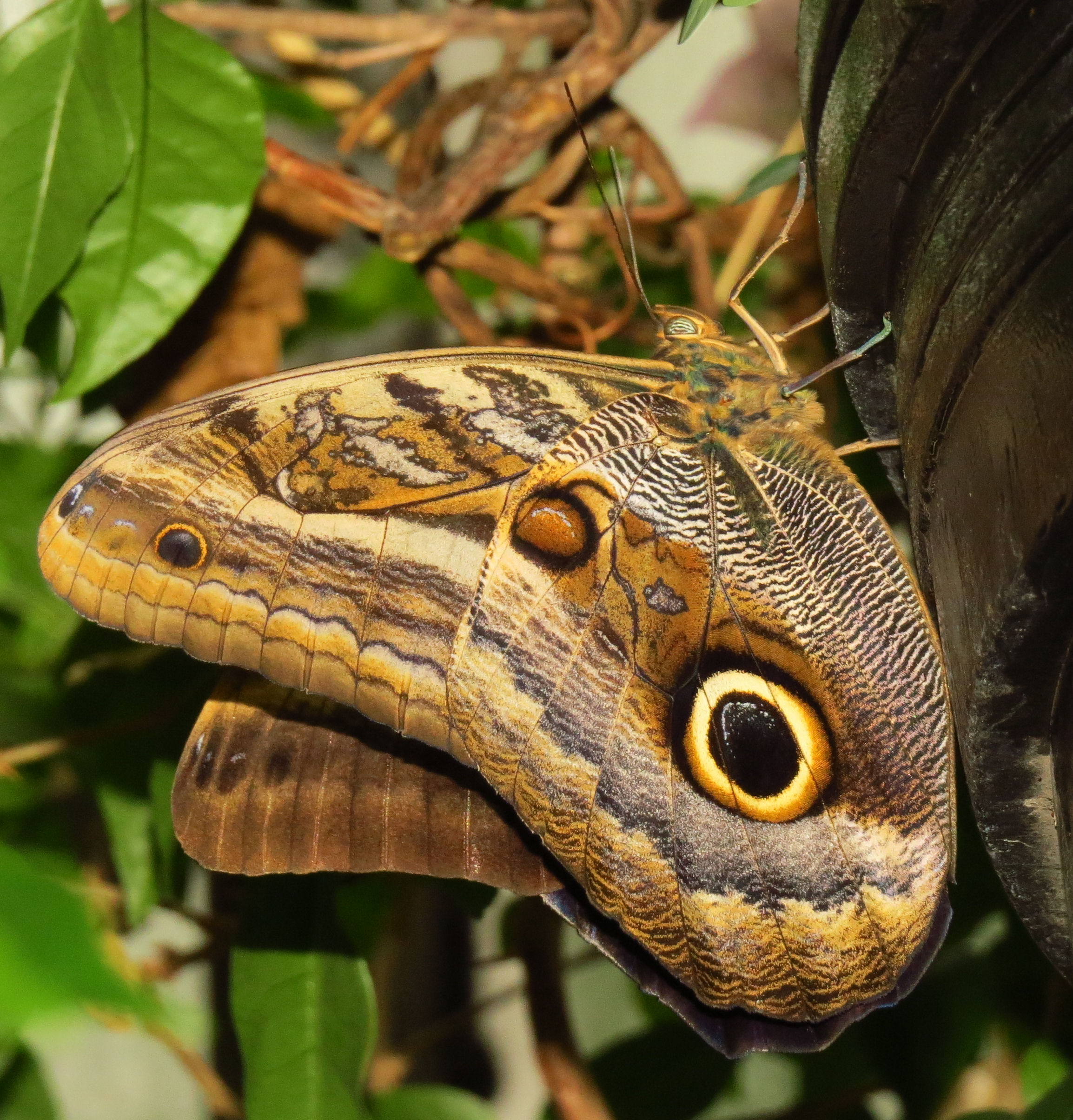
- Caligo oileus umbratilis, underside

Scientific classification
- Domain: Eukaryota
- Kingdom: Animalia
- Phylum: Arthropoda
- Class: Insecta
- Order: Lepidoptera
- Family: Nymphalidae
- Genus: Caligo
- Species: C. oileus

Binomial name
- Caligo oileus C. & R. Felder, 1861

Synonyms
- Pavonia scamander Boisduval, 1870; Caligo oileus var. philademus Staudinger, 1887; Caligo phorbas Röber, 1904; Caligo oileus philinos Fruhstorfer, 1903

= Caligo oileus =

Oileus giant owl

Species of butterfly

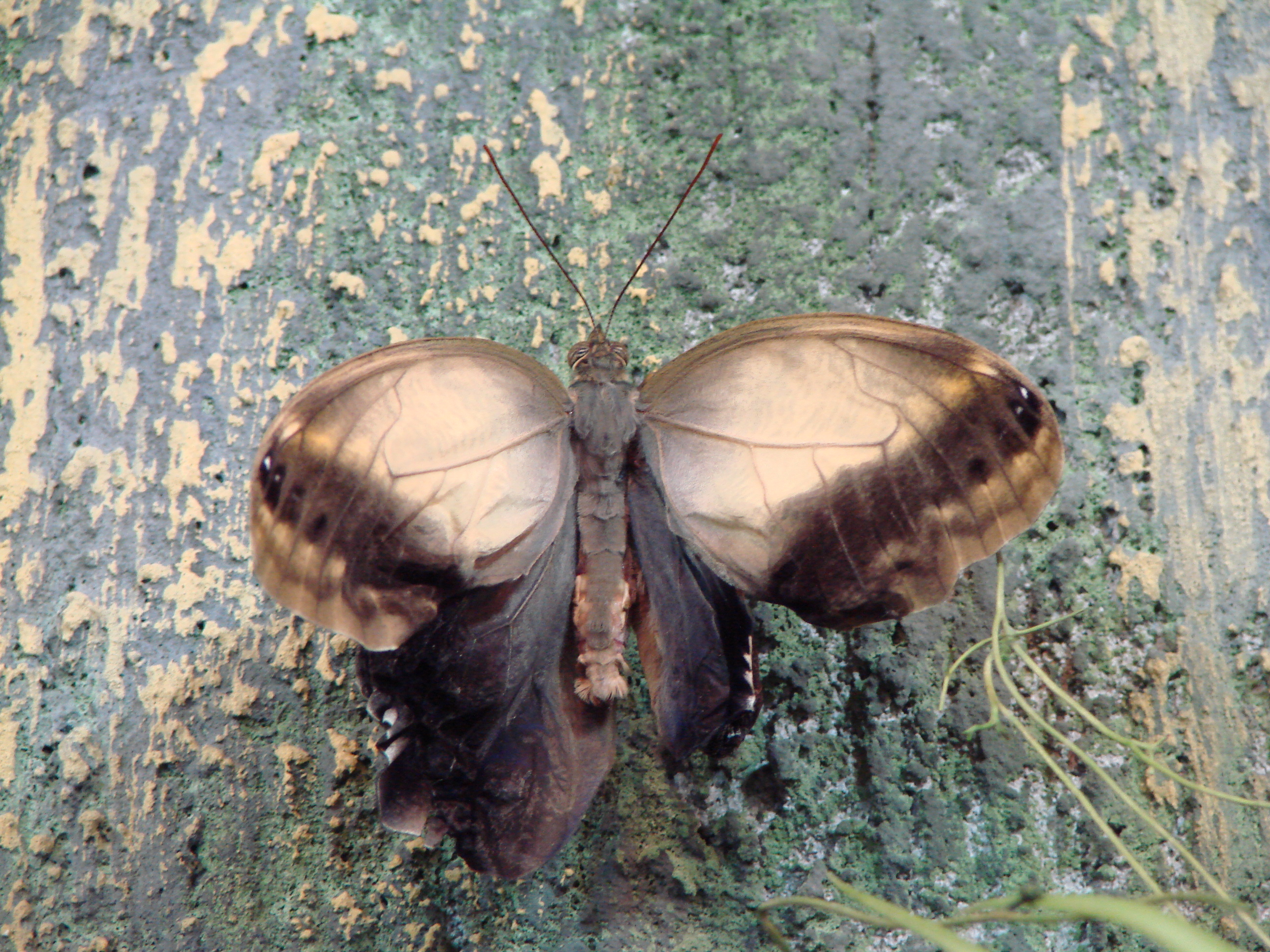
Topside

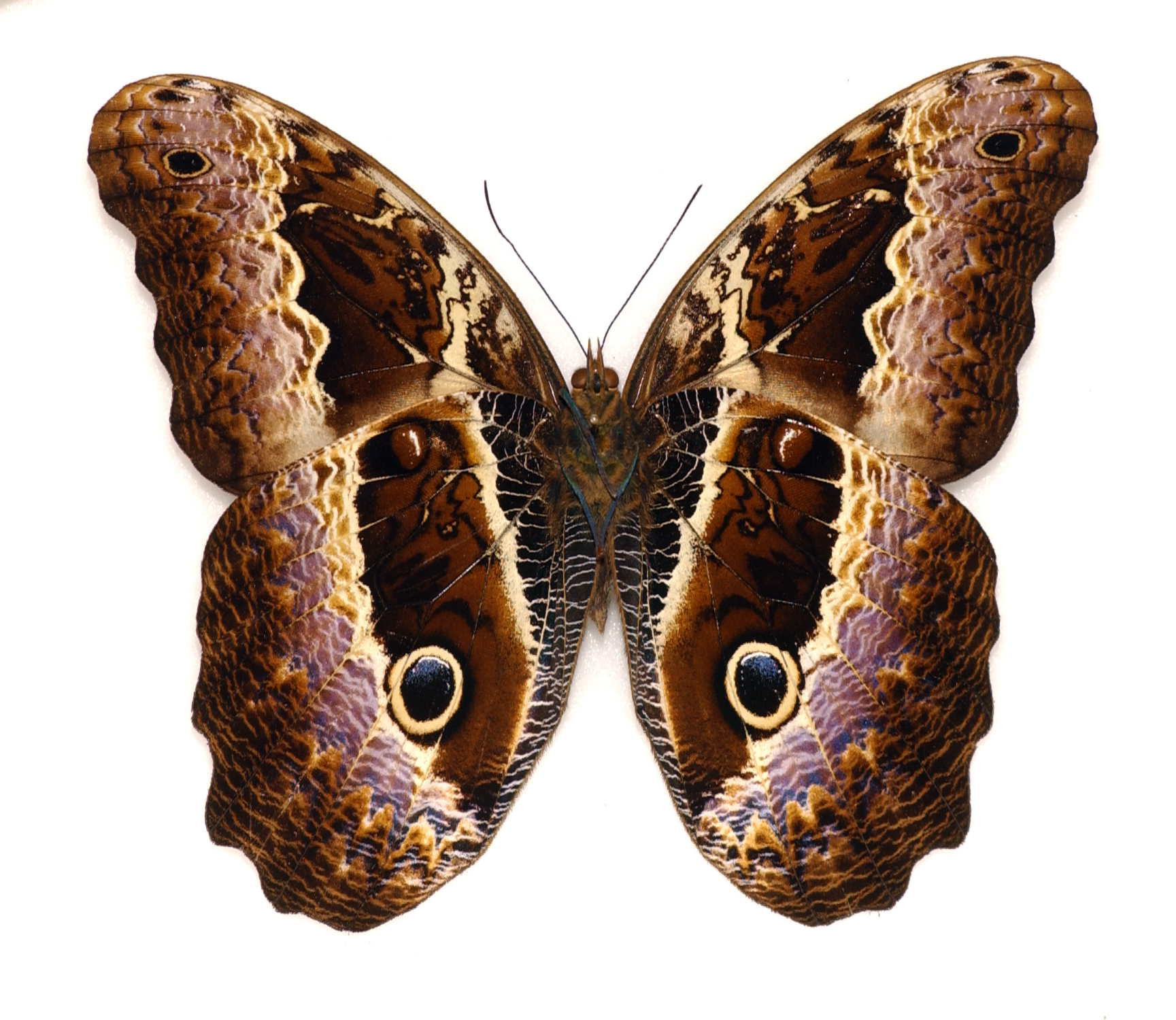
Male (underside), from Musée d'histoire naturelle de Lille

Caligo oileus, the Oileus giant owl, is a butterfly of the family Nymphalidae.

The species can be found from Mexico to northern South America.

The larvae feed on Heliconia and Musa species.

== Subspecies ==
- Caligo oileus oileus (Venezuela, Colombia)
- Caligo oileus scamander (Boisduval, 1870) (Colombia, Ecuador)
- Caligo oileus umbratilis Stichel, 1903 (Peru)
