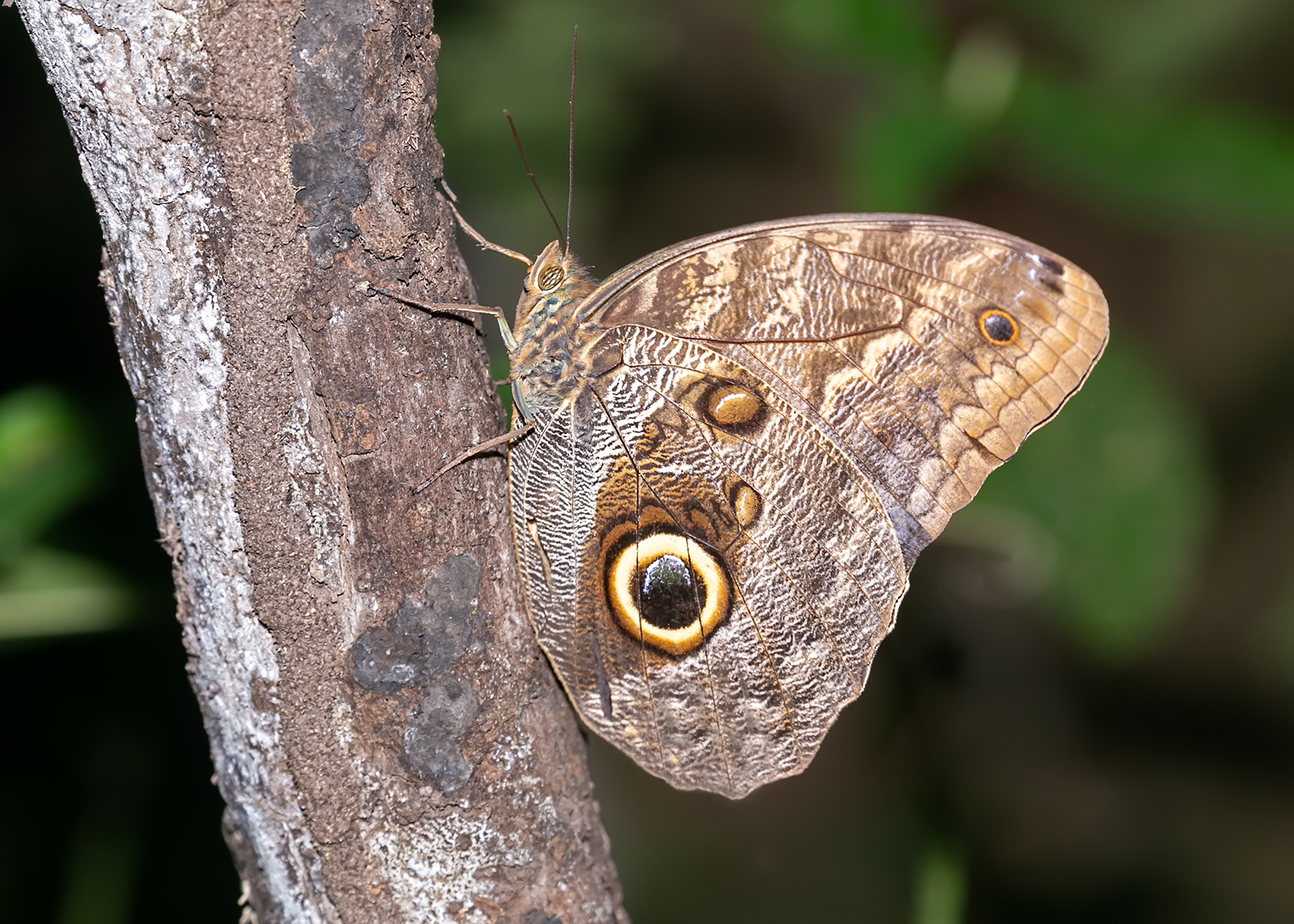

Scientific classification
- Domain: Eukaryota
- Kingdom: Animalia
- Phylum: Arthropoda
- Class: Insecta
- Order: Lepidoptera
- Family: Nymphalidae
- Genus: Caligo
- Species: C. brasiliensis

Binomial name
- Caligo brasiliensis (Baron Cajetan von Felder, 1862)

Synonyms
- Pavonia brasiliensis C. Felder, 1862; Pavonia galba Deyrolle, 1874

= Caligo brasiliensis =

Species of butterfly

Caligo brasiliensis, the Brazilian owl, sulanus owl, or almond-eyed owl, is a butterfly of the family Nymphalidae. The species can be found in most of South America as various subspecies, including Brazil, Colombia, Venezuela and Ecuador. Its range extends through Trinidad, Honduras, Guatemala and Panama north to Mexico.

The larvae of the nominate subspecies have been recorded on Euterpe edulis, Musa species, and Hedychium coronarium. The larvae of subspecies sulanus have been recorded on Heliconia, Calathea, and Musa species.

== Subspecies ==
- Caligo brasiliensis brasiliensis (Brazil)
- Caligo brasiliensis galba (Colombia)
- Caligo brasiliensis caesius (Venezuela)
- Caligo brasiliensis morpheus (Ecuador, Colombia)
- Caligo brasiliensis minor (Trinidad)
- Caligo brasiliensis sulanus (Honduras, Guatemala, Panama, Mexico)
