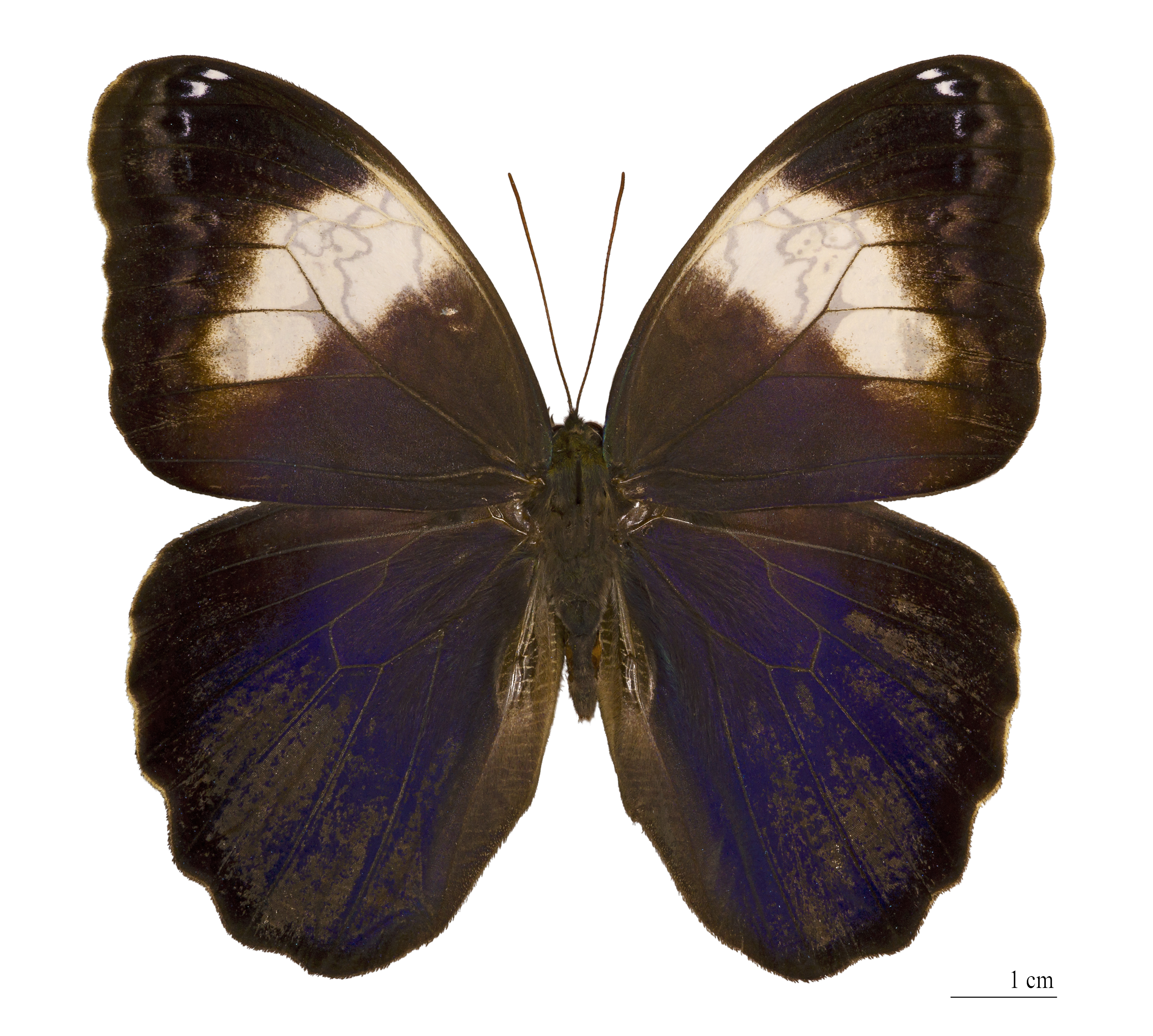

Scientific classification
- Domain: Eukaryota
- Kingdom: Animalia
- Phylum: Arthropoda
- Class: Insecta
- Order: Lepidoptera
- Family: Nymphalidae
- Genus: Caligo
- Species: C. martia

Binomial name
- Caligo martia (Godart, [1824])

Synonyms
- Morpho martia Godart, [1824]

= Caligo martia =

Species of butterfly

Caligo martia is a butterfly of the family Nymphalidae. The species can be found in Brazil.

The larvae feed on Echinochloa crus-galli and Pennisetum purpureum.

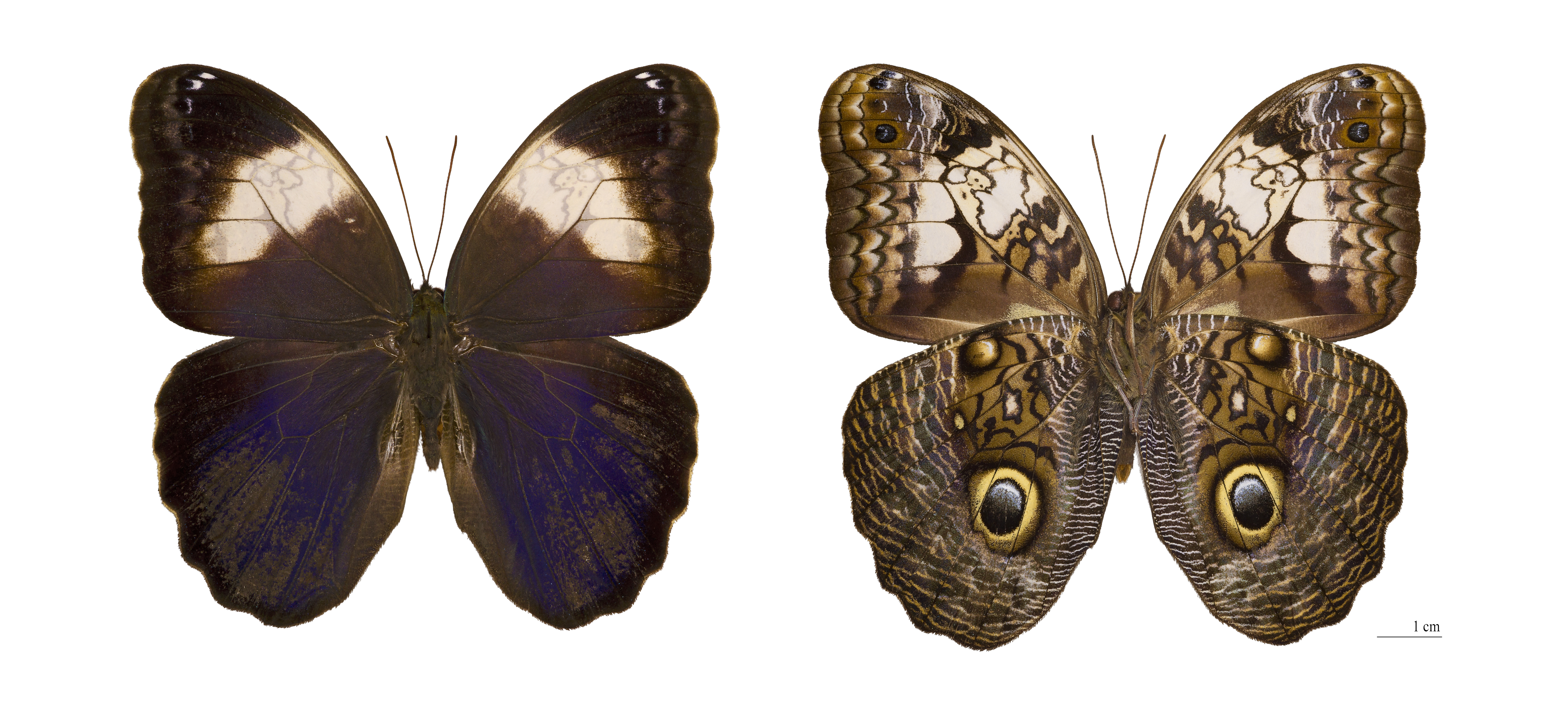
Dorsal (left) and ventral (right) view of a museum specimen
