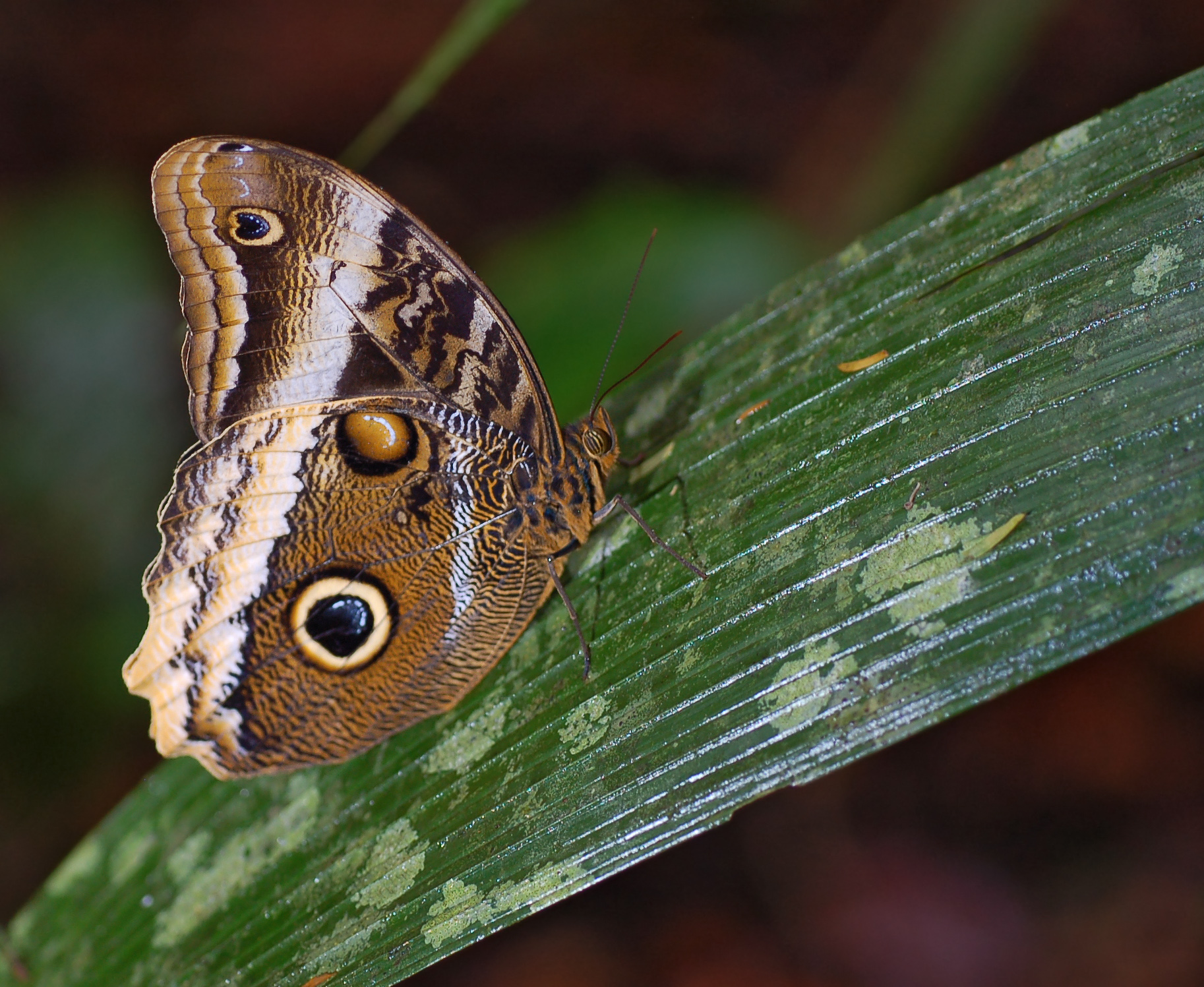

Scientific classification
- Domain: Eukaryota
- Kingdom: Animalia
- Phylum: Arthropoda
- Class: Insecta
- Order: Lepidoptera
- Family: Nymphalidae
- Genus: Caligo
- Species: C. atreus

Binomial name
- Caligo atreus Kollar, 1850

= Caligo atreus =

Yellow-edged giant owl

Species of butterfly

Caligo atreus, the yellow-edged giant owl, is a butterfly of the family Nymphalidae. The species can be found from Mexico to Peru.

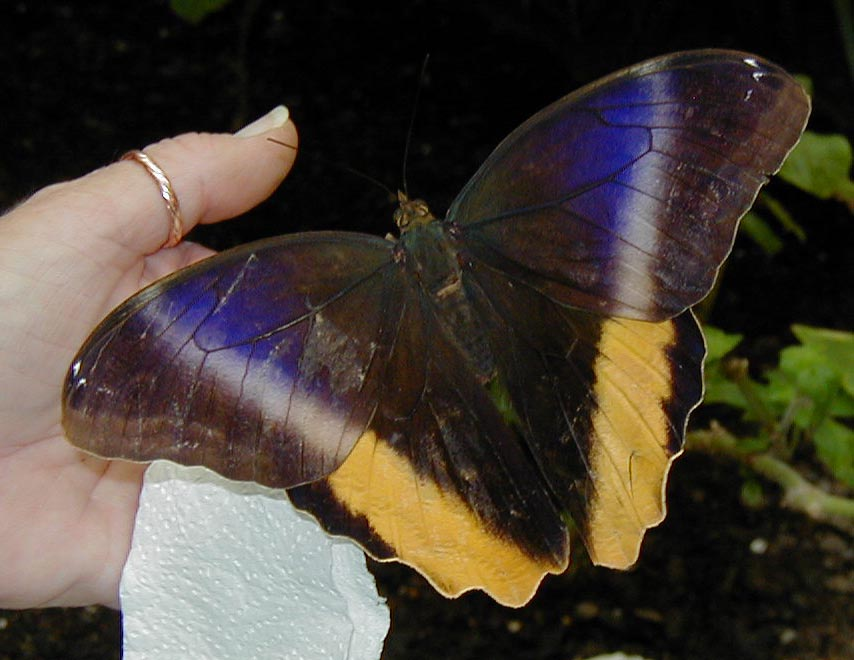
Upperside

The wingspan is 140–160 mm.

The larvae feed on Musa and Heliconia species and can be a pest for banana cultivation. Adults feed on juices of rotting fruit.

Adults are known for their relatively long lifespan compared to other butterflies. Up to 3-4+ months. Adults are slow and often are attacked by birds. Adult males remaining inactive for most of the day until around 6 AM and 6 PM for an hour.

Chrysalis mimic dead leaves with shiny gold spots. They remain in this stage for about 22 days until emerging.

Adults are common in butterfly houses because of their relative ease to breed.
