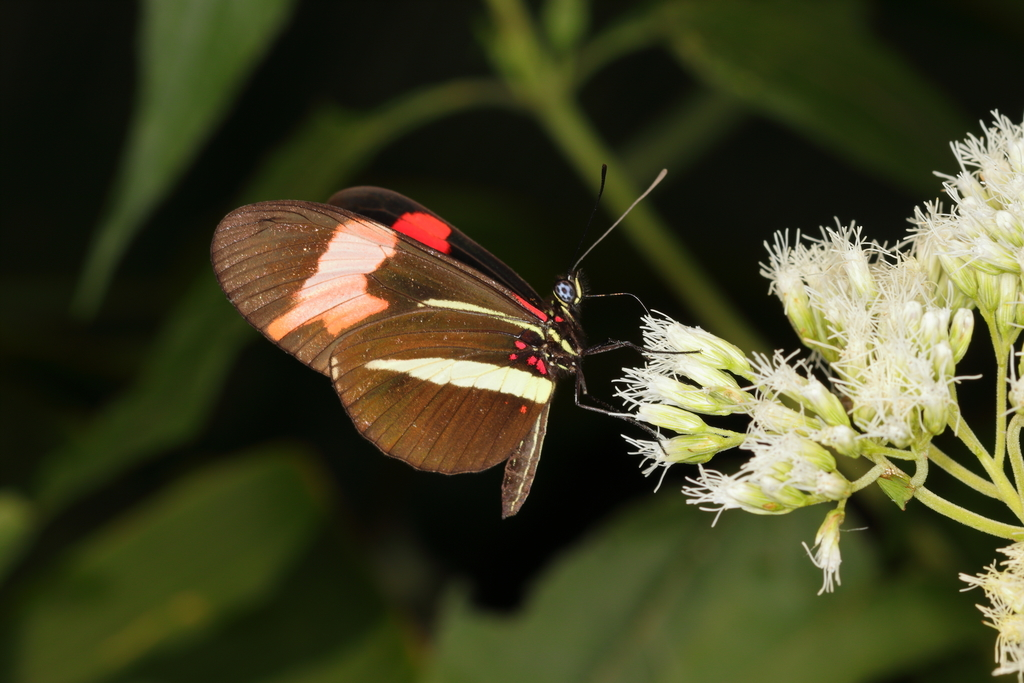
- Ventral surface, Cubatão, Sao Paulo, Brazil

Scientific classification
- Domain: Eukaryota
- Kingdom: Animalia
- Phylum: Arthropoda
- Class: Insecta
- Order: Lepidoptera
- Family: Nymphalidae
- Genus: Heliconius
- Species: H. erato
- Subspecies: H. e. phyllis

Trinomial name
- Heliconius erato phyllis (Fabricius, 1775)

= Heliconius erato phyllis =

Subspecies of butterfly

Heliconius erato phyllis is a subspecies or geographical race of Heliconius erato that occurs in Brazil (south of the Amazon Basin, Atlantic coastal forest and Mato Grosso), Paraguay, Uruguay, northern Argentina and Bolivia. It has the largest range of any H. erato subspecies.

There are two very similar, sympatric Heliconius species with which H. erato phyllis may be confused: Heliconius besckei (Ménétriès, 1857), a member of the silvaniform group (mainly orange, yellow and black "tiger mimics"), and Heliconius melpomene, races nanna Stichel, 1899 and burchelli Poulton, 1910.

Key characters present only in H. erato phyllis relative to these others are:

There are often red basal hindwing spots on dorsal and ventral surfaces, above and/or below the yellow stripe (if present, these are diagnostic);

There are pale, whitish spots at the apex of the ventral hindwing;

The inner margin of the red forewing band is deeply concave (visible on both wing surfaces);

The posterior edge or the red forewing band almost never extends below vein Cu2.

The yellow hindwing stripe in H. erato phyllis bends downward toward the apex, rather than towards the costal margin, as in the Central American H. erato petiverana.

In H. melpomene nanna, H. melpomene burchelli, and H. besckei, the red forewing band usually extends below vein Cu2, and its inner margin is less concave.

A unique diagnostic feature of H. besckei is the presence of an orange-red marginal stripe on the ventral hindwing.
