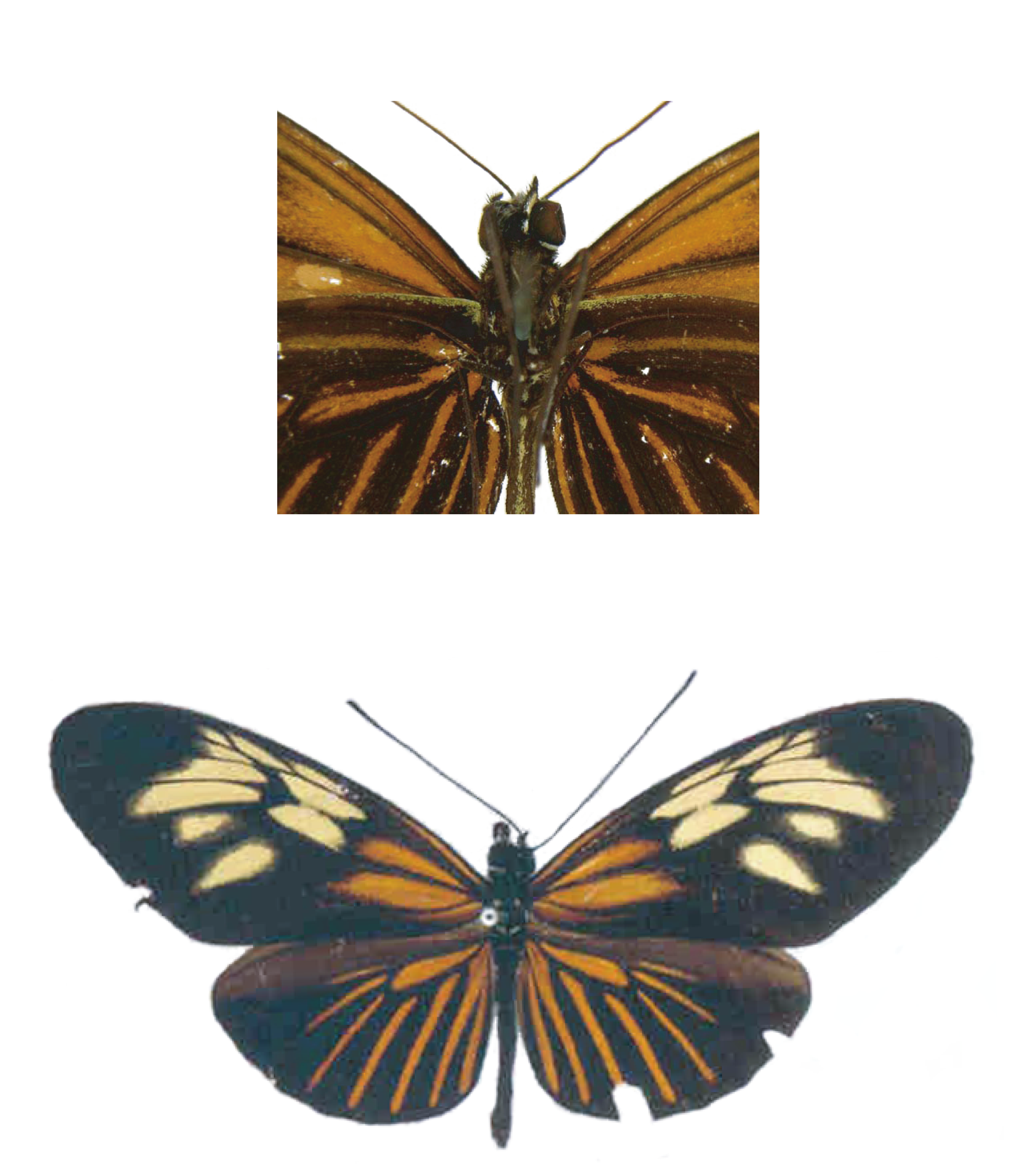
- Dorsal and ventral view

Scientific classification
- Domain: Eukaryota
- Kingdom: Animalia
- Phylum: Arthropoda
- Class: Insecta
- Order: Lepidoptera
- Family: Nymphalidae
- Genus: Heliconius
- Species: H. eratosignis

Binomial name
- Heliconius eratosignis (Joicey & Talbot, 1925)

Synonyms
- Heliconius demeter eratosignis (Joicey & Talbot, 1925); Eueides eratosignis Joicey & Talbot, 1925

= Heliconius eratosignis =

Species of butterfly

Heliconius eratosignis, the eratosignis longwing, is a butterfly of the family Nymphalidae. It was described by James John Joicey and George Talbot in 1925. It is found in the south-western Amazon basin, from Brazil to Peru and Bolivia. The habitat consists of sandy rainforests.

The larvae are gregarious and feed on species in the Passiflora subgenera Astrophea and Mitostemma. Full-grown larvae have a yellow body with black bands and a black head. They reach a length of about 20 mm.

Adult H. eratosignis are distinguished morphologically from their sister species Heliconius demeter because they lack a yellow streak on the base of the forewing costa underside; in contrast, H. eratosignis has a solid orange basal costal margin on the underside of the forewing. Keith S. Brown and Woodruff W. Benson in 1975 argued the two forms were the same species, but recorded both H. eratosignis gregarious and H. demeter solitary larvae in their paper. The Tree of Life Web Project has yet to recognize H. eratosignis as a separate species, but shows an image of a male Heliconius eratosignis from Peru under the description of H. demeter.

== Etymology ==
The species is presumably named because it is difficult to distinguish from Heliconius erato (as well as from its sister species Heliconius demeter).

== Subspecies ==
- H. e. eratosignis (Joicey & Talbot, 1925) (Eueides) (Brazil (MT))
- H. e. tambopata Lamas, 1985 (Peru)
- H. e. ucayalensis H. Holzinger & R. Holzinger, 1975 (Peru)
- H. e. ulysses K. S. Brown & Benson, 1975 (Bolivia)
