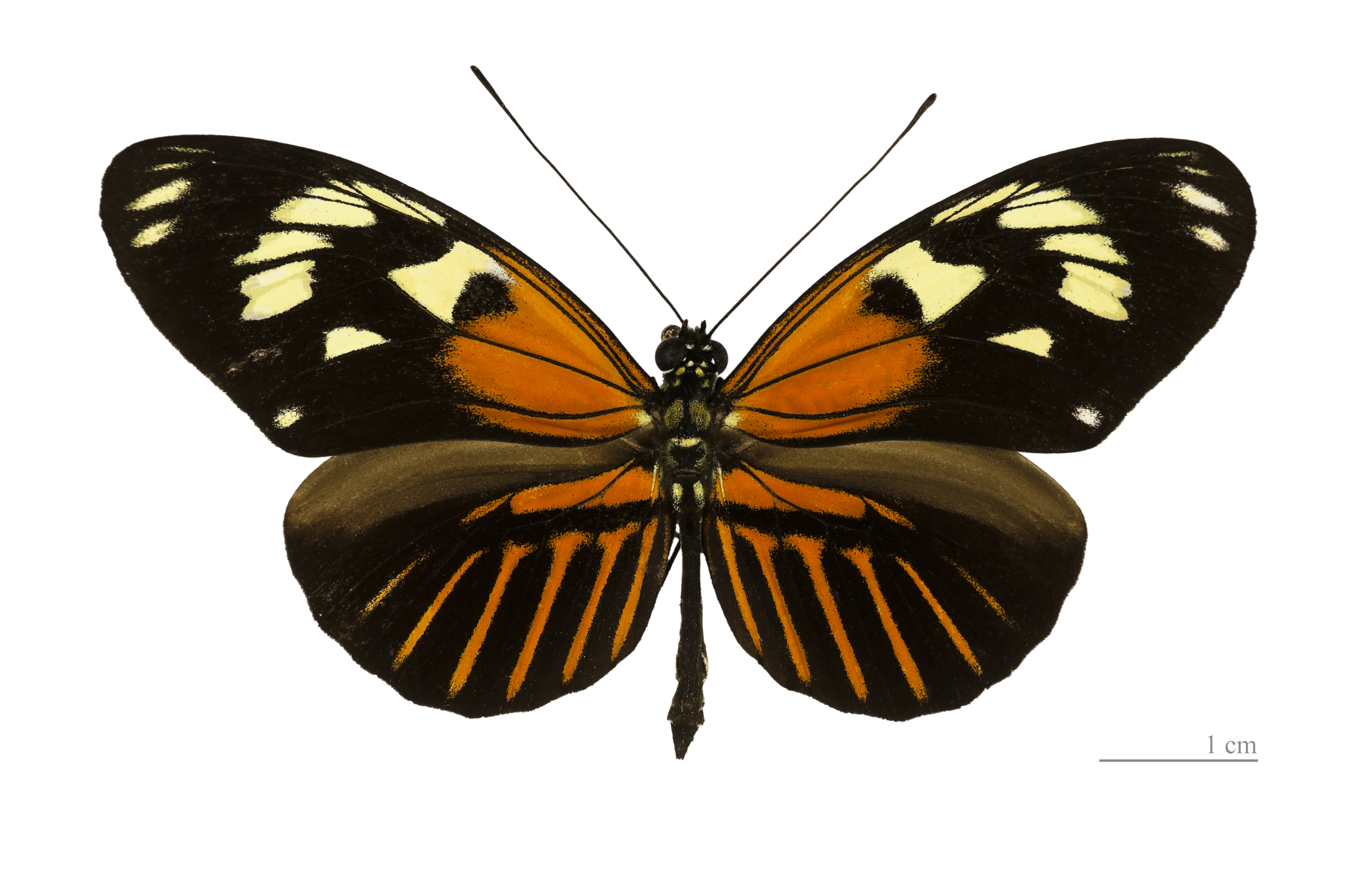
- Dorsal view
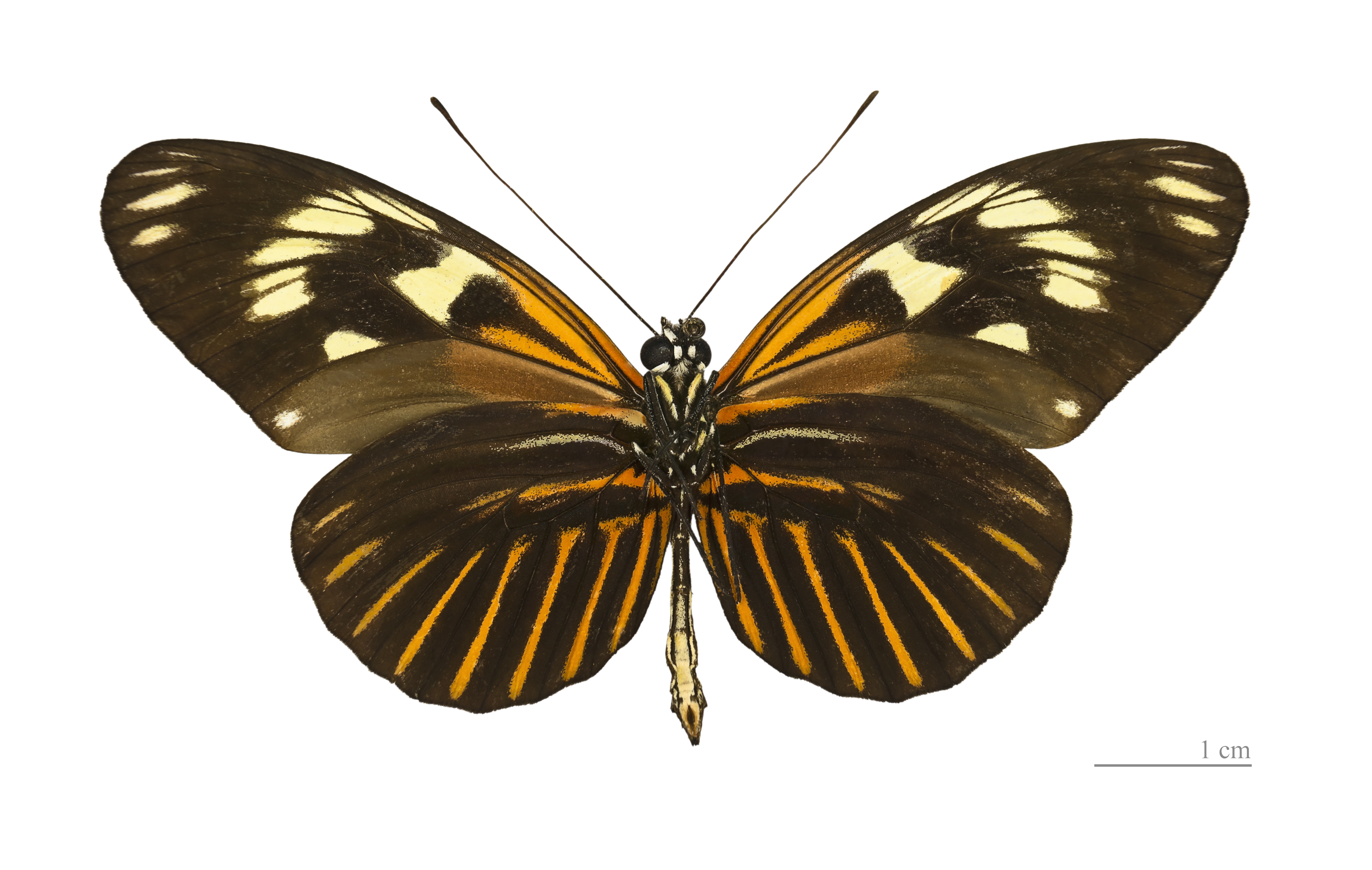
- Ventral view

Scientific classification
- Kingdom: Animalia
- Phylum: Arthropoda
- Class: Insecta
- Order: Lepidoptera
- Family: Nymphalidae
- Genus: Heliconius
- Species: H. elevatus

Binomial name
- Heliconius elevatus (Nöldner, 1901)

Synonyms
- Heliconius elevatus f. griseoviridis Neustetter, 1938; Heliconia bari Oberthür, 1902; Heliconius melpomene thelxiope f. aquilina Neustetter, 1925; Heliconius elevatus f. nigromacula Neustetter, 1932; Heliconius elevatus f. nöldneri Neustetter, 1938

= Heliconius elevatus =

Species of butterfly

Heliconius elevatus is a butterfly of the family Nymphalidae native to the Amazon Basin.

== Description ==
The larvae are gregarious and mostly feed on Passiflora species. They reach a length of about 16 mm.

== Taxonomy ==
=== Publication ===
It was published by Emil Nöldner in 1901.

=== Subspecies ===
- Heliconius elevatus elevatus (Peru)
- Heliconius elevatus bari Oberthür, 1902 (French Guiana)
- Heliconius elevatus lapis Lamas, 1976 (Peru)
- Heliconius elevatus perchlora Joicey & Kaye, 1917 (Bolivia)
- Heliconius elevatus pseudocupidineus Neustetter, 1931 (Peru)
- Heliconius elevatus roraima Turner, 1966 (Guyana)
- Heliconius elevatus schmidt-mummi Takahashi, 1977 (Brazil)
- Heliconius elevatus schmassmanni Joicey & Talbot, 1925 (Brazil: Mato Grosso, Rondônia)
- Heliconius elevatus sonjae Neukirchen, 1997 (Brazil: Pará)
- Heliconius elevatus taracuanus Bryk, 1953 (Brazil: Amazonas)
- Heliconius elevatus tumatumari Kaye, 1906 (Guyana)
- Heliconius elevatus willmotti Neukirchen, 1997 (Ecuador)
- Heliconius elevatus zoelleri Neukirchen, 1990 (Venezuela)

=== Hybrid speciation ===
Parent species of Heliconius elevatus Nöldner, 1901

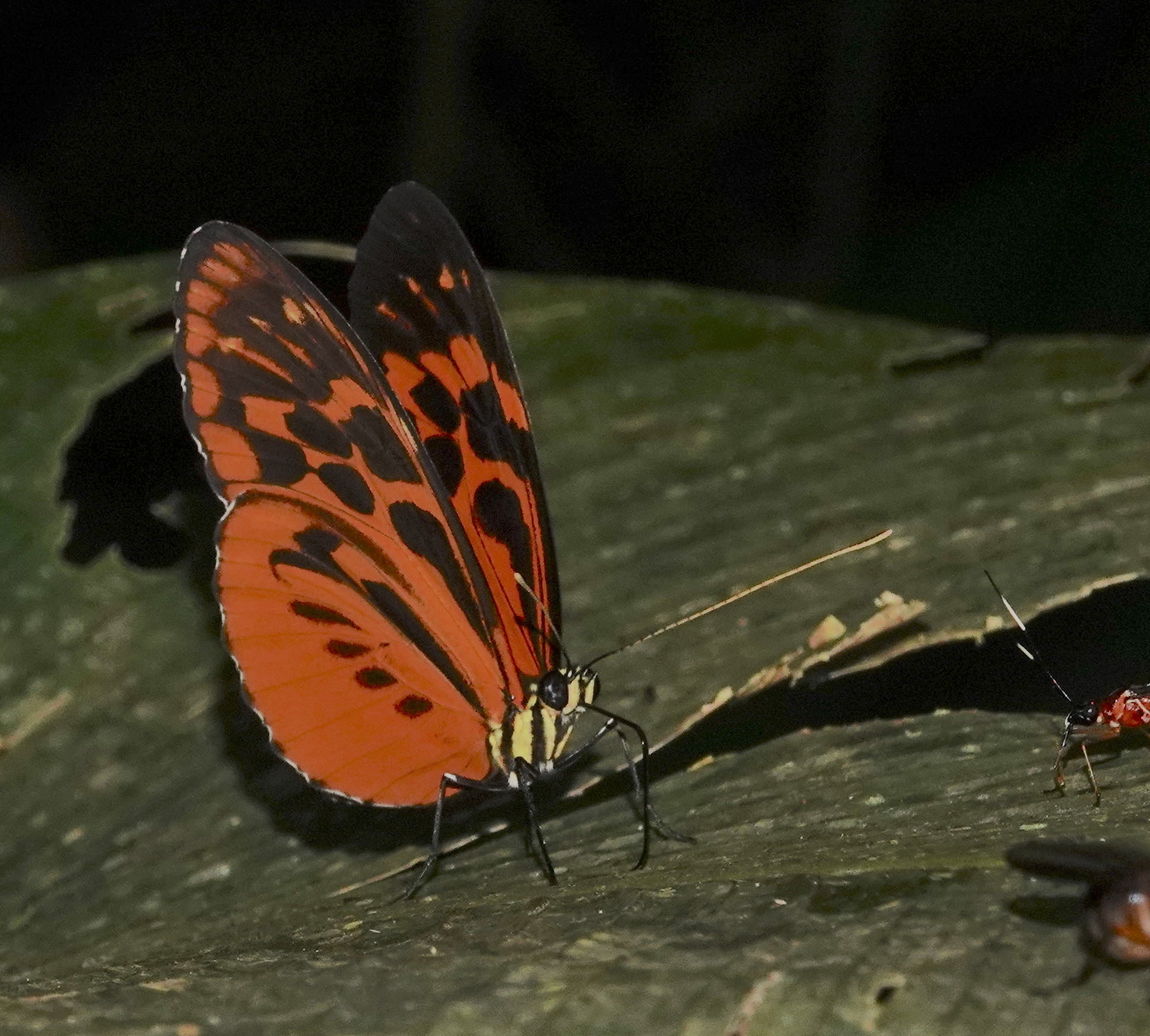
Heliconius pardalinus Bates, 1862

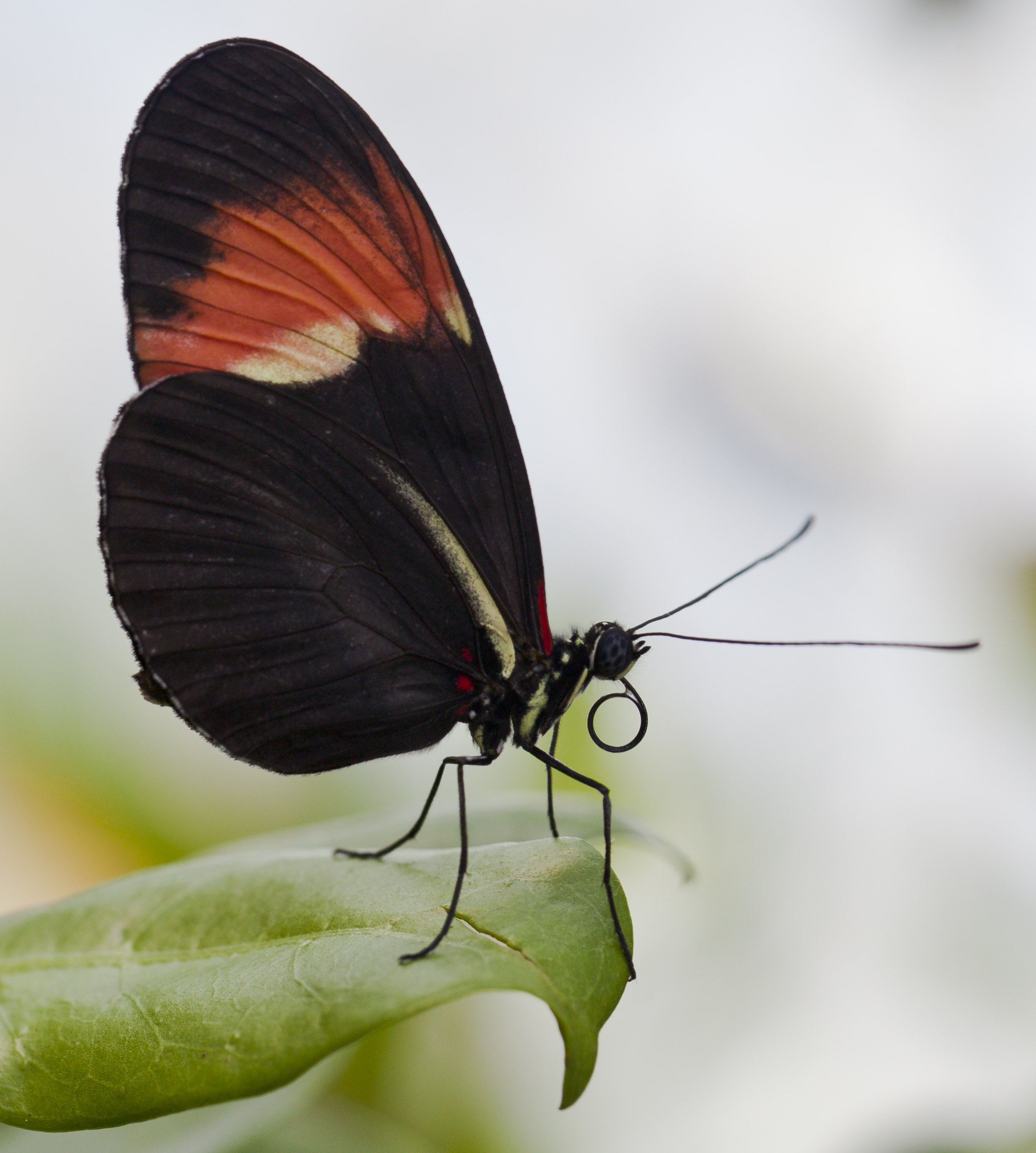
Heliconius melpomene Linnaeus, 1758

Heliconius elevatus resulted from hybrid speciation involving the parent species Heliconius pardalinus and Heliconius melpomene.

== Ecology ==
=== Herbivory ===
Heliconius elevatus feeds on Passiflora.

=== Habitat ===
It inhabits riparian forests at an elevation of 0-2000 m above sea level.
