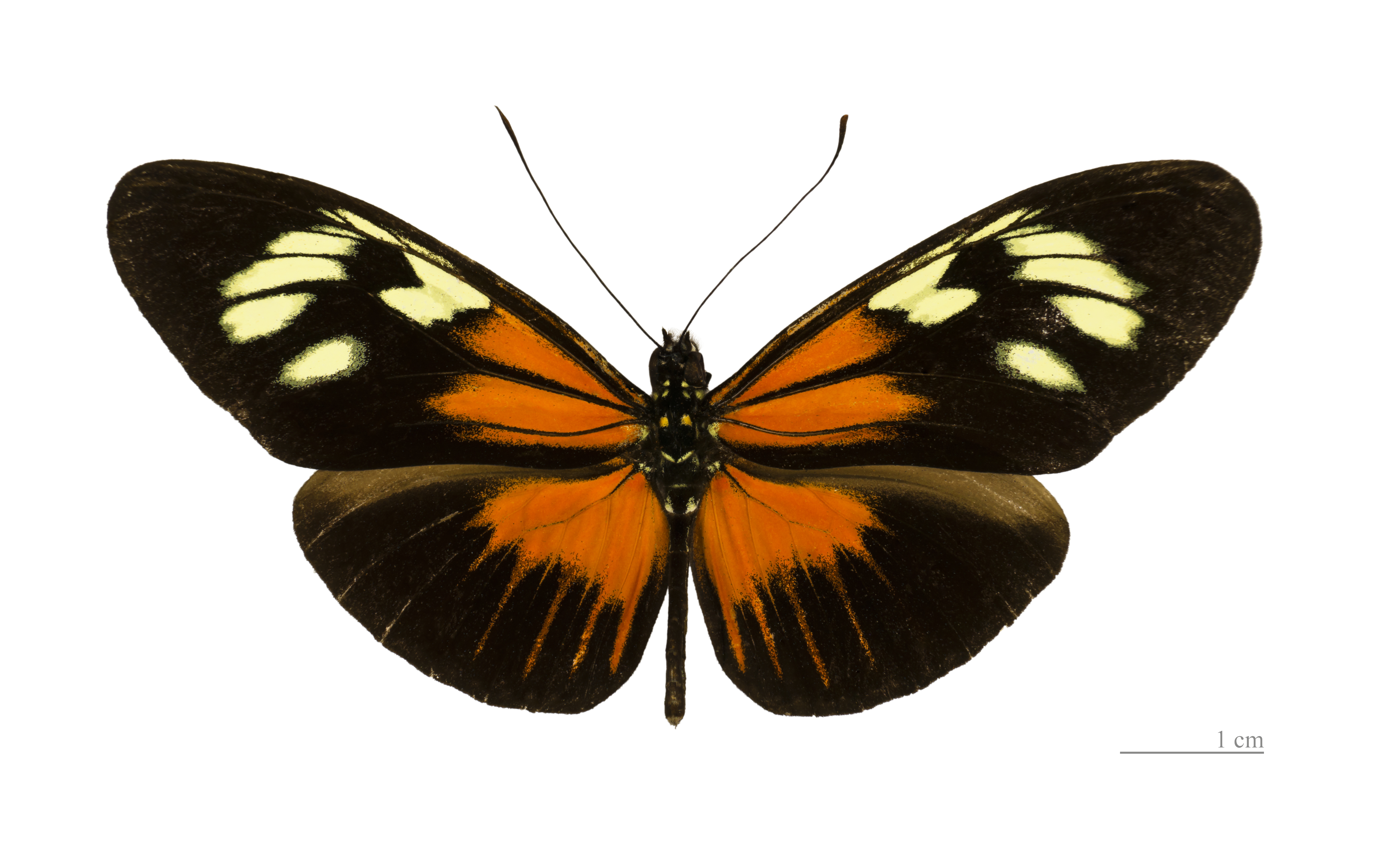
- Dorsal view
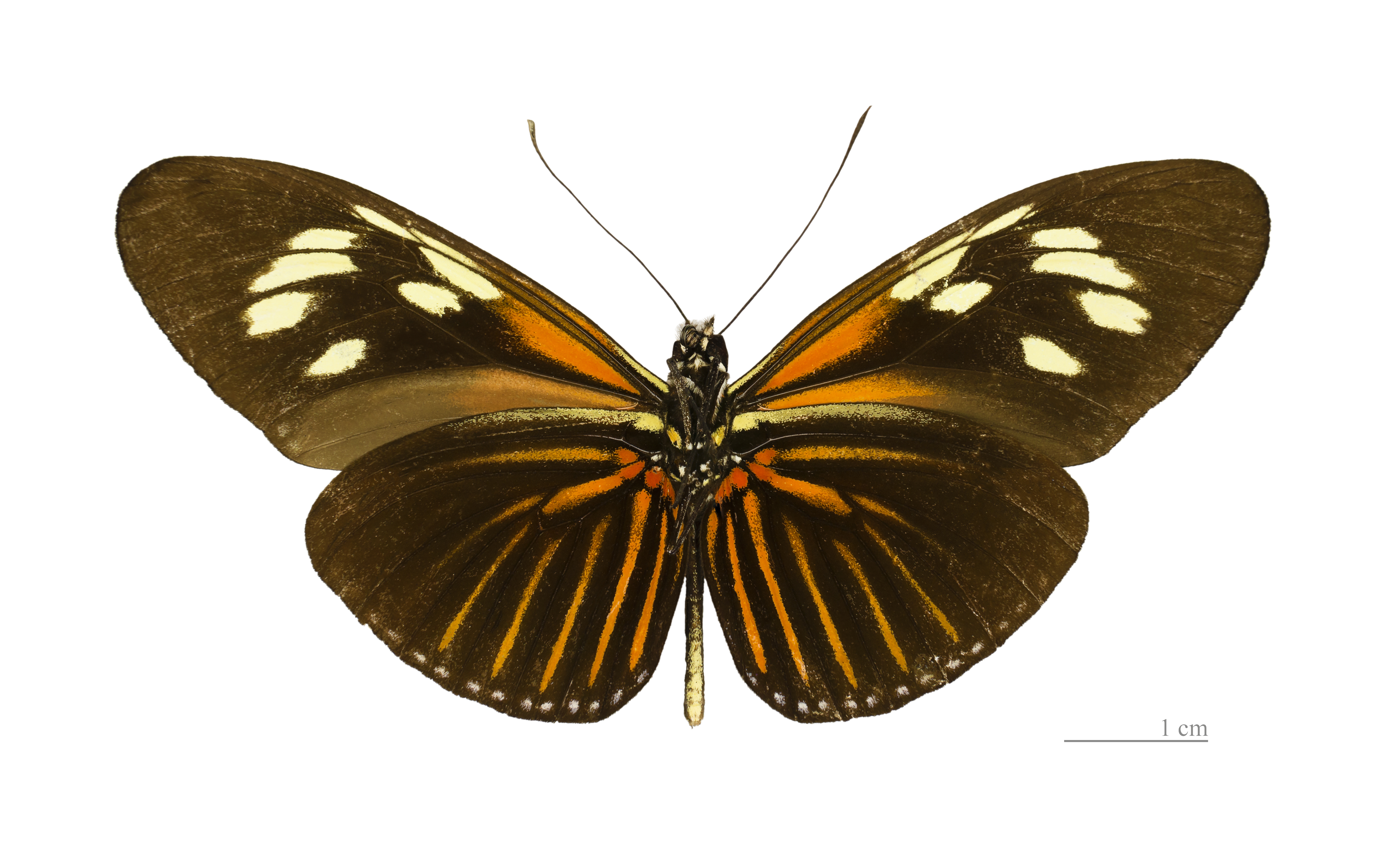
- Ventral view

Scientific classification
- Domain: Eukaryota
- Kingdom: Animalia
- Phylum: Arthropoda
- Class: Insecta
- Order: Lepidoptera
- Family: Nymphalidae
- Genus: Heliconius
- Species: H. demeter

Binomial name
- Heliconius demeter Staudinger, 1897

Synonyms
- Heliconius demeter f. similis Neustetter, 1931; Heliconius demeter var. bouqueti Nöldner, 1901; Heliconia xanthoceras Oberthür, 1902; Heliconia eueidina Oberthür, 1916; Eueides egeriformis Joicey & Kaye, 1917; Heliconia automatia Oberthür, 1925; Heliconius eratoformis Neustetter, 1931

= Heliconius demeter =

Species of butterfly

Heliconius demeter, the Demeter longwing, is a butterfly of the family Nymphalidae. It was described by Otto Staudinger in 1897. It is found in the Northern and Eastern part of the Amazon basin, from Guyana to Northern Brazil and Peru. The habitat consists of sandy rainforests.

The larvae are solitary and feed on Dilkea (Passifloraceae) species. They reach a length of about 20 mm.

Adult H. demeter are distinguished morphologically from their sister species Heliconius eratosignis because they have a yellow streak on the base of the forewing costa underside; in contrast, Heliconius eratosignis has a solid orange basal costal margin on the underside of the forewing. Brown & Benson in 1975 recognized these differences but argued that the two forms were subspecies of the same species. They also recorded both Heliconius eratosignis gregarious and H. demeter solitary larvae in their paper. The Tree of Life web project has yet to recognize Heliconius eratosignis as a separate species, but shows an image of a male Heliconius eratosignis from Peru under the description of H. demeter.

== Etymology ==
The species is named after the Greek goddess Demeter.

== Subspecies ==
- H. d. demeter Staudinger, 1897 (Peru, Brazil: Amazonas)
- H. d. angeli Neukirchen, 1997 (Peru)
- H. d. beebei Turner, 1966 (Guyana)
- H. d. bouqueti Nöldner, 1901 (French Guiana)
- H. d. joroni Lamas & Rosser, 2019 (Peru)
- H. d. karinae Neukirchen, 1990 (Brazil: Pará)
- H. d. neildi Neukirchen, 1997 (Ecuador)
- H. d. terrasanta Brown & Benson, 1975 (Brazil: Pará)
- H. d. titan Neukirchen, 1995 (Brazil: Amazonas)
- H. d. turneri Brown & Benson, 1975 (Brazil: Amazonas)
- H. d. zikani Brown & Benson, 1975 (Brazil: Amazonas)
