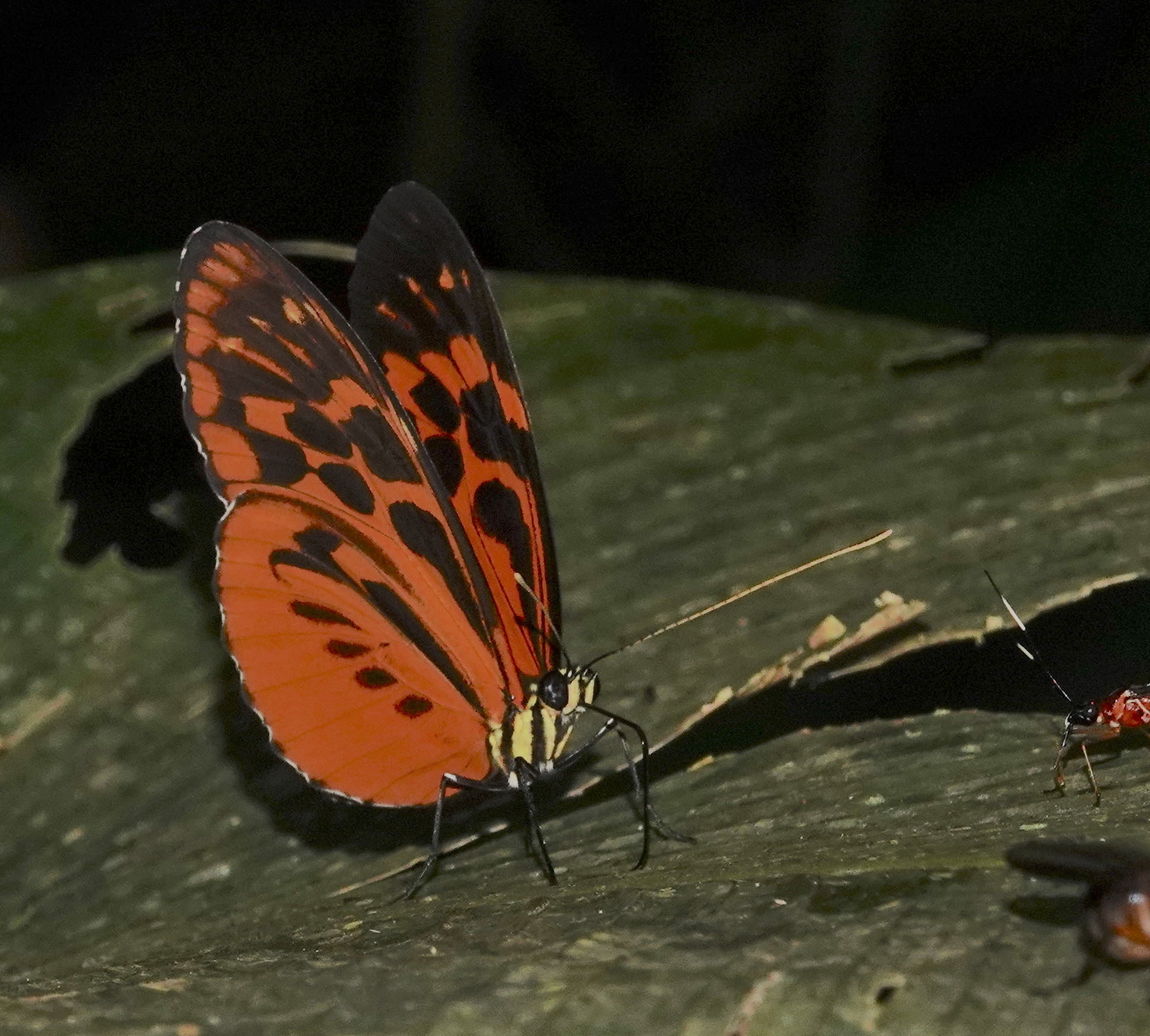
- Heliconius pardalinus maeon in Peru

Scientific classification
- Kingdom: Animalia
- Phylum: Arthropoda
- Class: Insecta
- Order: Lepidoptera
- Family: Nymphalidae
- Genus: Heliconius
- Species: H. pardalinus

Binomial name
- Heliconius pardalinus (Bates, 1862)

= Heliconius pardalinus =

Species of butterfly

Heliconius pardalinus is a butterfly of the family Nymphalidae native to South America.

== Description ==
The yellow eggs are 1.4 mm (0.055 in) long and 0.9 mm (0.035 in) wide. The white caterpillar has black spots. The wingspan of the orange-red wings with brown spots is 90 mm (3.5 in).

== Hybrids ==
Hybridisation of Heliconius pardalinus and Heliconius melpomene resulted in the hybrid speciation of Heliconius elevatus.

== Etymology ==
The specific epithet pardalinus means leopard-spotted.

== Distribution ==
Heliconius pardalinus occurs in Bolivia, Brazil, Peru, Ecuador and Colombia.

== Ecology ==
=== Herbivory ===
Heliconius pardalinus feeds on Passiflora.

=== Habitat ===
It inhabits riparian forests at an elevation of up to 1,200 m (3,900 ft) above sea level.
