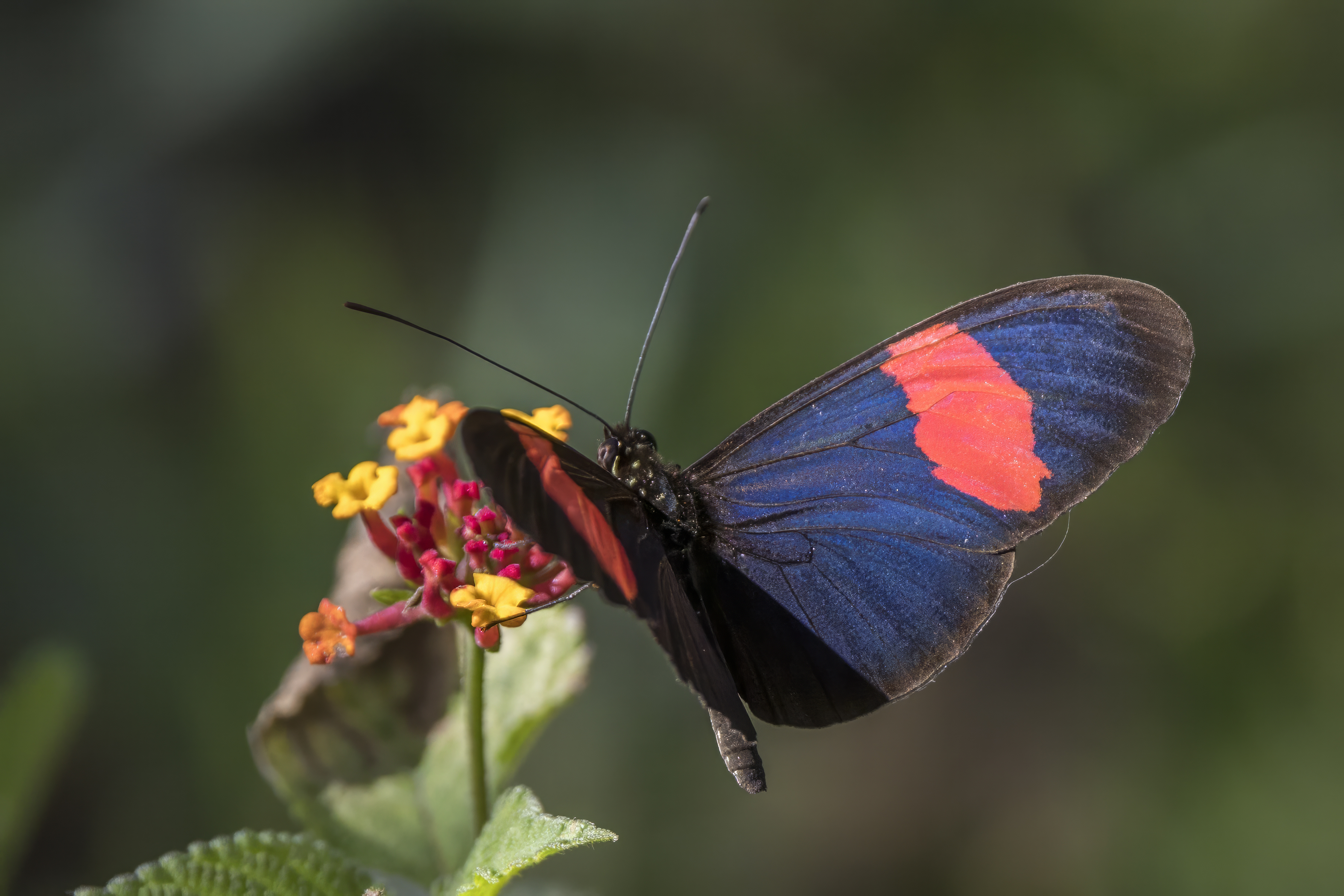
- H.melpomene martinae, Colombia

Scientific classification
- Kingdom: Animalia
- Phylum: Arthropoda
- Clade: Pancrustacea
- Class: Insecta
- Order: Lepidoptera
- Family: Nymphalidae
- Genus: Heliconius
- Species: H. melpomene

Binomial name
- Heliconius melpomene (Linnaeus, 1758)

Subspecies
- Many, see genetics

Synonyms
- Papilio melpomene (Linnaeus, 1758)

= Heliconius melpomene =

Common postman

Species of butterfly

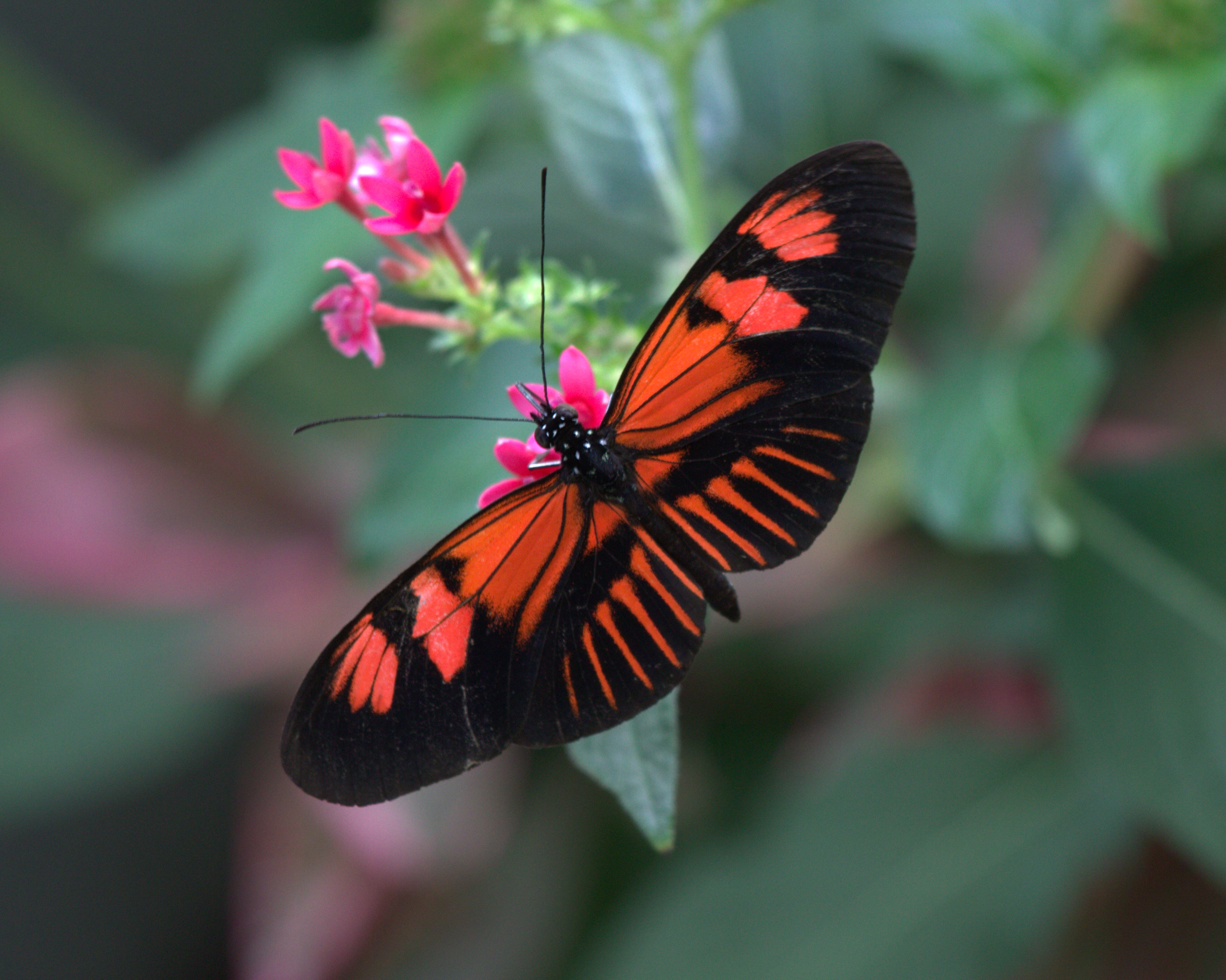
interracial hybrid, probably between H. melpomene malleti and H. melpomene plesseni- dorsal side

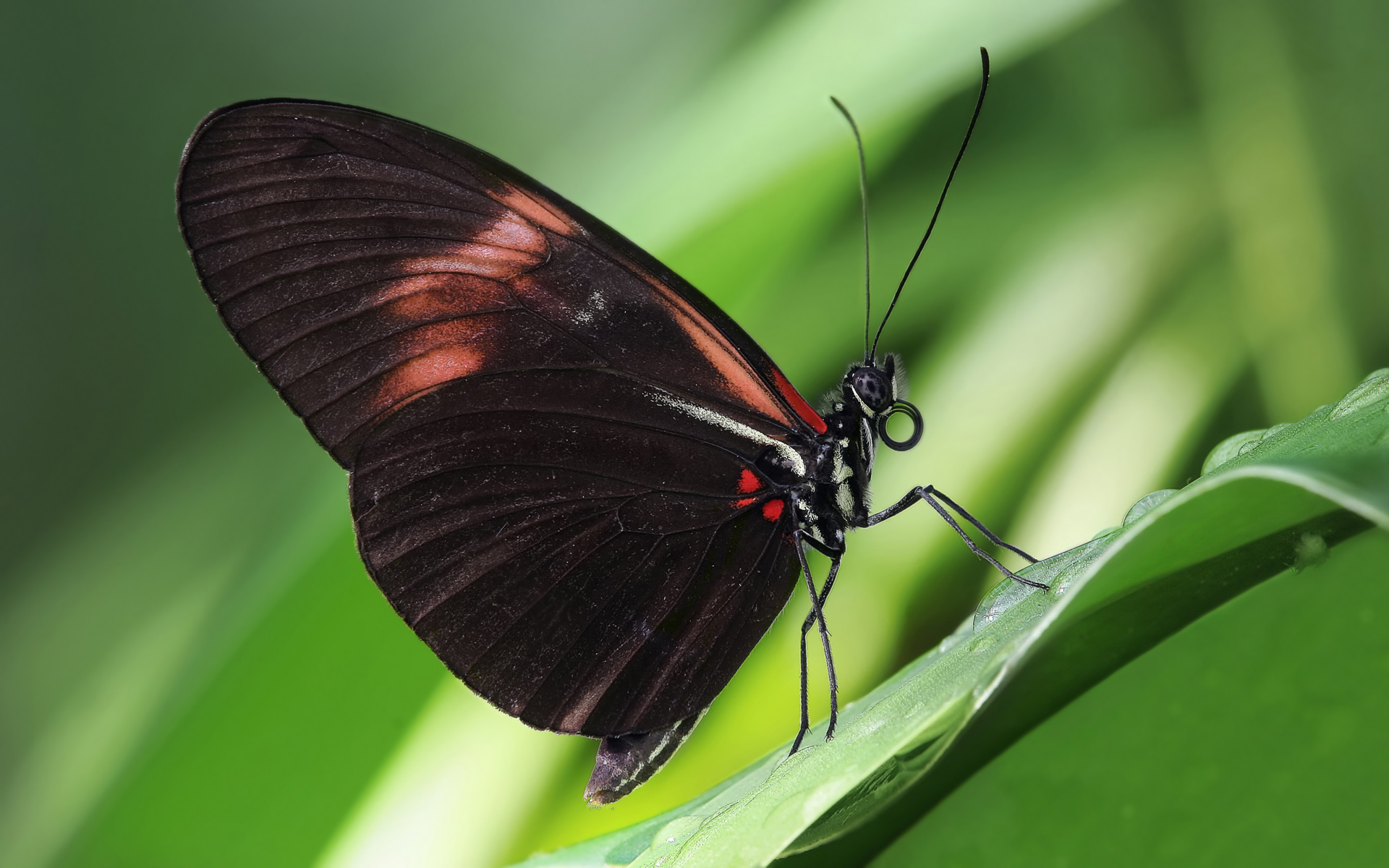
a different hybrid, likely between H. melpomene melpomene and one of the rayed races — ventral view

Heliconius melpomene, the postman butterfly, common postman or simply postman, is a brightly colored, geographically variable butterfly species found throughout Central and South America. It was first described by Carl Linnaeus in his 1758 10th edition of Systema Naturae. Its coloration coevolved with another member of the genus, H. erato, as a warning to predators of its inedibility; this is an example of Müllerian mimicry. H. melpomene was one of the first butterfly species observed to forage for pollen, a behavior that is common in other insect groups but rare in butterflies. Because of the recent rapid evolutionary radiation of the genus Heliconius and overlapping of its habitat with other related species, H. melpomene has been the subject of extensive study on speciation and hybridization. These hybrids tend to have low fitness as they look different from the original species and no longer exhibit Müllerian mimicry.

Heliconius melpomene possesses ultraviolet vision which enhances its ability to distinguish subtle differences between markings on the wings of other butterflies. This allows the butterfly to avoid mating with other species that share the same geographic range.

== Description ==
The postman butterfly is predominately black with either red or yellow bands across the forewings. The postman butterfly has large long wings (35–39 mm). It is poisonous, and the red patterns on its wings are an example of aposematism. They look similar to H. erato. Two features found on the underside of the hind wings help to distinguish H. erato from H. melpomene—H. erato usually has four red dots where the wing attaches to the thorax while H. melpomene usually has three. In Mexico, Central America and the west coast of Colombia and Ecuador, the yellowish-white stripe on the underside reaches the margin of the hindwing in H. erato but ends before reaching the margin in H. melpomene.

There are many geographical races/subspecies/morphs of this butterfly throughout Central and South America. The geographical variation in patterns has been studied using linkage mapping and it has been found that the patterns are associated with a small number of genetic loci called genomic "hotspots". Hotspot loci for color patterning have been found homologous between co-mimics H. erato and H. melpomene, strengthening evidence for parallel evolution between the two species, across morph patterns.

== Geographic range and habitat ==
Heliconius melpomene is found from Central America to South America, especially on the slopes of the Andes mountains. It most commonly inhabits open terrain and forest edges, although it can also be found near the edges of rivers and streams. It shares its range with other Heliconius species, and H. melpomene is usually less abundant than other species.

== Origins ==
A recent study, using amplified fragment length polymorphism (AFLP) and mitochondrial DNA datasets, places the origin of H. melpomene to 2.1 million years ago. H. melpomene shows clustering of AFLPs by geography suggesting that the species originated in eastern South America.

== Food resources ==
=== Caterpillars ===
Caterpillars of Heliconius exhibit a behavior known as monophagy, meaning they feed on only one kind of plant, specifically the genus Passiflora. In H. melpomene, the host plants are limited to Passiflora oerstedii and Passiflora menispermifolia. Species of the genus Passiflora have evolved many chemical defenses, but Heliconius caterpillars have developed adaptations that allow them to continue to feed on the plants and actually incorporate the toxic compounds into their systems and make them unpalatable to predators. These interactions make Heliconius and Passiflora a model system for studies of coevolution.

=== Adults ===
==== Diet ====
Unlike most other butterflies, several Heliconius species have been observed eating pollen as well as nectar. The exact mechanism by which the butterfly digests the pollen is uncertain; it was originally thought that once the pollen was soaked in nectar after ingestion, it would then be able to be digested by the butterfly. Recently, however, the enzyme protease was discovered in the butterfly's saliva, which implies an adaptation for breaking down pollen. This enzyme was found in higher concentrations in the saliva of female butterflies, likely due to the greater need of nutrition associated with reproduction. These adaptations allow the butterflies to extract important amino acids from the pollen, which, in addition to general nutrition benefits, allows H. melpomene to have brighter colors and be more distasteful to predators than their non-pollen-foraging counterparts. It is thought that this foraging adaptation and subsequent enhancement of coloration contributed to the speciation of Heliconius.

==== Pollination ====
Pollen is a rarely utilized but efficient protein source for Lepidoptera species. While foraging for pollen, adults accumulate pollen on the end of their proboscis and the grains stay there for long periods of time. These pollen grains are transferred to the stamen of another plant the butterfly visits while foraging. While there are many plants in H. melpomene's range that provide suitable nutrients, only a few of these are visited by the butterfly. This makes the butterfly an efficient pollinator for the flowers it visits as there is a low likelihood of a plant receiving the wrong kind of pollen.

== Parental care ==
By foraging for pollen while developing eggs, female H. melpomene butterflies provide valuable amino acids and proteins to their offspring. This reduces the amount of time that the offspring must spend foraging during the larval stage, and thus decreases the chances of larval predation. While this extra foraging behavior on the part of the female increases her likelihood of being eaten, the warning colors highlighting her distaste protect her from would be predators.

=== Oviposition ===
Female H. melpomene butterflies recognize host plants by identifying the corresponding chemical compound using chemoreceptors located on her forelegs. When searching for a plant, the butterfly will drum her legs on the plant in order to detect the chemical compounds the plant releases. Once she has found the correct host plant, she will lay eggs singly on separate young leaves. Finding the correct host plant is crucial as H. melpomene larvae are adapted to only feed on certain Passiflora plants.

== Life cycle ==
The eggs of H. melpomene are yellow and approximately 1.5 x 1 mm. They are mostly laid singly or rarely in small clusters on the young leaves of Passiflora plants. Caterpillars live in groups of two to three individuals and are white with black spots. Pupae are spiny and dark brown in color. The adults have black bodies with bright yellow or orange patterns on the wings. Female H. melpomene produce oocytes continuously throughout their life; this is due to the high nutrient diet the butterfly obtains from eating pollen. Closely related Heliconius species have been reported to have a maximum life span of six months, and it is likely that H. melpomene lives for a similar length of time.

== Protective coloration and behavior ==
=== Mimicry ===
Heliconius melpomene coevolved with its sister species, H. erato, each developing similar bright color patterns. The H. melpomene patterns correspond to at least 20 of the 27 H. erato subspecies. This coloration warns potential predators that the butterflies are distasteful and should be avoided; this is an example of aposematism. Since both species possess this acrid taste, they display what is known as Müllerian mimicry. Despite their easily confused coloration, these two species are able to exist in the same habitat range because they are reproductively isolated due to adaptations in the eyes of the butterflies that allow for better distinction between individuals.

=== Chemical defense ===
Both males and females release a strong odor detectable even to humans when handled in order to deter predation. Additionally, H. melpomene butterflies render themselves unpalatable to predators such as birds by producing cyanogenic glycosides in both the larval and adult stages. These glycosides are incorporated into the insect's system by feeding on host plants that produce the compounds as a defense against herbivory.

=== Communal roosting ===
Individuals of the genus Heliconius form large communal roosts which they return to each night after foraging. The reason for this behavior was not well characterized until recently when it was determined that the large aggregations of butterflies provided protection from predators. Butterflies fare better in these groups for two reasons. First, the prey dilution effect lowers the likelihood that one particular individual will be eaten because of the large number of other individuals that are in the area. Second, the congregation of the brightly colored individuals is more likely to deter predators by making the warning coloration more prominent.

== Genetics ==
=== Hybridization ===
Due to its overlapping range with many closely related species, H. melpomene sometimes hybridizes in nature despite adaptations meant to counteract this. Females resulting from the cross of H. melpomene and H. cydno are sterile. While hybrid males are not sterile, they exhibit patterns that are intermediate between the crossed species and thus the males are unlikely to be recognized as mates by either species. Furthermore, the patterns on both sexes will be non-mimetic, meaning they will not be recognized by predators as displays of distaste. Therefore, the hybrids resulting from the cross of H. melpomene with other Heliconius species have low fitness and are not likely to persist.

=== Hybrid speciation ===
Hybridisation of Heliconius melpomene with Heliconius pardalinus resulted in the hybrid speciation of Heliconius elevatus.

=== Subspecies ===
Subspecies of H. melpomene include:

- H. m. aglaope (C. & R. Felder, 1862) (Amazonian foothills of Ecuador and Peru)
- H. m. amandus (Grose-Smith & Kirby, 1892) (Bolivia)
- H. m. amaryllis (C. & R. Felder, 1862) (Tarapoto Valley, Peru)
- H. m. cythera (Hewitson, 1869) (western slopes od Ecuador)
- H. m. euryades (Riffarth, 1900) (southeastern Peru)
- H. m. malleti (Lamas, 1988) (western Amazonia)
- H. m. melpomene (Linnaeus, 1758) (northern coast of South America from Panama to the Amazon)
- H. m. meriana (Turner, 1967) (Guianas)
- H. m. nanna (Stichel, 1899) (Atlantic coastal forest of Brazil)
- H. m. penelope (Staudinger, 1894) (Bolivia)
- H. m. plesseni (Riffarth, 1907)(Andean foothills of eastern Ecuador)
- H. m. rosina (Boisduval, 1870) (Central America)
- H. m. thelxiope (Hübner, [1806]) (eastern Brazil, south of the Amazon)
- H. m. vicinus (Ménétriés, 1847) (Rio Negro, Brazil and southern Venezuela)
- H. m. vulcanus (Butler, 1865) (Choco (western slope of Colombia))
- H. m. xenoclea (Hewitson, [1853] (Rio Perene. eastern Peru)

== Mating ==
=== Mate searching ===
When searching for mates, males of H. melpomene exhibit patrolling behavior, which involves searching for potential mates while flying around the range that the species inhabits. This requires the ability to distinguish H. melpomene females from those of other species, a key adaptation of the butterfly.

=== Female/male interactions ===
Male H. melpomene possess abdominal claspers that are used to grasp females for forced copulations. During mating, the male passes nutrients in a spermatophore; the female can use this nuptial gift to nourish the fertilizing eggs inside her. In addition to the spermatophore, males also deliver a pheromone to the female that is an antiaphrodisiac to other males. This increases the likelihood of the male's reproductive success by preventing the female from mating with any other males, which ensures that only the original male's sperm will be used to fertilize the female's eggs.. The pheromone is produced only by males and is secreted to identify themselves to other males, so the antiaphrodisiac works by making the female smell like a male. After a period of time the pheromone wears off and the female is able to mate again, which she will do several times throughout her life.

== Physiology ==
=== Vision ===
Due to a duplication in a gene for UV light detection, H. melpomene individuals are capable of distinguishing between a wider range of yellow shades than other butterfly species. Additionally, when looking for mates, the butterflies distinguish conspecifics from hybrids and heterospecifics by detecting subtle changes in marking patterns on wings. These adaptations allow the butterflies to avoid genetically costly mates, as hybrid females are sterile and hybrid males in this system are less fit due to disruptive sexual selection.

=== Gustation/tasting ===
While both sexes of H. melpomene possess taste receptors on their hindlegs, only the female butterflies have the receptors on the forelegs; this is an example of sexual dimorphism. The taste receptors are used by both sexes in order to find food and mates, but the female also uses the sense to find suitable host plants for her eggs. These taste receptors are highly specialized due to the coevolution with the Passiflora plant.

== Gallery ==
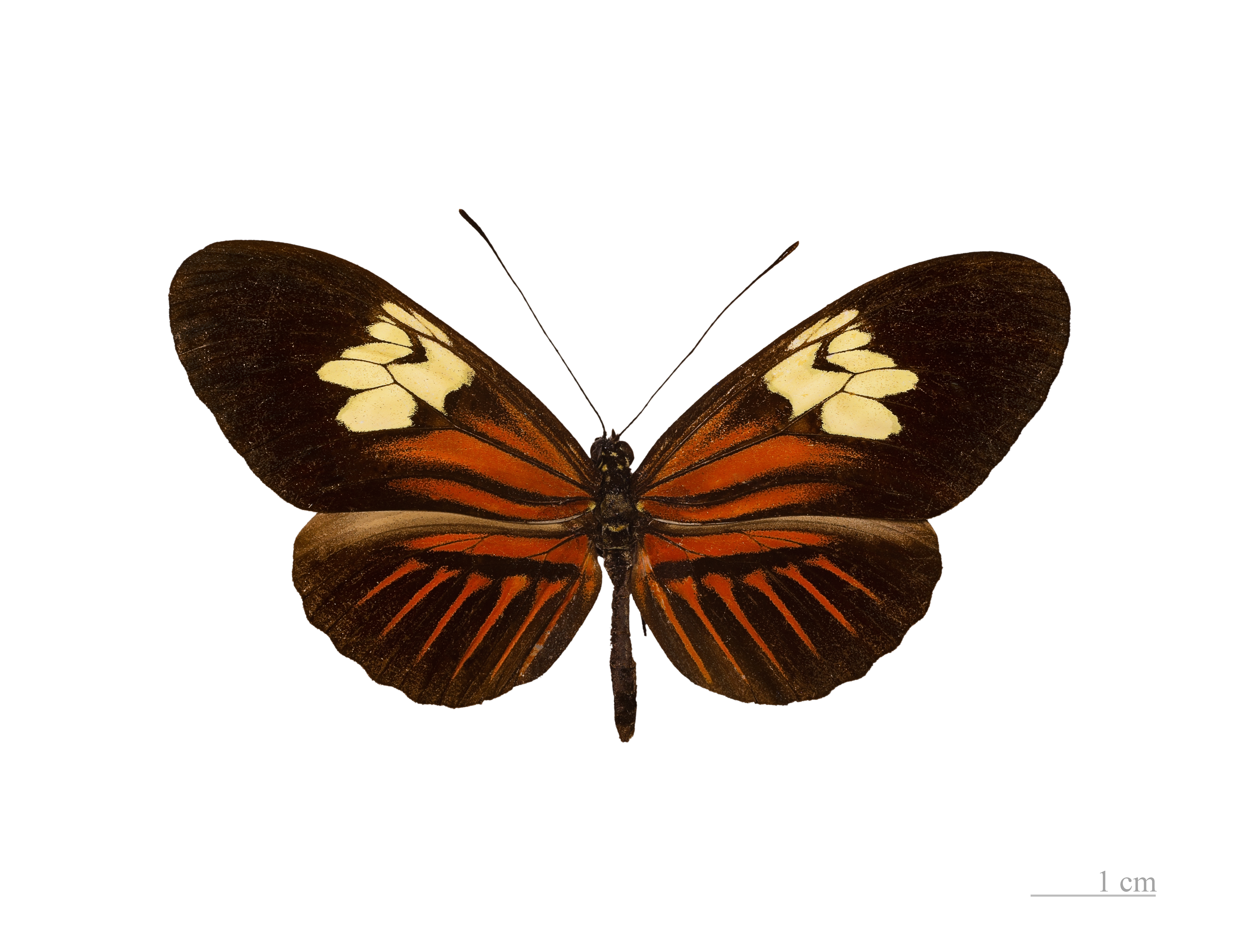
H. m. penelope, male, dorsal

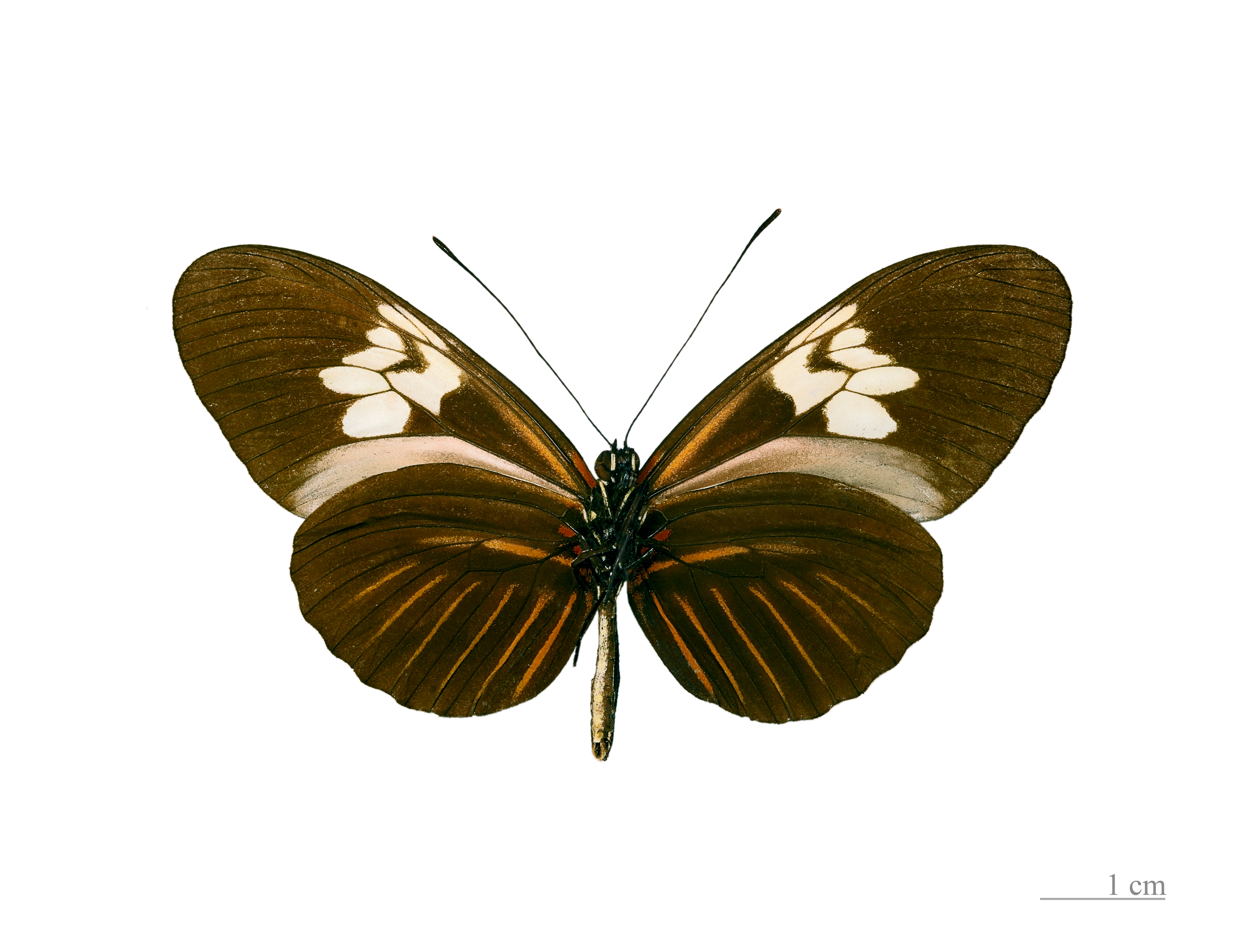
H. m. penelope, male, ventral

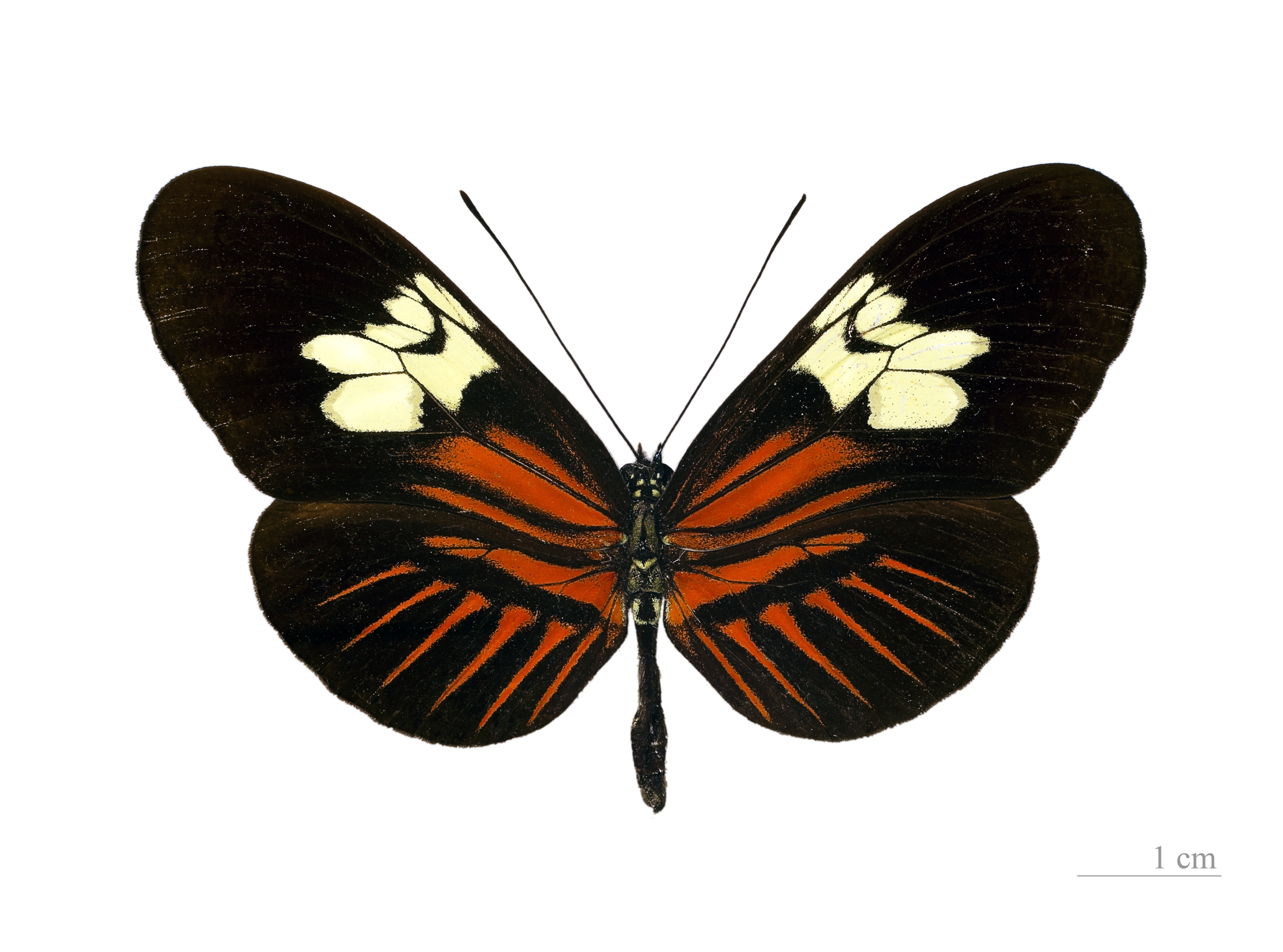
H. m. penelope female, dorsal

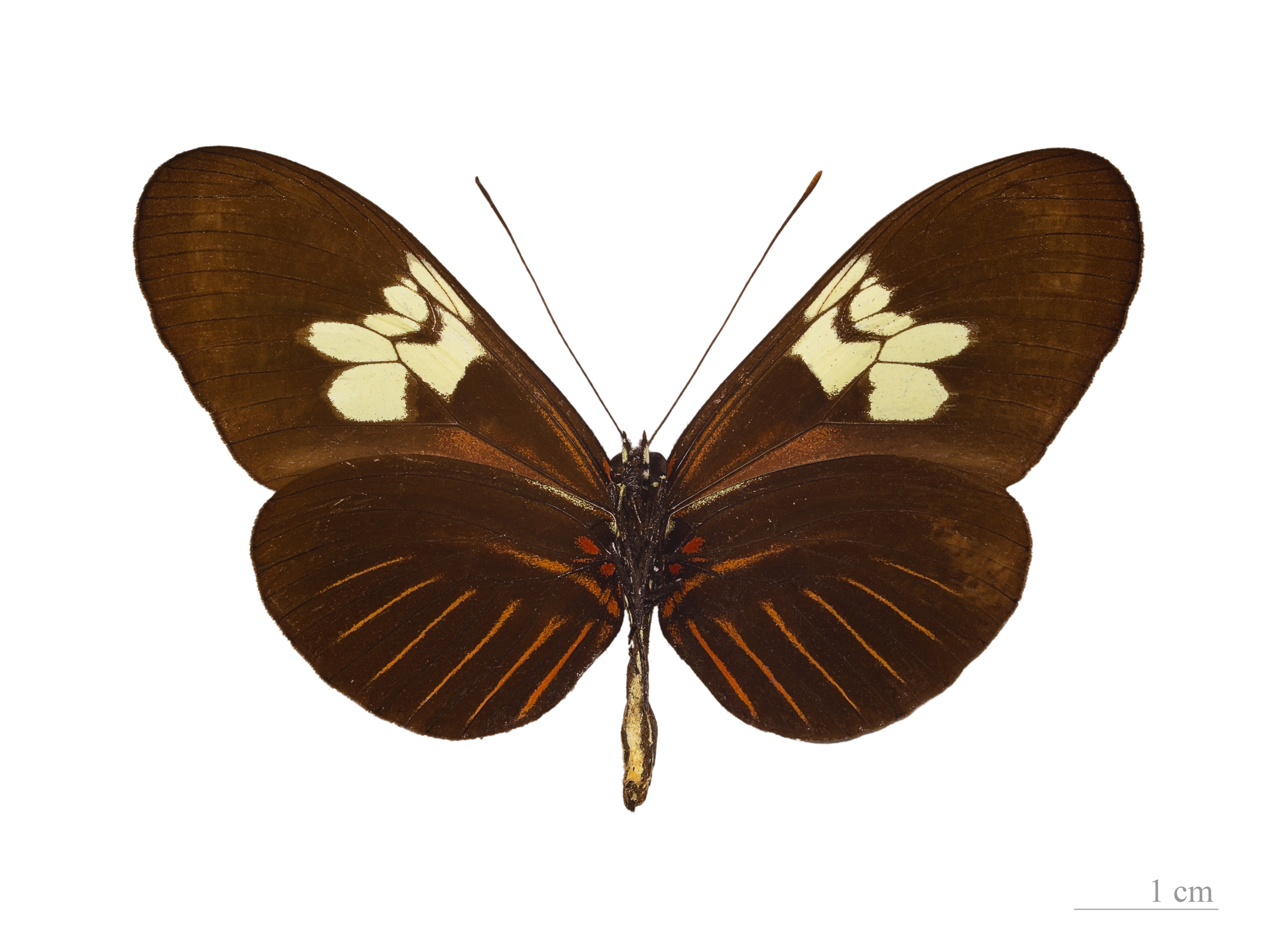
H. m. penelope female, ventral
