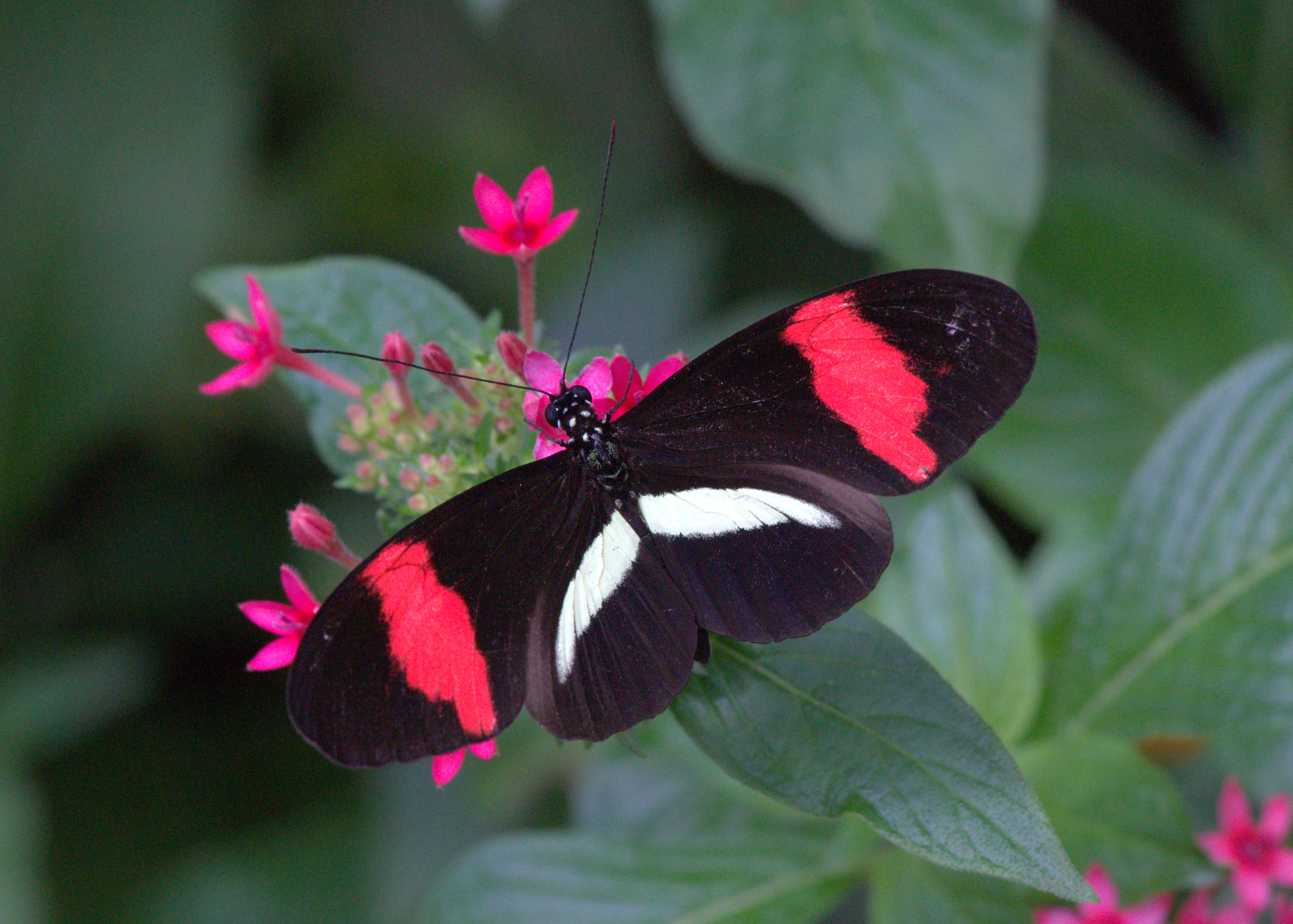
- H. e. petiverana, dorsal view

Scientific classification
- Kingdom: Animalia
- Phylum: Arthropoda
- Class: Insecta
- Order: Lepidoptera
- Family: Nymphalidae
- Genus: Heliconius
- Species: H. erato

Binomial name
- Heliconius erato (Linnaeus, 1758)

Subspecies
- Many, see text

Synonyms
- Papilio erato

= Heliconius erato =

Red postman

Species of butterfly

Heliconius erato, or the red postman, is one of about 40 neotropical species of butterfly belonging to the genus Heliconius. It is also commonly known as the small postman, the red passion flower butterfly, or the crimson-patched longwing. It was described by Carl Linnaeus in his 1758 10th edition of Systema Naturae.

H. erato exhibits Müllerian mimicry with other Heliconius butterflies such as Heliconius melpomene in order to warn common predators against attacking, which contributes to its surprising longevity. It also has a unique mating ritual involving the transfer of anti-aphrodisiacs from males to females. Its host plants are various passion flower (Passiflora) vine species.

Recent field work has confirmed the relative abundance of this butterfly.

== Habitat and home range ==
H. erato is a neotropical species, found from southern Texas to northern Argentina and Paraguay, and resides on the edges of tropical rainforests. It is philopatric, having a particularly restricted home range. In areas of dense population in Trinidad, some home ranges are only separated by 30 yards, but H. erato rarely travels to neighboring home ranges.

== Food resources ==
=== Caterpillars ===
Larvae feed on the host plant, first consuming the terminal bud. After they have exhausted the resources of the plant they have hatched on, later instars may move to another plant.

=== Adults ===
H. erato is a pollen-feeding species, collecting from the Lantana camara flower. They do not spend much time or energy collecting nectar (only remaining for a few seconds). Instead, they collect pollen in a mass on the ventral side of their proboscis. They then agitate the pollen by coiling and uncoiling their proboscis in order to release its nutrients. H. erato is then able to extract nitrogenous compounds in a clear liquid, including amino acids like arginine, leucine, lysine, valine, proline, histidine, isoleucine, methionine, phenylalanine, threonine, and tryptophan. Females typically carry larger loads of pollen than males as females require more amino acids for egg production.

=== Co-evolution between Heliconius erato and host plants ===
Previous studies have shown that host plants, such as Passiflora, have coevolved with Heliconius butterflies. Passiflora plants are usually found in low densities with even less plants in fruiting or flower conditions due to caterpillar feeding. To increase chances of survival and cross-pollination, Passiflora plants synthesize toxins in leaves to deter Heliconius. Passiflora species produce different toxins, leading to different preferences for oviposition among Heliconius species. This leads to a lower chance of herbivore damage for individual Passiflora species and thus helps protect Passiflora plants. Chemical composition of toxins in such plants have not been studied widely. Studies have identified cyanogenic glycosides and alkaloids as potential chemicals that drive distasteful reactions among Heliconius. Toxin variation among Passiflora is one of the reasons for host specificity among Heliconius butterflies.

Studies have shown that H. erato species that feed on specific Passiflora species tend to spend more time on the host plant and are thus exposed to the toxins for a longer period. Accumulation of toxins such as cyanogenic glycosides leads to a low survival rate among H. erato larvae. Increasing exposure to parasitoids due to longer time spent on the host plant also contributes to the high mortality rate. One recent study showed that mortality increased among H. erato larvae which fed on cyanide-releasing Passiflora. Survived butterflies were capable of excreting higher levels of cyanides, suggesting a defense mechanism in H. erato. H. erato species with more mechanisms to detoxify and secrete ingested toxins are the result of genetic differences among H. erato subspecies. Toxin excretion, from previous studies, results in changes in wing pattern and body size. Consequences include decreased fecundity, egg size, and survival rate.

Nectar excretion from Passiflora has also been studied as one factor which contributes to coevolution. Passiflora nectar is known to produce aggressive behaviors among ants, wasps, and egg parasitoids. Ehrlich and Gilbert have estimated that parasitoids are capable of destroying most Heliconius eggs under nectar influence. Therefore, host plants such as Passiflora are believed to have self-defense mechanisms that utilize predators against Heliconius butterflies.

== Parental care ==
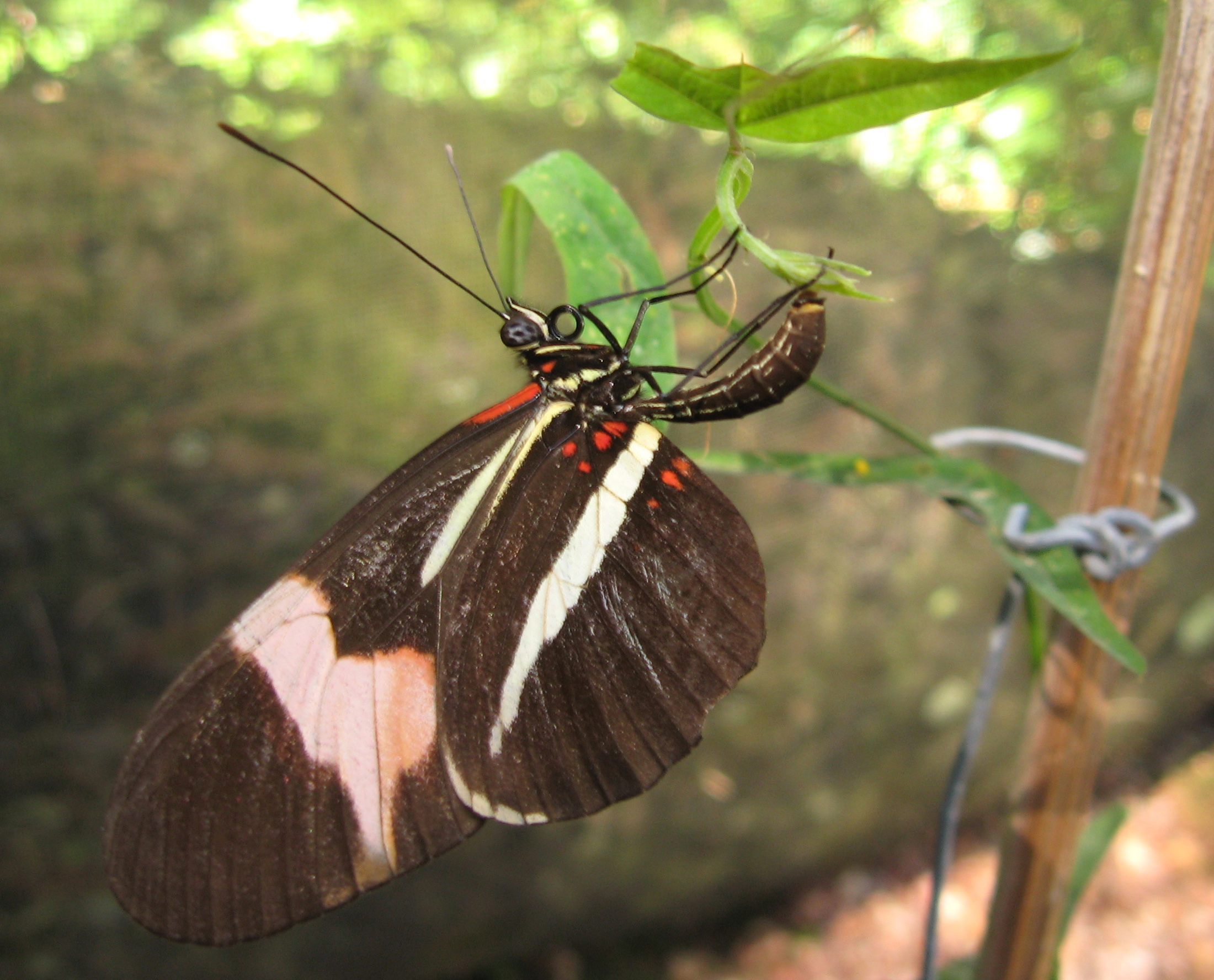
Female H. erato phyllis ovipositing

=== Oviposition ===
H. erato subspecies have innate, localized host plant preferences for oviposition. These predilections do not vary based on one's own larval host plant or with experimental conditioning. Adult females have been observed to oviposit on the meristem of their host species. Individual plant choice is based on internode length, terminal bud presence, shoot size, and leaf area, in order to confer greater larval survival advantage. In H. erato phyllis, plant choice is contingent upon terminal bud presence and condition. However, selection by quality generally depends on host plant abundance and availability.

=== Host plants ===
Host plants include a wide variety of passion flower (Passiflora) vines, including:

- P. biflora
- P. suberosa
- P. misera (preferred by H. erato phyllis)
- P. capsularis
- P. elegans
- P. actinia
- P. granadilla
  - menispermifoliae
  - setaceae
  - pedatae
  - imbricatae
  - incarnatae
  - simplificoliae
  - lobatae
  - kermesinae
  - tryphostemmatoides
  - psilanthis
  - psudomurucuja
- P. plectostemma
  - auriculata
  - cieca
  - xerogona

== Social behavior ==
The red postman returns to a communal roost every night that contains members of the same species and of other heliconids. The roost is typically situated about 2–10 meters from the ground on twigs and tendrils and is occupied by a small group of butterflies. Adults who have just emerged from the pupa typically roost alone for a few days before roosting with others.

== Life history ==
=== Life cycle ===
The red postman has been observed to live in the wild for at least 20 days. In captivity, they live for more than a month and have been recorded to live up to 186 days. This is significantly longer than other temperate and tropical butterflies, which live for a month at best in captivity. H. erato's longevity can be explained by its benign climate and undoubted unpalatability, as well as the benefits from digesting pollen.

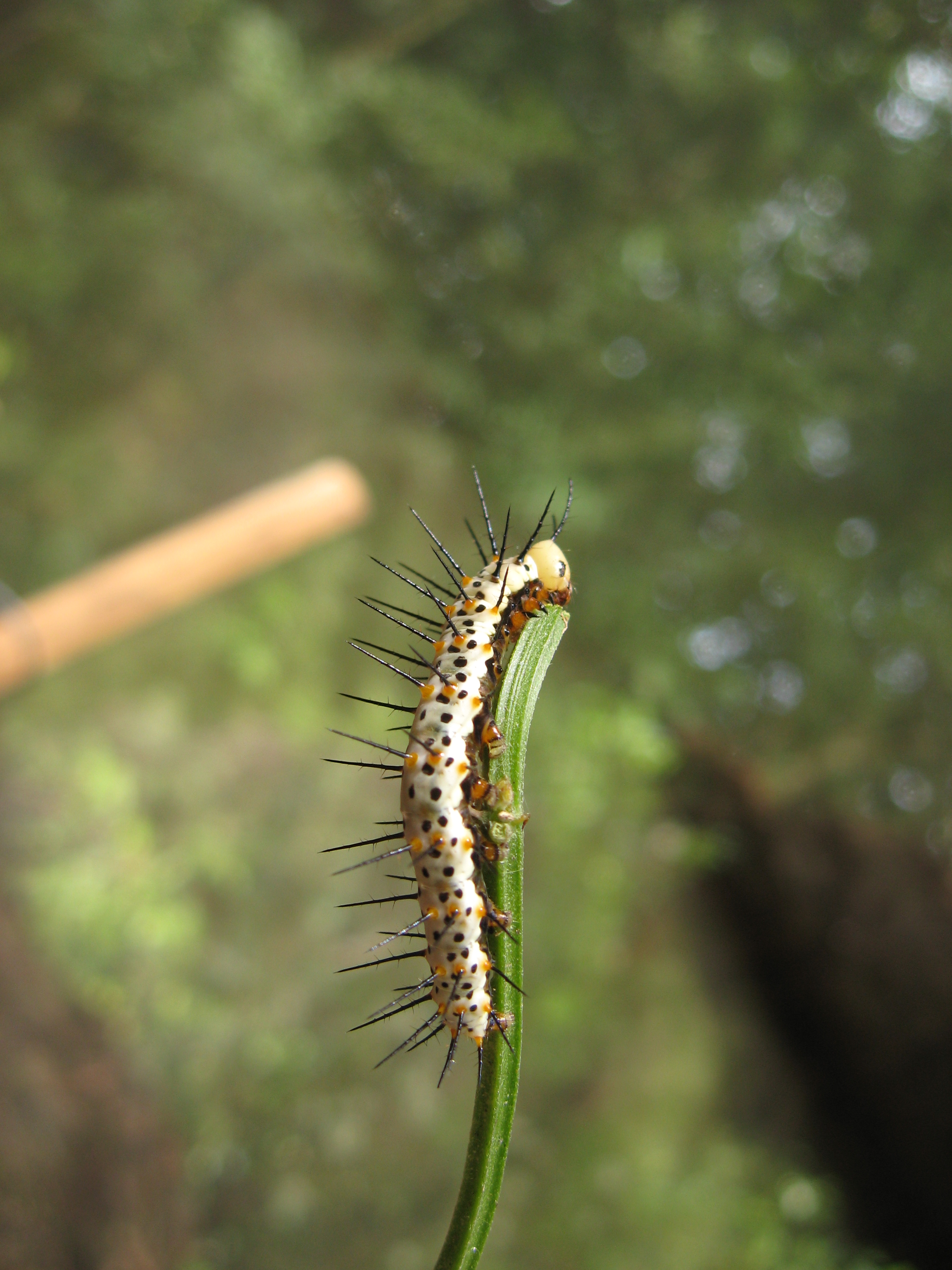
Larva

==== Egg ====
The H. erato female lays one to four yellow eggs a day that average 1.5 mm in height and 0.9 mm in diameter. The eggs have a unique texture, with about 16 vertical and 11 horizontal ridges. Some plants mimic this in order to discourage females from ovipositing on them.

==== Larva ====
The caterpillar appearance is very discrete when young and has a small, dark prothoracic plate. As it matures, its appearance grows more colorful. Caterpillars of H. erato chestertonii have a unique dark stripe on their side. In its fifth instar, it has a white body with black and orange spots, black spikes, and a yellow head.

==== Pupa ====
Pupae reside on the stem of host plants. Heliconius pupae are usually camouflaged and have defensive spikes. Pupae may be light or dark.

==== Imago ====
Adult males have androconial scales on the subcostal region of their hindwings and on their median membrane. Adult wingspans range from about 6.7 to 8.0 cm.

Adults have a variety of phenotypes, all with red coloration. These include: dennis-ray pattern ("dennis" refers to a red patch on the forewing; "ray" refers to red lines on the hindwing); red on the forewing with yellow on the hindwing; yellow on the forewing and red on the hindwing; and white or yellow on the hindwing and forewing. H. erato chestertonii is the only subspecies without any red markings, instead displaying blue.

== Enemies ==
H. erato is preyed on by birds, lizards, monkeys, and mantids, but is relatively safe due to its unpalatability and protective coloration.

== Protective coloration ==
=== Müllerian mimicry ===
H. erato is particularly distasteful to predators. Subspecies have evolved as Müllerian mimics, sharing aposematic patterns with other species in order to deter common predators. They typically co-mimic with other species of Heliconius, most often H. melpomene, which matches with at least 20 of the 27 subspecies. Subspecies have region-specific patterns that correspond to their regional mimics. H. erato chestertonii is unique as it displays blue on its wings while most other subspecies have red markings. It is the only subspecies that lacks a H. melpomene co-mimic: instead, its pattern corresponds with a subspecies of H. cydno, H. cydno gustavi.

Variations from the geographical phenotype of subspecies are penalized by increased predation. In one study, researchers painted H. erato petiverana in Costa Rica to look like H. erato chestertonii from Colombia. These two subspecies successfully warn predators in their own regions with Müllerian patterns with H. melpomene rosina and H. cydno gustavi, respectively. However, the painted H. erato petiverana subjects suffered from increased predation: the H. erato chestertonii phenotype was found to be unfavorable in Costa Rica. This is because their markings did not match the Müllerian pattern of the area, so predators could not recognize their distastefulness.

== Genetics ==
=== Subspecies ===
Listed alphabetically:

- H. e. adana Turner, 1967
- H. e. amalfreda Riffarth, 1901
- H. e. amazona Staudinger, 1897
- H. e. chestertonii Hewitson, 1872
- H. e. colombina Staudinger, 1897
- H. e. cruentus Lamas, 1998
- H. e. cyrbia Godart, 1819
- H. e. demophoon Ménétriés, 1855
- H. e. dignus Stichel, 1923
- H. e. emma Riffarth, 1901
- H. e. erato (Linnaeus, 1758)
- H. e. estrella Bates, 1862
- H. e. etylus Salvin, 1871
- H. e. favorinus Hopffer, 1874
- H. e. fuscombei Lamas, 1976
- H. e. guarica Reakirt, 1868
- H. e. hydara Hewitson, 1867
- H. e. lativitta Butler, 1877
- H. e. lichyi Brown & Fernández, 1985
- H. e. magnifica Riffarth, 1900
- H. e. microclea Kaye, 1907
- H. e. notabilis Salvin & Godman, 1868
- H. e. petiverana Doubleday, 1847
- H. e. phyllis (Fabricius, 1775)
- H. e. reductimacula Bryk, 1953
- H. e. tobagoensis Barcant, 1982
- H. e. venustus Salvin, 1871
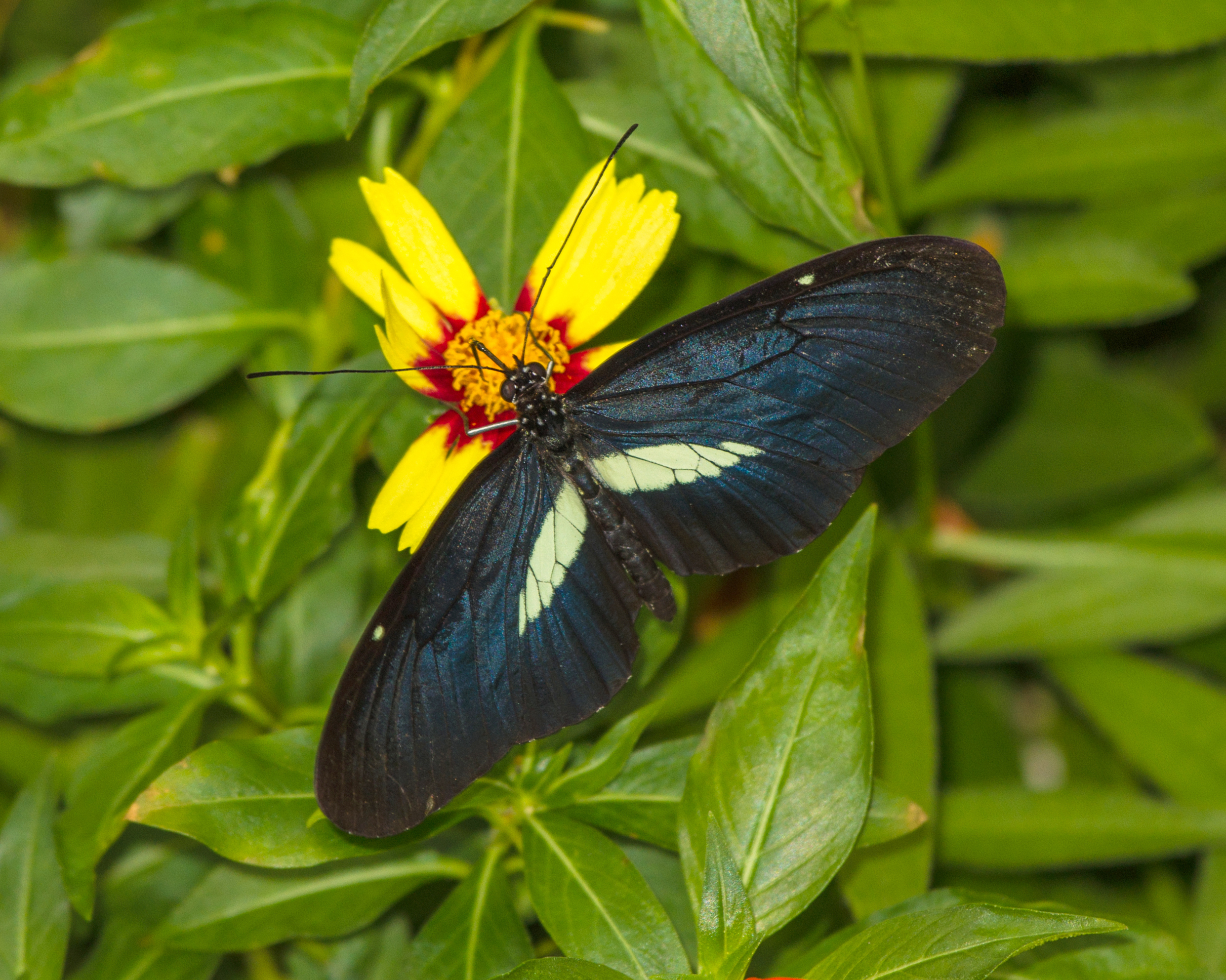
H. e. chestertonii

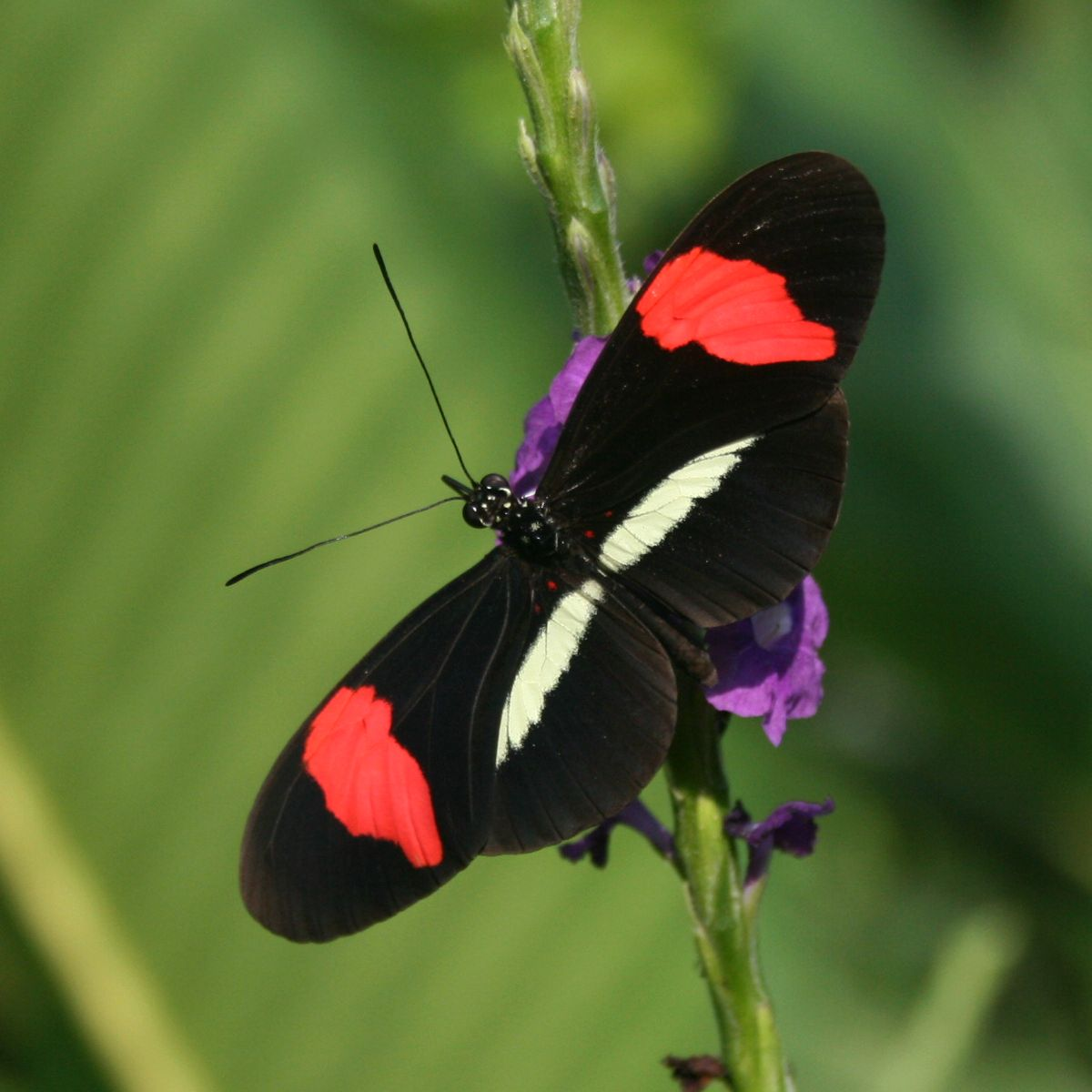
H. e. petiverana
Costa Rica

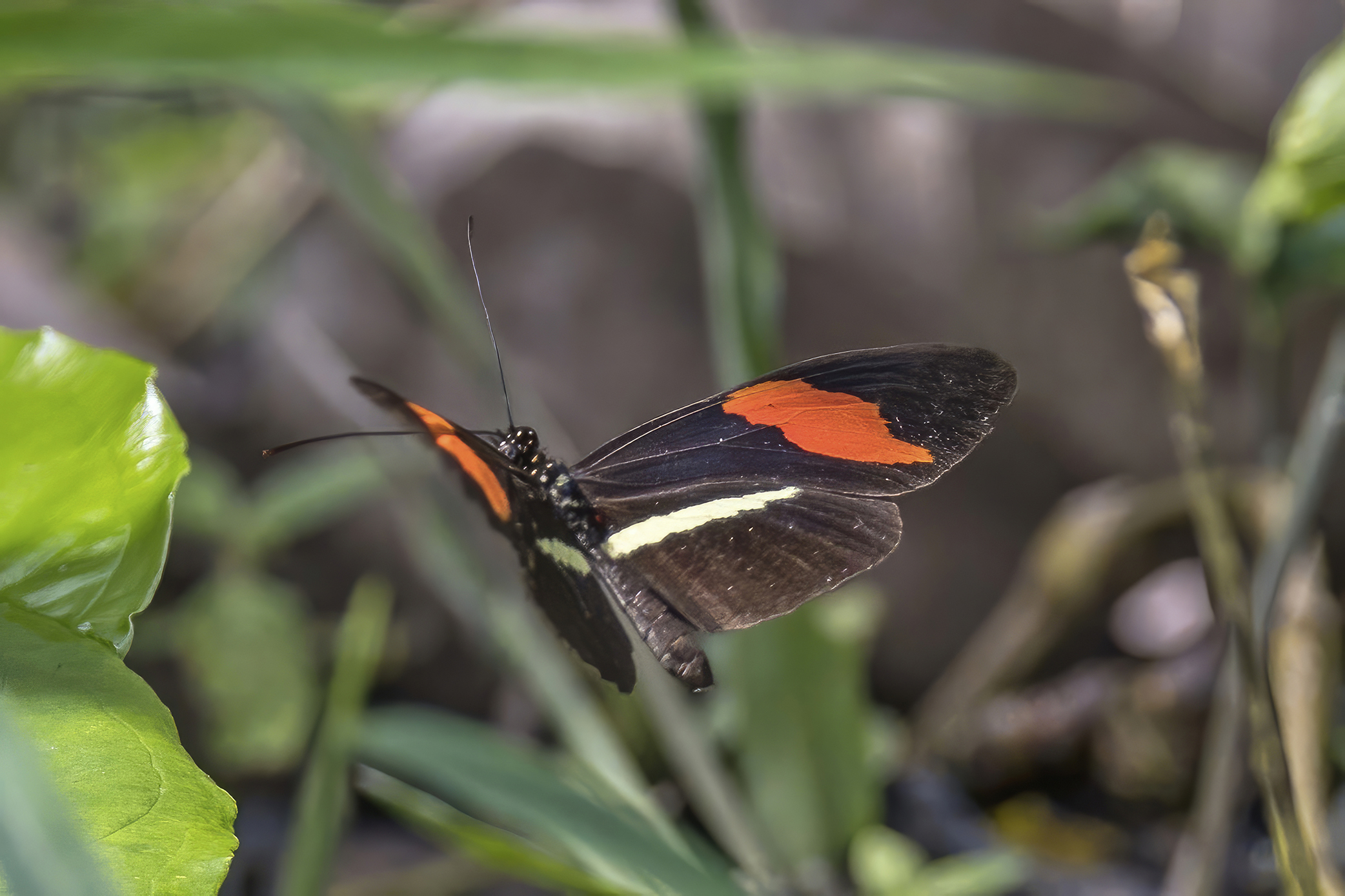
H. e. petiverana in flight, Guatemala

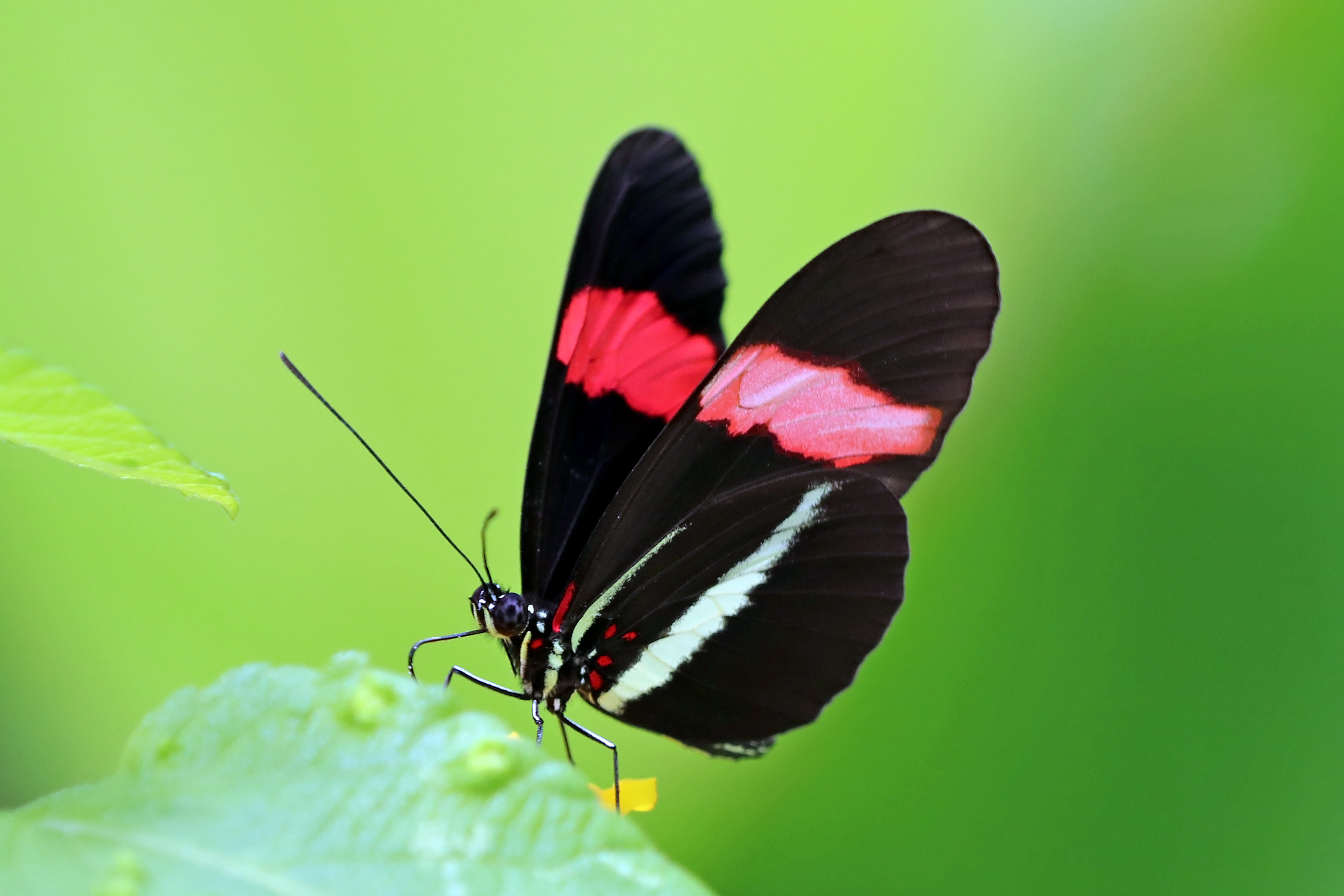
H. e. demophoon
Panama

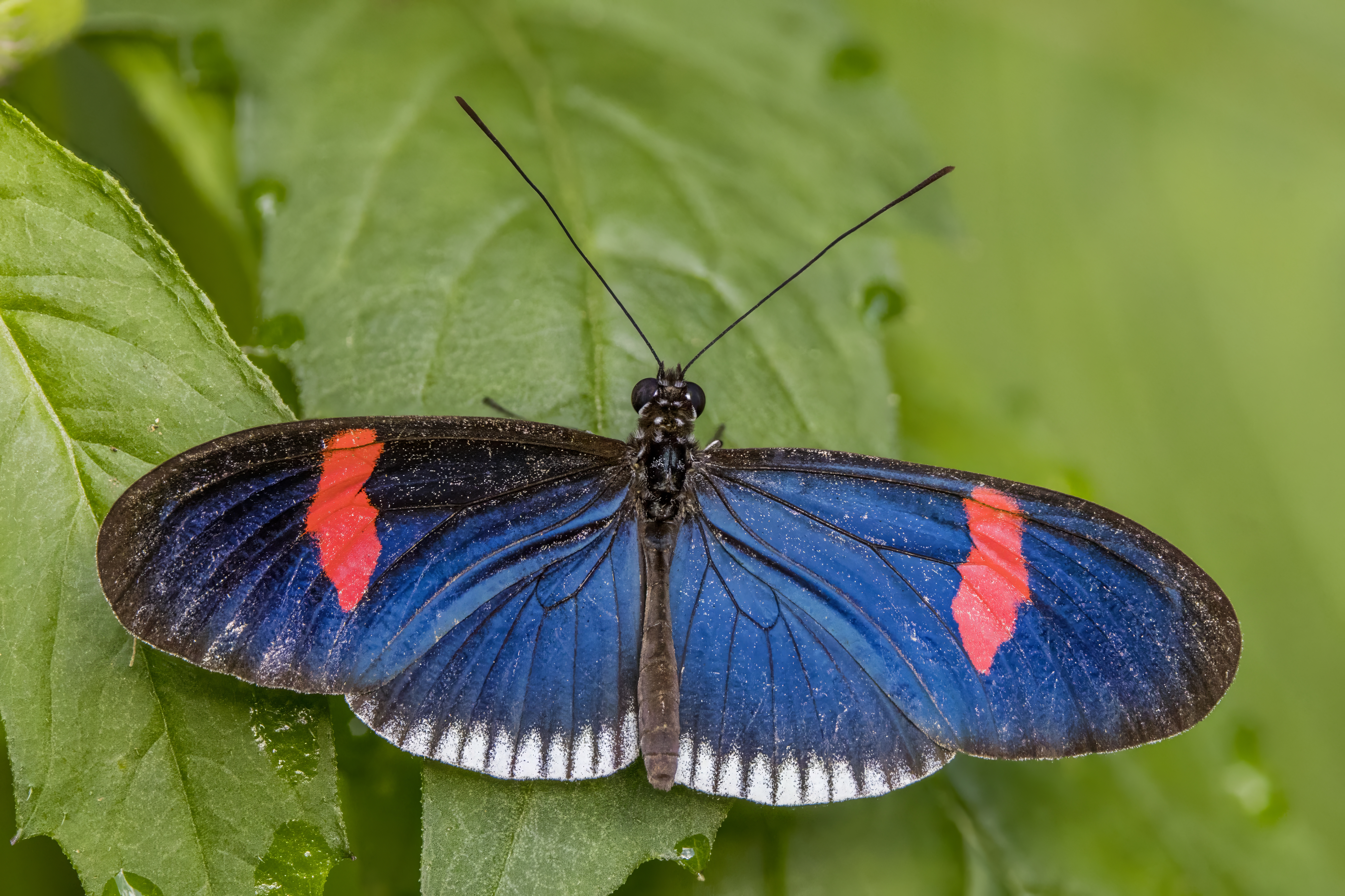
H. e. cyrbia
Cook Islands (introduced as a biocontrol agent for invasive Passiflora)

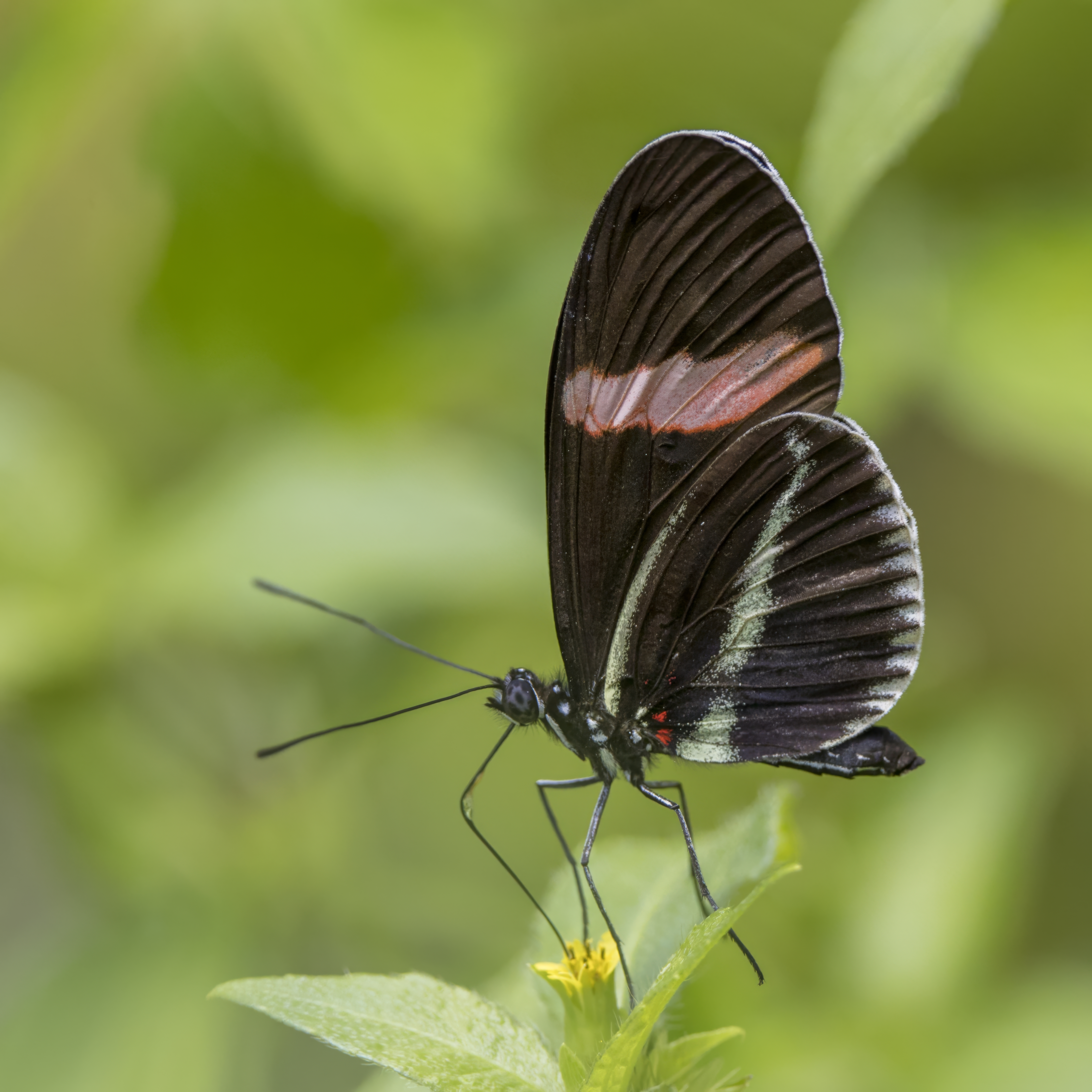
H. e. cyrbia
Cook Islands

== Genetics of color patterns ==
The optix gene encodes the complex red coloration of Heliconius wings. An approximately 50-kb area in the intergenic region near the gene is shared by H. erato and other Heliconius, which contains cis-regulatory elements that control expression of optix.

The clade containing Heliconius erato radiated before Heliconius melpomene, establishing the wing pattern diversity found in both species of butterfly.

A genetic divide exists between the subspecies on either side of the Andes mountains, resulting in two distinct clades. The eastern clade is from Amazonia, southeastern Brazil, and Guiana, and consists of the subspecies dingus, emma, lativitta, phyllis, notabilis, favorinus, erato, hydara, and venustus. The western clade is from Central America and the Pacific slope of South America and consists of petiverana, hydara, venus, guarica, and cyrbia. This distinction is confirmed by sequence divergence: there is more divergence between the clades and less divergence within each clade. In addition, while there are similar haplotypes between the clades, they result in drastically different phenotypes - likely due to changes in genetic pathways for wing pattern during independent evolution. Mitochondrial DNA invariability also suggests recent radiation of these clades, probably within the last 200,000 years. These findings are consistent with the Pleistocene refugia hypothesis: in the late Pleistocene epoch, climate change reduced once widespread habitable forest areas, resulting in allopatric speciation.

== Mating ==
Males scout out females during the day and often mate with females as they emerge from the chrysalis. Many males sit at female pupae waiting for them to emerge and are undisturbed by any commotion. Females mate with only one male at a time and can reproduce throughout life. All subspecies can potentially mate across subspecies, but interspecies offspring are not common. These offspring only survive well in extremely specific hybrid regions and are unsuccessful elsewhere because their unusual recombinant phenotype attracts more predators.

=== Pheromones ===
Adult males have androconial scales which disseminate pheromones to attract mates. Males transfer an anti-aphrodisiac to females during copulation, which repulses and repels other potential mates from the female. It smells similar to phenylcarbylamine, or witch hazel. It emanates from two external protrusions on the abdomen of the female, which are adjacent to yellow glands that are thought to store the pheromone. The pheromone is rarely detected in males as they store it internally. The odor on females can last for weeks, even months, and is advantageous as neither sex wastes time or risks injury in subsequent matings. H. erato chestertonii has an odor distinct from other subspecies. No other Lepidoptera exhibit this behavior.

== Physiology ==
=== Vision ===
H. erato has compound eyes, meaning that each eye consists of many individual photoreceptor units. H. erato eyes are unique in that they have at least five different kinds of photoreceptors and are sexually dimorphic, despite having sexually monomorphic wing patterns. (Butterflies with sexually dimorphic eyes typically have sexually dimorphic wing patterns.) The males lack protein expression of one of the SW (short-wave) opsins, which are light-sensitive proteins found in the retina. The UV discrimination conferred by this missing protein may cause males to mistake female co-mimics of other species. While inefficient, this option may have evolved because it is less costly than producing and using the UV machinery. Females, on the other hand, use this ability discriminate H. erato males from other co-mimics because they eventually invest more into egg production and can only mate with a few males.

== Origins ==
One study used amplified fragment length polymorphism (AFLP) and mitochondrial DNA (mtDNA) data sets to place the origins of H. erato at 2.8 million years ago. H. erato also shows clustering of AFLPs by geography revealing that H. erato originated in western South America.

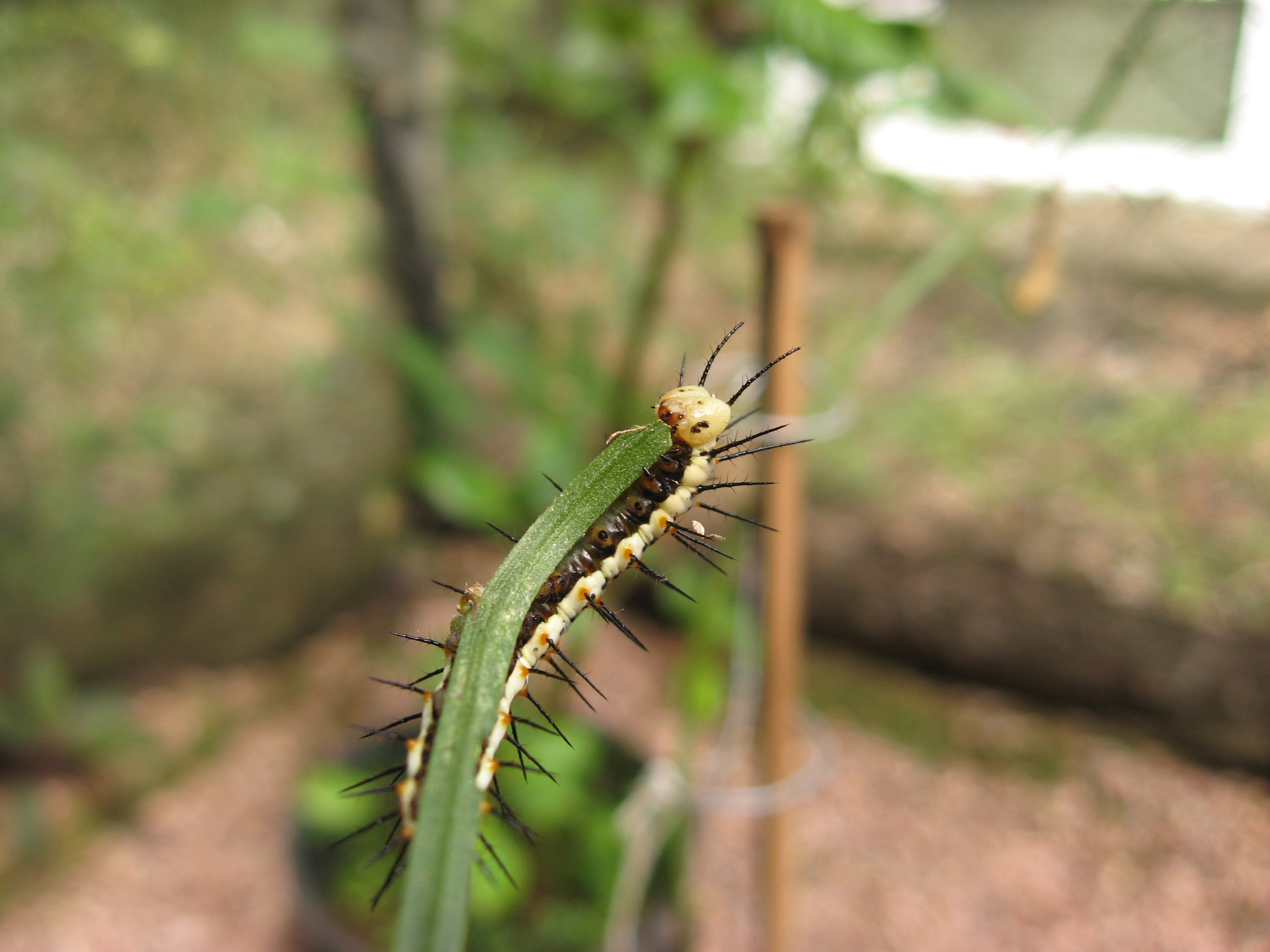
H. erato caterpillar

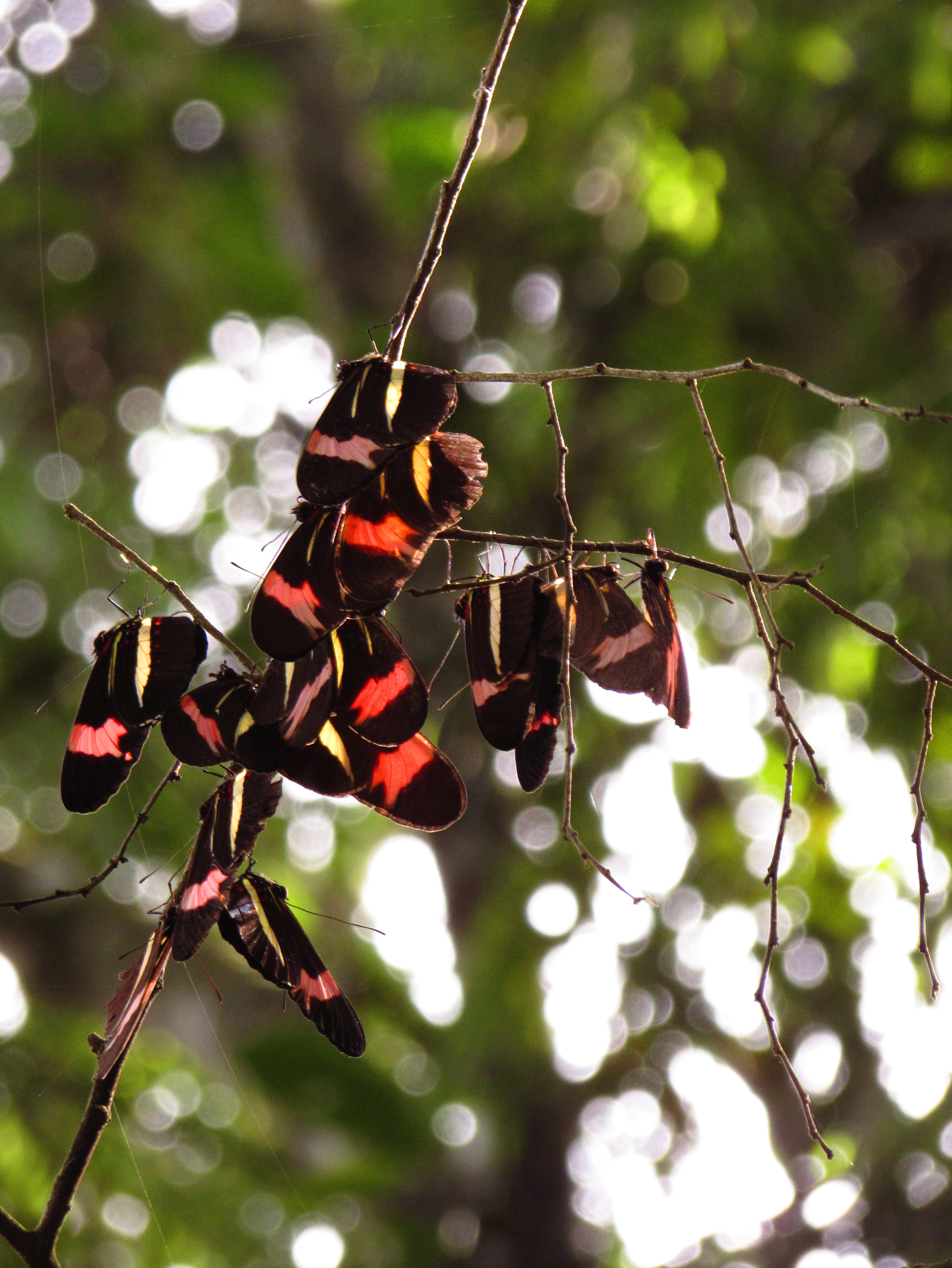
Cluster of H. erato phyllis butterflies

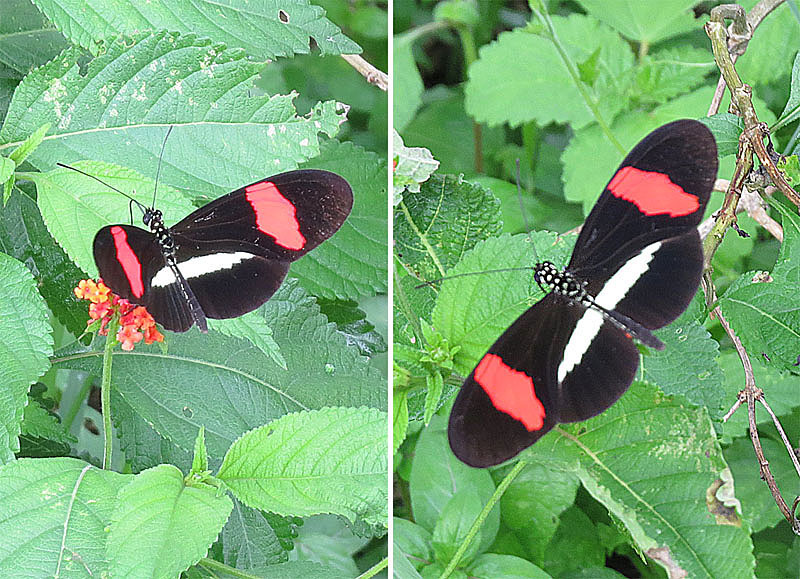
H. erato petiverana

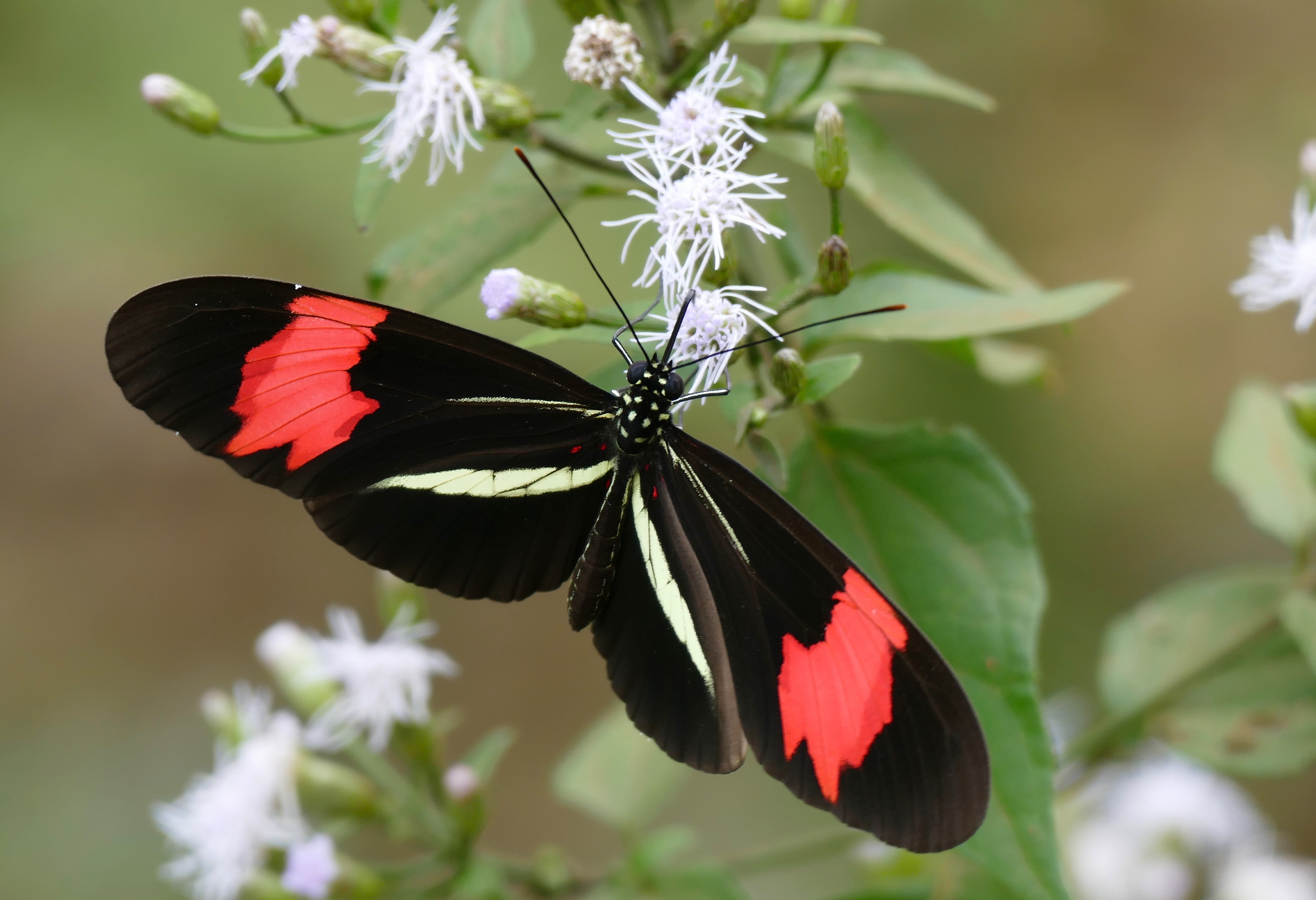
H. erato phyllis
