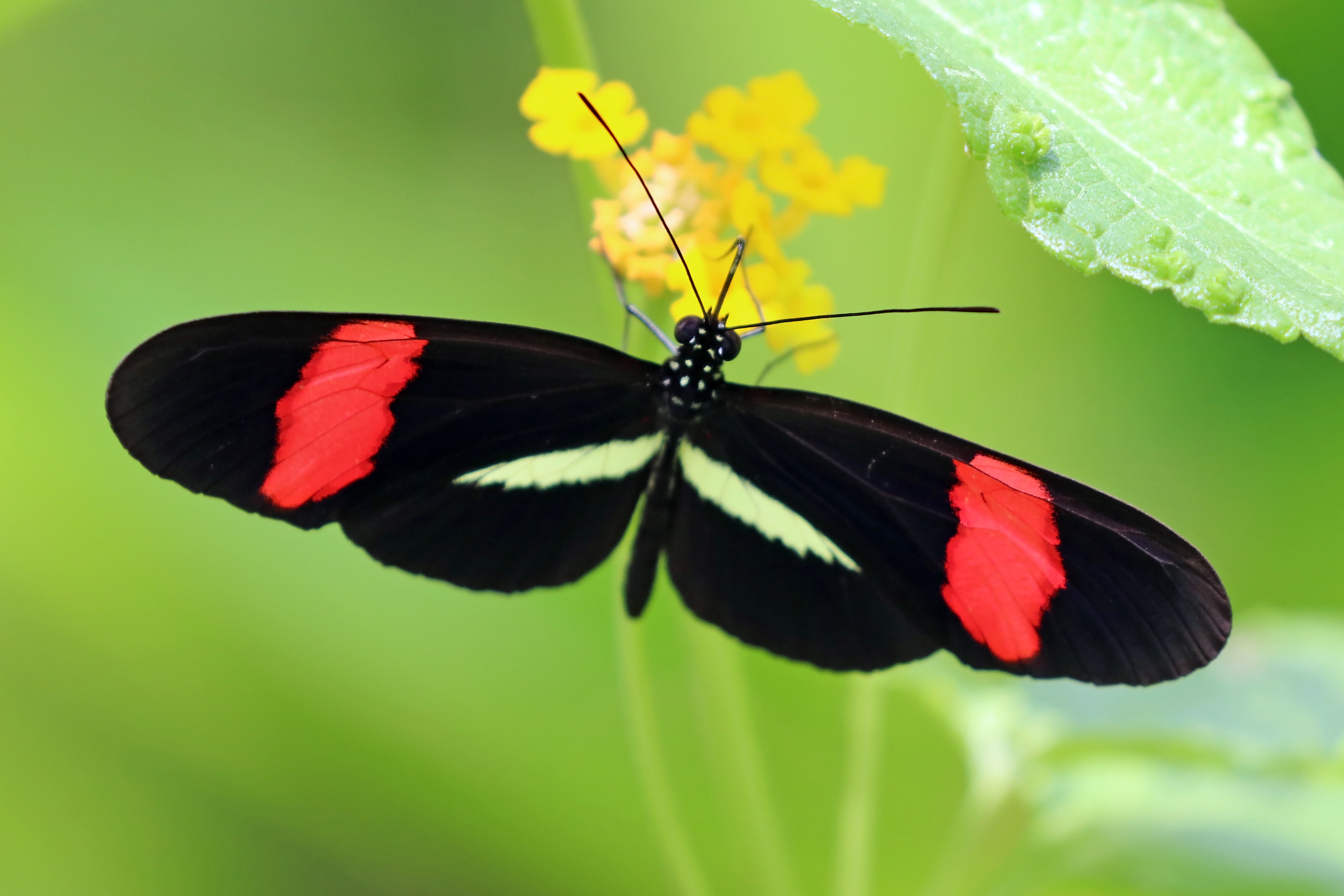

Scientific classification
- Kingdom: Animalia
- Phylum: Arthropoda
- Class: Insecta
- Order: Lepidoptera
- Family: Nymphalidae
- Genus: Heliconius
- Species: H. erato
- Subspecies: H. e. petiverana

Trinomial name
- Heliconius erato petiverana (Doubleday, 1847)

= Heliconius erato petiverana =

Subspecies of butterfly

Heliconius erato petiverana is a subspecies or geographical race of the red postman butterfly. It is commonly known as the crimson-patched longwing. It is characterized by a red forewing patch and a yellow transverse stripe on the hindwing, on an otherwise black or dark brown background. The type locality is "Mexico", and the form occurs from southern Texas (as a rare stray) to central Panama. Some lepidopterists distinguish the named forms H. erato cruentus Lamas, 1998 (from the Pacific coast of Mexico and Guatemala) and H. erato demophoon Menetries, 1855 (from southern Costa Rica to Panama) as separate races, based on the size of the red FW patch and the thickness of the yellow HW stripe.

Identifying comimics

Heliconius erato petiverana is very similar to its congeneric comimic, Heliconius melpomene rosina Boisduval, 1870. The easiest way to distinguish them is by the HW yellow band on the ventral surface, which bends "up" towards the costal margin in H. erato, and "down" towards the HW apex in H. melpomene. On the dorsal surface, two characters of the red FW patch can aid in distinguishing the two species: in H. erato, the distal margin of the red band is relatively sharp, while in H. melpomene, it is "fuzzy", blending with the black scales; also, the lower end of the red FW band does not reach the wing margin, while in H. melpomene it does. These characters should allow identification of well-focused images of the two species to be identified relatively reliably.

These characters are discussed in DeVries, 1987 and also at Cliniquevetodax
