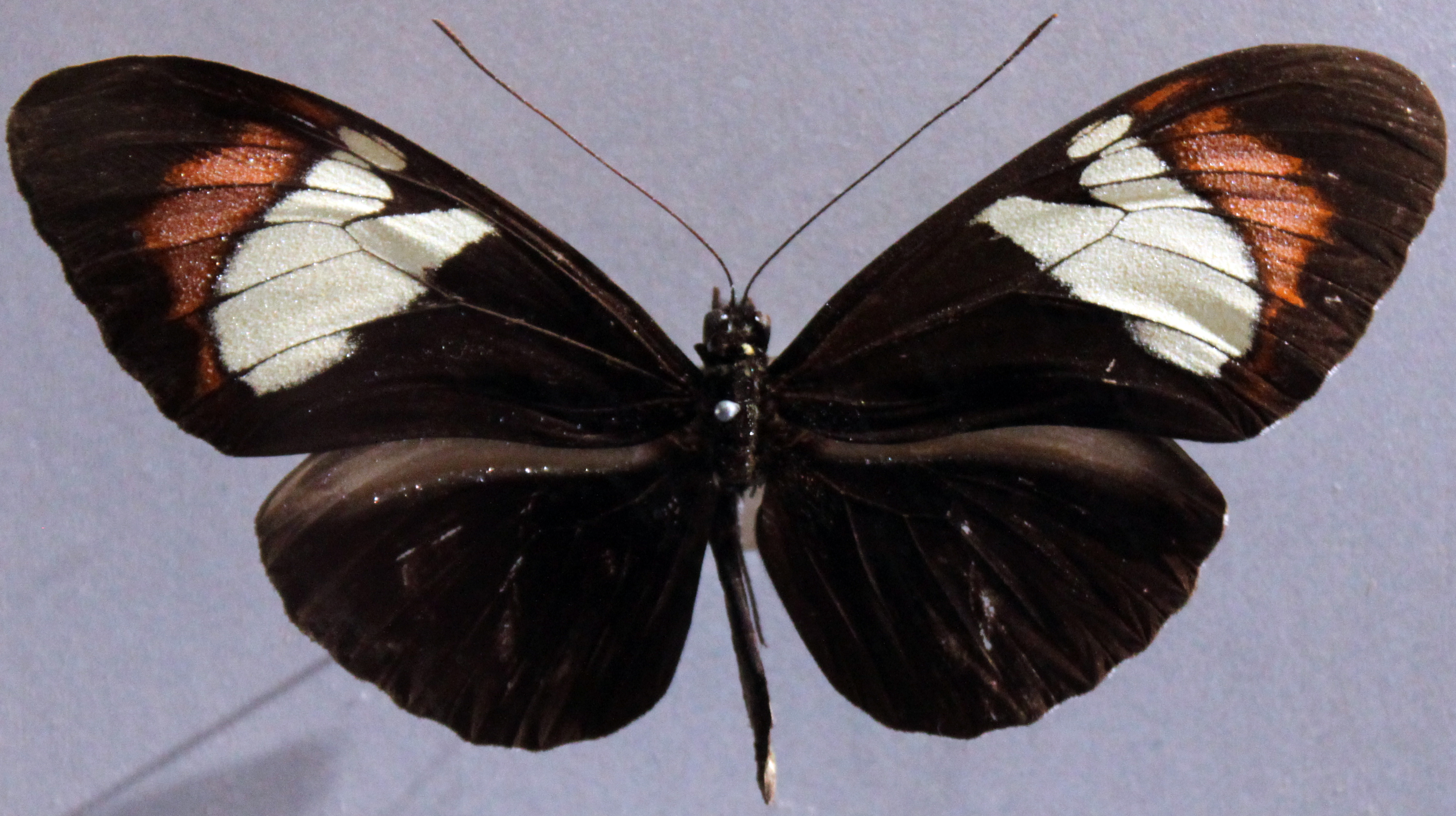
- From Museum für Naturkunde

Scientific classification
- Domain: Eukaryota
- Kingdom: Animalia
- Phylum: Arthropoda
- Class: Insecta
- Order: Lepidoptera
- Family: Nymphalidae
- Genus: Heliconius
- Species: H. heurippa

Binomial name
- Heliconius heurippa (Hewitson, 1854)

= Heliconius heurippa =

Species of butterfly

Heliconius heurippa is a butterfly of the genus Heliconius that is believed by some scientists to be a separate species from—but a hybrid of—the species Heliconius cydno and Heliconius melpomene, making H. heurippa an example of hybrid speciation.

== Range ==
H. heurippa is found on the eastern slopes of the Andes Mountains in Colombia.

== Hybridisation ==
The color pattern of H. heurippa appears to be a combination of the patterns found on H. cydno and H. melpomene. Natural hybrids from San Cristóbal, Táchira, Venezuela, display wing patterns very similar to H. heurippa, supporting the hypothesis of a hybrid origin for the species.

A team from the Smithsonian Tropical Research Institute in Panama attempted to recreate H. heurippa by breeding H. cydno with H. melpomene. In only three generations of hybridization, the investigators developed butterflies with wing patterns almost identical to those of H. heurippa that may be very similar to the first H. heurippa individuals.

Butterflies within Heliconius are "extremely choosey" about finding mates with wing patterns that match their own, and H. heurippa males given a choice between mating with females of H. heurippa, H. cydno, or H. melpomene species were 75 to 90 percent more likely to choose their own kind. They were similarly discriminating when presented with photographs of wing patterns instead of actual mates. The wing patterns of H. heurippa individuals also make them undesirable as mates for members of their parents' species as well, showing evidence for reproductive isolation between H. heurippa and its putative parental species.

Skeptics wish to see further genetic sequencing demonstrating that wild H. heurippa is a hybrid similar to the laboratory-developed animals, and the H. heurippa hybrid speciation hypothesis has been the subject of a recent (2011) critical review. There is evidence to suggest that the genome of H. heurippa may be a mosaic.

The species H. timareta and H. pachinus are also proposed to result from the hybridization of H. cydno and H. melpomene.
