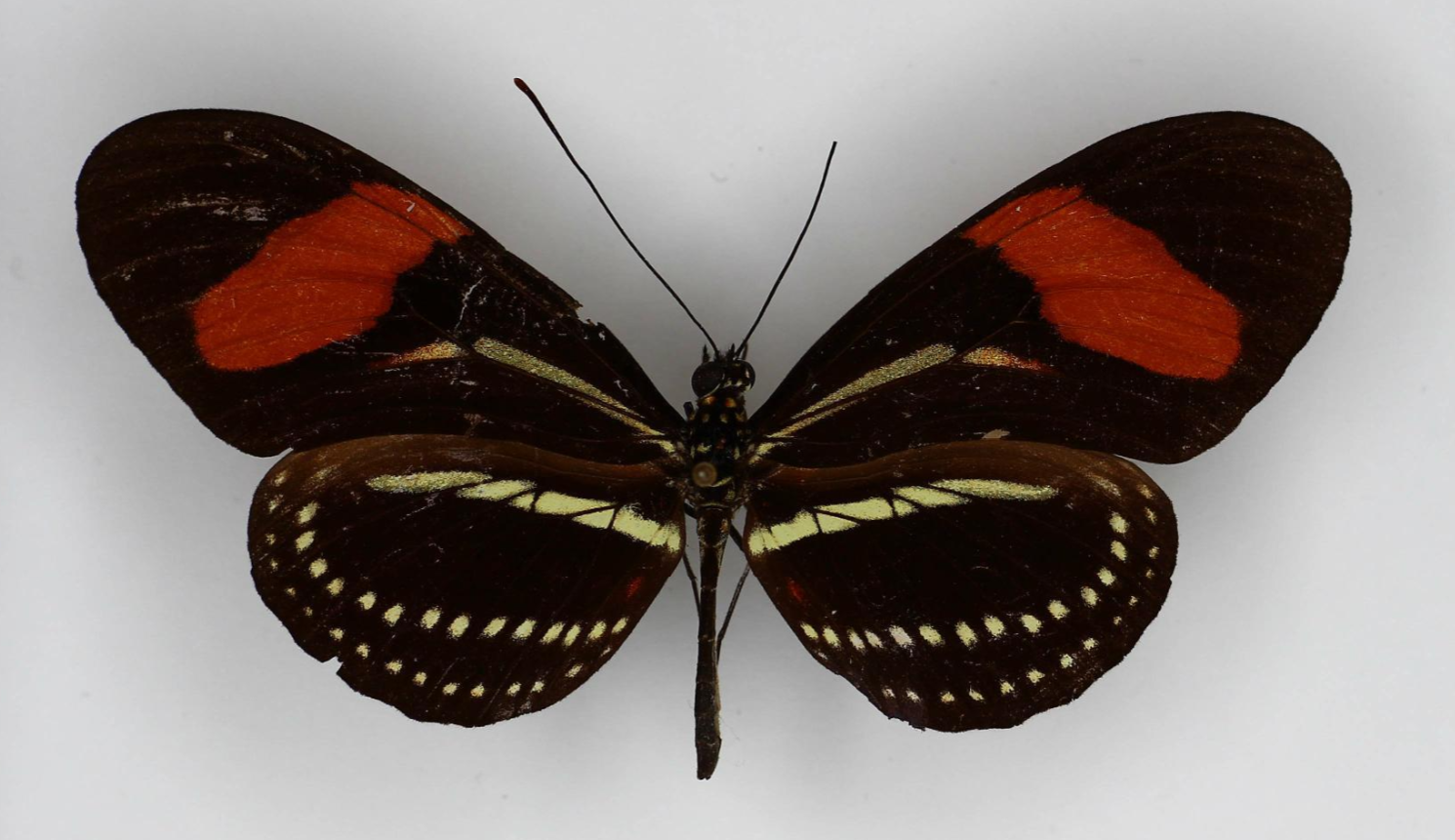
- Upperside
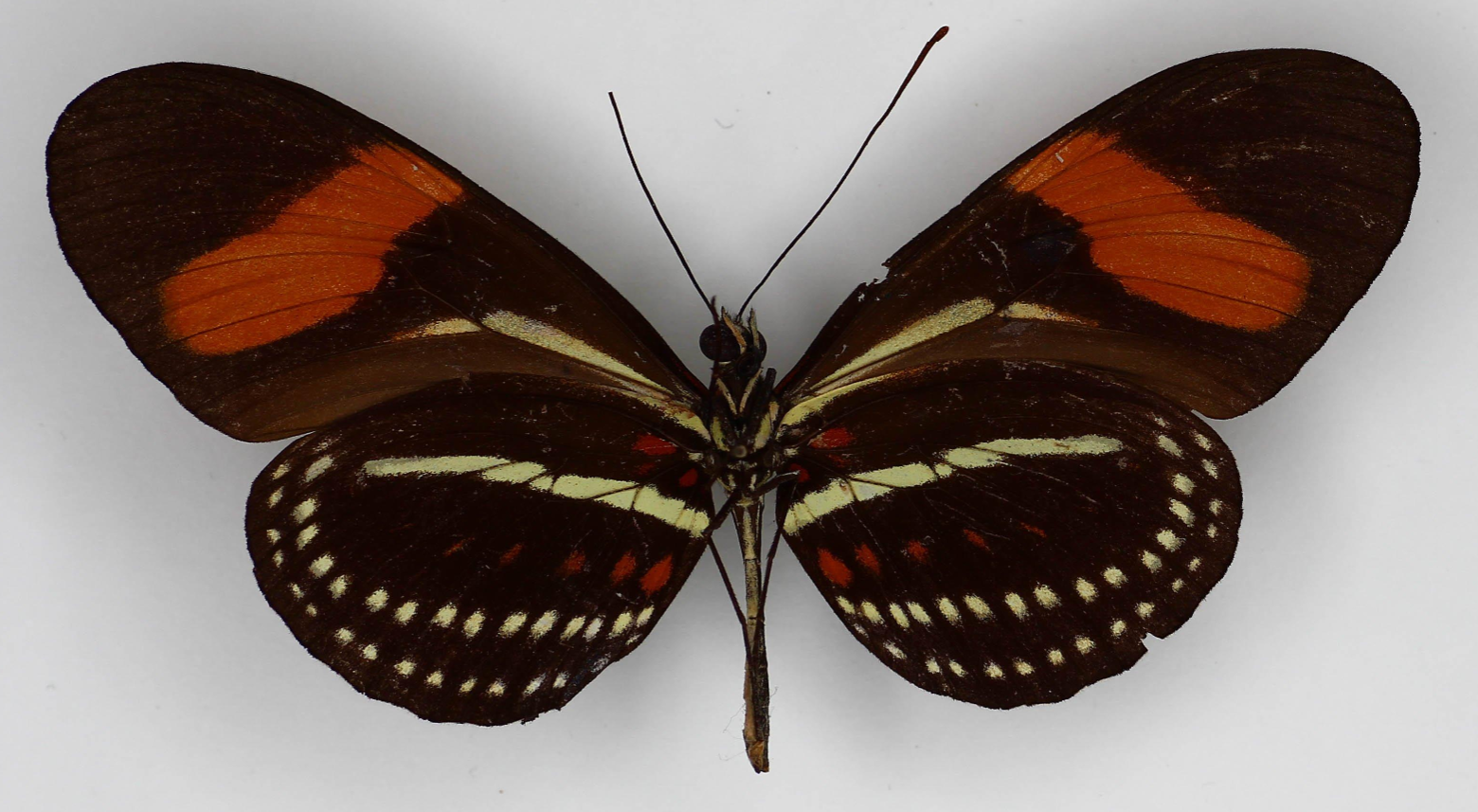
- Underside

Scientific classification
- Kingdom: Animalia
- Phylum: Arthropoda
- Class: Insecta
- Order: Lepidoptera
- Family: Nymphalidae
- Genus: Heliconius
- Species: H. hermathena

Binomial name
- Heliconius hermathena Hewitson, 1854

Synonyms
- Heliconia hermathena Hewitson, 1854; Heliconius hermathena f. hydarina Stichel, 1912; Heliconius hermathena f. rubropunctata D'Abrera, 1984; Heliconius hermathena sheppardorum Lamas, 1988

= Heliconius hermathena =

Species of butterfly

Heliconius hermathena, the Hermathena longwing, is a species of butterfly of the family Nymphalidae. It is endemic to white sand areas of the Amazon basin. Heliconius hermathena is a sand forest nymphalid butterfly and they are typically lowland tropical forest organisms although a handful subspecies can be found in southeastern Brazil and part of the dry forests of Peru.

Heliconius hermathena is distinguished by its red, black, and yellow wing color.

== Biographical History ==
During the Quaternary climatic cycles, resulting forest islands in the American tropics produced a widespread of evolutionary new species and eventually these forests branched out, during wetter periods, to meet with sister zones.

However, as these Neotropical forests reach their peak expansions, natural scrubs and field vegetation declined making them a habitat for high-light, low-humidity, and often harsh conditions.

These conditions gave rise to a variety of new species such as Heliconius hermathena.

== Characteristic ==
They exhibit a non-mimetic pattern because of their strong distinction from other butterflies in the Amazonia or Neotropical areas.

Male butterflies dominate the population and are depicted with greater wing sizes than the females while both sexes display a survivorship curve of Type 2.

The larvae feed primarily on plants of the family Passifloraceae.

== Etymology ==
Hermathena is a herm of Athena, a composite form of the Greek gods Hermes and Athena.

== Subspecies ==
- H. h. hermathena
- H. h. duckei K. Brown & Benson, 1977 (Brazil: Pará)
- H. h. renatae K. Brown & F. Fernández, 1985 (Venezuela)
- H. h. sabinae Neukirchen, 1992 (Brazil: Amazonas)
- H. h. sheppardi K. Brown & Benson, 1977 (Brazil: Amazonas)
- H. h. vereatta Stichel, 1912 (Brazil: Pará)
