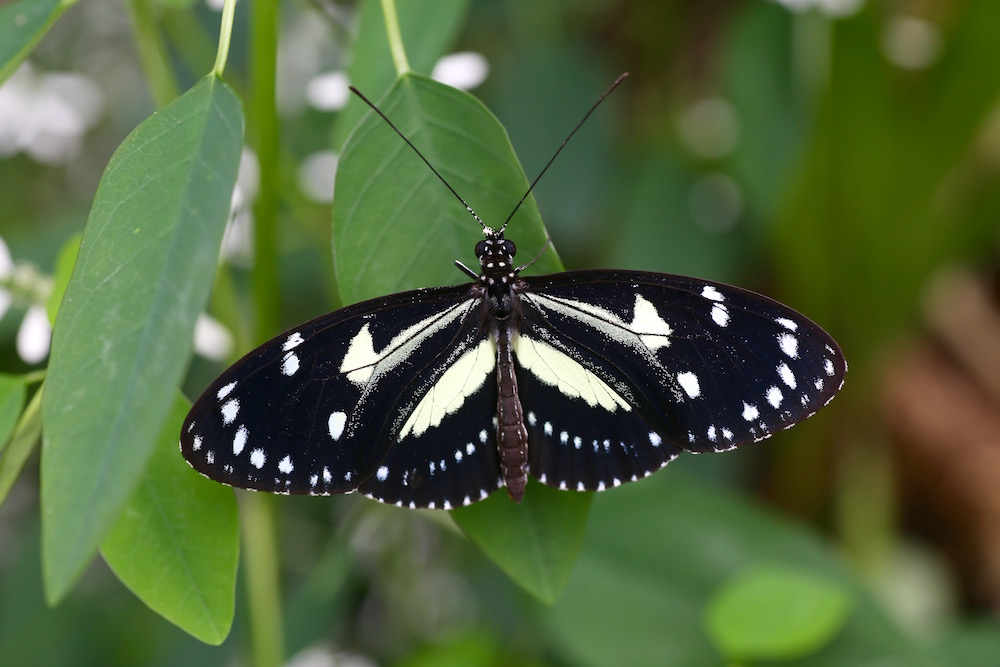
- Dorsal view (from Mindo, Ecuador)
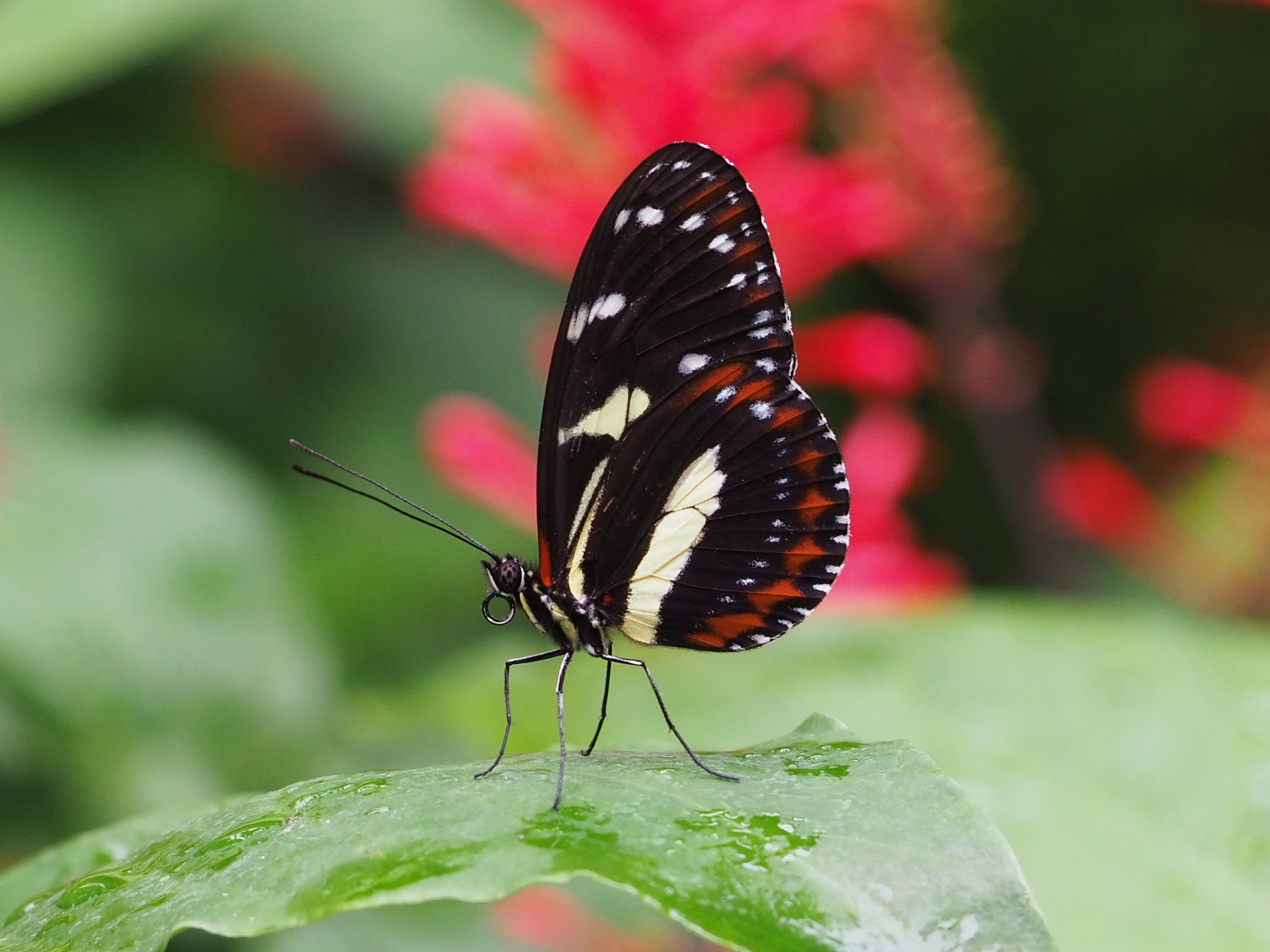
- Ventral view

Scientific classification
- Kingdom: Animalia
- Phylum: Arthropoda
- Class: Insecta
- Order: Lepidoptera
- Family: Nymphalidae
- Genus: Heliconius
- Species: H. atthis

Binomial name
- Heliconius atthis Doubleday, [1847]
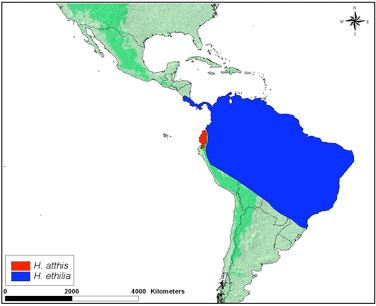
- Range in red

Synonyms
- Heliconia bourcieri Becker, 1851

= Heliconius atthis =

False zebra longwing

Species of butterfly

Heliconius atthis, the false zebra longwing or Atthis longwing, is a species of Heliconius butterfly. It is endemic to western Ecuador and the Tumbes National Reserve in Northern Peru.
