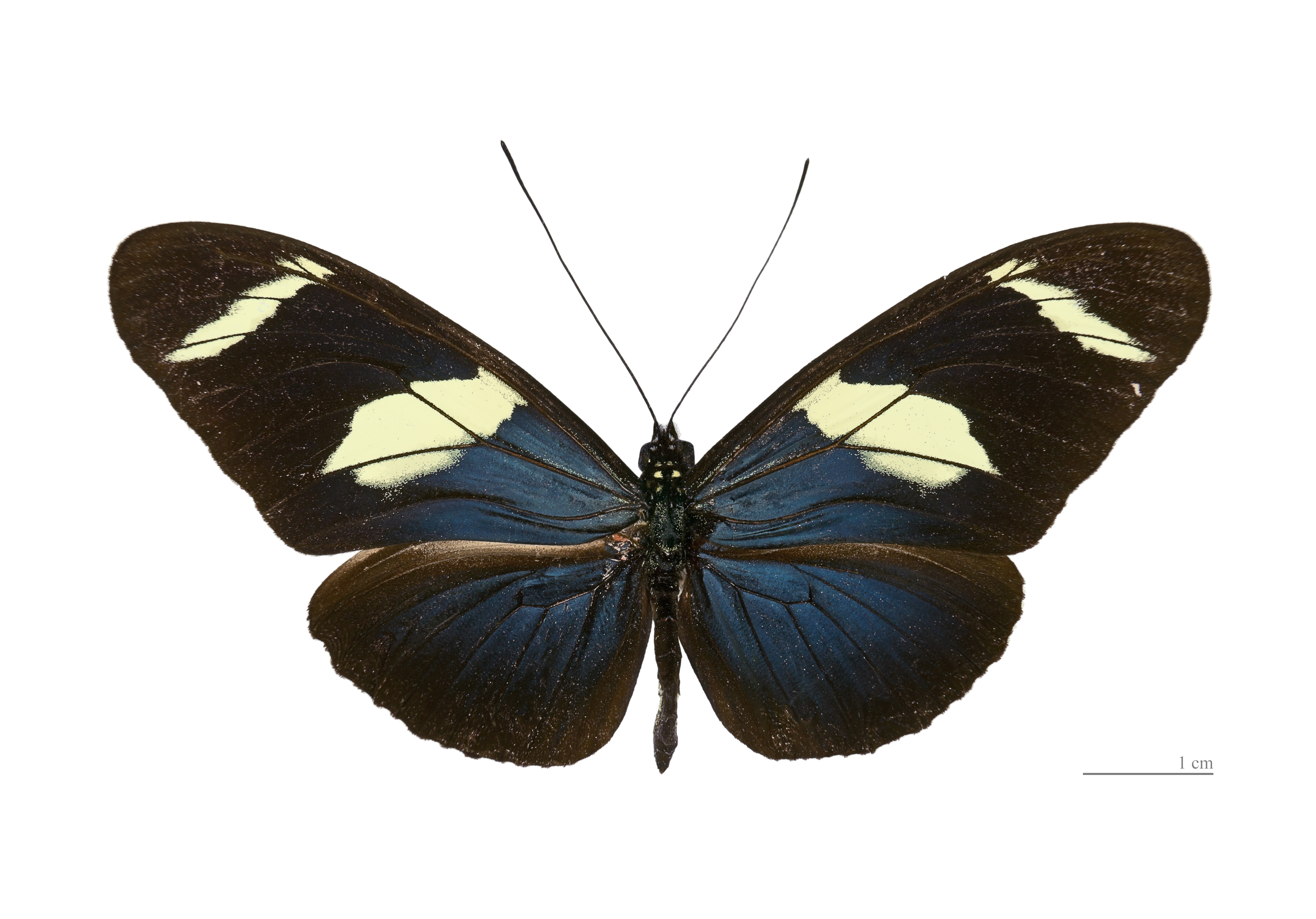
- Dorsal view
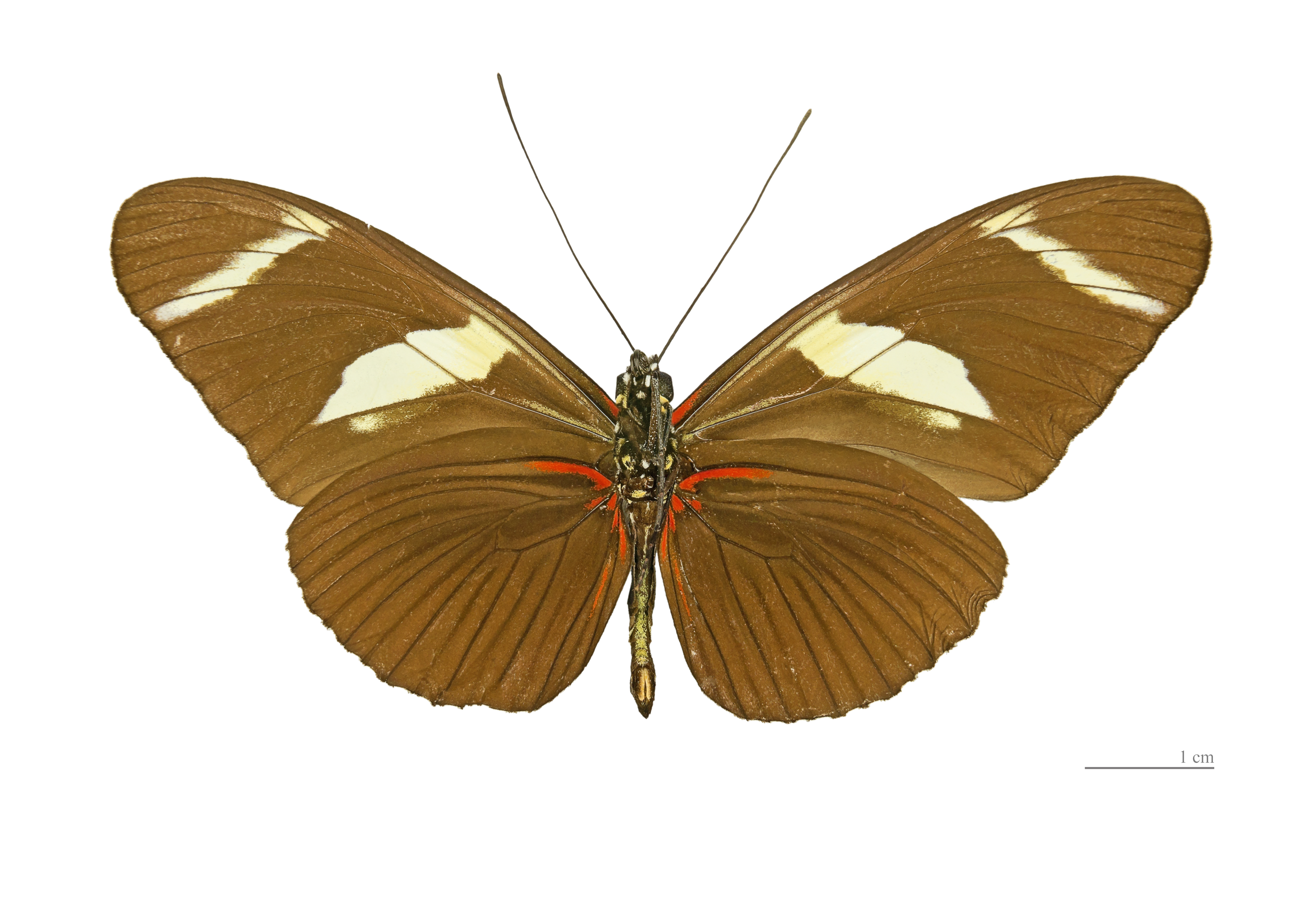
- Ventral view

Scientific classification
- Kingdom: Animalia
- Phylum: Arthropoda
- Class: Insecta
- Order: Lepidoptera
- Family: Nymphalidae
- Genus: Heliconius
- Species: H. wallacei

Binomial name
- Heliconius wallacei (Reakirt, 1866)

Synonyms
- Heliconius clytia ab. parvimaculata Riffarth, 1900; Heliconius clytia f. flavescens ab. wucherpfennigi Krüger, 1933; Heliconius wallacei ab. erichi Krüger, 1933; Heliconius mimulinus Butler, 1873; Heliconius clytia var. colon Weymer, 1891; Heliconius clytia var. sulphurea Staudinger, [1897]; Heliconius hagar Kirby, [1900]; Heliconius wallacei f. quadrimaculata Neustetter, 1925; Heliconius clytia f. flavescens ab. graphitica Krüger, 1933; Heliconius wallacei f. inez Stammeshaus, 1982; Heliconius clytia var. colon Weymer, 1891; Papilio clytia Cramer, 1776 (preocc. Linnaeus, 1758); Heliconius clytia var. elsa Riffarth, 1899; Heliconius wallacei brevimaculata ab. halli Kaye, 1919; Heliconius wallacei latus Kaye, 1925 (preocc. Riffarth, 1900)

= Heliconius wallacei =

Wallace's longwing

Species of butterfly

Heliconius wallacei, the Wallace's longwing, is a butterfly of the family Nymphalidae. It was described by Tryon Reakirt in 1866. It is found from Venezuela and Trinidad to southern Brazil and Peru. The habitat consists of lowland rainforests.

The wingspan is 70–75 mm.

The larvae are gregarious and mostly feed on Passiflora species from the subgenus Distephana.

== Subspecies ==
- H. w. wallacei (Brazil: Pará)
- H. w. araguaia Brown, 1976 (Brazil: Goiás)
- H. w. colon Weymer, 1891 (Surinam, Brazil: Amazonas)
- H. w. flavescens Weymer, 1891 (Ecuador, Peru, Guyana, Bolivia)
- H. w. kayei Neustetter, 1929 (Trinidad)
- H. w. mimulinus Butler, 1873 (Colombia)
