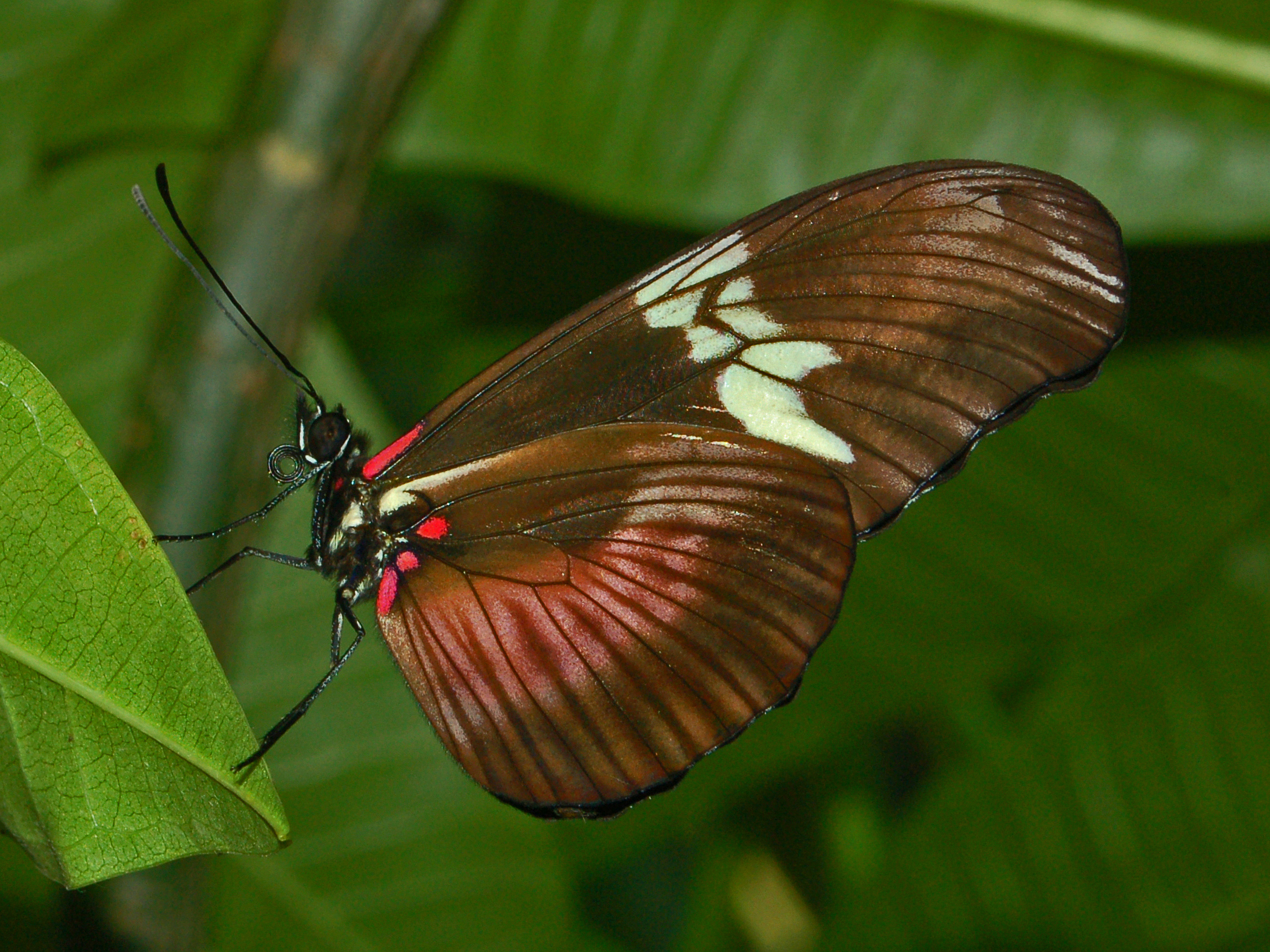
- Ventral view

Scientific classification
- Kingdom: Animalia
- Phylum: Arthropoda
- Class: Insecta
- Order: Lepidoptera
- Family: Nymphalidae
- Genus: Heliconius
- Species: H. hortense

Binomial name
- Heliconius hortense Guérin, [1844]

Synonyms
- Heliconia hortensia; Heliconius hertensia

= Heliconius hortense =

Mexican longwing

Species of butterfly

Heliconius hortense, the Mexican longwing, Mexican heliconian or mountain longwing, is a heliconiid butterfly.

== Description ==
The basic color of the uppersides of the wings is black, with a vertical white band on the forewings and an horizontal red band on the hindwings. The undersides are dark brown, with a white band on the forewings and a few red spots at the base of the hindwings. The adults feed on pollens and live up to six months. Females usually lay yellow eggs singly on shoots of various host plants, mainly Passiflora species, of which caterpillars primarily feed.

== Distribution ==
Heliconius hortense occurs in eastern and western Mexico and from Honduras to Ecuador.

== Habitat ==
This species can be found in cloud forest from sea level to 2300 m.
