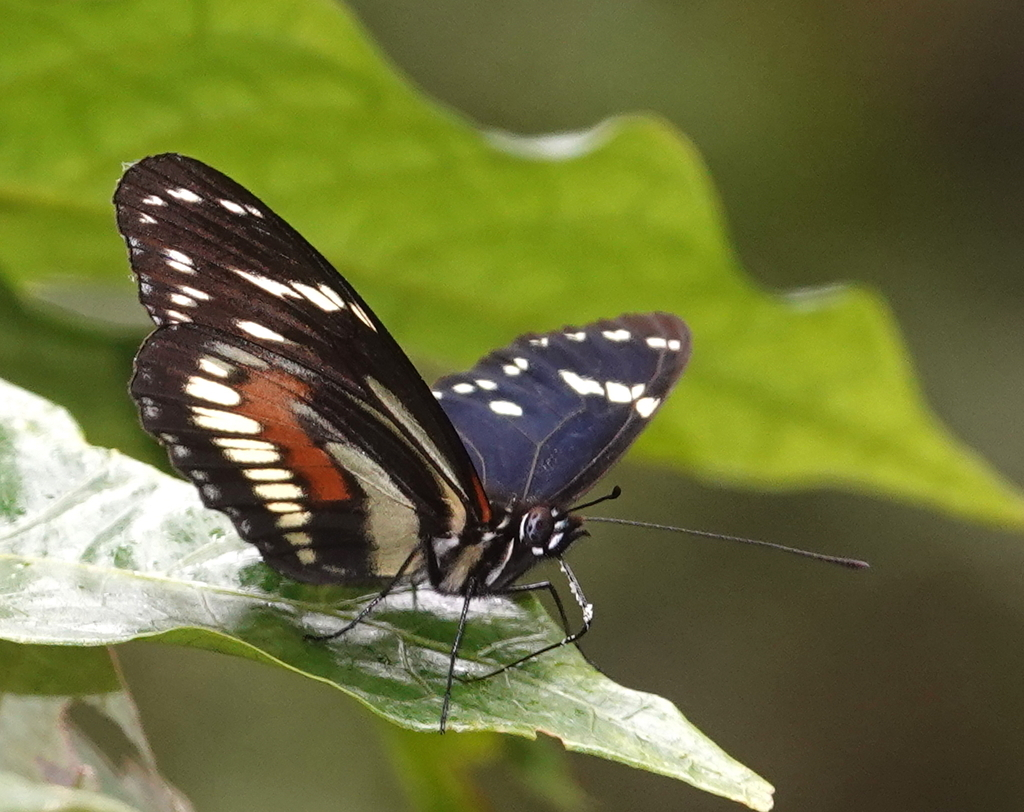

Scientific classification
- Domain: Eukaryota
- Kingdom: Animalia
- Phylum: Arthropoda
- Class: Insecta
- Order: Lepidoptera
- Family: Nymphalidae
- Genus: Heliconius
- Species: H. hecuba

Binomial name
- Heliconius hecuba Hewitson, 1853

Subspecies
- 11, see text

Synonyms
- Heliconius cassandra C. & R. Felder, 1862; Heliconia choarina Hewitson, 1872; Blanchardia dismorphia Buchecker, [1880]; Heliconia hecuba choarina f. cacica Neustetter, 1928; Heliconius tolima Fassl, 1912; Heliconius hecuba choarinus f. flava Neustetter, 1928; Heliconius crispus var. crespinus Krüger, 1925

= Heliconius hecuba =

Hecuba longwing

Species of butterfly

Heliconius hecuba, the Hecuba longwing, is a species of butterfly of the family Nymphalidae. It lives at altitudes ranging from 1000 to 2400 m in cloud forests in the northern Andes from Colombia to Ecuador.

The butterfly is named for Hecuba, the wife of King Priam of ancient Troy.

The larvae feed on plants from the genus Granadilla.

== Subspecies ==
Listed alphabetically:

- H. h. bonplandi Neukirchen, 1991 (Ecuador)
- H. h. cassandra C. & R. Felder, 1862 (Colombia)
- H. h. choarina Hewitson, 1872 (Ecuador)
- H. h. creusa H. & R. Holzinger, 1989 (Colombia)
- H. h. crispus Staudinger, 1885 (Colombia)
- H. h. flava Brown, 1979 (Ecuador)
- H. h. hecuba Hewitson, 1858 (Colombia)
- H. h. lamasi Neukirchen, 1991 (Ecuador)
- H. h. salazari Neukirchen, 1993 (Colombia)
- H. h. tolima Fassl, 1912 (Colombia)
- H. h. walteri Salazar, 1998 (Colombia)
