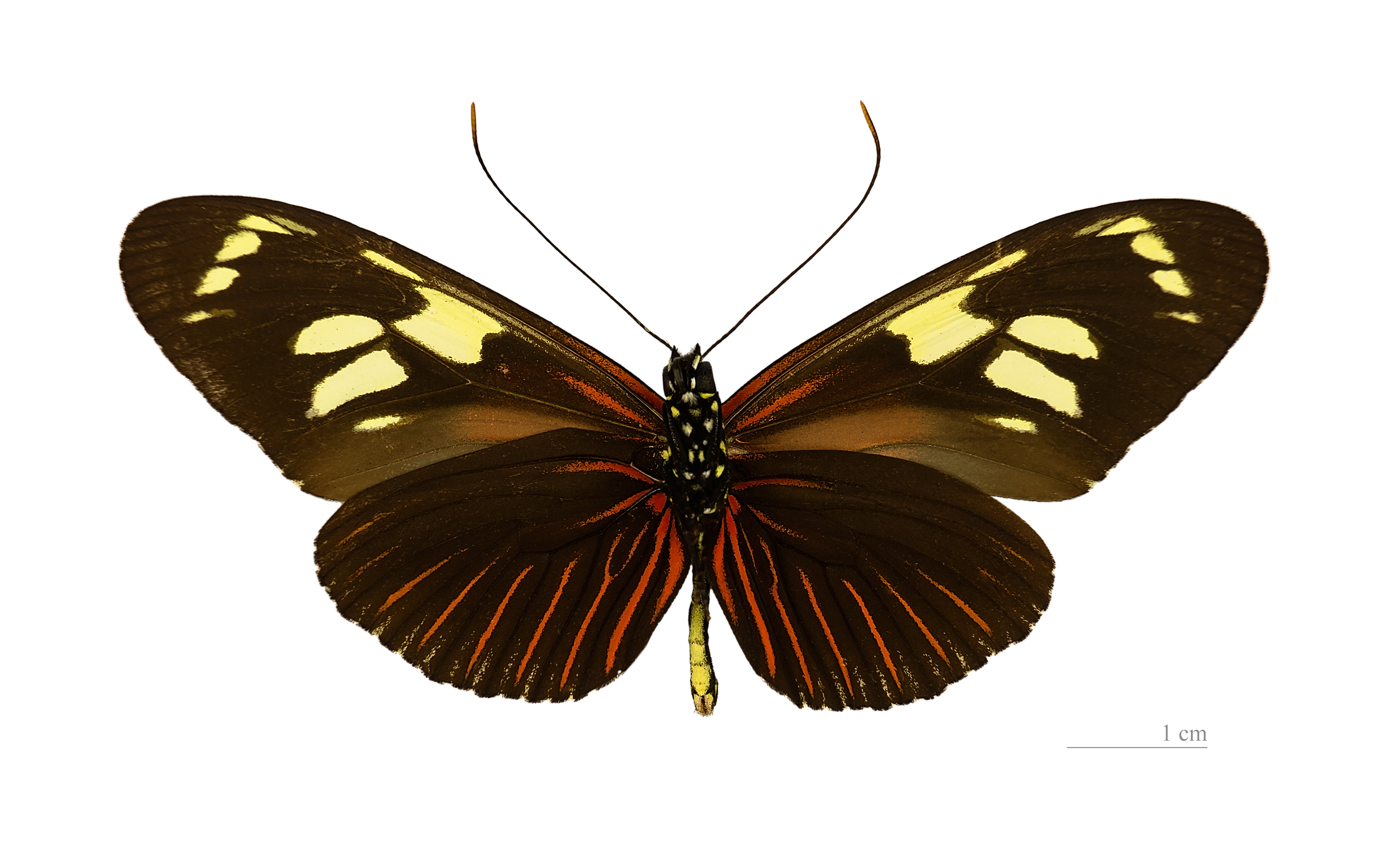
- Ventral view

Scientific classification
- Domain: Eukaryota
- Kingdom: Animalia
- Phylum: Arthropoda
- Class: Insecta
- Order: Lepidoptera
- Family: Nymphalidae
- Genus: Heliconius
- Species: H. burneyi

Binomial name
- Heliconius burneyi (Hübner, 1831)

Synonyms
- Migonitis burneyi Hübner, [1831]; Heliconius burneyi var. jeanneae Boullet & Le Cerf, 1909; Heliconius burneyi f. oberthüri Boullet & Le Cerf, 1909 (preocc. Riffarth, 1903); Heliconius burneyi f. roseni Krüger, 1928; Heliconius catharinae Staudinger, 1885; Heliconius burneyi serpensis Kaye, 1919; Heliconius burneyi f. catharinae ab. vitiosa Krüger, 1933; Heliconius burneyi f. miraculosa Kotzsch, 1936; Heliconius burneyi var. huebneri Staudinger, [1897]; Heliconius lindigii C. & R. Felder, [1865]; Heliconius burneyi jeanneae f. reducta Boullet & Le Cerf, 1909

= Heliconius burneyi =

- Dorsal view

Species of butterfly

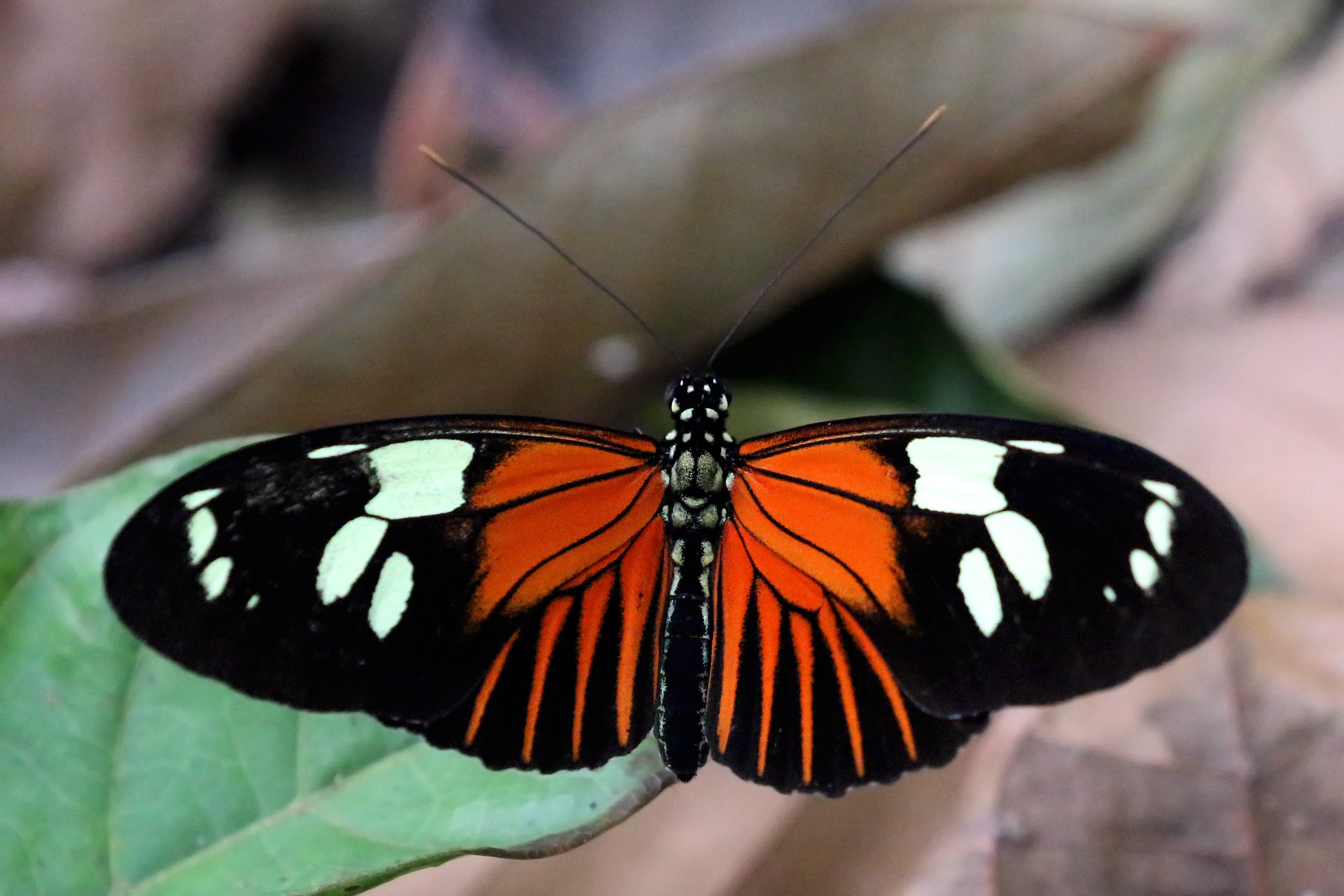
H. b. catharinae variation serpensis Cristalino River, Southern Amazon, Brazil

Heliconius burneyi, the Burney's longwing, is a butterfly of the family Nymphalidae. It was described by Jacob Hübner in 1831. It is found in the Amazon basin. The habitat consists of tall forests.

== Subspecies ==
- Heliconius burneyi burneyi (French Guiana)
- Heliconius burneyi ada Neustetter, 1925 (Brazil: Rondônia)
- Heliconius burneyi anjae Neukirchen, 1995 (Brazil: Amazonas)
- Heliconius burneyi boliviensis Neukirchen, 1995 (Bolivia)
- Heliconius burneyi catharinae Staudinger, 1885 (Brazil: Pará, Amazonas)
- Heliconius burneyi huebneri Staudinger, 1897 (Peru)
- Heliconius burneyi jamesi Neukirchen, 1995 (Peru)
- Heliconius burneyi koenigi Neukirchen, 1995 (Peru)
- Heliconius burneyi lindigii C. & R. Felder, 1865 (Colombia)
- Heliconius burneyi mirtarosa Orellana, 2006 (Venezuela)
- Heliconius burneyi skinneri Brown & Fernández, 1985 (Venezuela)
