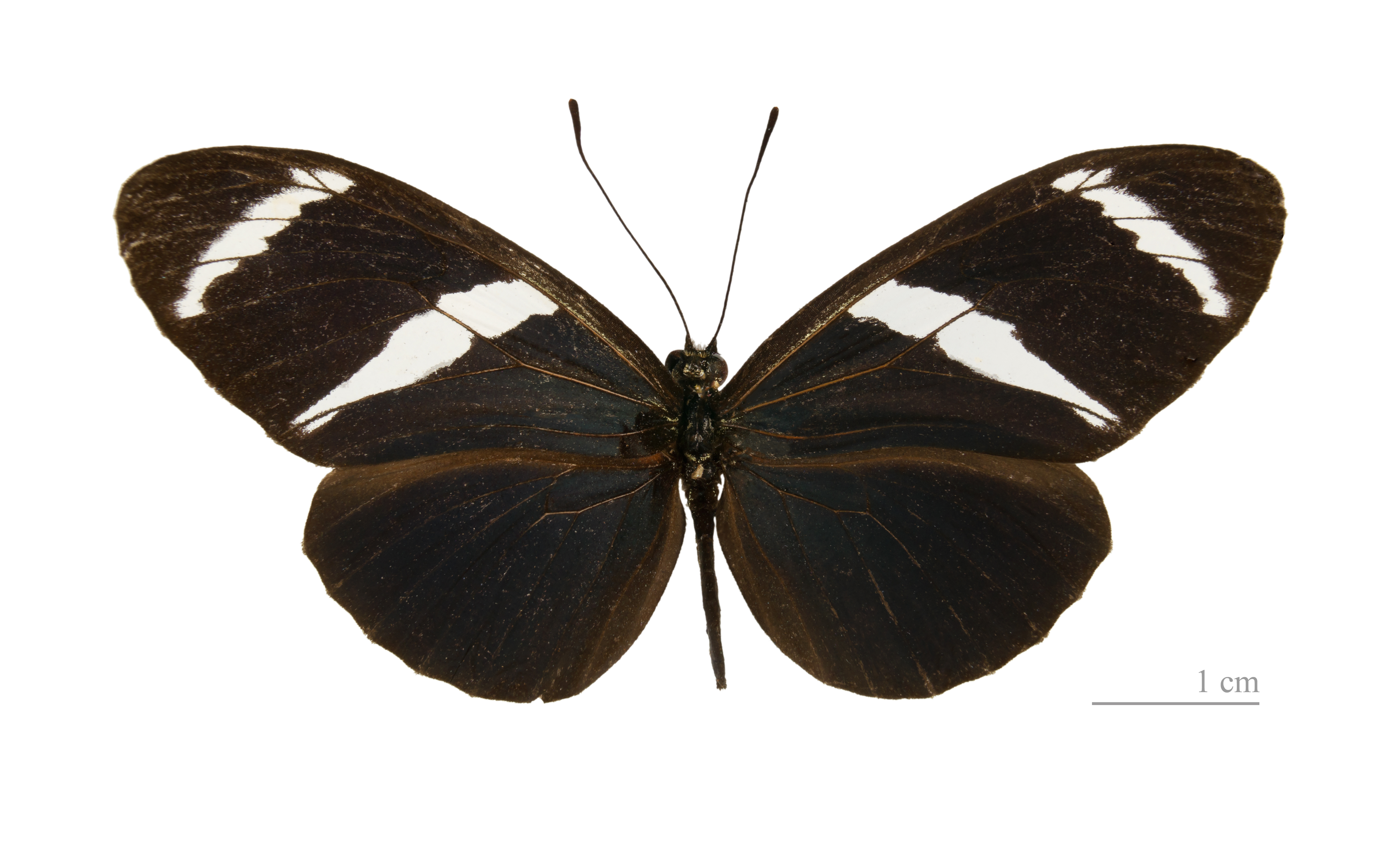
- Dorsal view
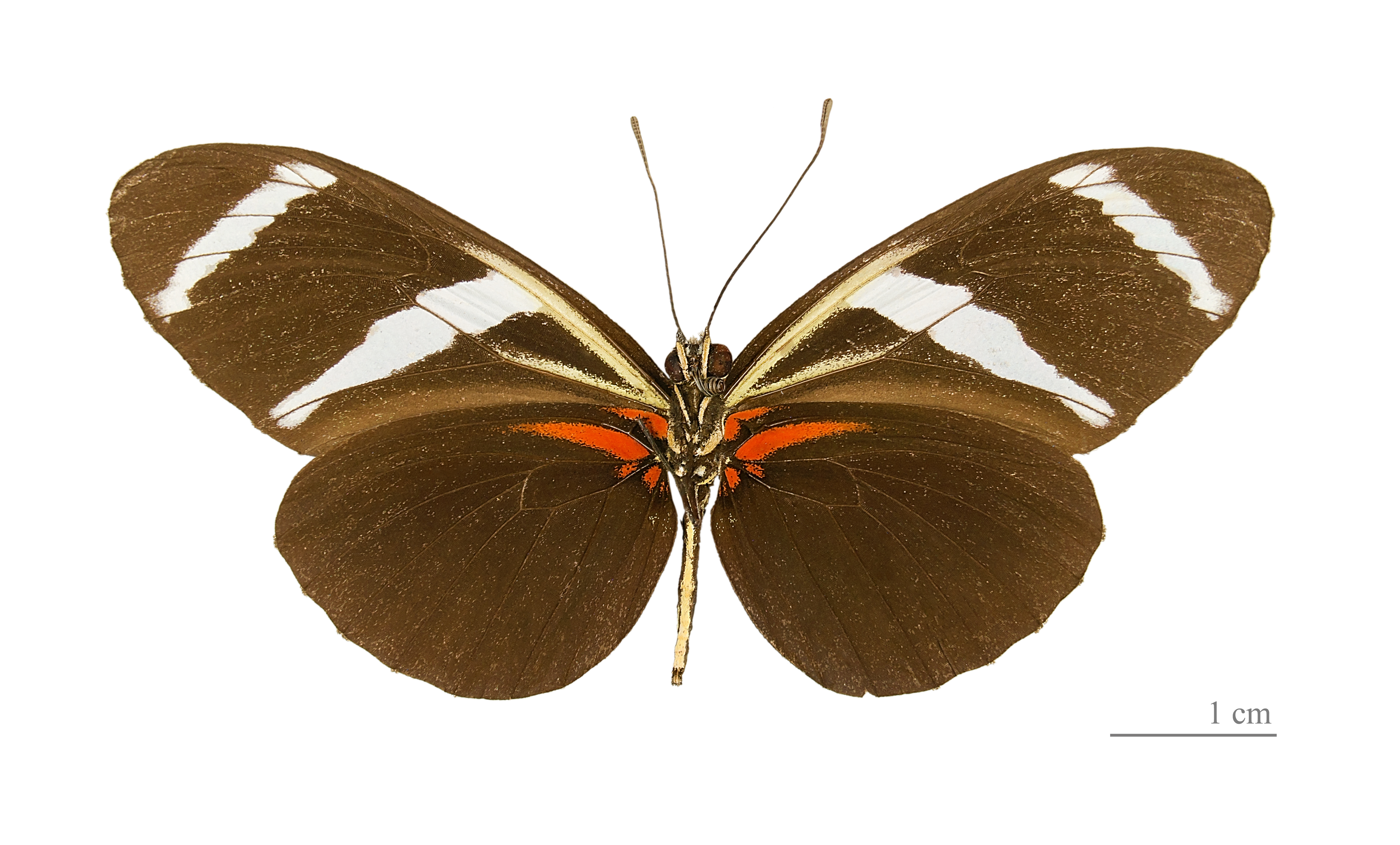
- Ventral view

Scientific classification
- Kingdom: Animalia
- Phylum: Arthropoda
- Class: Insecta
- Order: Lepidoptera
- Family: Nymphalidae
- Genus: Heliconius
- Species: H. antiochus

Binomial name
- Heliconius antiochus (Linnaeus, 1767)

Synonyms
- Papilio antiochus Linnaeus, 1767 (nec Fabricius); Heliconius zobeide Butler, 1869; Heliconius antiochus ab. divisus Staudinger, [1897]; Heliconius antiochus ab. alba Riffarth, 1900; Heliconius antiochus alba ab. trimaculata Krüger, 1933; Papilio aranea Fabricius, 1793; Heliconius salvinii Dewitz, 1877; Heliconius antiochus var. araneides Staudinger, 1897

= Heliconius antiochus =

Species of butterfly

Heliconius antiochus, the Antiochus longwing, is a butterfly of the family Nymphalidae. It was described by Carl Linnaeus in 1767. It is found from Panama to the Amazon region. The habitat consists of riparian forests.

== Subspecies ==
- Heliconius antiochus antiochus (Venezuela to Peru)
- Heliconius antiochus aranea (Fabricius, 1793) (Venezuela)
- Heliconius antiochus araneides Staudinger, 1897 (Venezuela)
- Heliconius antiochus salvinii Dewitz, 1877 (Venezuela)
