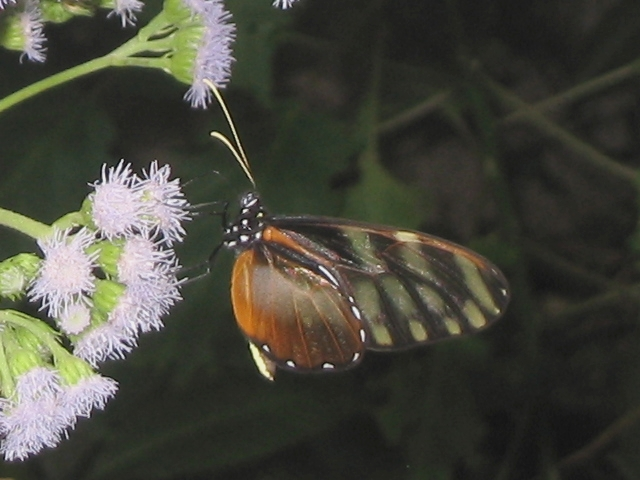

Scientific classification
- Domain: Eukaryota
- Kingdom: Animalia
- Phylum: Arthropoda
- Class: Insecta
- Order: Lepidoptera
- Family: Nymphalidae
- Genus: Heliconius
- Species: H. hecalesia

Binomial name
- Heliconius hecalesia Hewitson, 1853

Subspecies
- Seven, see text

Synonyms
- Heliconia hecalesia Hewitson, [1854]; Heliconius formosus Bates, 1866; Heliconius octavia Bates, 1866; Heliconius hecalesia ernestus Brown & Benson, 1975

= Heliconius hecalesia =

Five-spotted longwing

Species of butterfly

Heliconius hecalesia, the five-spotted longwing, is a species of butterfly of the family Nymphalidae. It is found from Central America to Venezuela and Ecuador.

The wingspan is 50–61 mm. Adults feed on flower nectar.

The larvae feed on plants from the subgenera Tryphostemmatoides and Plectostemma, including Passiflora biflora and Passiflora lancearea. They are gregarious. Pupation takes place in a slate grey pupa with black markings.

== Subspecies ==
- H. h. hecalesia (Colombia)
- H. h. formosus Bates, 1866 (Costa Rica, Panama, Nicaragua)
- H. h. octavia Bates, 1866 (Guatemala)
- H. h. gynaesia Hewitson, 1875
- H. h. longarena Hewitson, 1875 (Colombia)
- H. h. eximius Stichel, 1923 (Colombia)
- H. h. romeroi Brown & Fernández, 1985 (Venezuela)
