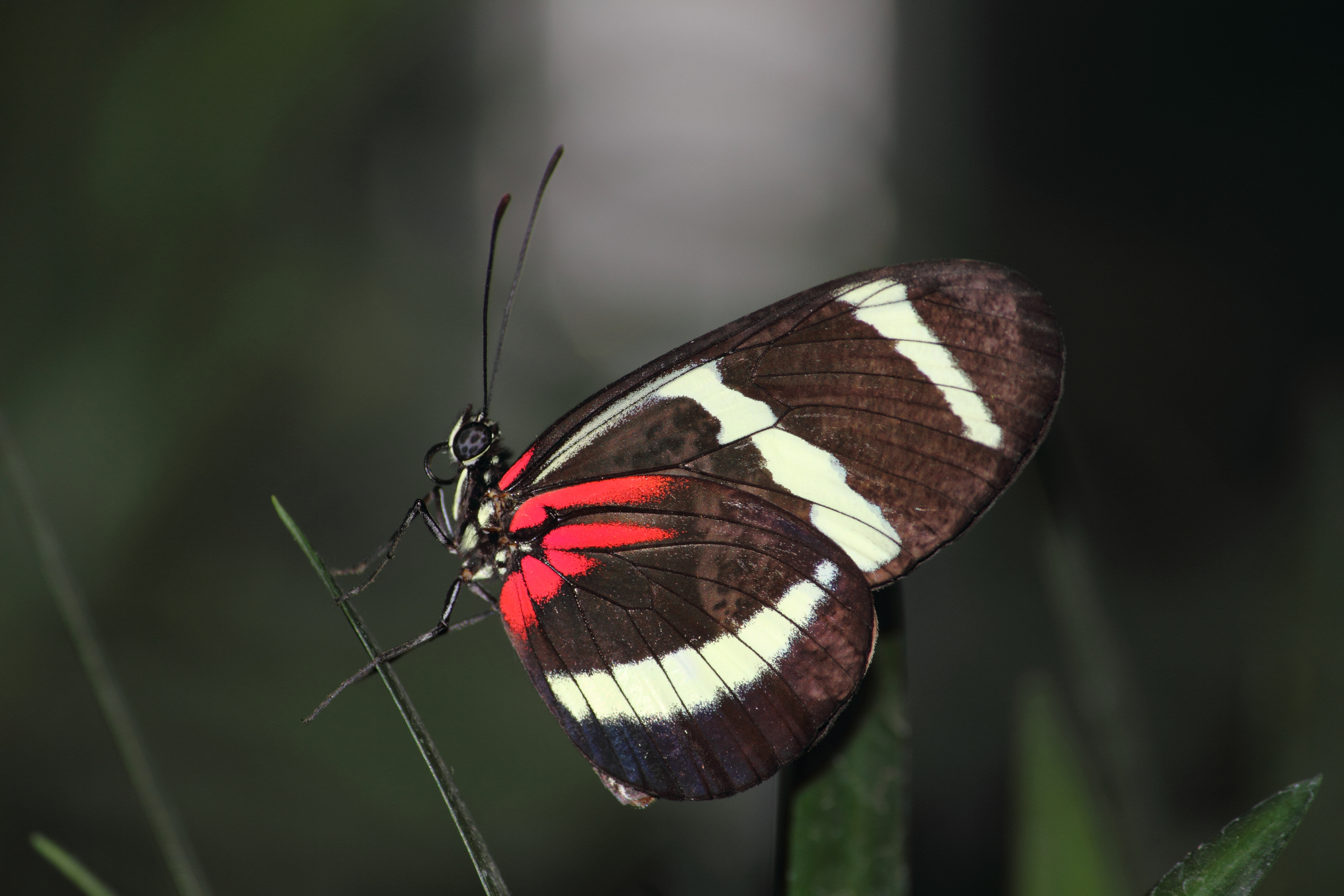

Scientific classification
- Kingdom: Animalia
- Phylum: Arthropoda
- Class: Insecta
- Order: Lepidoptera
- Family: Nymphalidae
- Genus: Heliconius
- Species: H. hewitsoni

Binomial name
- Heliconius hewitsoni Staudinger, 1875

= Heliconius hewitsoni =

Species of butterfly

Heliconius hewitsoni is a species of brush-footed butterfly in the genus Heliconius.

== Description ==
This butterfly has black wings with two white stripes on the forewing. The undersides of the wings are similar but also contain small red patches close to the body. The caterpillar is yellow and green and consumes Passifloraceae. It pupates in groups in a chrysalis that is pale yellow to pale brown and covered in black veins and spines.

== Habitat ==
Heliconius hewitsoni can be found on the Pacific Slope of western Panama and Costa Rica. It is found in forests, usually in the canopy.
