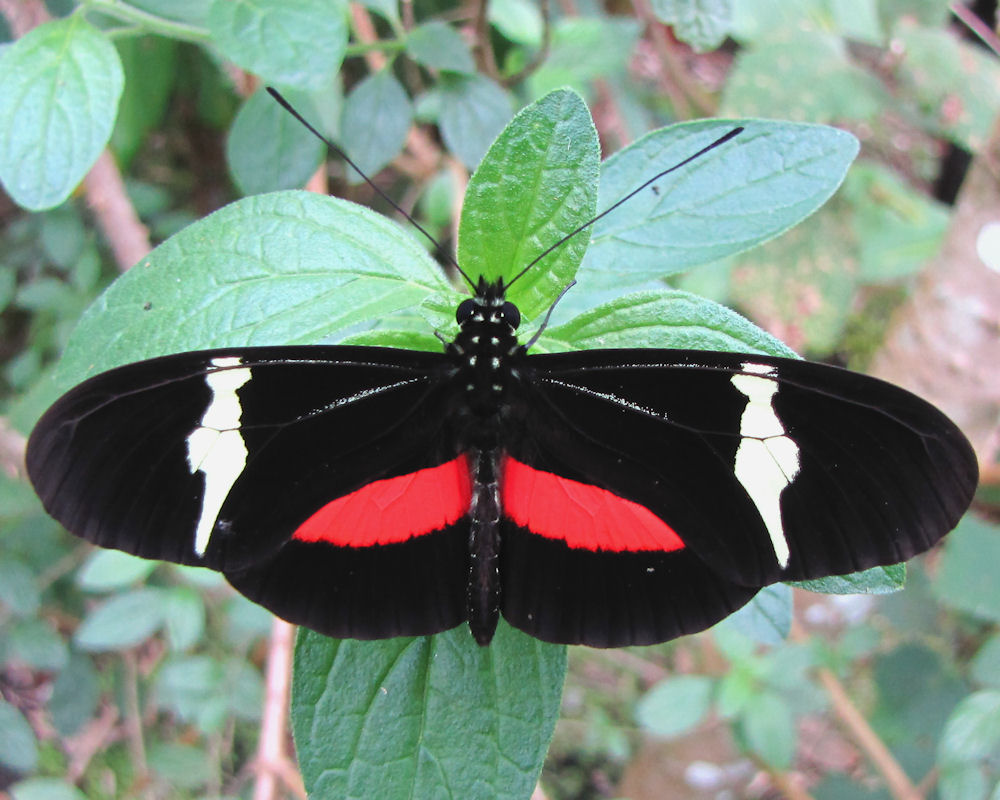
- Dorsal view of H. c. clysonymus, Arví Park, Colombia
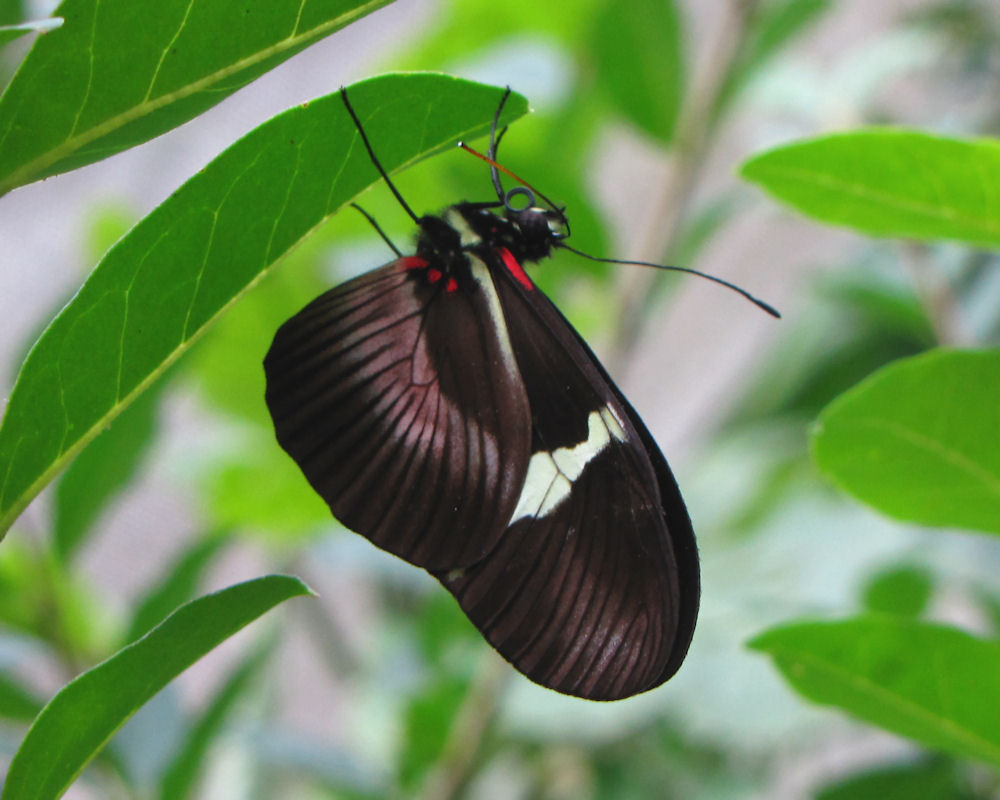
- Ventral view of H. c. clysonymus, also at Arví Park

Scientific classification
- Domain: Eukaryota
- Kingdom: Animalia
- Phylum: Arthropoda
- Class: Insecta
- Order: Lepidoptera
- Family: Nymphalidae
- Genus: Heliconius
- Species: H. clysonymus

Binomial name
- Heliconius clysonymus Latreille, [1817]

Synonyms
- Heliconius clysonimus fischeri Fassl, 1912; Heliconius clysonimus flavopunctatus Fassl, 1912; Heliconius micrus Seitz, 1912; Heliconius clysonymus apicalis Joicey & Kaye, 1917; Heliconius clysonymus apicalis ab. semirubra Joicey & Kaye, 1917; Heliconius clysonymus perbellus Stichel, 1923; Heliconius hygianus fischeri f. leonis H. & R. Holzinger, 1970; Heliconius hygianus fischeri f. leoncitonis H. & R. Holzinger, 1970; Heliconia hygiana Hewitson, 1867; Heliconius hygiana ab. albescens Kaye, 1916; Heliconius montanus Salvin, 1871

= Heliconius clysonymus =

Clysonymus longwing

Species of butterfly

Heliconius clysonymus, the Clysonymus longwing, yellow longwing or montane longwing, is a species of Heliconius butterfly found in Central and South America.

== Subspecies ==
Listed alphabetically:

- H. c. clysonymus Latreille, [1817] – (Colombia)
- H. c. hygiana (Hewitson, 1867) – (Ecuador)
- H. c. montanus Salvin, 1871 – montane longwing (Costa Rica, Panama)
- H. c. tabaconas Brown, 1976 – (Peru, Costa Rica)
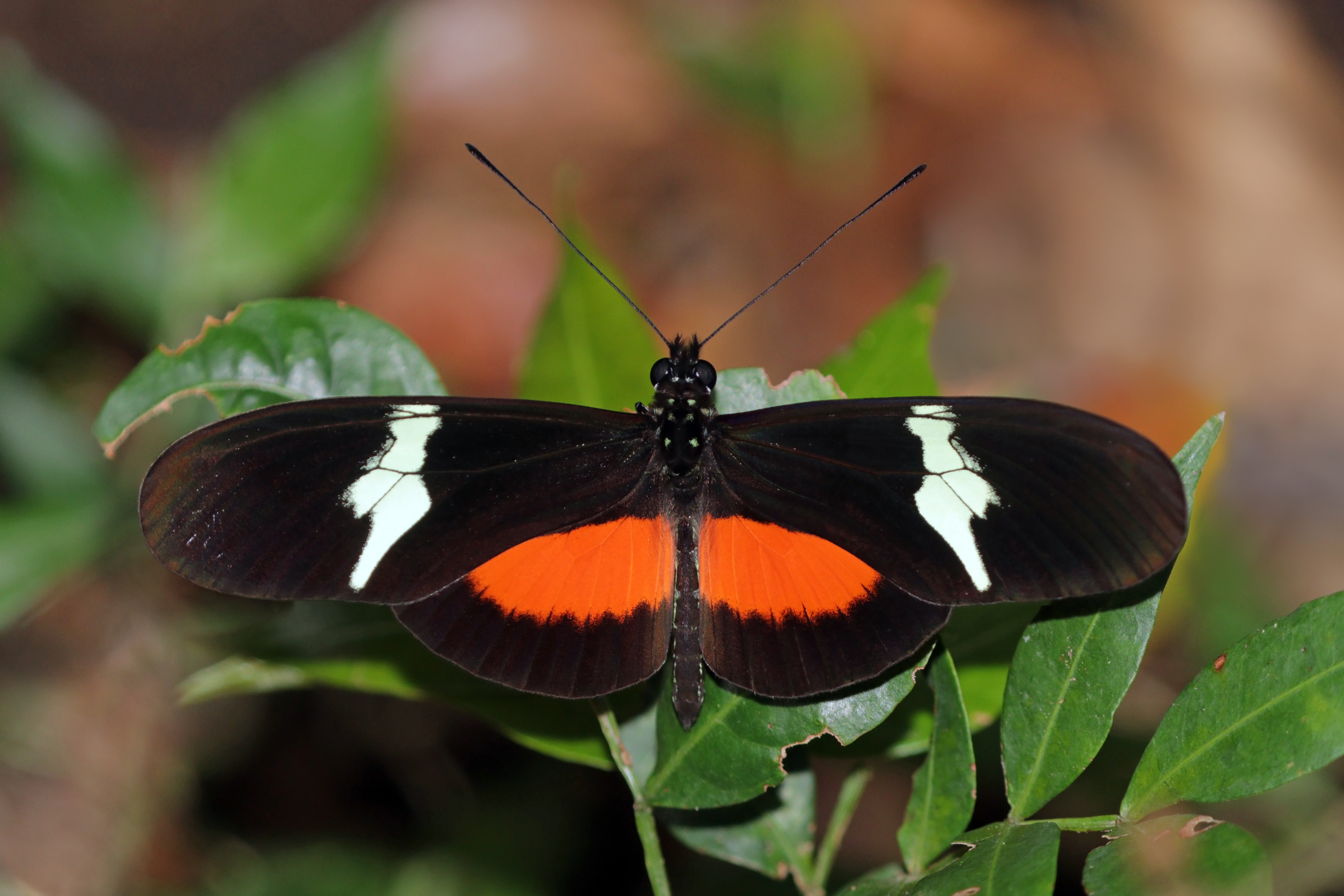
H. c. montanus
Mount Totumas cloud forest, Panama

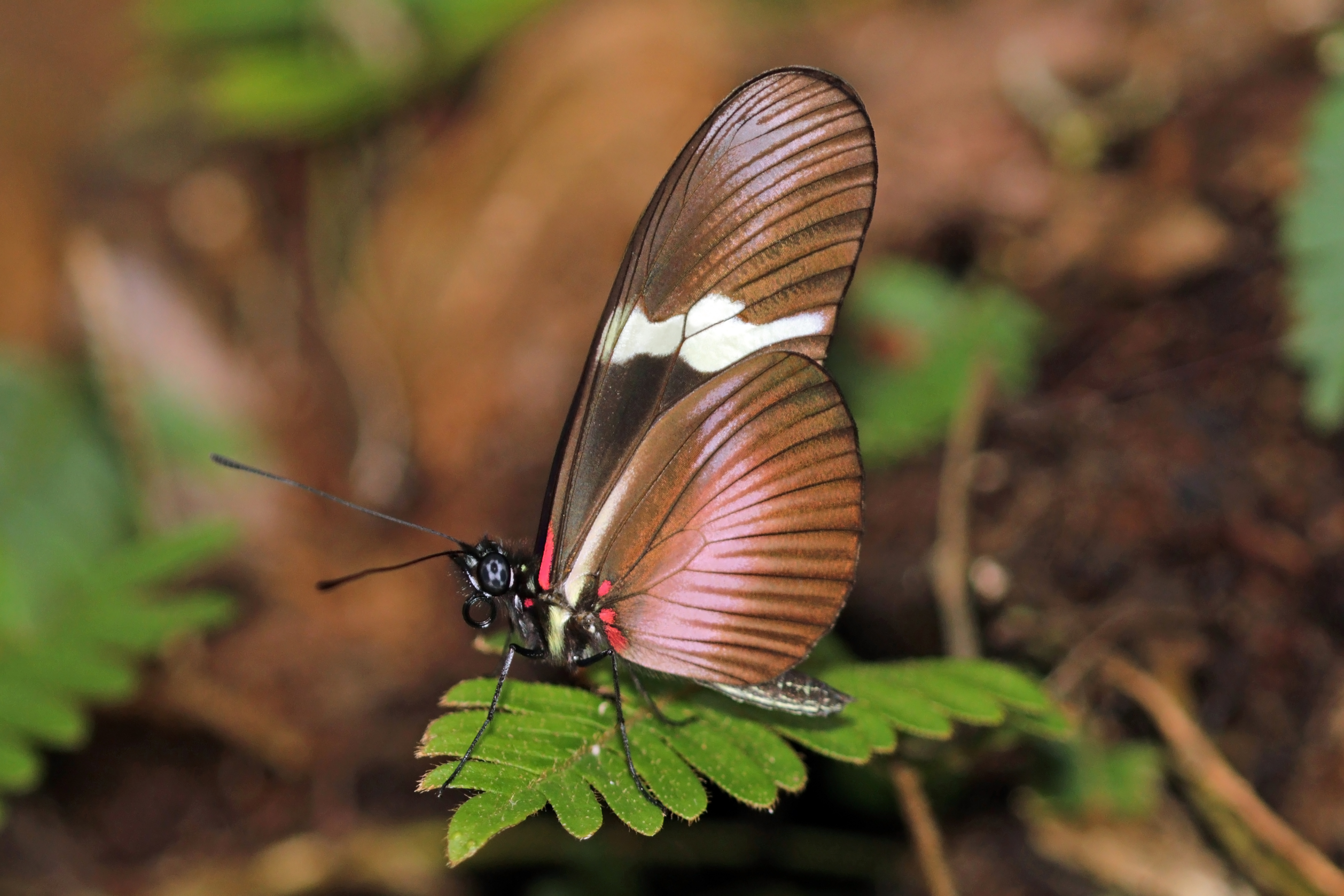
H. c. montanus
Mount Totumas cloud forest, Panama
