= Heliconius lalitae =

Scientific classification
- Kingdom: Animalia
- Phylum: Arthropoda
- Clade: Pancrustacea
- Class: Insecta
- Order: Lepidoptera
- Family: Nymphalidae
- Genus: Heliconius
- Species: H. lalitae

Binomial name
- Heliconius lalitae Brévignon, 1996

Species of butterfly

Heliconius lalitae is a butterfly of the family Nymphalidae. It was described by Christian Brévignon in 1996. It is endemic to French Guiana.

In scientific literature, Heliconius lalitae is mentioned as one of the rarer Heliconius species, found "at low density in infrequently visited areas," making it difficult to include in comprehensive studies of the genus.

== Visual Description ==
Heliconius lalitae has yellow distal spots and red square sections on its wings. There is also a basal transverse red stripe through the discoid cell of the hind wings.
