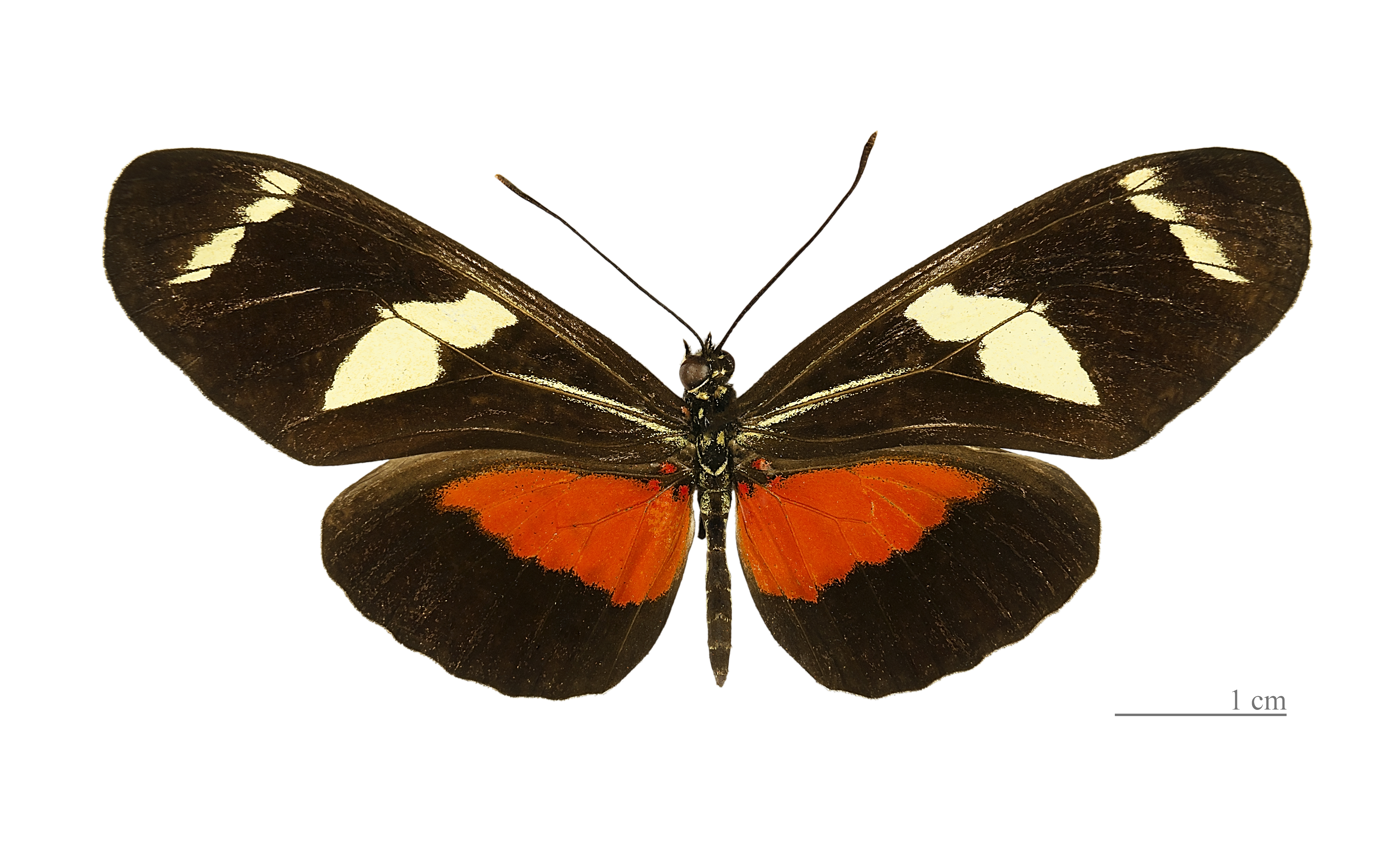
- Dorsal view
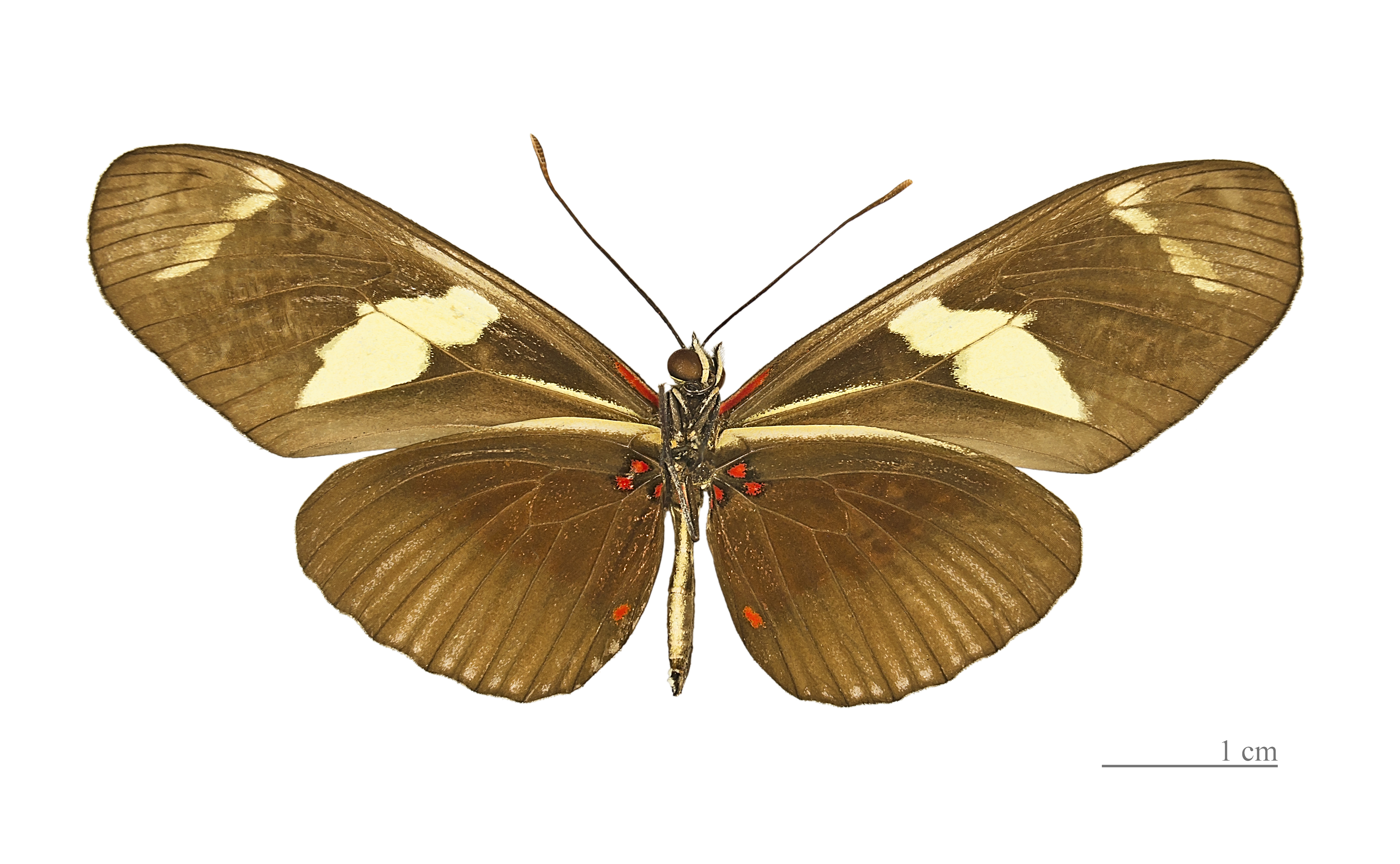
- Ventral view

Scientific classification
- Kingdom: Animalia
- Phylum: Arthropoda
- Class: Insecta
- Order: Lepidoptera
- Family: Nymphalidae
- Genus: Heliconius
- Species: H. ricini

Binomial name
- Heliconius ricini (Linnaeus, 1758)

Synonyms
- Papilio ricini Linnaeus, 1758; Papilio myrti Fabricius, 1775; Papilio polyhymnia Shaw, 1806; Eueides ricini insulanus Stichel, 1909

= Heliconius ricini =

Ricini longwing

Species of butterfly

Heliconius ricini, the ricini longwing, is a butterfly of the family Nymphalidae. It was described by Carl Linnaeus in 1758. It is found from Venezuela and Trinidad to the Guianas and northern Brazil. The habitat consists of savanna-type areas.

== Subspecies ==
- Heliconius ricini ricini (northern South America)
- Heliconius ricini insulanus (Stichel, 1909) (Trinidad)
