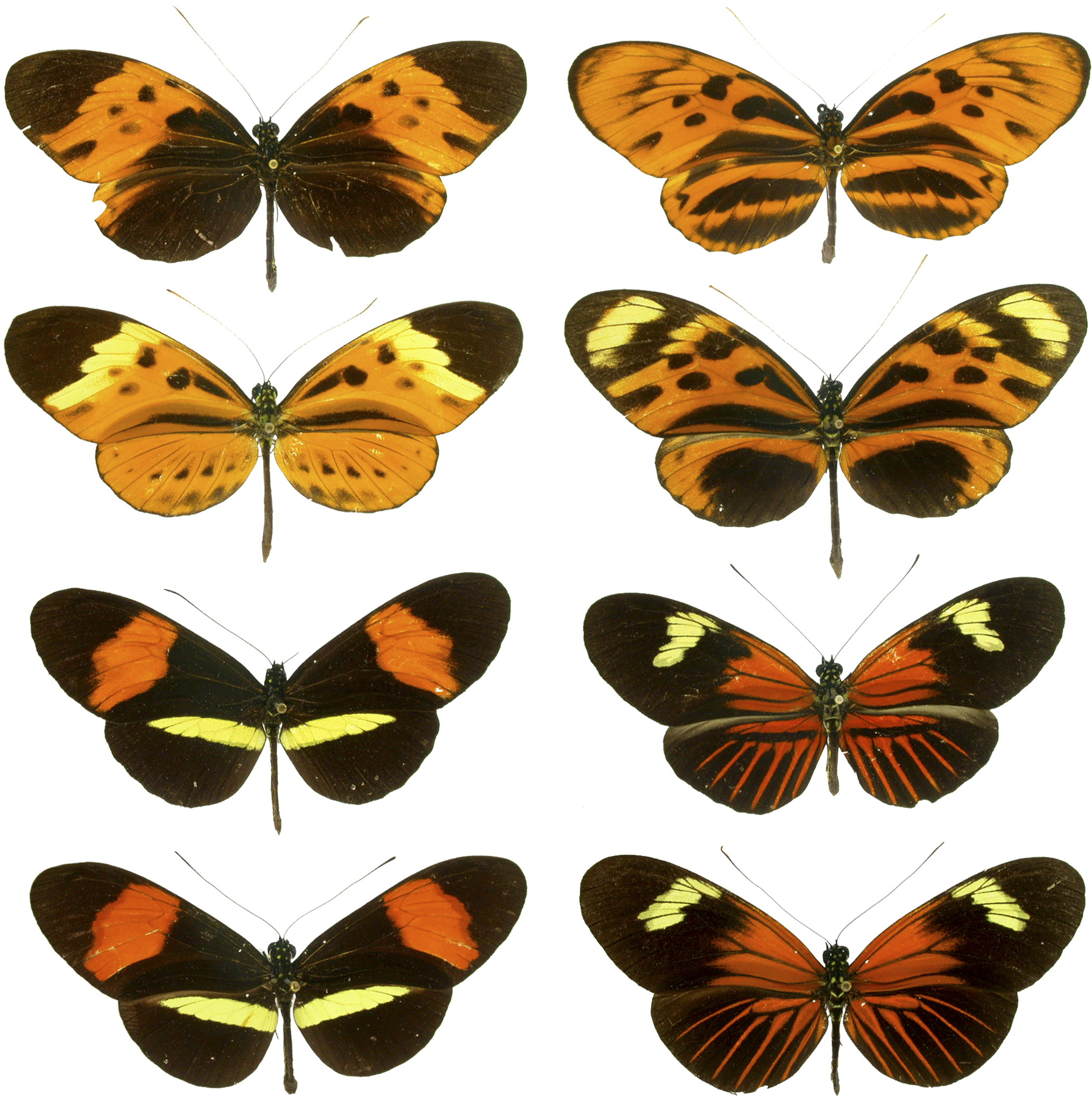
- Forms of Heliconius numata, H. melpomene and H. erato

Scientific classification
- Kingdom: Animalia
- Phylum: Arthropoda
- Clade: Pancrustacea
- Class: Insecta
- Order: Lepidoptera
- Family: Nymphalidae
- Tribe: Heliconiini
- Genus: Heliconius; Kluk, 1780

Type species
- Papilio charithonia Linnaeus, 1767

Species
- About 39, see species list in text.

Synonyms
- Ajantis Hübner, 1816; Apostraphia Hübner, 1816; Blanchardia Buchecker, 1880 (non Castelnau, 1875: preoccupied); Crenis Hübner, 1821; Heliconia Godart 1819; Laparus Billberg, 1820; Migonitis Hübner, 1816 (non Rafinesque, 1815: preoccupied); Neruda Turner, 1976; Phlogris Hübner, 1825; Podalirius Gistel, 1848; Sunias Hübner, 1816; Sicyonia Hübner, 1816

= Heliconius =

Genus of brush-footed butterflies

Heliconius comprises a colorful and widespread genus of brush-footed butterflies commonly known as the longwings or heliconians. This genus is distributed throughout the tropical and subtropical regions of the New World, from South America as far north as the southern United States. The larvae of these butterflies eat passion flower vines (Passifloraceae). Adults exhibit bright wing color patterns which signal their distastefulness to potential predators.

Brought to the forefront of scientific attention by Victorian naturalists, these butterflies exhibit a striking diversity and mimicry, both amongst themselves and with species in other groups of butterflies and moths. The study of Heliconius and other groups of mimetic butterflies allowed the English naturalist Henry Walter Bates, following his return from Brazil in 1859, to lend support to Charles Darwin, who had found similar diversity amongst the Galápagos finches.

== Model for evolutionary study ==
Heliconius butterflies have been a subject of many studies, due partly to their abundance and the relative ease of breeding them under laboratory conditions, but also because of the extensive mimicry that occurs in this group. From the nineteenth century to the present day, their study has helped scientists to understand how new species are formed and why nature is so diverse. In particular, the genus is suitable for the study of both Batesian mimicry and Müllerian mimicry.

Because of the type of plant material that Heliconius caterpillars favor and the resulting poisons they store in their tissues, the adult butterflies are usually unpalatable to predators. This warning is announced, to the mutual benefit of both parties, by bright colors and contrasting wing patterns, a phenomenon known as aposematism. Heliconius butterflies are thus Müllerian mimics of one another, and are also involved in Müllerian mimicry with various species of Ithomiini, Danaini, Riodinidae (Ithomeis and Stalachtis), and Acraeini, as well as pericopine arctiid moths. They are probably the models for various palatable Batesian mimics, including Papilio zagreus and various Phyciodina.

=== Convergence ===
Heliconius butterflies such as Heliconius numata are famous practitioners of Müllerian mimicry, and benefit from mimicking other unpalatable species of butterfly in their local habitat, such as Melinaea. This type of mimicry typically results in convergent evolution, whereby many (sometimes unrelated) species become protected by similar patterns or coloration. This is a distinct strategy from the better-known Batesian mimicry. In Batesian mimics defensive coloration or patterns are a bluff, mimicking those of actually poisonous or foul-tasting species. In Müllerian mimicry all species of the set have honest warnings, but the similarity between members of a set allows a single encounter between a predator and one member of the set to deter that predator in all future encounters with all members of the set. In this way multiple, often unrelated species, effectively cooperate with one another to educate their mutual predators.

Work has been done to understand the genetic changes responsible for the convergent evolution of wing patterns in comimetic species. Molecular work on two distantly related Heliconius comimics, Heliconius melpomene and Heliconius erato, has revealed that homologous genomic regions in the species are responsible for the convergence in wing patterns. Also, Supple had found evidence of two co-mimics H. erato and H. melpomene having no shared single-nucleotide polymorphisms (SNPs), which would be indicative of introgression, and hypothesized the same regulatory genes for color/pattern had comparably changed in response to the same selective forces. Similarly, molecular evidence indicates that Heliconius numata shares the same patterning homologues, but that these loci are locked into a wing patterning supergene that results in a lack of recombination and a finite set of wing pattern morphs. More recent studies have found ancient introgressions between H. erato and H. melpomene that have suggested greater amounts of introgression than previously believed.

One puzzle with Müllerian mimicry/convergence is that it would be predicted the butterflies to all eventually converge on the same color and pattern for the highest predator education. Instead, Heliconius butterflies are greatly diverse and even form multiple 'mimicry rings' within the same geographical area. Additional evolutionary forces are likely at work. Studies into predator psychology have suggested that traditional models of mimicry do not properly account for the fluctuating nature of predator learning and forgetting mimic patterns.

=== Speciation ===
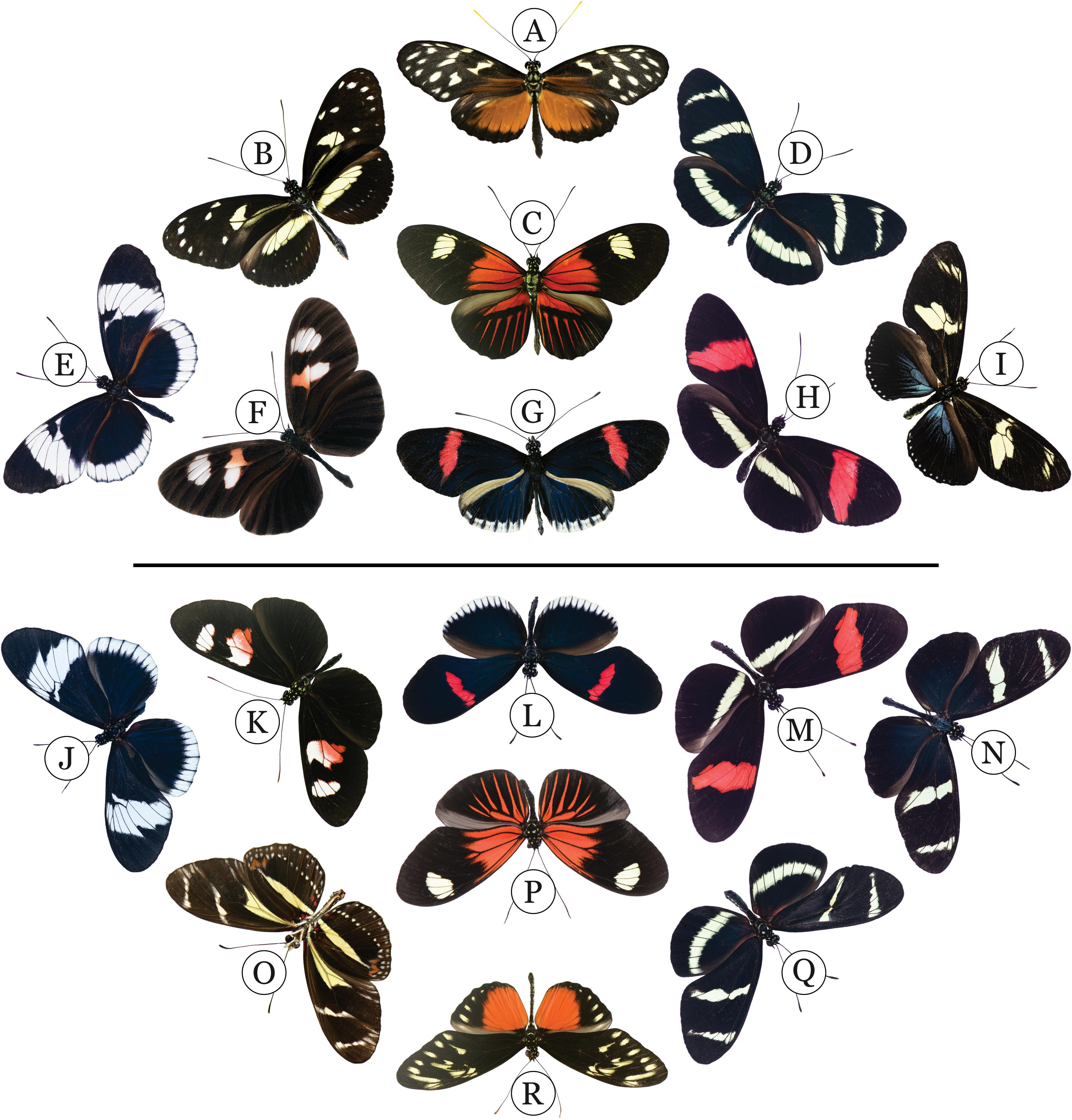
Wing pattern mimicry among various Heliconius species.

Heliconius butterflies are models for the study of speciation. Hybrid speciation has been hypothesized to occur in this genus and may contribute to the diverse mimicry found in Heliconius butterflies. It has been proposed that two closely related species, H. cydno and H. melpomene, hybridized to create the species H. heurippa. In addition, the clade containing Heliconius erato radiated before Heliconius melpomene, establishing the wing pattern diversity found in both species of butterfly. In a DNA sequencing comparison involving species H. m. aglope, H. timareta, and H. m. amaryllis, it was found that gene sequences around mimicry loci were more recently diverged in comparison with the rest of the genome, providing evidence for speciation by hybridization over speciation by ancestral polymorphism.

Hybridization is correlated with introgression. Results from Supple and her team have shown SNP's being polymorphic mostly around hybrid zones of a genome, and they claimed this supported the mechanism of introgression over ancestral variation for genetic material exchange for certain species. Selection factors can drive introgression to revolve around genes correlated with wing pattern and color. Research has shown introgression centering on two known chromosomes that contain mimicry alleles.

Assortive mating reproductively isolates H. heurippa from its parental species. Melo did a study on the hybrid H. heurippa to determine its mating habits regarding preference between other hybrids and its parental species. The results showed H. heurippa chose to reproduce via backcrossing, while the parental species were highly unlikely to reproduce with the backcrosses. This is significant, because hybrids' mating behavior would relatively quickly isolate itself from its parental species, and eventually form a species itself, as defined by lack of gene flow. His team also hypothesized that along with a mixed inheritance of color and pattern, the hybrids also obtained a mixed preference for mates from their parental species genes. The H. heurippa likely had a genetic attraction for other hybrids, leading to its reproductive isolation and speciation.

Heliconius butterflies provide examples of a probably rare form of speciation, homoploid hybrid speciation, i.e. hybridization without changing the number of chromosomes. For various reasons, while it remains a good example of introgression of a color trait involved in mating from H. melpomene, H. heurippa is no longer regarded as a good example of hybrid speciation ; the problem is that H. heurippa is today regarded as little more than a local form of the more widespread H. timareta, which occurs along the eastern slopes of the Andes between Colombia and Peru and whose divergent populations also have many other examples of different color pattern introgression from different geographic forms of H. melpomene. It is unlikely that H. heurippa is reproductively isolated enough from its "H. timareta" parent to warrant status as a species in its own right.

However, at least two more recent excellent examples of homoploid hybrid speciation have cropped up in Heliconius. Firstly, H. hecalesia is almost certainly an ancient hybrid species between H. telesiphe (+ H. clysonymus + H. hortense) and the H. erato + H. himera lineages. A more recent case is Heliconius elevatus, which has been shown to be a hybrid species between H. melpomene and H. pardalinus.

=== Sexual selection of aposematic colors ===
Aposematism, using warning colors, has been noted to improve species diversification, which may also contribute to the wide range of Heliconius butterflies.

For aposematism and mimicry to be successful in the butterflies, they must continually evolve their colours to warn predators of their unpalatability. Sexual selection is important in maintaining aposematism, as it helps to select for specific shades of colours rather than general colors. A research team used techniques to determine some the color qualities of a set of butterflies. They found that color was more vivid on the dorsal side of the butterflies than on the ventral. Also, in comparing the sexes, females appeared to have differing brightness in specific spots. It is important to select for specific colors to avoid subtle shades in any of the species involved in the mimicry. Unsuccessful warning colors will reduce the efficiency of the aposematism. To select for specific colours, neural receptors in the butterflies' brains give a disproportionate recognition and selection to those shades. To test the importance of these neural and visual cues in the butterflies, researchers conducted an experiment wherein they eliminated colours from butterflies' wings. When a colour was eliminated, the butterfly was less successful in attracting mates, and therefore did not reproduce as much as its counterparts.

=== Sexual selection of pheromones ===
In order to attract mates female Heliconius secrete pheromones from a yellow like sac that they secrete the scent to appear more attractive to the males. They found that typically it is virgin female Heliconius that secrete these pheromones, The males are able to attach themselves using their denticles to these secretion sacs during mating in order to ensure secretion. Pheromones are vital when it comes to mate choice it determines the more likely chance that there will be a success in mating between the Heliconius. There is a reproductive isolation between populations so while mates are attracted by pheromones they still will choose to similar patterned winged Heliconius.

=== Mating and offspring ===
Heliconius has evolved two forms of mating. The main form is standard sexual reproduction. Some species of Heliconius, however, have converged evolutionarily in regard to pupal mating. One species to exhibit this behavior is Heliconius charithonia. In this form of mating, the male Heliconius finds a female pupa and waits until a day before she is moulted to mate with her. With this type of mating there is no sexual selection present. H. erato has a unique mating ritual, in which males transfer anti-aphrodisiac pheromones to females after copulation so that no other males will approach the mated females. No other Lepidoptera exhibit this behavior.

Heliconius female butterflies also disperse their eggs much more slowly than other species of butterflies. They obtain their nutrients for egg production through consumption of pollen in the adult stage rather than the larval stage. Due to nutrient collection in the adult rather than larval stage, adult females have a much longer life than other species, which allows them to better disperse their eggs for survival and speciation. This form of egg production is helpful because larvae are much more vulnerable than adult stages, although they also use aposematism. Because many of the nutrients needed to produce eggs are obtained in the adult stage, the larval stage is much shorter and less susceptible to predation.

== Cyanogenic glycosides as a defence ==
In order to be unpalatable, the Heliconius butterflies use cyanogenic characteristics, meaning they produce substances that have a cyanide group attached to them, ultimately making them harmful. Research has found that the amino acids needed to make the cyanic compounds come from feeding on pollen. Although feeding on pollen takes longer than nectar feeding, the aposematic characteristics help to warn predators away and give them more time for feeding. While Heliconius larvae feed on Passifloraceae which also have cyanogenic characteristics, the larvae have evolved the ability to neutralize cyanic molecules to protect them from the negative effects of the plant.

== Species ==
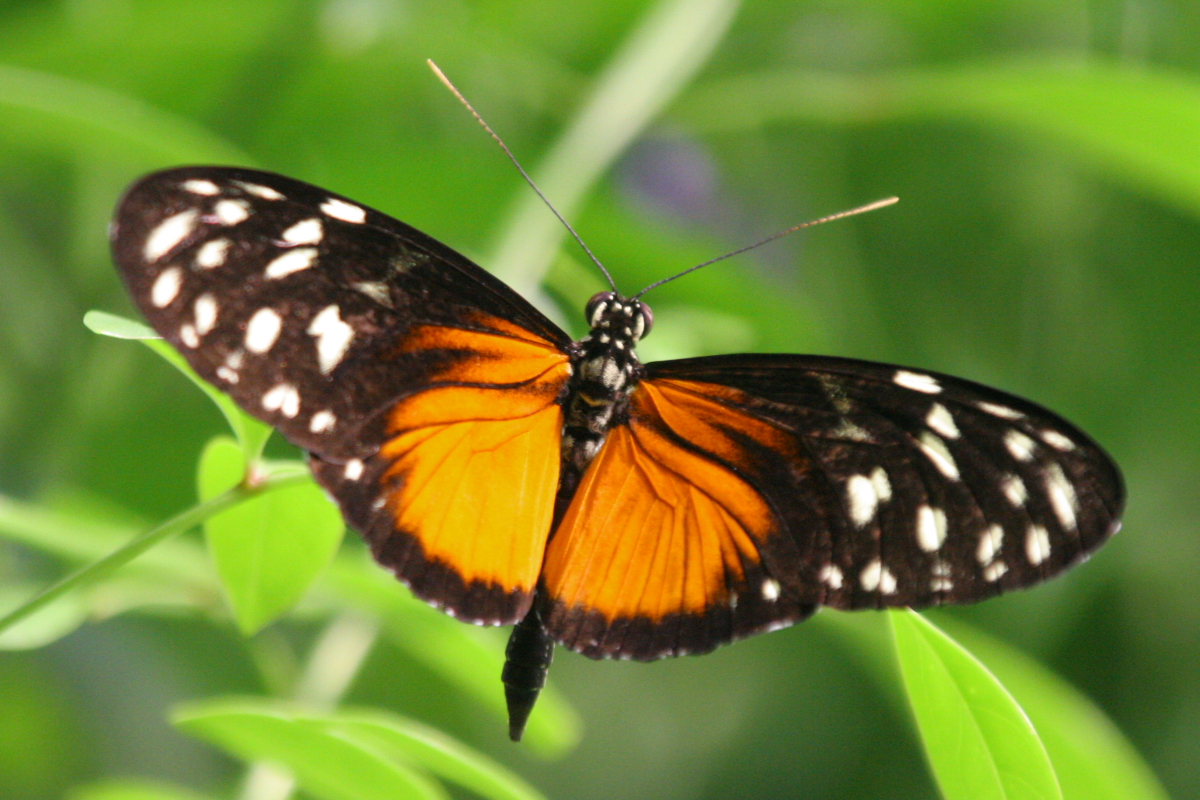
Tiger longwing (Heliconius hecale)

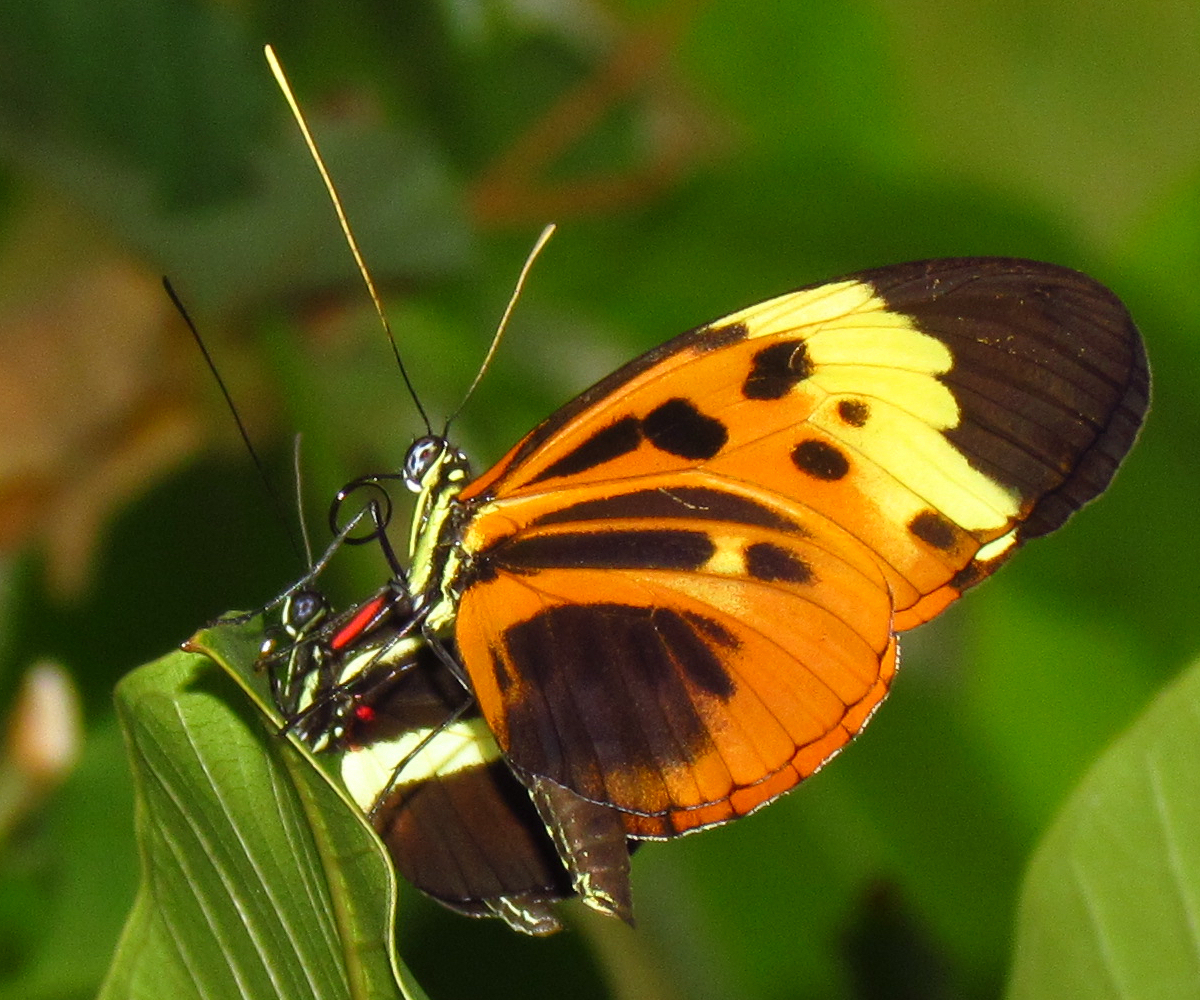
Numata longwing (Heliconius numata)

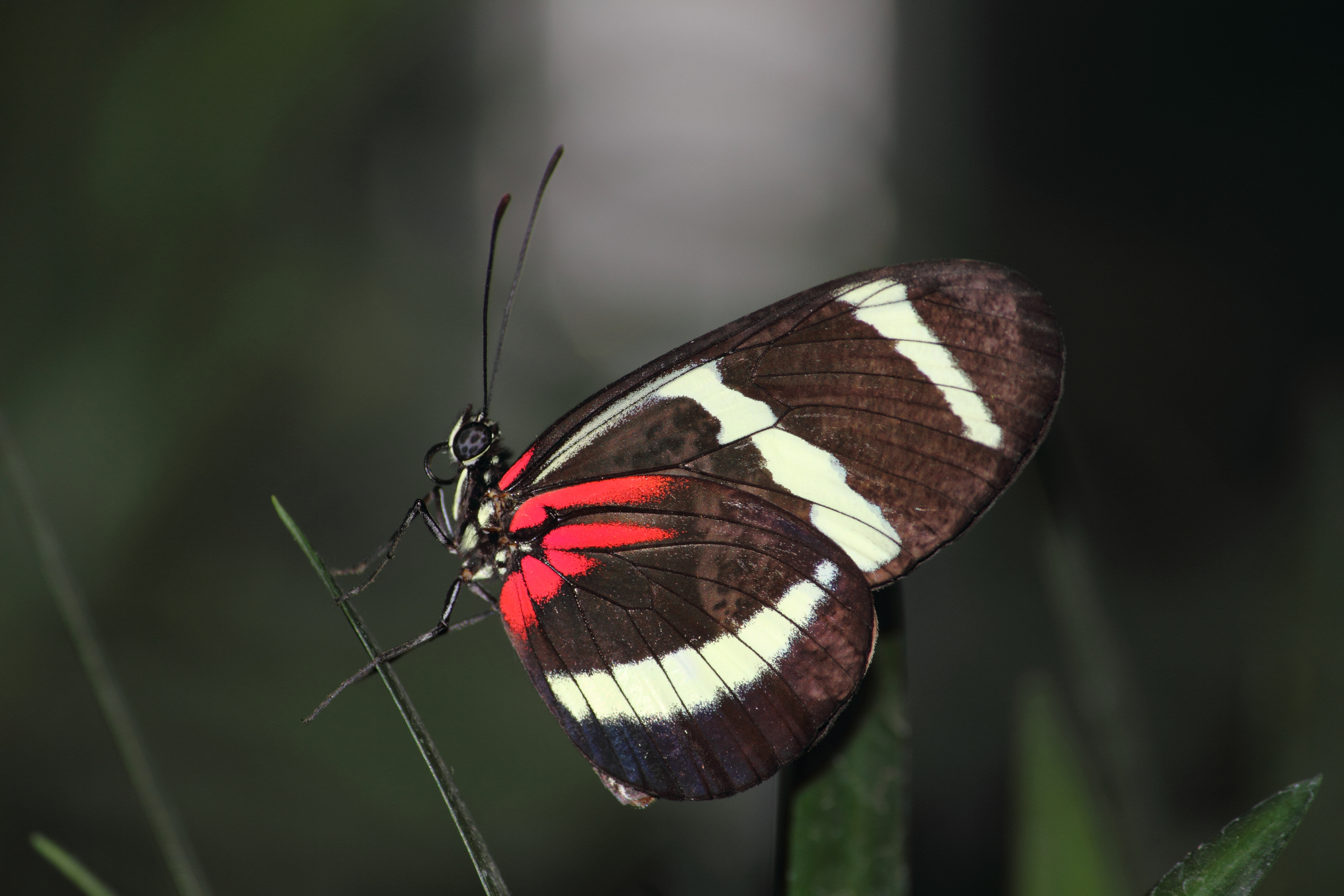
Heliconius hewitsoni

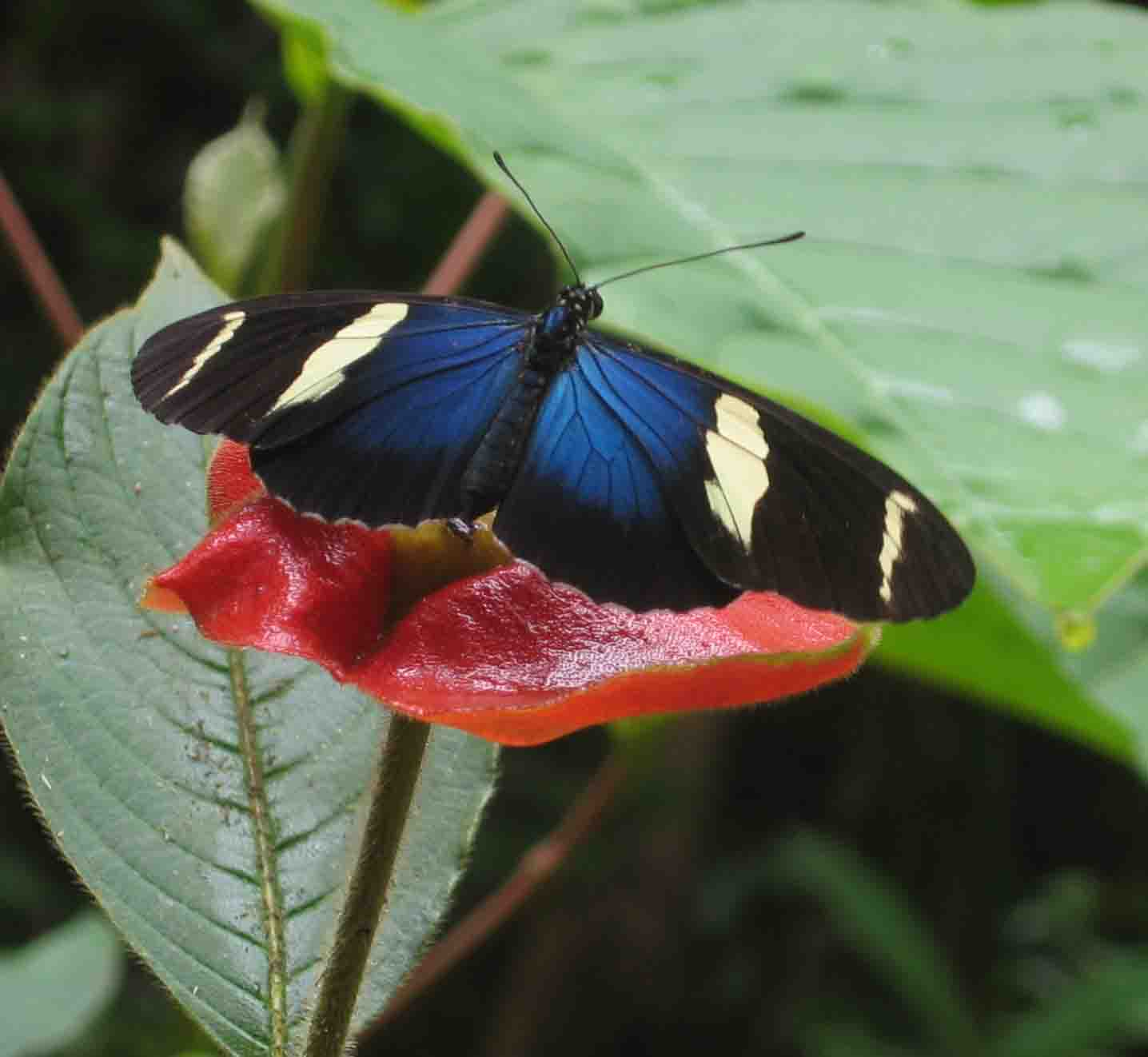
Sara longwing (Heliconius sara)

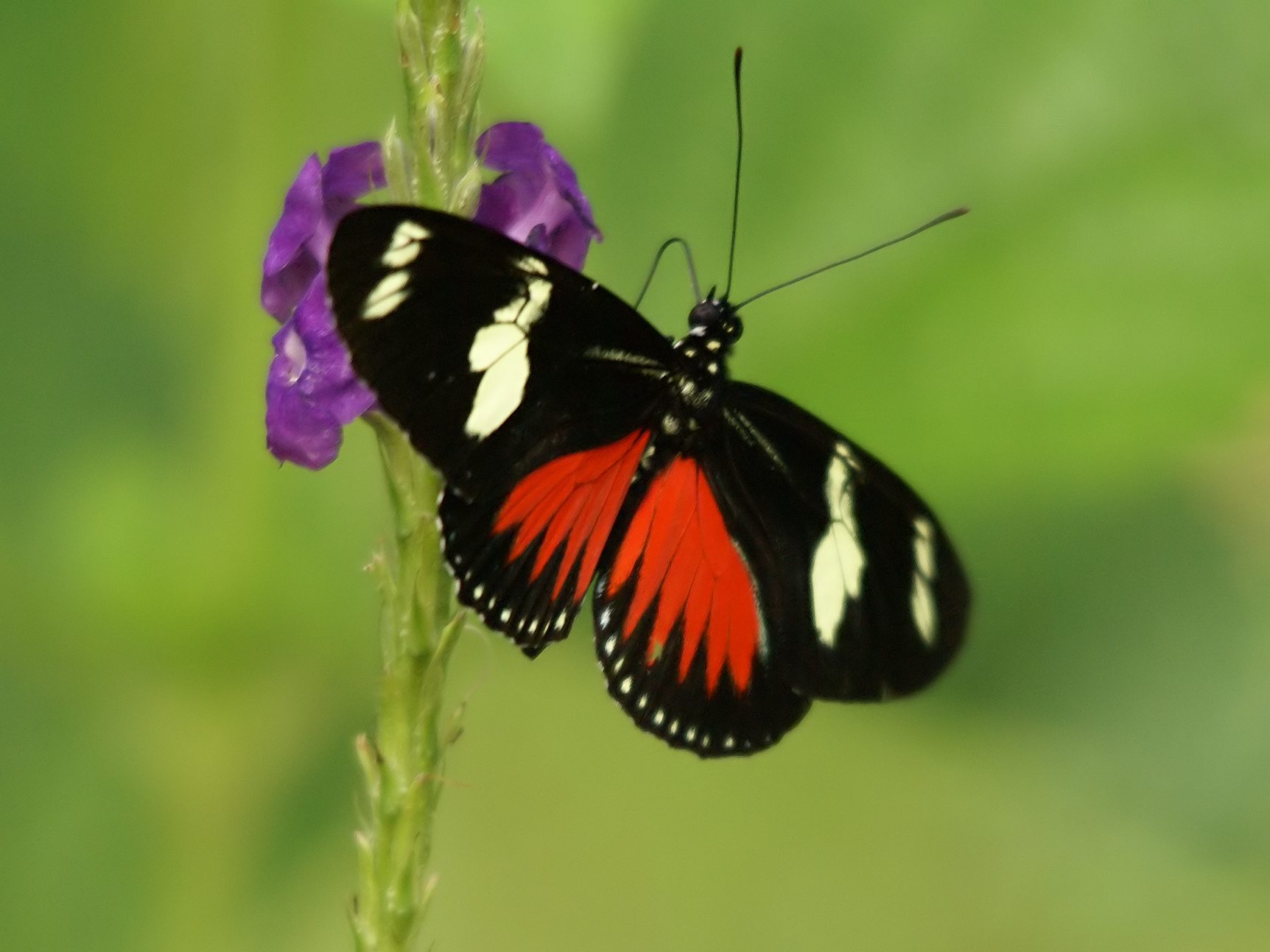
Doris longwing (Heliconius doris)

Most current researchers agree that there are some 45-50 Heliconius species. These are listed alphabetically here, according to Gerardo Lamas' (2017) updated checklist. Note that the subspecific nomenclature is incomplete for many species (there are over 2000 published names associated with the genus, many of which are subjective synonyms or infrasubspecific names). Additional useful images of these butterflies, largely correctly identified to subspecies, can be found in various websites.

- Heliconius Kluk, 1802

- Heliconius antiochus (Linnaeus, 1767) – Antiochus longwing
- Heliconius aoede (Hübner, [1813]) – Aoede longwing
- Heliconius astraea Staudinger, 1897
- Heliconius atthis Doubleday, 1847 – Atthis longwing or false zebra longwing
- Heliconius besckei Ménétriés, 1857
- Heliconius burneyi (Hübner, 1816) – Burney's longwing
- Heliconius charithonia (Linnaeus, 1767) – zebra longwing
- Heliconius chestertonii (Hewitson, 1872)
- Heliconius clysonymus Latreille, 1817 – Clysonymus longwing, montane longwing
- Heliconius congener Weymer, 1890
- Heliconius cydno (Doubleday, 1847) – cydno longwing
- Heliconius demeter Staudinger, 1897 – Demeter longwing
- Heliconius doris (Linnaeus, 1771) – Doris longwing or Doris
- Heliconius egeria (Cramer, 1775)
- Heliconius eleuchia Hewitson, 1853 – white-edged longwing or eleuchia longwing
- Heliconius elevatus Nöldner, 1901
- Heliconius erato (Linnaeus, 1764) – crimson-patched longwing, red postman
- Heliconius eratosignis (Joicey & Talbot, 1925)
- Heliconius ethilla (Godart, 1819) – Ethilla longwing
- Heliconius godmani Staudinger, 1882
- Heliconius hecale (Fabricius, 1775) – tiger longwing or Hecale longwing
- Heliconius hecalesia Hewitson, 1853 – five-spotted longwing
- Heliconius hecuba (Hewitson, [1858]) – Hecuba longwing
- Heliconius hermathena (Hewitson, 1853) – Hermathena longwing
- Heliconius heurippa (Hewitson, 1853)
- Heliconius hewitsoni Staudinger, 1875
- Heliconius hierax Hewitson, 1869
- Heliconius himera Hewitson, 1867
- Heliconius hortense Guérin, [1844] – Mexican longwing or mountain longwing
- Heliconius ismenius Latreille, [1817] – Ismenius tiger or tiger helconian
- Heliconius lalitae Brévignon, 1996
- Heliconius leucadia (Bates, 1862) – Leucadia longwing
- Heliconius luciana Lichy, 1960
- Heliconius melpomene (Linnaeus, 1758) – (common) postman
- Heliconius metharme (Erichson, [1849])
- Heliconius metis (Moreira & Mielke, 2010)
- Heliconius nattereri Felder, 1865 – Natterer's longwing
- Heliconius numata (Cramer, 1780) – Numata longwing
- Heliconius pachinus Salvin, 1871 – pachinus longwing
- Heliconius pardalinus (Bates, 1862)
- Heliconius peruvianus (C. & R. Felder, 1859) – Peruvian longwing
- Heliconius ricini (Linnaeus, 1758) – ricini longwing
- Heliconius sapho (Drury, 1782) – Sapho longwing
- Heliconius sara (Fabricius, 1793) – Sara longwing
- Heliconius telesiphe Doubleday, 1847 – telesiphe longwing
- Heliconius timareta (Hewitson, 1867)
- Heliconius wallacei Reakirt, 1866 – Wallace's longwing
- Heliconius xanthocles Bates, 1862
