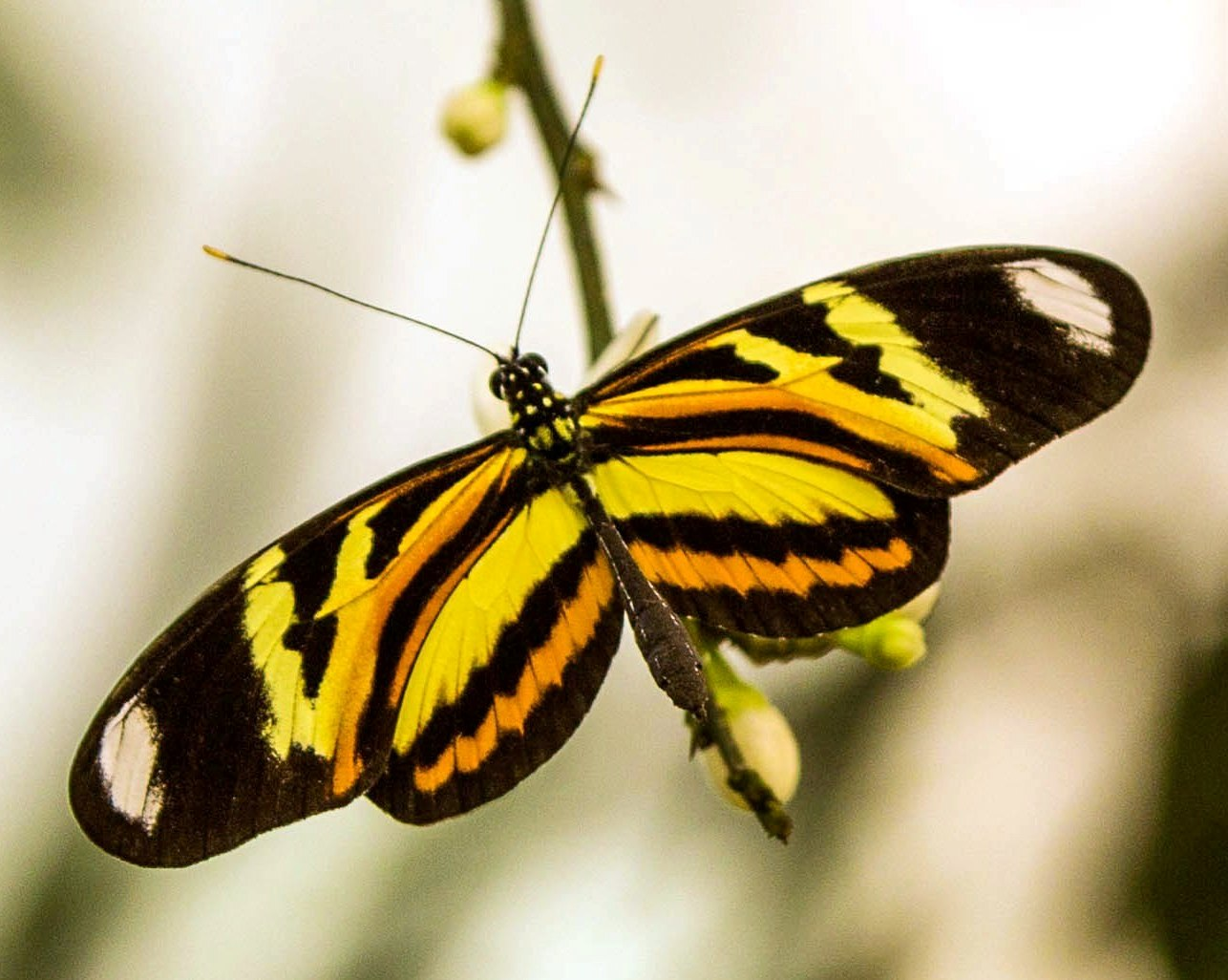

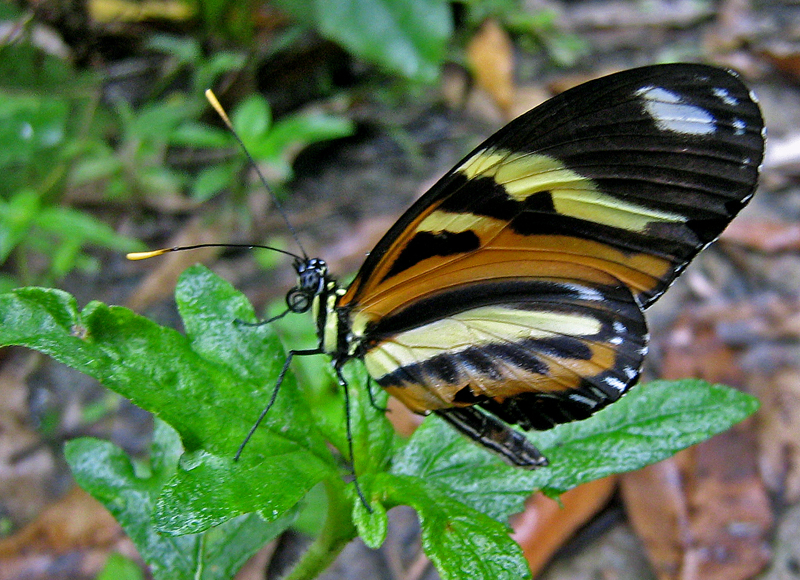
- Heliconius ethilla narcaea

Scientific classification
- Domain: Eukaryota
- Kingdom: Animalia
- Phylum: Arthropoda
- Class: Insecta
- Order: Lepidoptera
- Family: Nymphalidae
- Genus: Heliconius
- Species: H. ethilla

Binomial name
- Heliconius ethilla (Godart, 1819)
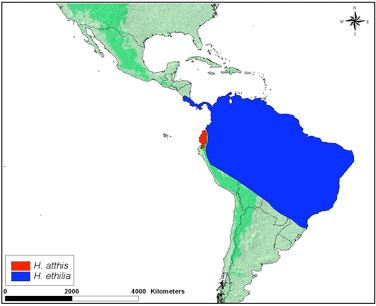
- Range in blue

Synonyms
- Heliconius metalilis var. flavidus Weymer, 1894; Heliconius ethilla metalilis f. depuncta Boullet & Le Cerf, 1909; Heliconia narcaea Godart, 1819; Mechanites ecrate Hübner, [1823]; Heliconius satis Weymer, 1875; Heliconius eucrate var. infuscata Staudinger, 1885; Heliconius narcaea ab. brunnescens Neustetter, 1907; Heliconius connexa Seitz, 1912; Eueides eucoma Hübner, [1831]; Eueides eucoma Hübner, 1816; Heliconius cephallenia C. & R. Felder, [1865]; Heliconius polychrous C. & R. Felder, [1865]; Heliconius physcoa Seitz, 1912; Heliconius metalilis Butler, 1873; Heliconius claudia Godman & Salvin, [1881]; Heliconius assimilis Röber, 1921; Heliconius mentor Weymer, 1883; Heliconius orchamus Weymer, 1912; Heliconius eucoma var. flavofasciatus Weymer, 1894; Heliconius narcaea var. flavomaculatus Weymer, 1894; Heliconius eucoma var. numismaticus Weymer, 1894; Heliconius metalilis var. semiflavidus Weymer, 1894; Heliconius eucoma var. daguanus Staudinger, [1897]; Heliconius eucoma var. juntana Riffarth, 1900; Heliconius tyndarus Weymer, 1897; Heliconius gradatus thielei Riffarth, 1900; Heliconius numatus isabellinus ab. fusca Boullet & Le Cerf, 1909; Heliconius quitalinus nebulosa Kaye, 1916; Heliconius aurotome f. clarus Michael, 1926 (preocc. Fabricius, 1793)

= Heliconius ethilla =

Ethilia longwing

Species of butterfly

Heliconius ethilla, the ethilia longwing, is a butterfly of the family Nymphalidae. It was described by Jean-Baptiste Godart in 1819. It is found from Panama to southern Brazil. The habitat consists of marginal forests.

The wingspan is 60–70 mm. The forewings are orange with a black margin and four black spots. The hindwings are orange with two black stripes.

The larvae feed on Passiflora species. Full-grown larvae have a white body with an orange head and reach a length of about 17 mm.

== Subspecies ==
- H. e. ethilla (Trinidad)
- H. e. adela Neustetter, 1912 (Peru)
- H. e. aerotome C. & R. Felder, 1862 (Brazil: Amazonas)
- H. e. cephallenia C. & R. Felder, [1865] (Surinam)
- H. e. chapadensis Brown, 1973 (Brazil: Mato Grosso)
- H. e. claudia Godman & Salvin, 1881 (Panama)
- H. e. eucoma (Hübner, [1831]) (Peru to Panama)
- H. e. flavofasciatus Weymer, 1894 (Brazil: Pará)
- H. e. flavomaculatus Weymer, 1894 (Brazil: Pernambuco)
- H. e. hyalina Neustetter, 1928 (Brazil: Roraima)
- H. e. jaruensis Brown, 1976 (Brazil: Rondônia)
- H. e. latona Neukirchen, 1998 (Colombia)
- H. e. mentor Weymer, 1883 (Colombia)
- H. e. metalilis Butler, 1873 (Venezuela)
- H. e. michaelianius Lamas, 1988 (Peru)
- H. e. narcaea Godart, 1819 (Brazil: Rio de Janeiro)
- H. e. nebulosa Kaye, 1916 (Peru)
- H. e. neukircheni Lamas, 1998 (Peru)
- H. e. numismaticus Weymer, 1894 (Brazil: Pará)
- H. e. penthesilea Neukirchen, 1994 (Brazil: Amazonas)
- H. e. polychrous C. & R. Felder, [1865] (Brazil: São Paulo)
- H. e. semiflavidus Weymer, 1894 (Colombia)
- H. e. thielei Riffarth, 1900 (French Guiana)
- H. e. tyndarus Weymer, 1897 (Bolivia)
- H. e. yuruani Brown & Fernández, 1985 (Venezuela)
