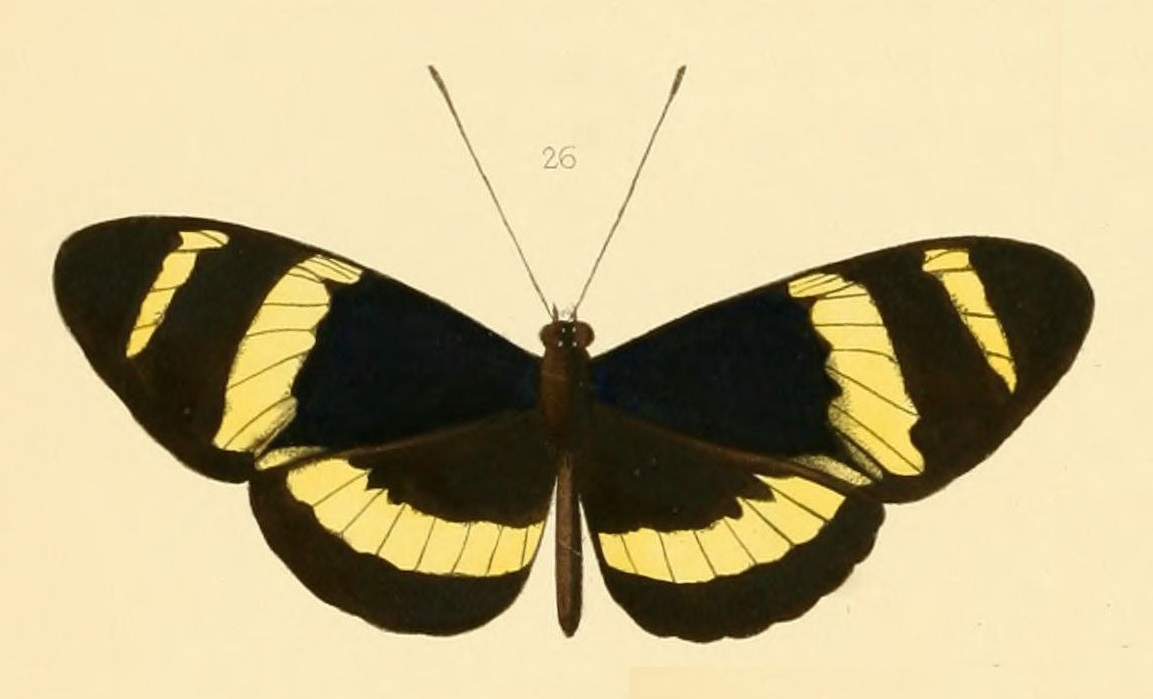
- Heliconius pachinus in Hewitson, 1875, "Heliconia VIII" fig. 26.

Scientific classification
- Domain: Eukaryota
- Kingdom: Animalia
- Phylum: Arthropoda
- Class: Insecta
- Order: Lepidoptera
- Family: Nymphalidae
- Genus: Heliconius
- Species: H. pachinus

Binomial name
- Heliconius pachinus Salvin, 1871

= Heliconius pachinus =

Species of butterfly

Heliconius pachinus, the pachinus longwing, is a butterfly of the family Nymphalidae native to Central America.

== Distribution ==
Heliconius pachinus occurs in Costa Rica and Panama.
