= Spirogyra Butterfly Farm Park Garden =

Costa Rican visitor attraction

- Interactive map of Spirogyra Butterfly Farm Park Garden
- 9.9400494°N 84.0727499°W
- Location: San Jose Province, Costa Rica
- No. of species: 50–60
- Website: www.butterflygardencr.com

The Spirogyra Butterfly Farm Park Garden, (Spanish: Mariposario Spirogyra), located in San Francisco de Goicoechea, on the edge of Rio Torres, north of Zoológico Simón Bolívar, in Barrio Amon, Carmen District, San José, Costa Rica, is a butterfly house that houses from 50 to 60 different species of live butterflies from around the country in a climate-controlled, glass-enclosed habitat.

The conservatory includes flowering plants, cascading waterfalls and trees. There are also several species of free flying "butterfly friendly" birds.

There is a learning center, where guests can get a close up view of a variety of live caterpillars feeding and developing on their host plants. Spirogyra Garden also works with different groups of women from rural areas of Costa Rica find alternative sources of income from field labor cultivating butterflies near forests for export.

== Species ==
Butterfly species in display at Spirogyra Butterfly Garden include:

- Heliconiinae: Heliconius erato, Heliconius charithonia (zebra heliconian), Heliconius hecale and Heliconius cydno
- Swallowtail butterflies: Parides iphidamas and Parides photinus
- Owl butterflies: Caligo memnon, Caligo eurilochus, and Caligo atreus
- Pieridae: Phoebis sennae
- Morpho peleides
- Eurytides (edible)

== Gallery ==
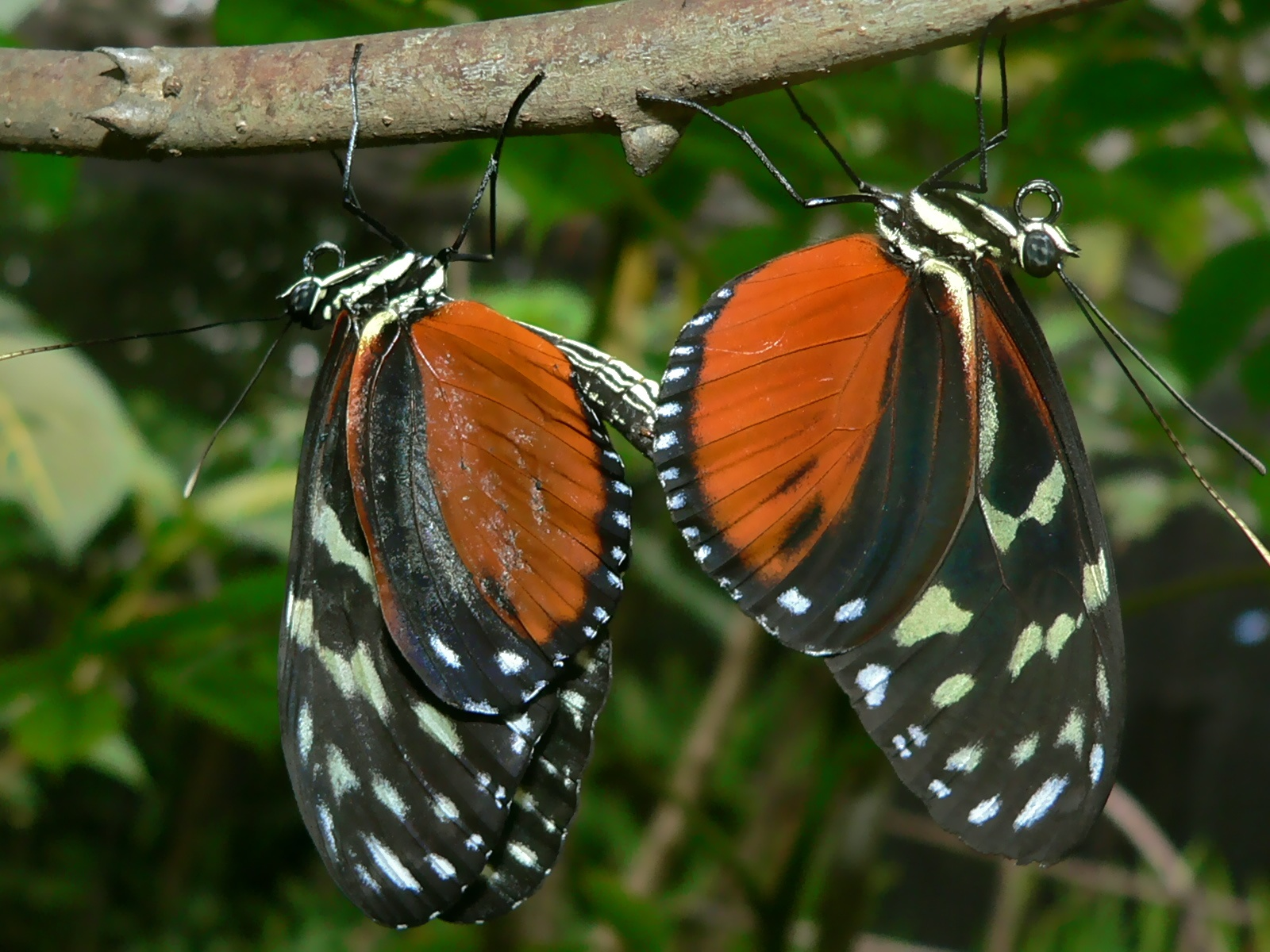
Tiger Longwings (Heliconius hecale zuleika) mating

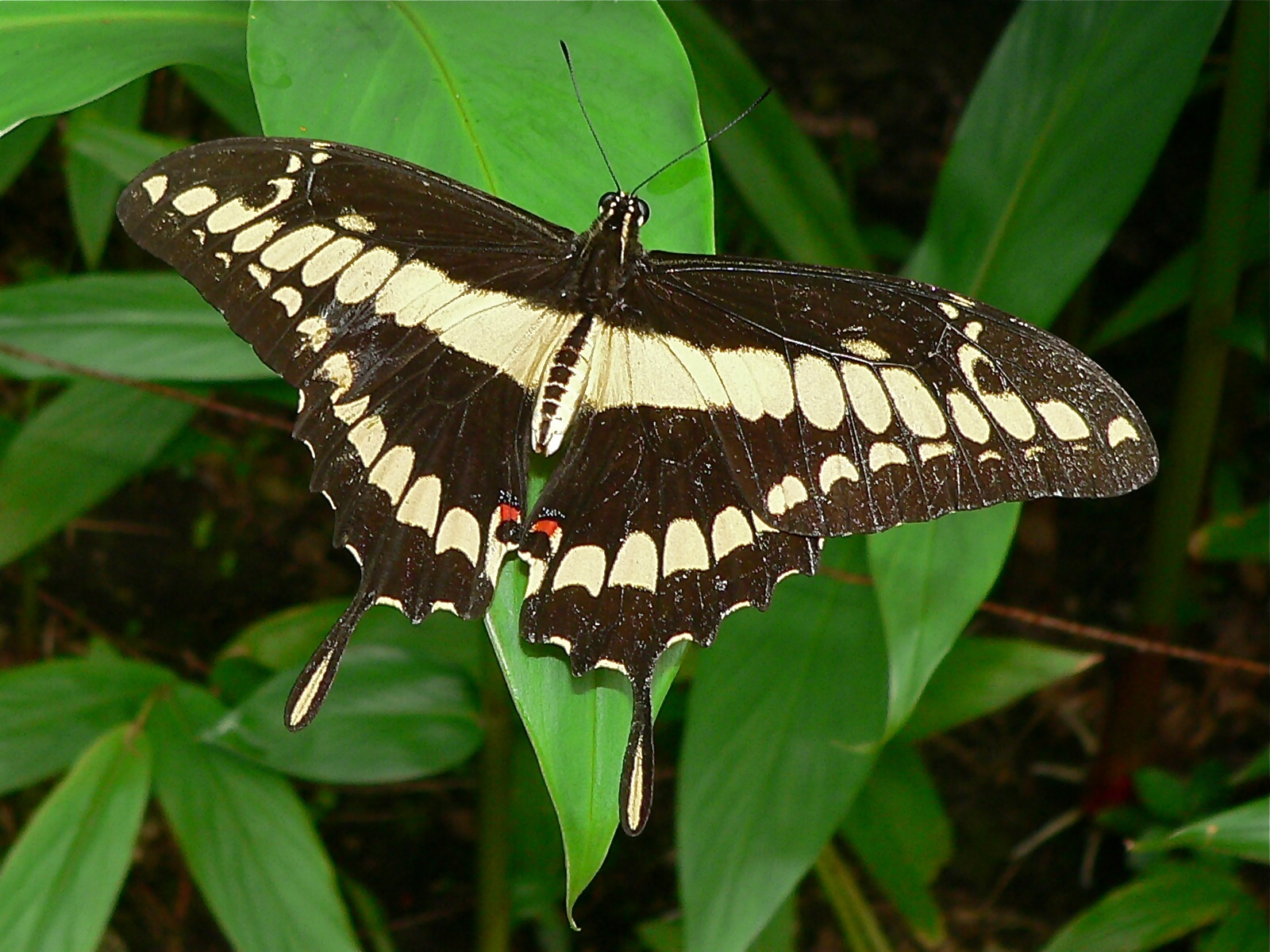
King Swallowtail (Papilio thoas nealces)

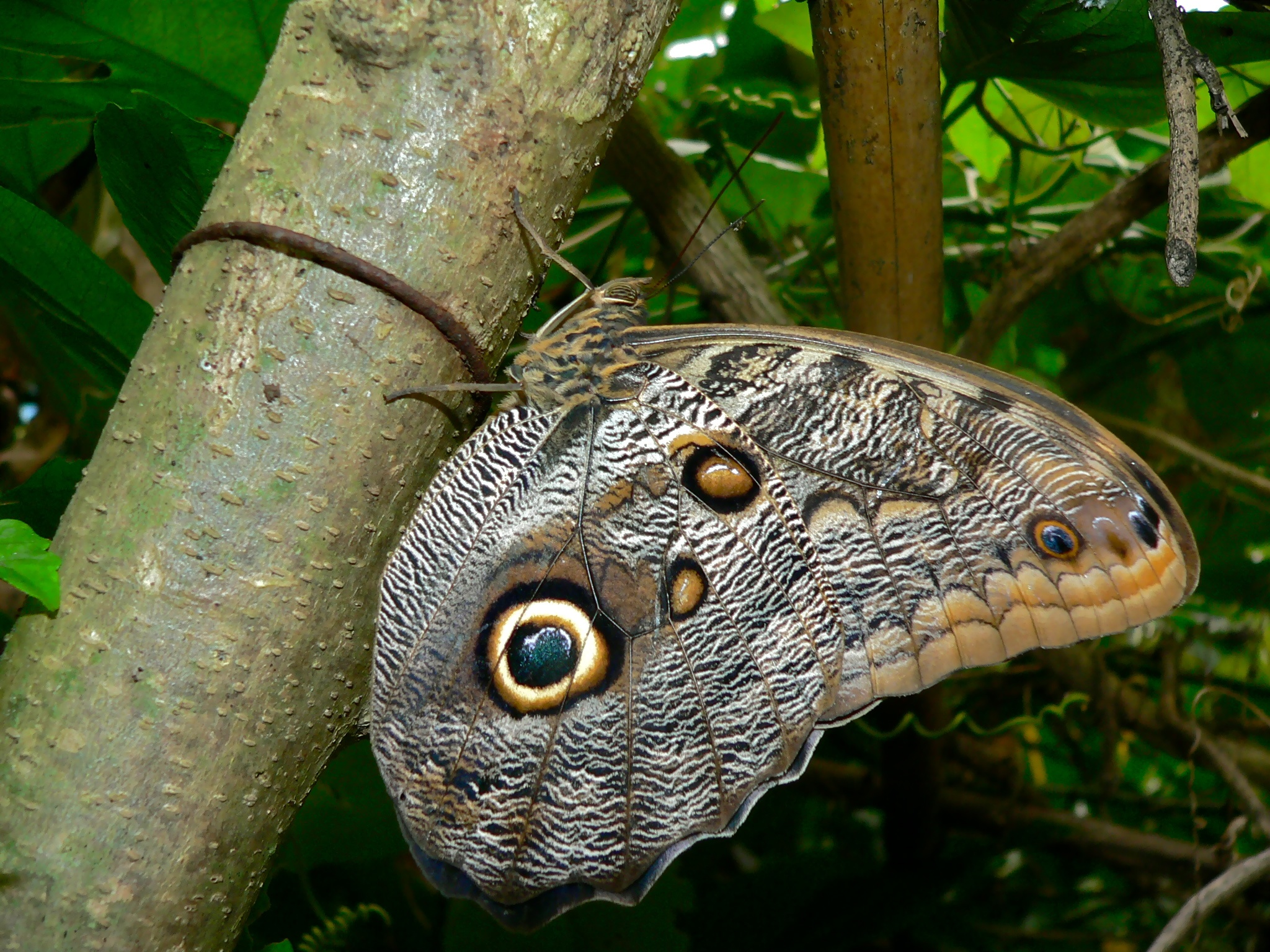
Owl butterfly (Caligo memnon)

== See also ==
- List of zoos by country: Costa Rica zoos
