= Spirogyra (disambiguation) =

Spirogyra is a genus of algae.

Spirogyra may also refer to:

- Spirogyra (band), a British folk/prog rock band
- Spyro Gyra, an American jazz fusion band
- Spirogyra Lake, a lake in the South Orkney islands
- Spirogyra Butterfly Garden, a Costa Rican lepidopterarium
