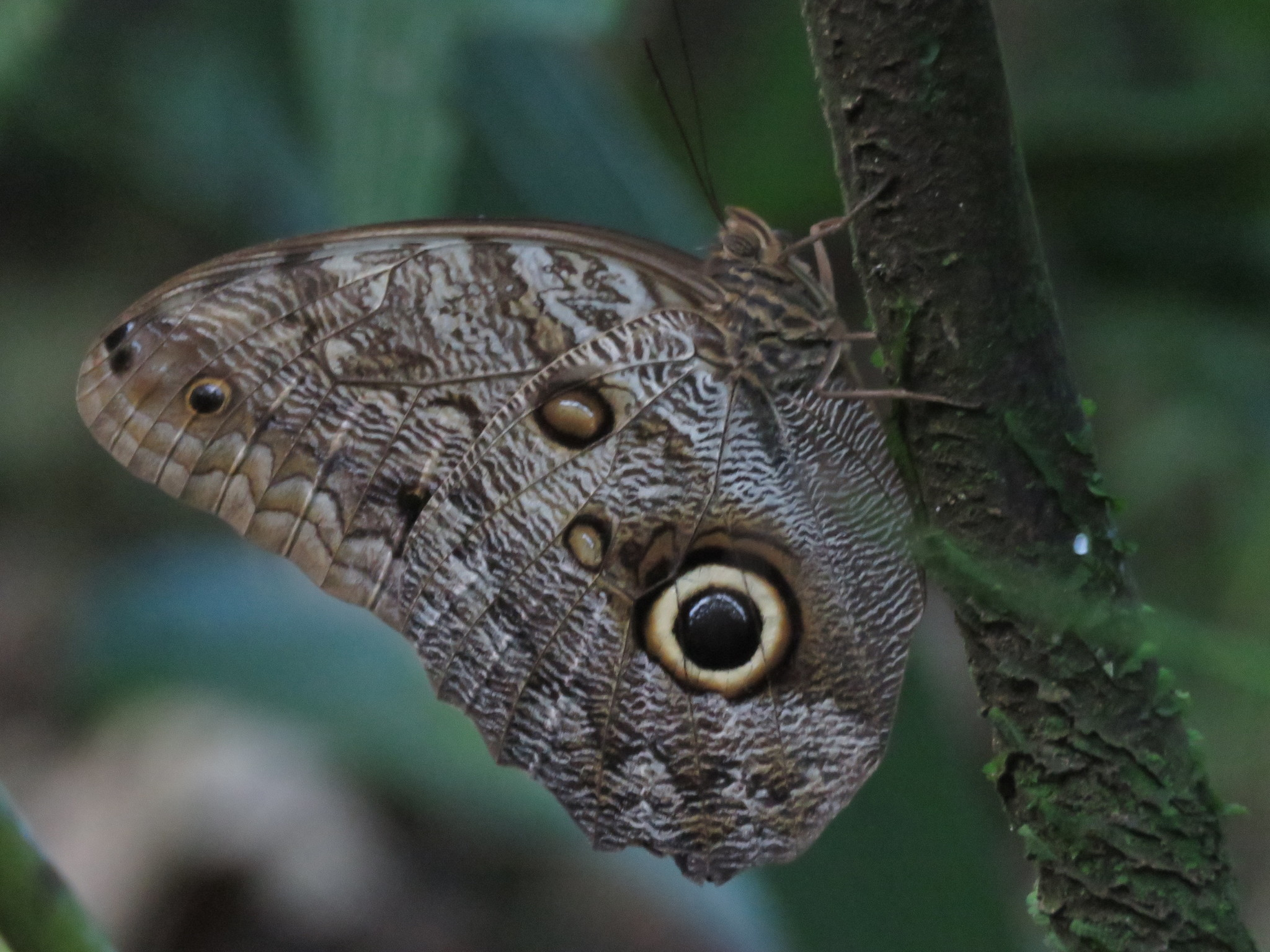

Scientific classification
- Domain: Eukaryota
- Kingdom: Animalia
- Phylum: Arthropoda
- Class: Insecta
- Order: Lepidoptera
- Family: Nymphalidae
- Subfamily: Satyrinae
- Tribe: Brassolini
- Genus: Caligo
- Species: C. telamonius

Binomial name
- Caligo telamonius (C. Felder & R. Felder, 1862)

Synonyms
- Pavonia telamonius C. Felder & R. Felder, 1862

= Caligo telamonius =

Species of butterfly

Caligo telamonius is a brush-footed butterfly (family Nymphalidae). The species was first described by Cajetan von Felder and Rudolf Felder in 1862. It is found in southern North America, Central America, and South America.

== Subspecies ==
Two subspecies belong to the species Caligo telamonius:

- Caligo telamonius memnon
- Caligo telamonius menus
