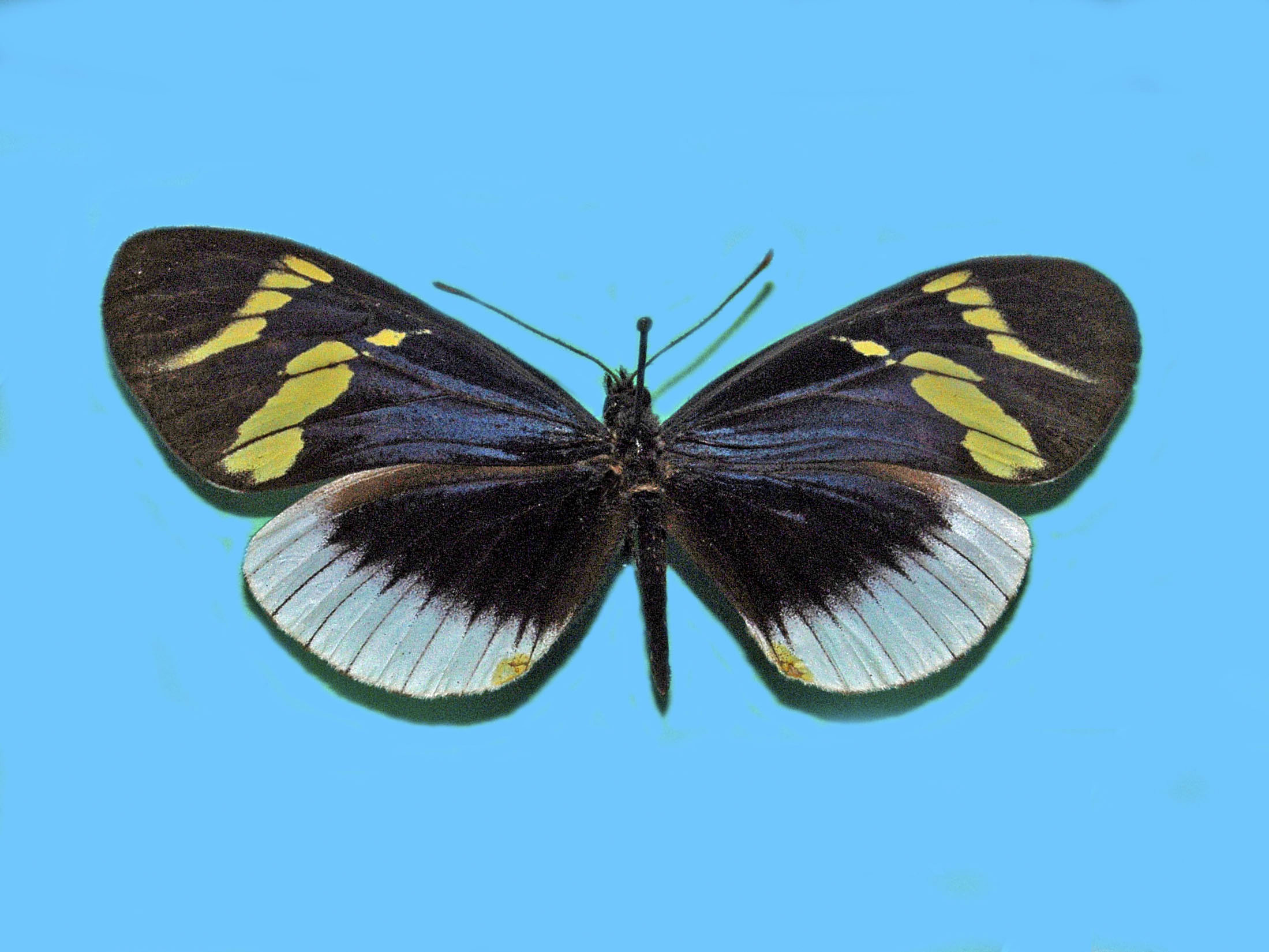
- Museum specimen

Scientific classification
- Domain: Eukaryota
- Kingdom: Animalia
- Phylum: Arthropoda
- Class: Insecta
- Order: Lepidoptera
- Family: Nymphalidae
- Genus: Heliconius
- Species: H. eleuchia

Binomial name
- Heliconius eleuchia Hewitson, 1853

Synonyms
- Heliconius primularis Butler, 1869; Heliconius sapho primularis ab. deflava Joicey & Kaye, 1917; Heliconius ceres Oberthür, 1920; Heliconius primularis ceres Stichel, 1923 (preocc. Oberthür, 1920)

= Heliconius eleuchia =

Species of butterfly

Heliconius eleuchia, the white-edged longwing, is a species of Heliconius butterfly described by William Chapman Hewitson in 1853.

== Subspecies ==
Subspecies include:

- Heliconius eleuchia eleuchia - present in Costa Rica and in Colombia
- Heliconius eleuchia eleusinus Staudinger, 1885 - present in Ecuador
- Heliconius eleuchia primularis Butler, 1869 - present in C. in Ecuador

== Distribution and habitat ==
This species is present Costa Rica, Colombia and Ecuador. It occurs in the riparian forest at an elevation up to 2,000 metres (6,600 ft) above sea level.

== Description ==
The wingspan of Heliconius eleuchia can reach about 86 millimetres (3.4 in). These large butterflies have a slender body and long elongated front wings with a slightly concave inner edge. The basal half of the both wings is navy blue. Forewings are crossed by two yellow bands with irregular edges, running from the costal nervure to the inner angle and separating the apex from the rest of the wing. Hindwings have a large submarginal white area, crossed by black nervure. The underside presents the same ornamentation, but the forewings show a line of scarlet at the base and the hindwings have some scarlet spots in the basal area.

== Biology ==
Caterpillars feed on Passiflora macrophyllum (Passifloraceae). The males rest on females' pupae before emergence, and mating occurs the next morning.

=== Müllerian mimicry ===
H. eleuchia engages in Müllerian mimicry with H. cydno, specifically in Ecuador. For this type of mimicry, species adopt one another's warning signals. In this case, coloring is used to warn a predator of the unpleasant taste of their intended prey. For instance, the subspecies H. cydno alithea has two potential colorings, one of which mimics the coloring of H. eleuchia.

== Bibliography ==
- Brown, K. S. 1981 The Biology of Heliconius and Related Genera. Annual Review of Entomology 26, 427-456.
- Hewitson, W. C. 1854 Illustrations of New Species of Exotic Butterflies: Selected Chiefly from the Collections of W. Wilson Saunders and William C. Hewitson. London, John Van Voorst.
