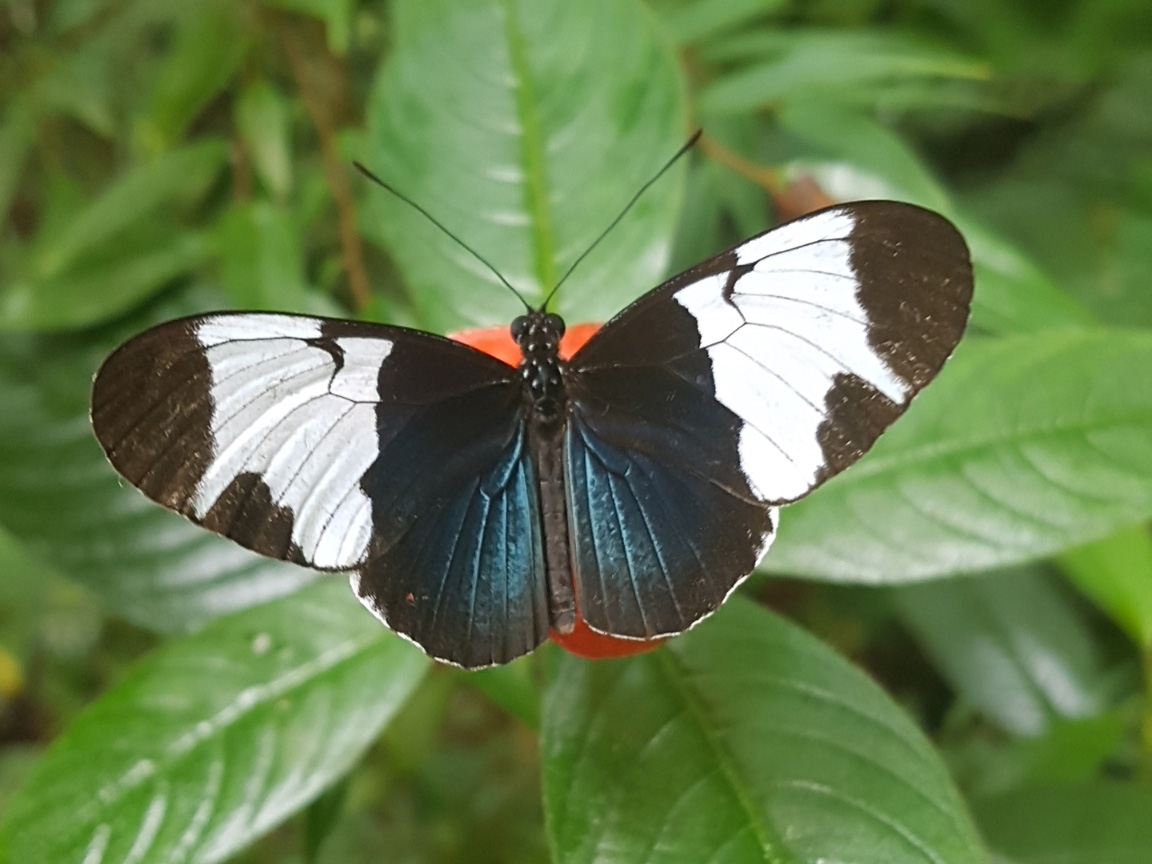
- H. s. leuce

Scientific classification
- Domain: Eukaryota
- Kingdom: Animalia
- Phylum: Arthropoda
- Class: Insecta
- Order: Lepidoptera
- Family: Nymphalidae
- Genus: Heliconius
- Species: H. sapho

Binomial name
- Heliconius sapho (Drury, 1782)

Synonyms
- Papilio sapho Drury, 1782; Heliconius sappho [sic] Westwood, 1837; Heliconia leuce Doubleday, 1847; Heliconia hewitsoni Hewitson, 1875

= Heliconius sapho =

Sapho longwing

Species of butterfly

Heliconius sapho, the Sapho longwing, is a butterfly of the family Nymphalidae. It was described by Dru Drury in 1782. It is found from Mexico southward to Ecuador.

== Name ==
Drury left no notes on the origin of the name, but the spelling (and the naming conventions of the time) suggests it derives from the mythological Queen Sapho, not the historical poet Sappho. Subsequent authors, from John O. Westwood onwards, have unjustifiably "corrected" the spelling.

== Description ==
Upperside: Antennae black. Eyes brown. Thorax and abdomen black. Wings mazarine blue; the anterior ones having a white band crossing them from the middle of the anterior edges to the lower corners; the posterior edged with a white border, intersected by the blue tendons of the wings.

Underside: Palpi grey. Breast and abdomen black, streaked with white. Wings black where they are blue on the upper side, with the same white markings; but next the body are adorned with beautiful red streaks, ending in points resembling rays issuing from it. Margins of the wings entire. Wingspan 3 1/4 inches (82 mm).

== Subspecies ==
- H. s. sapho
- H. s. leuce Doubleday, 1847 (Mexico - Costa Rica, Guatemala)
- H. s. hewitsoni Hewitson, 1875 (Costa Rica, Panama)
- H. s. chocoensis Brown & Benson, 1975 (Colombia)
- H. s. candidus Brown, 1976 (Ecuador)
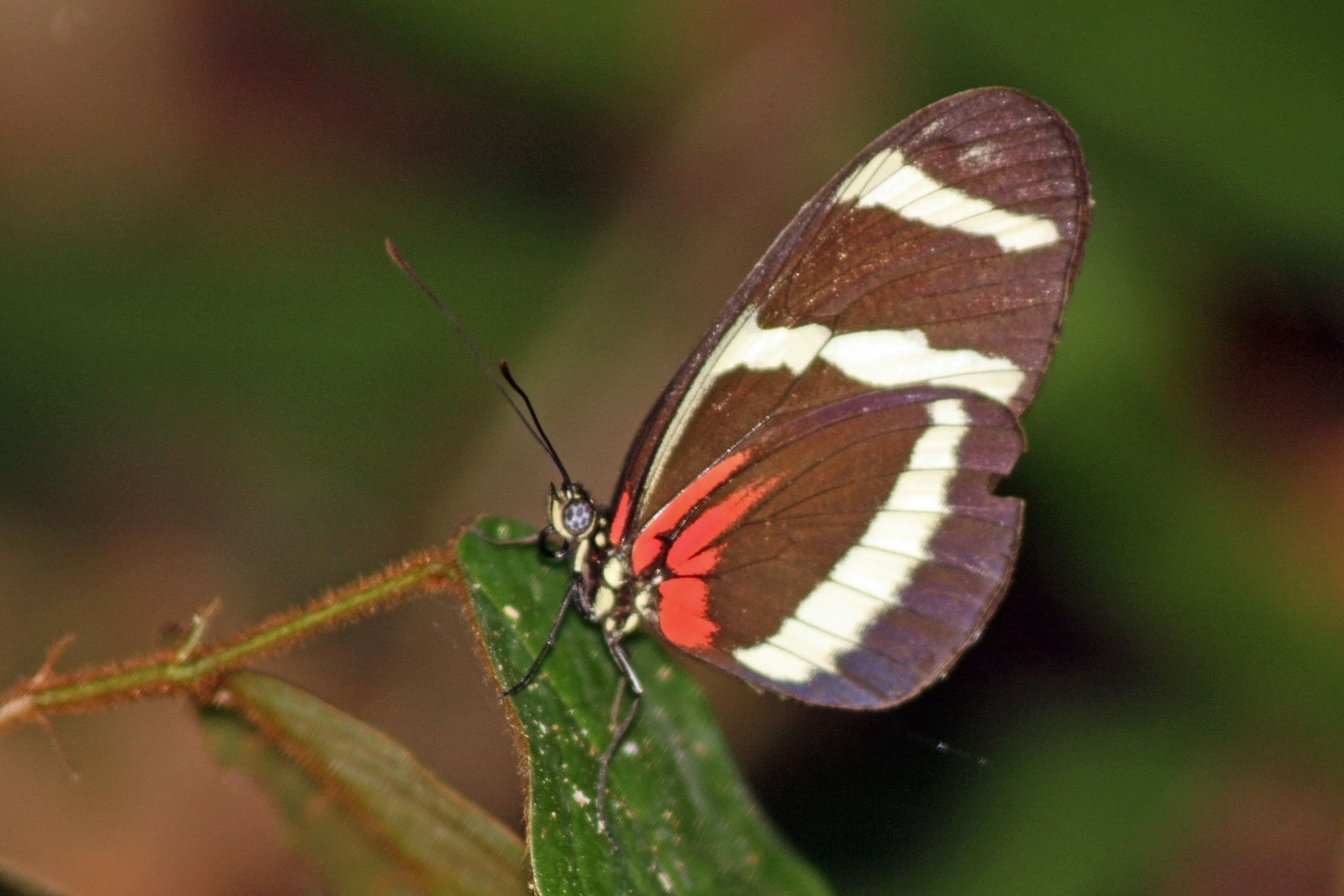
H. s. hewitsoni
Costa Rica

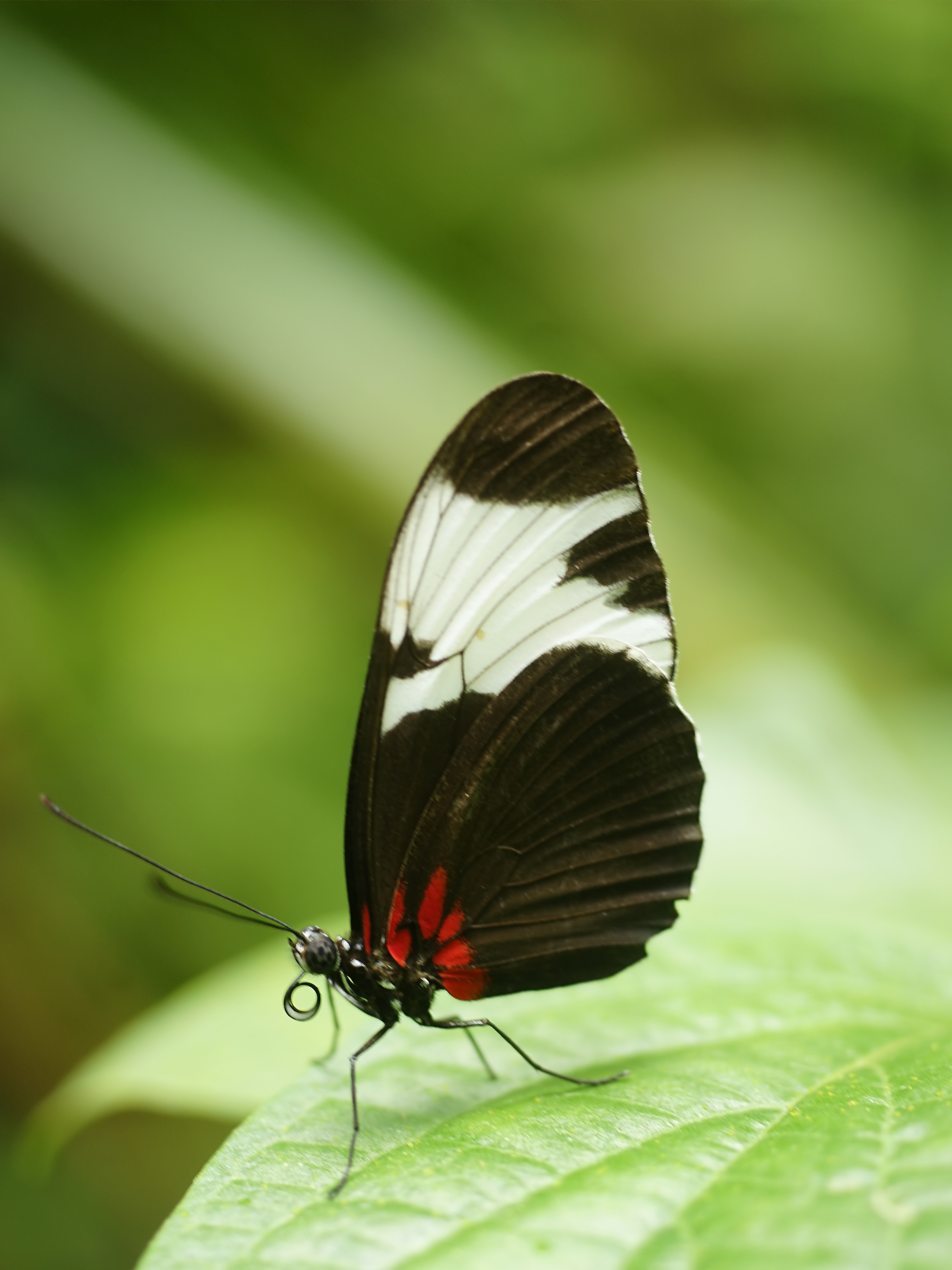
H. s. leuce
Costa Rica

== Protective coloration and behavior ==
=== Müllerian mimicry ===
H. sapho engages in Müllerian mimicry with fellow Lepidoptera member H. cydno. The coloring pattern of H. cydno is used to warn a predator of the unpleasant taste of their intended prey. H. sapho is mimicked by the subspecies H. cydno alithea when it exhibits one of its two colorations, known as its "white form".
