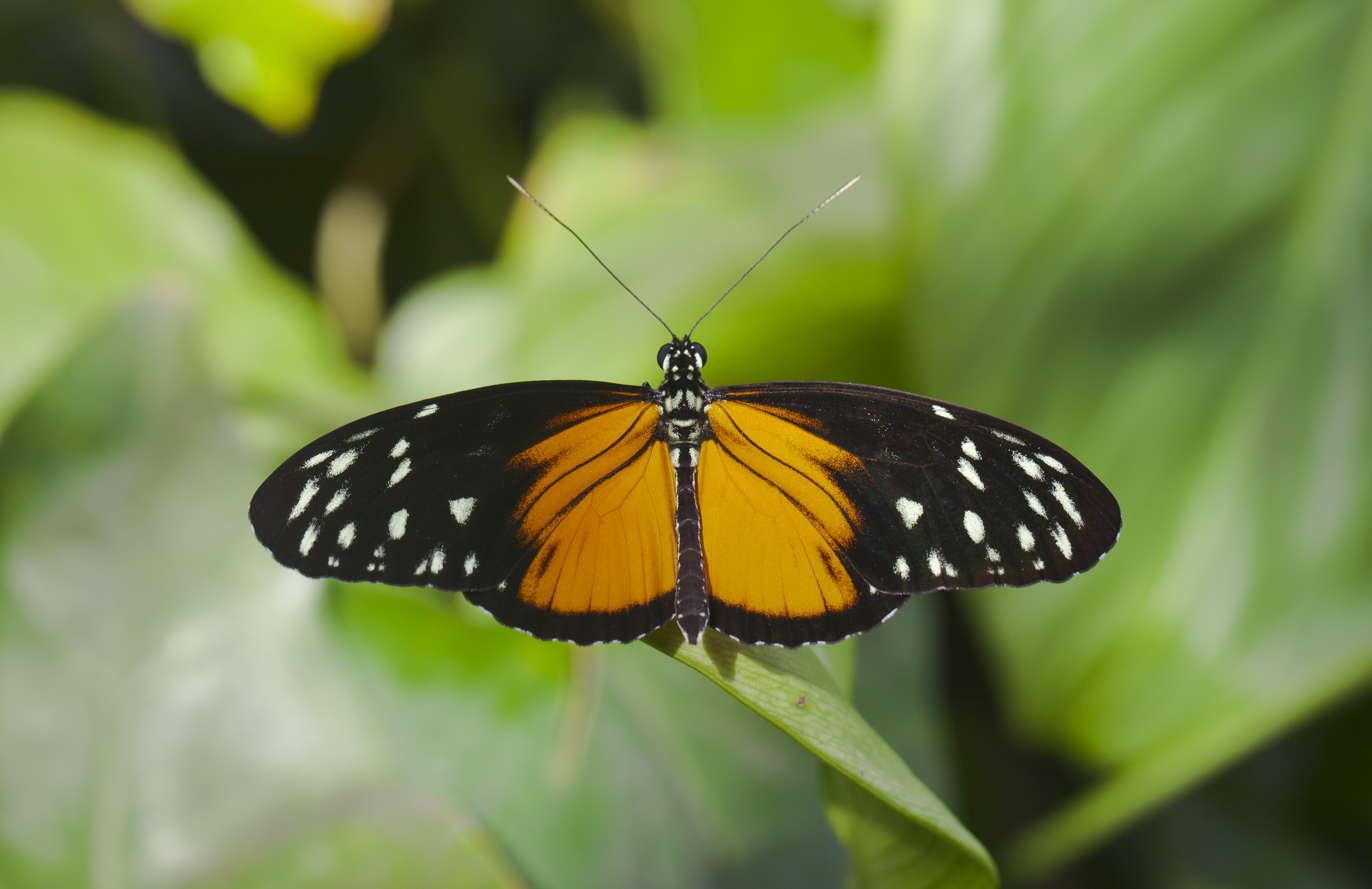
- Dorsal view
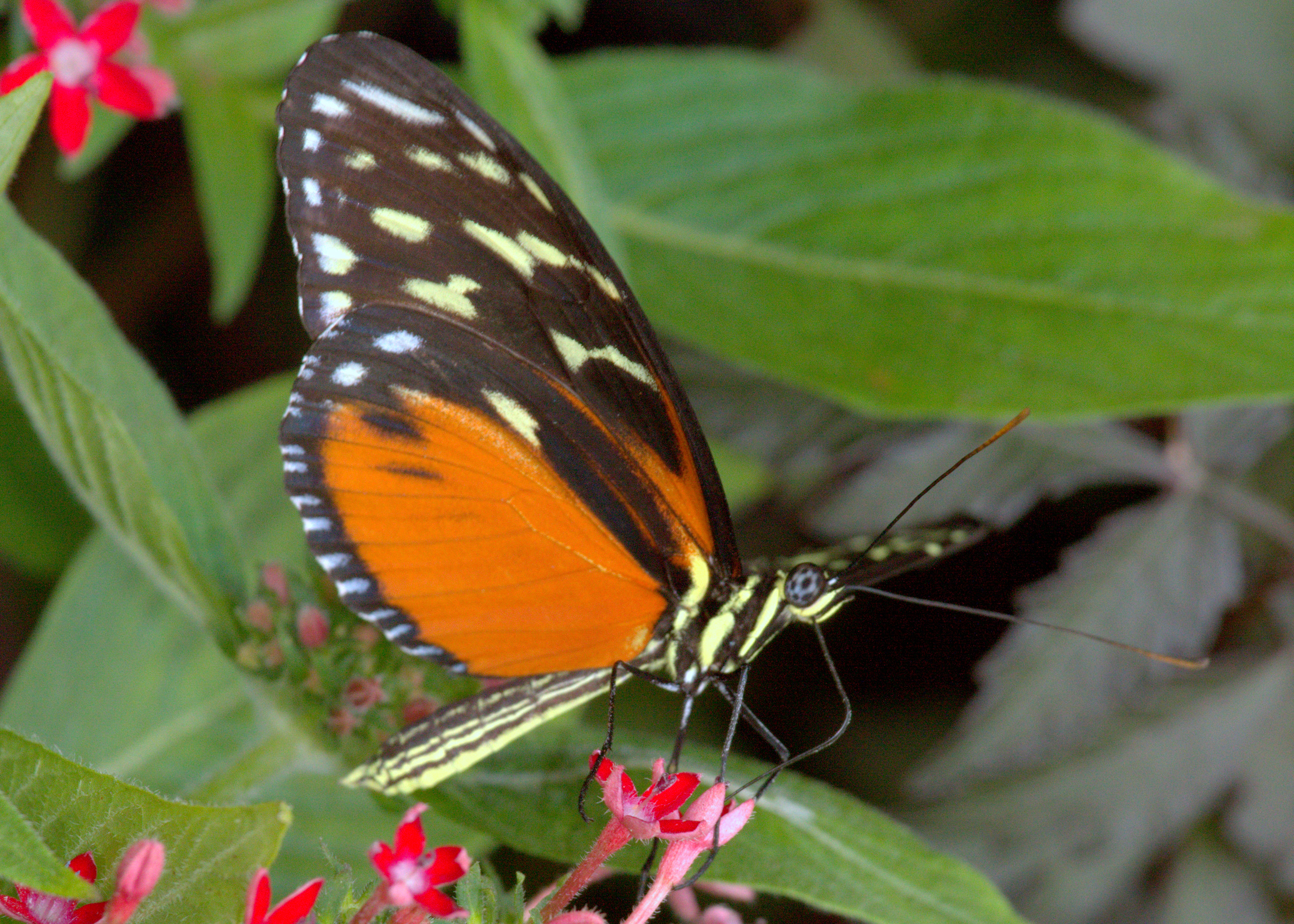
- Ventral view

Scientific classification
- Kingdom: Animalia
- Phylum: Arthropoda
- Clade: Pancrustacea
- Class: Insecta
- Order: Lepidoptera
- Family: Nymphalidae
- Genus: Heliconius
- Species: H. hecale

Binomial name
- Heliconius hecale (Fabricius, 1776)

Subspecies
- Many, see text

Synonyms
- Papilio hecale; Papilio urania Müller, 1774; Heliconius urania

= Heliconius hecale =

Species of butterfly

Heliconius hecale, the tiger longwing, Hecale longwing, golden longwing or golden heliconian, is a heliconiid butterfly that occurs from Mexico to the Peruvian Amazon.

== Subspecies ==
Listed alphabetically:

- H. h. anderida Hewitson, [1853]
- H. h. annetta Riffarth, 1900
- H. h. australis Brown, 1976
- H. h. barcanti Brown, 1976
- H. h. clearei Hall, 1930
- H. h. discomaculatus Weymer, 1891
- H. h. ennius Weymer, 1891
- H. h. felix Weymer, 1894
- H. h. fornarina Hewitson, [1854]
- H. h. hecale (Fabricius, 1775)
- H. h. holcophorus Staudinger, [1897]
- H. h. humboldti Neustetter, 1928
- H. h. ithaca C. & R. Felder, 1862
- H. h. latus Riffarth, 1900
- H. h. melicerta Bates, 1866
- H. h. metellus Weymer, 1894
- H. h. naxos Neukirchen, 1998
- H. h. nigrofasciatus Weymer, 1894
- H. h. novatus Bates, 1867
- H. h. paraensis Riffarth, 1900
- H. h. paulus Neukirchen, 1998
- H. h. quitalena Hewitson, [1853]
- H. h. rosalesi Brown & Fernández, 1976
- H. h. sisyphus Salvin, 1871
- H. h. shanki Lamas & Brown, 1976
- H. h. sulphureus Weymer, 1894
- H. h. vetustus Butler, 1873
- H. h. zeus Neukirchen, 1995
- H. h. zuleika Hewitson, 1854
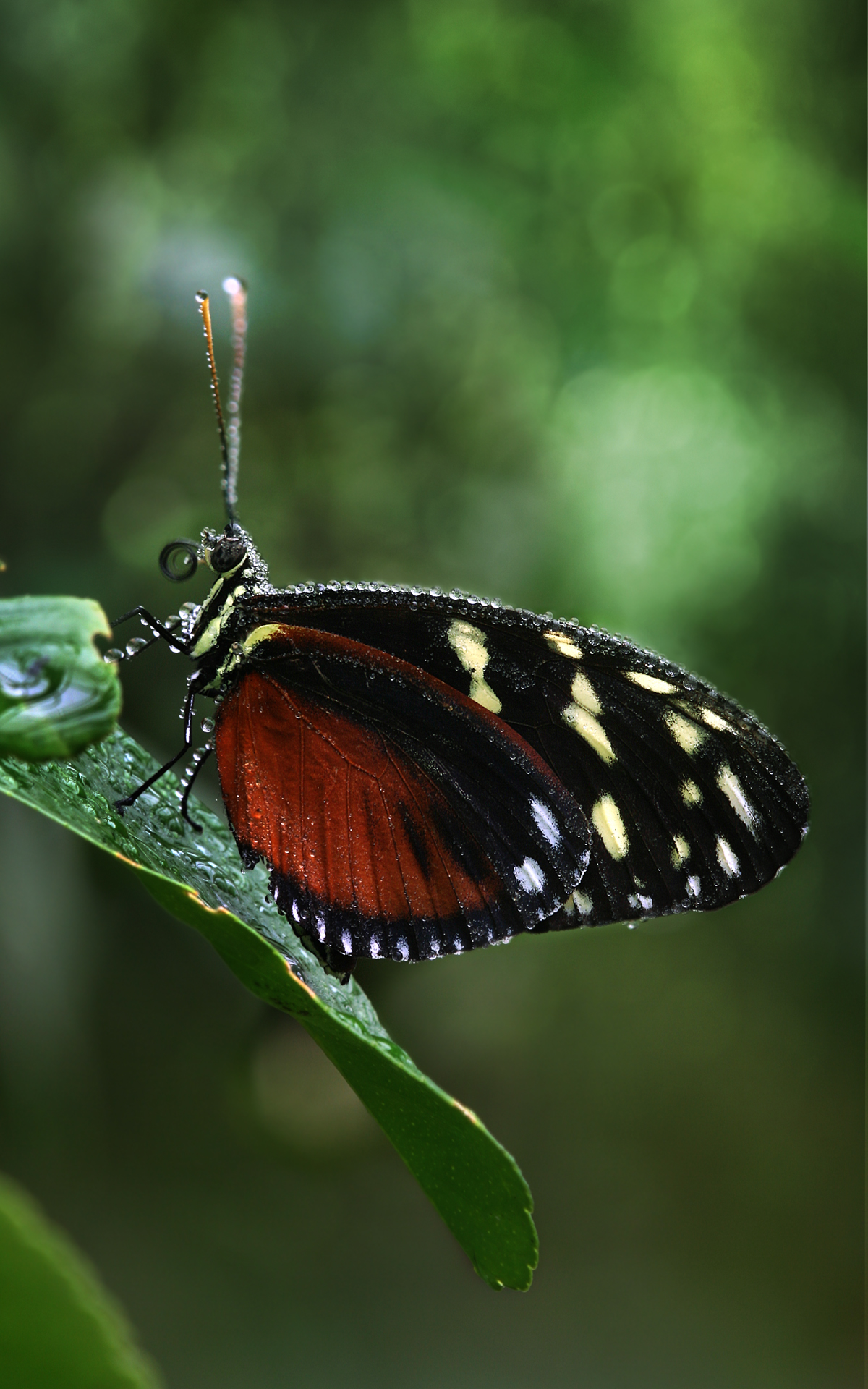
Ventral view - dew covered

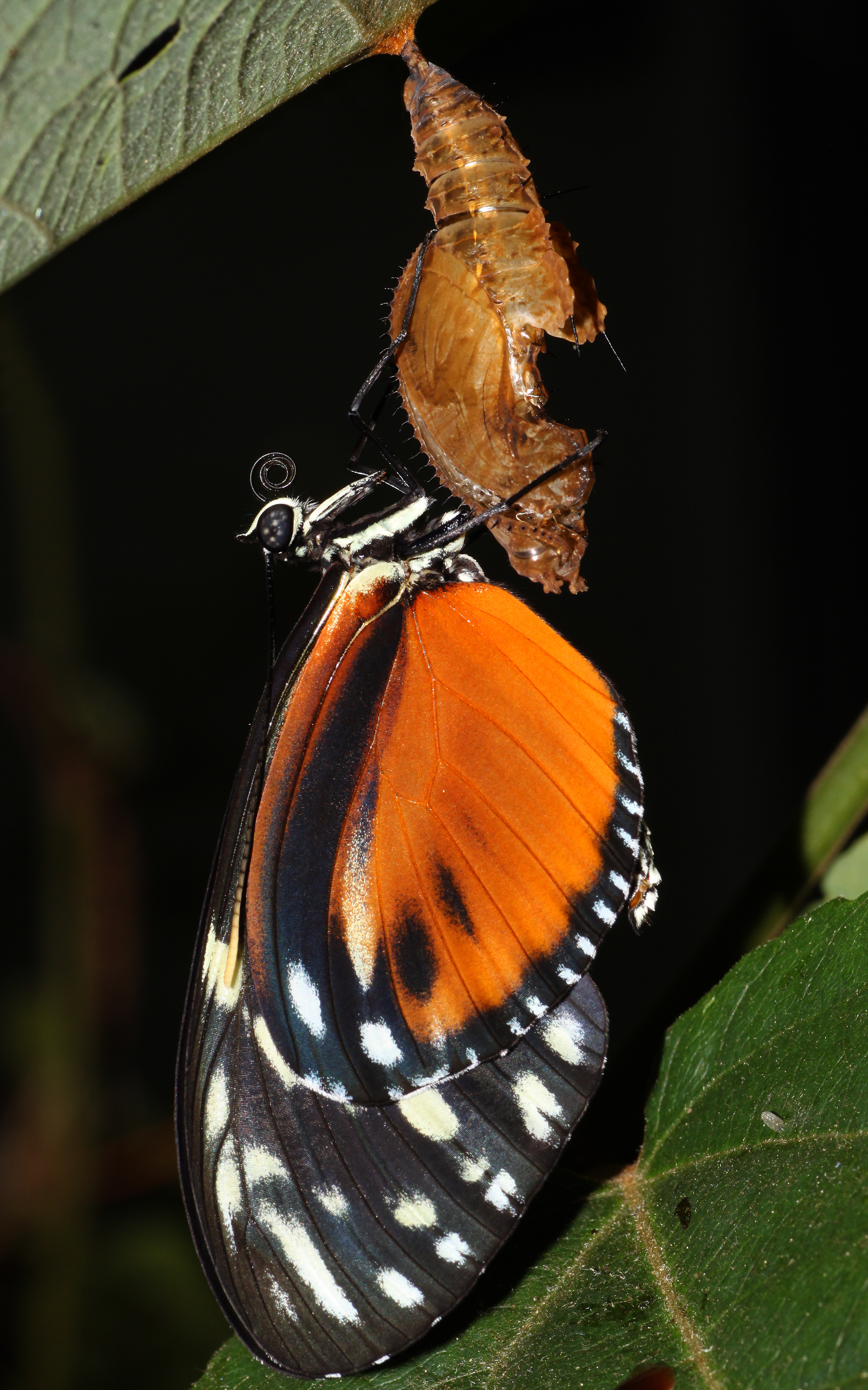
Just emerged
