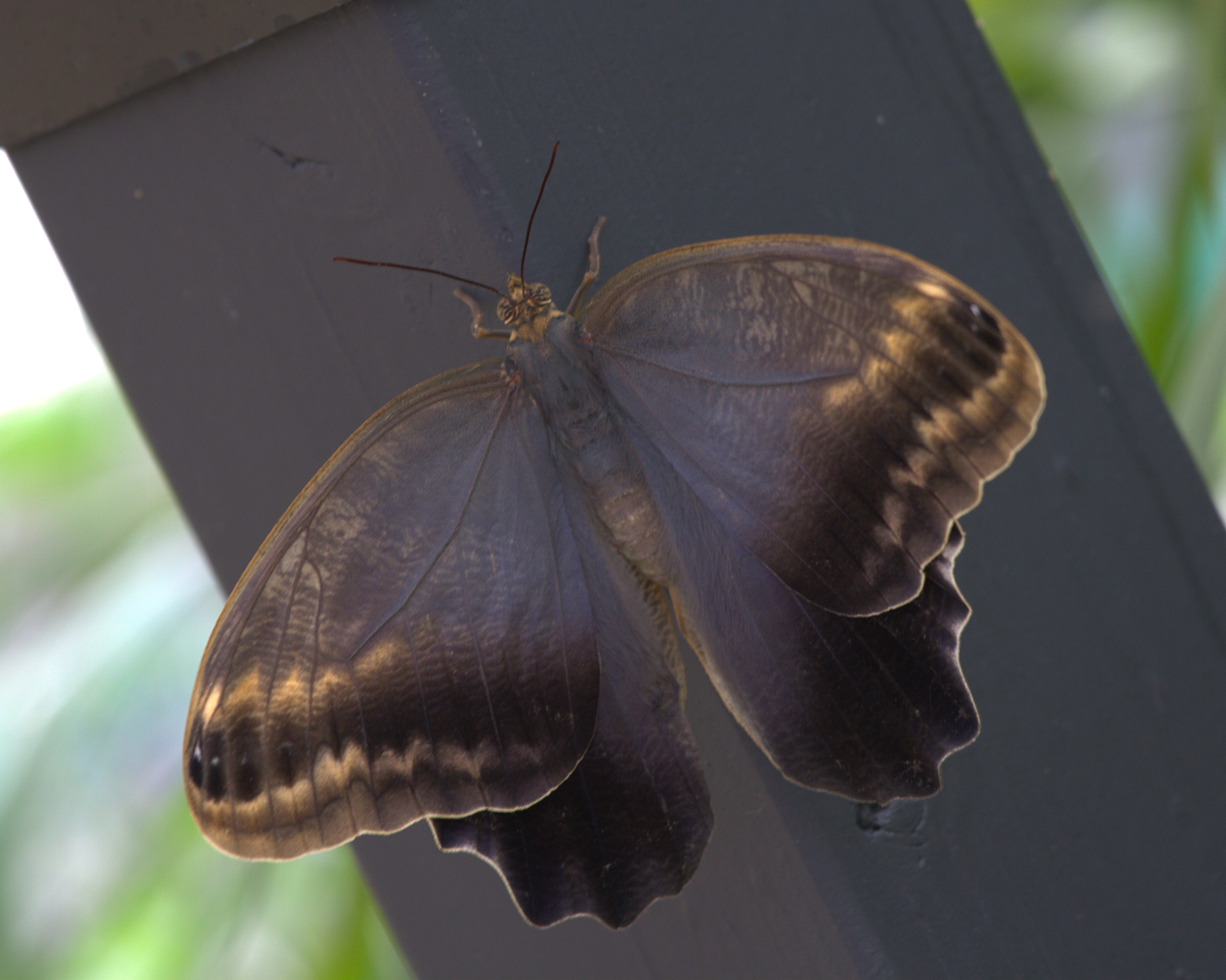
- Dorsal view
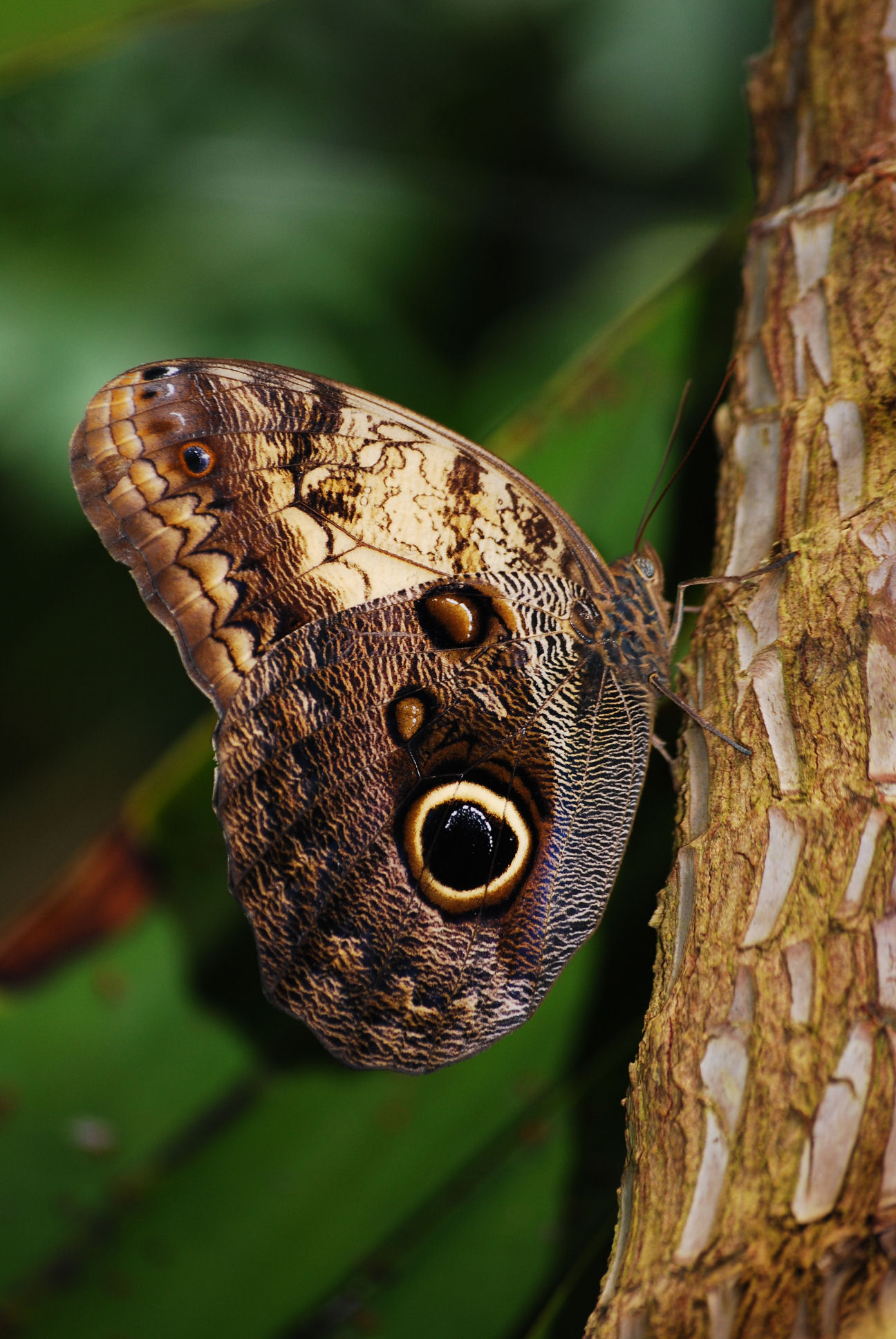
- Ventral view

Scientific classification
- Kingdom: Animalia
- Phylum: Arthropoda
- Class: Insecta
- Order: Lepidoptera
- Family: Nymphalidae
- Genus: Caligo
- Species: C. telamonius
- Subspecies: C. t. memnon

Trinomial name
- Caligo telamonius memnon (C. & R. Felder, [1867])

Synonyms
- Pavonia telamonius C. & R. Felder, 1862; Pavonia dardanus Boisduval, 1870

= Caligo telamonius memnon =

Giant owl

Species of butterfly in the family Nymphalidae

Caligo telamonius memnon, commonly known as the giant owl or pale owl, is a subspecies of butterfly of the family Nymphalidae. This subspecies can be found in rainforests and secondary forests from Mexico to the Amazon rainforest in South America.

The wingspan is usually from 115 to 130 mm, but can reach 150 mm.

The larvae feed on Musa, Canna and Heliconia species and can be a pest for banana cultivation. Adults feed on juices of rotting fruit.

== Gallery ==
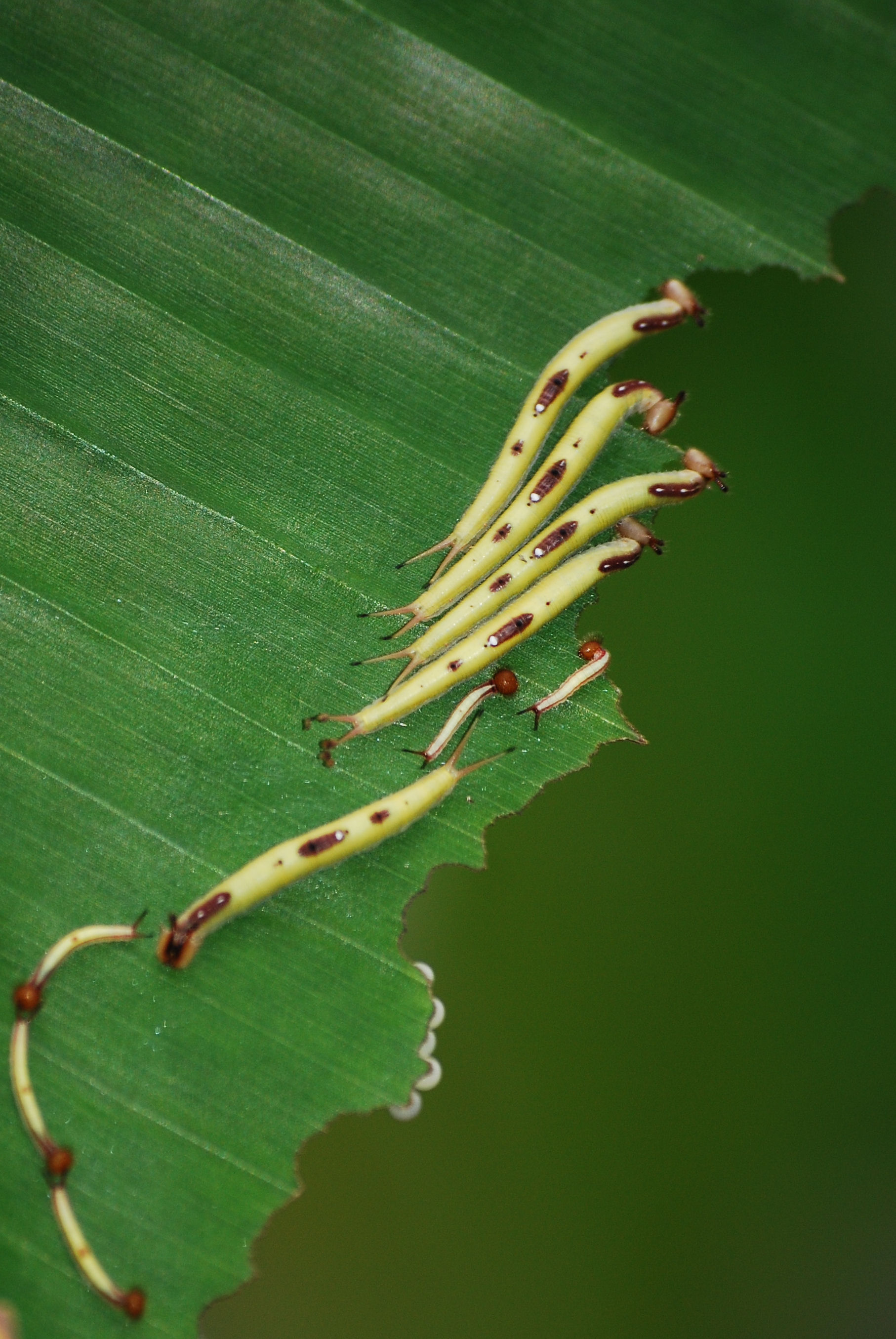
Larva

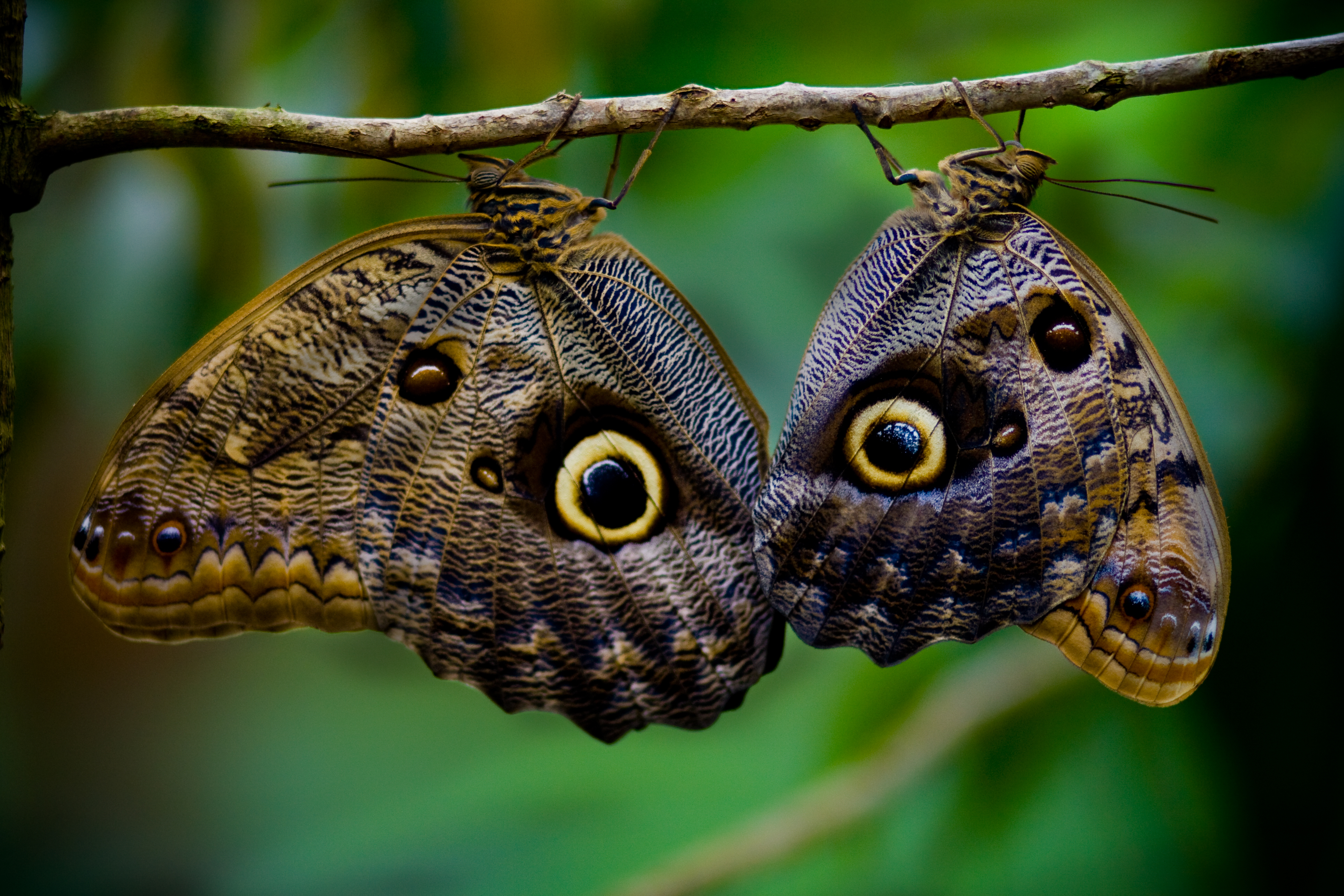
A pair at La Paz Waterfall Gardens, Costa Rica

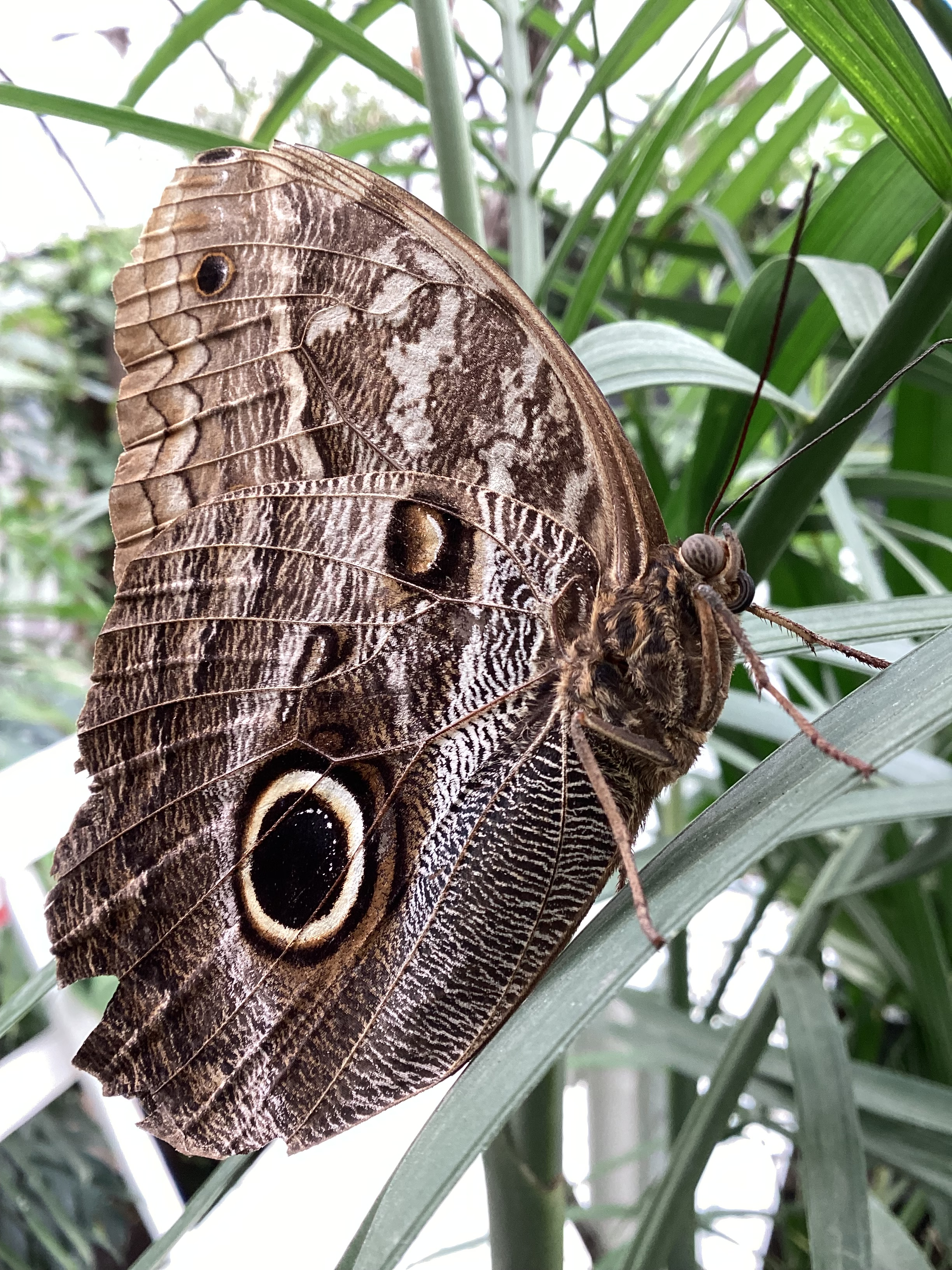
A close up of the species
