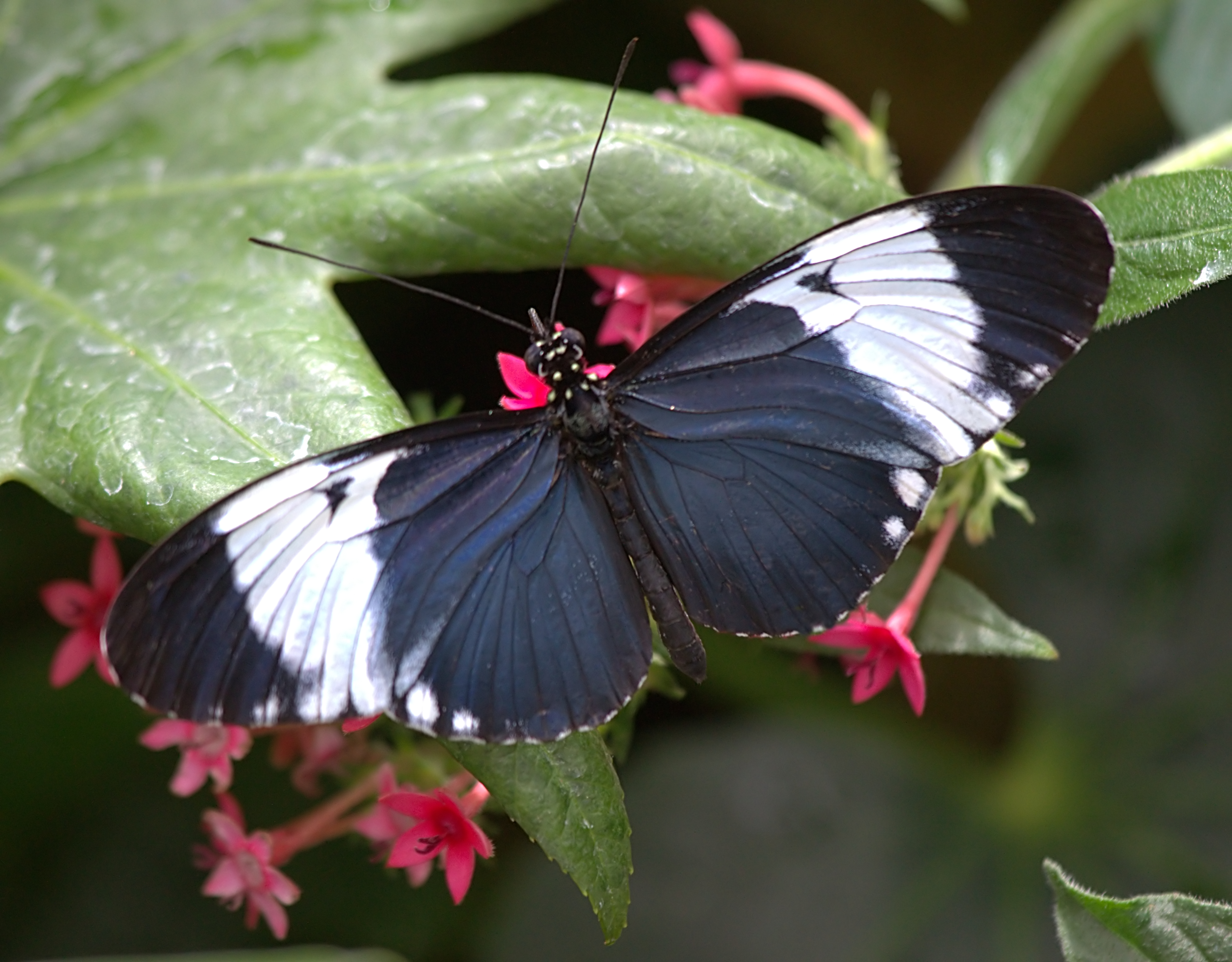
- At Krohn Conservatory, Cincinnati

Scientific classification
- Kingdom: Animalia
- Phylum: Arthropoda
- Class: Insecta
- Order: Lepidoptera
- Family: Nymphalidae
- Genus: Heliconius
- Species: H. cydno

Binomial name
- Heliconius cydno (Doubleday 1847)

Subspecies
- See text

= Heliconius cydno =

Cydno longwing

Species of butterfly

Heliconius cydno, the cydno longwing, is a nymphalid butterfly that ranges from Mexico to northern South America. It is typically found in the forest understory and deposits its eggs on a variety of plants of the genus Passiflora. It is a member of the Heliconiinae subfamily of Central and South America, and it is the only heliconiine that can be considered oligophagous. H. cydno is also characterized by hybridization and Müllerian mimicry. Wing coloration plays a key role in mate choice and has further implications in regards to sympatric speciation. Macrolide scent gland extracts and wing-clicking behavior further characterize this species.

== Subspecies ==
Listed alphabetically:

- H. c. alithea Hewitson, 1869
- H. c. barinasensis Masters, 1973
- H. c. chioneus Bates, 1864
- H. c. cordula Neustetter, 1913
- H. c. cydnides Staudinger, 1885
- H. c. cydno Doubleday, 1847
- H. c. hermogenes Hewitson, 1858
- H. c. gadouae Brown & Fernández, 1985
- H. c. galanthus Bates, 1864
- H. c. lisethae Neukirchen, 1995
- H. c. wanningeri Neukirchen, 1991
- H. c. weymeri Staudinger, [1897]
- H. c. zelinde Butler, 1869

[For H. c. pachinus Salvin, 1871 see as Heliconius pachinus Salvin, 1871 in several schemes]

== Distribution and habitat ==
H. cydno ranges from southern Mexico to western Ecuador in northern South America. H. cydno is considered to be non-migratory, or sedentary. H. cydno lives in closed-forest habitats, specifically in the forest understories. They live at elevations from sea level to 2000 meters. Their most common host plants are in the genus Passiflora, and at night, adults roost in twigs or tendrils from two to ten meters above the forest floor. Males generally tend to fly higher than females, who are found lower in the forest understory.

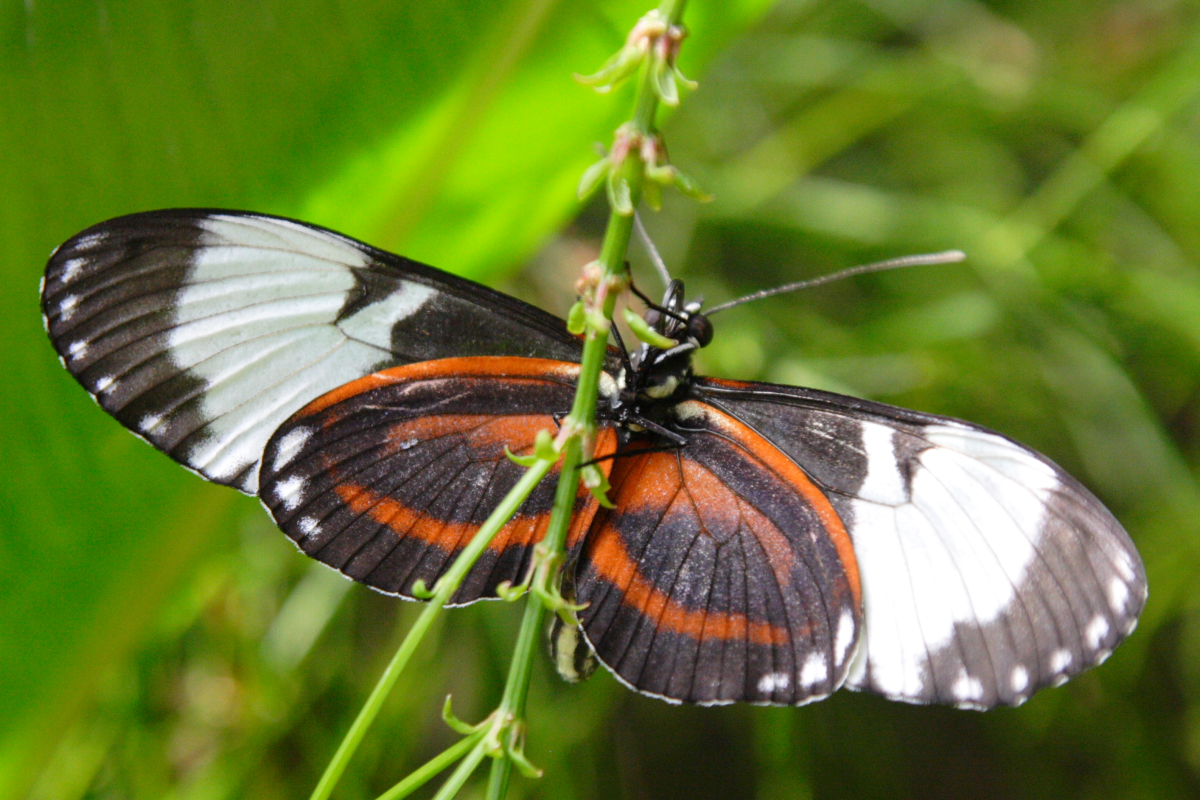
Underside of wing

== Host plant ==
The diet of H. cydno larva is generalist. Passiflora are less common in the closed-forest habitats of H. cydno, and thus the species uses a wide selection within the genus. They tend to prefer orange and red flowers.

Other species of Heliconius restrict their diet to a single species of Passiflora, while H. cydno is oligophagous (feeding on a restricted range of plants). There are records of five species of Passiflora being utilized by H. cydno, all in the subgenera Granadilla, Plectostemma, or Distephana. Both H. cydno and H. melpomene are known to utilize Psiguria warcsewiczii pollen.

== Parental care ==
=== Oviposition ===
Experiments performed pertaining to H. cydno oviposition reveal that they utilize chemoreception, not visual cues, when choosing their egg-laying sites. H. cydno's oviposition sites are generally the tendrils of their Passiflora host plants, and eggs are placed singly.

While leaf shape experiments and egg mimics do not have significant effects on oviposition, chemical cues from methanol render sites less appealing to H. cydno. Their lack of preference for leaf shape can be attributed to their varied usage of Passiflora hosts. H. cydno also does not participate in larval cannibalism, which plays a role in their indifference to egg mimics.

== Life cycle ==
=== Egg ===
The eggs of H. cydno are yellow, 1.1 mm in height and 0.9 mm wide.

=== Larvae ===
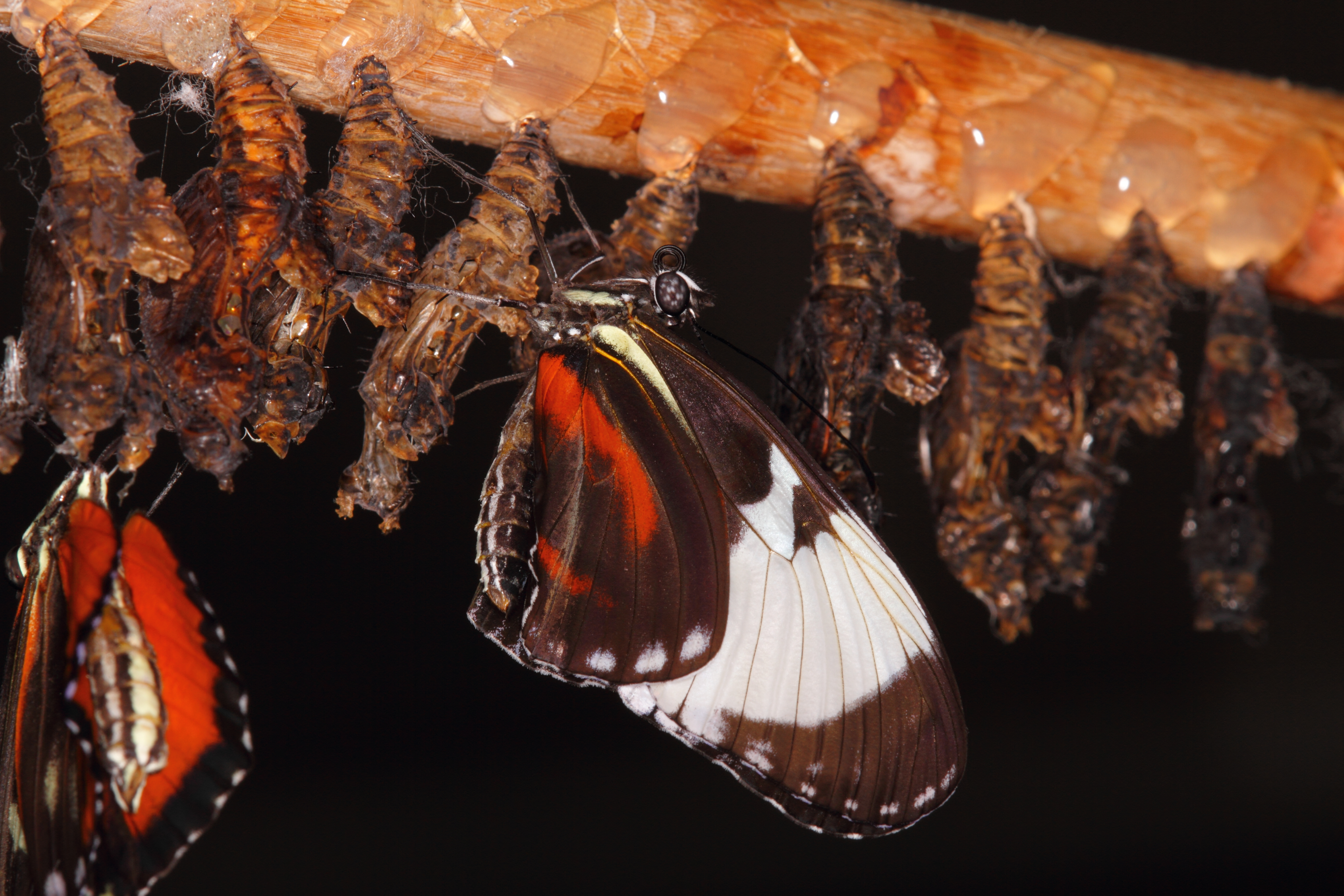
In the Schönbrunn Zoo aquarium house

Early instar larvae of this species have a white body and black spines.

Mature larvae are characterized by an orange head topped by two black horns 1.2 cm long. Their bodies are brownish pink, with black scoli (spines with multiple points) and black spots. The caterpillars of H. cydno are known to form small groups, demonstrating social behavior.

=== Pupae ===
Pupae of H. cydno are characterized by antennae, an abdomen with long spines, and a general dark brown color. They have two rectangular gold patches that decorate the thorax.

=== Adult ===
Adults have forewings and hindwings which are black with either yellow or white bands/spots. Their hindwings have bars on their ventral surface, distinguishing themselves from mimics. Wing coloration is dependent on location.

== Protective coloration and behavior ==
=== Müllerian mimicry ===
H. cydno engages in the predator defense mechanism of Müllerian mimicry with H. eleuchia (specifically in Ecuador) and H. sapho by adopting colors that warn a predator of their bad taste, deterring attacks. For instance, H. cydno alithea, which has two potential colorings, mimics H. eleuchia in its yellow form, and mimics H. sapho in its white form. In contrast, H. cydno's close relative, H. melpomene, mimics H. erato.

== Genetics ==
=== Hybridization ===
It is a species well known and widely researched for its tendency to hybridize with the closely related H. melpomene, from which it diverged around 1.5 million years ago. They are sympatric for much of the geographic range of H. cydno, from Central America to northern South America, and exhibit a low level of hybridization and gene flow in nature. Hybrids between the two species occur at a frequency of less than 0.1%. Their low levels of hybridization can, in part, be attributed to pre-mating isolation, as H. melpone is found in more open habitats, while H. cydno lives in a closed-forest environment. Studies suggest that changes in host use and mimicry in H. melpomene and H. cydno are genetically determined and may contribute to pre-mating isolation. In the past, this likely contributed to speciation. H. pachinus is also known to hybridize with H. melpomene. The fact that both species hybridize with H. melpomene is considered significant because H. melpomene exhibits a distinct pheromonal chemistry and coloring.

In fact, it has been suggested that wing preference patterns in mating may limit hybridization, a preference which is also known to limit hybridization between H. cydno and H. pachinus, which is another closely related species. Thus, divergent coloring (and therefore, mimicry), contributes to sympatric speciation.

While hybridization of species is present, there is evidence to suggest that hybrids are less successful in mating than their non-hybrid counterparts. Hybrids will mate with one another; however, their mating success is 50% of that of their parents, demonstrating disruptive sexual selection against these hybrids that helps to maintain the two species as separate, sympatric species.

=== Color patterns ===
There are four key loci that affect wing color and pattern in H. cydno. L determines whether a given individual has melanic scales over their forewing band. The Sb and Yb loci are tightly linked in H. cydno, although the exact distance is not known. The Sb locus controls for the white submarginal band on the hindwing. The allele for the band is recessive. The Yb locus controls for a yellow band on the hindwing. The allele for this yellow band is also recessive. The K locus determines whether the medial band on the forewing, dorsally and ventrally, is yellow or white. An additional locus, G, determines the red line located on the forewing, at the base of the costal vein.

== Mating ==
=== Coloration ===
It has been determined, based on crosses performed between H. cydno and H. melpomene, as well as between H. cydno and H. pachinus, that there are specific linkage groups associated with both male preference and female mating outcome (red verses black in cydno/melpomene crosses and white verses yellow in cydno/pachinus crosses). Strong linkage can be seen between mate preference and dominant wing color at the locus that controls forewing coloration. This contributes to co-evolution of mimicry and mate preference while maintaining the association of different species.

=== Iridescence and light polarization ===
Wing iridescence is another factor in H. cydno mating. Heliconius butterflies in general use thin-film iridescence and polarized light for mate recognition. H. cydno has blue iridescence which, at some angles, is 90% polarized. In experiments investigating polarized light as a signal in mating, it was found that when a female's wings were shown behind a depolarizing filter, she was approached at a significantly lower rate than when her wings were shown behind a non-depolarizing filter. It has been suggested that the high degree of iridescence displayed by H. cydno can be attributed to their forest understory habitat, which generally has less-direct sunlight.

=== Multiple matings ===
H. cydno females are known to mate multiply, thus engaging in polyandry. There are many possible benefits to females mating multiply that may conclude more robust progeny, more allocation of resources, or other benefits.

== Physiology ==
=== Macrolide scent gland extracts ===
Research done on H. cydno in Costa Rica suggests that the species has 12- and 14-membered macrolide scent gland extracts which have a C-18 skeleton. They are derived from linolenic, linoleic, and oleic acids and have an S configuration. According to the study, other species' desire and ability to hybridize with H. cydno was not affected by their possession of macrolide scent gland extracts.

== Social behavior ==
In an experiment by Mirian Medina Hay-Roe and Richard W. Mankin, field-collected H. cydno females were found to produce wing clicks when interacting with members of the same species. Wing clicks are made in short sequences of three to ten clicks, at a speed of approximately ten clicks per second. They demonstrated this behavior during the day and at roosting time, when individuals came close to one another so as to almost touch one another's head or wings. This behavior was also observed during aggressive interactions with H. erato females. When an experimental group of H. cydno were moved to a greenhouse and allowed to reproduce, the first generation of adults born in the greenhouses did not demonstrate wing-clicking behavior. The frequency of wing clicking peaked at 1075 Hz, which is close to the 1200-Hz frequency peak of auditory sensitivity in H. erato. This further suggests that communication both between and within species may be facilitated through this behavior.
